= Comarca de Alcalá =

Alcalá
- historical comarca
- Coat of arms
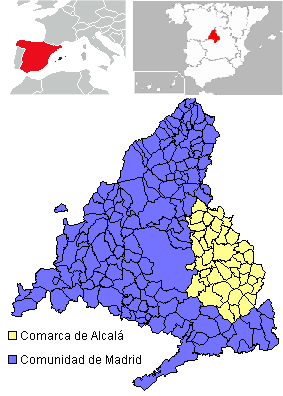
- Country: Spain
- Autonomous community: Community of Madrid
- Province: Madrid
- Capital: Alcalá de Henares
- Municipalities: List: Ajalvir, Alalpardo, Alcalá de Henares, Algete, Ambite, Anchuelo, Arganda del Rey, Belvis de Jarama, Camarma de Esteruelas, Campo Real, Carabaña, Cobeña, Corpa, Coslada, Daganzo de Arriba, Fresno de Torote, Fuente el Saz de Jarama, Loeches, Los Hueros, Los Santos de la Humosa, Meco, Mejorada del Campo, Nuevo Baztán, Olmeda de las Fuentes, Orusco de Tajuña, Paracuellos de Jarama, Perales de Tajuña, Pezuela de las Torres, Pozuelo del Rey, Ribatejada, Rivas-Vaciamadrid, San Fernando de Henares, Santorcaz, Serracines, Tielmes, Torrejón de Ardoz, Torres de la Alameda, Valdeavero, Valdeolmos, Valdetorres de Jarama, Valdilecha, Valverde de Alcalá, Velilla de San Antonio, Villalbilla, Villar del Olmo

Area
  - Total: 1,421.42 km^{2} (548.81 sq mi)

Population
  - Total: 683,942
  - Density: 481.168/km^{2} (1,246.22/sq mi)
- Time zone: UTC+1 (CET)
  - Summer (DST): UTC+2 (CEST)
- Largest municipality: Alcalá de Henares

Comarca de Alcalá is an historical comarca of Castile, located in what is now the east of the Community of Madrid, in Spain.

Its head or capital city is Alcalá de Henares. Officially the Community of Madrid is not subdivided into formal comarcas; however, informally some governmental institutions have defined some shires according to different views. The shire of Alcalá doesn't figure in any of these partitions. The territory is made up by two natural sub-shires, La Campiña and Alcarria de Alcalá.

== Etymology ==
Its name comes from the Arabic القلعة (Al-Qal'at) whose means "the castle", referring to the first of the Muslim castles placed along the banks of the Henares River.
