= Las Vegas (comarca) =

The Comarca de Las Vegas is an informal comarca, defined by the Guía de Turismo Rural y Activo, edited by Directorate General of Tourism (Consejería de Cultura y Turismo) of the Community of Madrid, it covers some 1,378.13 km^{2} (532.10 sq mi) and is bound geographically by three rivers Tajo, Tajuña and Jarama. The capital is Aranjuez.

== Municipalities in El Comarca de Las Vegas ==
The comarca comprises several villages and settlements whose surface area and population in the year 2006 was:.

The regional authority of the Community of Madrid Spain on the Iberian peninsula

The location of the Comarca de Las Vegas within its Spanish region

Municipality	Surface area	Population
Total comarca	1,378.13	135,171
Ambite	26	394
Aranjuez	189.13	52,224
Belmonte de Tajo	23.71	1,266
Brea de Tajo	44.33	516
Carabaña	47.58	1,526
Chinchón	115.91	4,943
Ciempozuelos	49.64	18,764
Colmenar de Oreja	114.32	7,247
Estremera	79.1	1,297
Fuentidueña	60.59	1,799
Morata de Tajuña	45.2	6,548
Orusco de Tajuña	21.51	1,017
Perales de Tajuña	48.92	2,469
San Martín de la Vega	105.93	15,677
Tielmes	26.88	2,468
Titulcia	9.95	914
Valdaracete	64.31	604
Valdelaguna	42.13	741
Valdilecha	42.48	2,326
Villaconejos	32.97	3,070
Villamanrique de Tajo	29.32	701
Villar del Olmo	27.62	1,947
Villarejo de Salvanés	118.62	6,713

== See also ==
- Community of Madrid
- List of municipalities in Madrid
