= Eugenio Oliva =

Spanish painter (1852–1925)

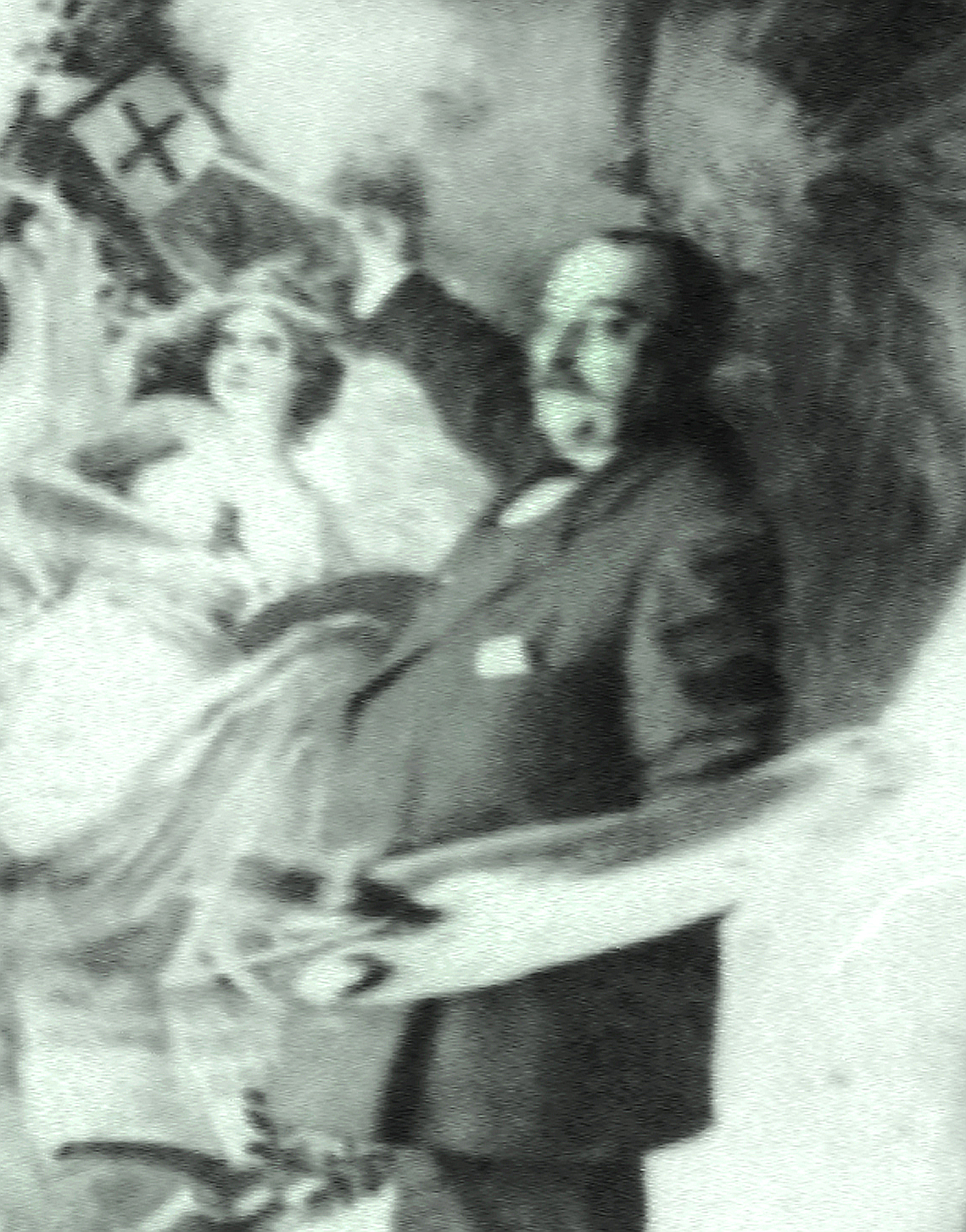
- Oliva at the Palencia Deputation, 1912
- Born: Eugenio Oliva y Rodrigo; 12 February 1852; Palencia, Spain
- Died: March 1925 (aged 73); Villaconejos, Spain
- Education: Escuela Municipal de Dibujo de Palencia; Escuela Superior de Pintura, Escultura y Grabado, Madrid
- Known for: Painter
- Movement: Orientalist

Eugenio Oliva y Rodrigo (12 February 1852 – March 1925) was a Spanish painter, primarily known for his murals.

== Biography ==
Oliva was born in Palencia. His father was a farmer from Murcia with artistic aspirations. He and his brother José were enrolled in the "Escuela Municipal de Dibujo de Palencia". Around 1873, he went to Madrid to continue his studies at the "Escuela Superior de Pintura, Escultura y Grabado", a school associated with the Real Academia de Bellas Artes de San Fernando. He also found a position in the workshops of Germán Hernández Amores, a painter from Murcia who may have known his father.

He did well in his studies, but showings at the National Exhibitions in 1876 and 1878 were disappointing. However, later in 1878, a place opened up at the "Academia Española de Bellas Artes de Roma" and a competition was held to fill it. He won the competition and was awarded a stipend to go to Rome. Shortly after, he married the daughter of an actor named Francisco Bueno and they went together in 1879.

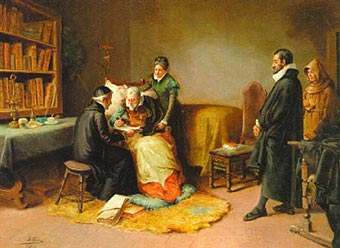
The Last Moments of Cervantes; inscribing a copy of Don Quixote for the Count of Lemos.

While there, he sent numerous works back to Spain (as required); mostly on Biblical and Classical themes. He also visited Venice and Naples, doing paintings on lighter subjects. After four years, he received his qualifications and was awarded second place at the National Exhibition of 1884 for his painting of Miguel de Cervantes.

Upon returning to Madrid, he attempted to build a clientele, but things did not go well until late in 1885 when Casto Plasencia, representing the Basílica of San Francisco el Grande, commissioned him to decorate the Chapel of Carlos III on the theme of the Immaculate Conception. In 1889, this work earned him the Order of Isabel the Catholic. It also led to a commission to decorate the meeting room of the Caja Madrid with allegories on the Cardinal Virtues.

Despite these successes, family obligations required him to seek employment as a teacher so, in 1890, he obtained an interim position as a professor of drawing and decorative arts at the Escuela de Artes y Oficios. Over the next decade, he would hold several other interim or low-paying posts until, in 1903, he achieved a tenured professorship at the Escuela de Artes e Industrias, followed by a similar position at the Escuela de Artes y Oficios in 1911.

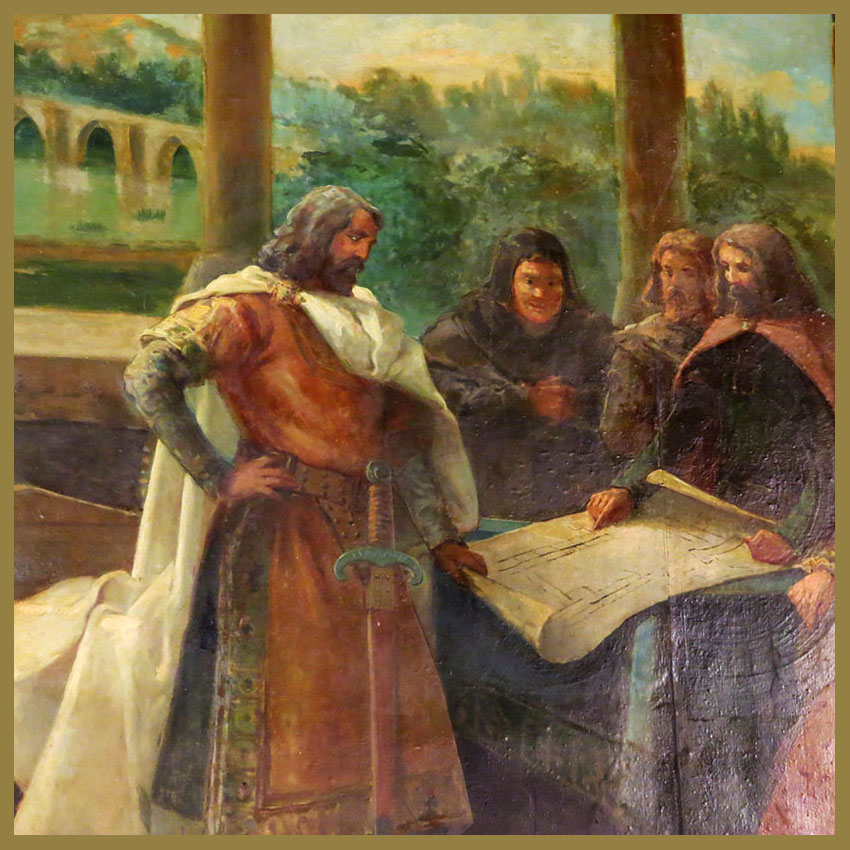
Detail from a mural in the dance hall at the Círculo de Recreo, showing Count Pedro Ansúrez

During this time, he received another commission for murals at the Círculo de Recreo de la Victoria (a private club) in Valladolid. A few of these in the casino were apparently somewhat suggestive in nature and included a version of Leda and the swan with friars. This was in addition to more traditional Classical scenes executed at private residences. In 1907, the Diputación of his home town engaged him to create religious murals at the orphan's home and provincial hospice. In 1911, as a result of that work, he was commissioned to paint historical murals in the lobby of the Diputacion's governmental palace. All but one of these were severely damaged by a fire in 1966.

In 1919 his son Ángel, who was a doctor, invited his parents to live with him in Villaconejos. Oliva accepted and spent his last years painting small format genre canvases; mostly dealing with peasant life and the local wineries. His wife died in 1924 and he died in Villaconejos the year after, aged 73.
