= Colmenar de Oreja =

- Municipality
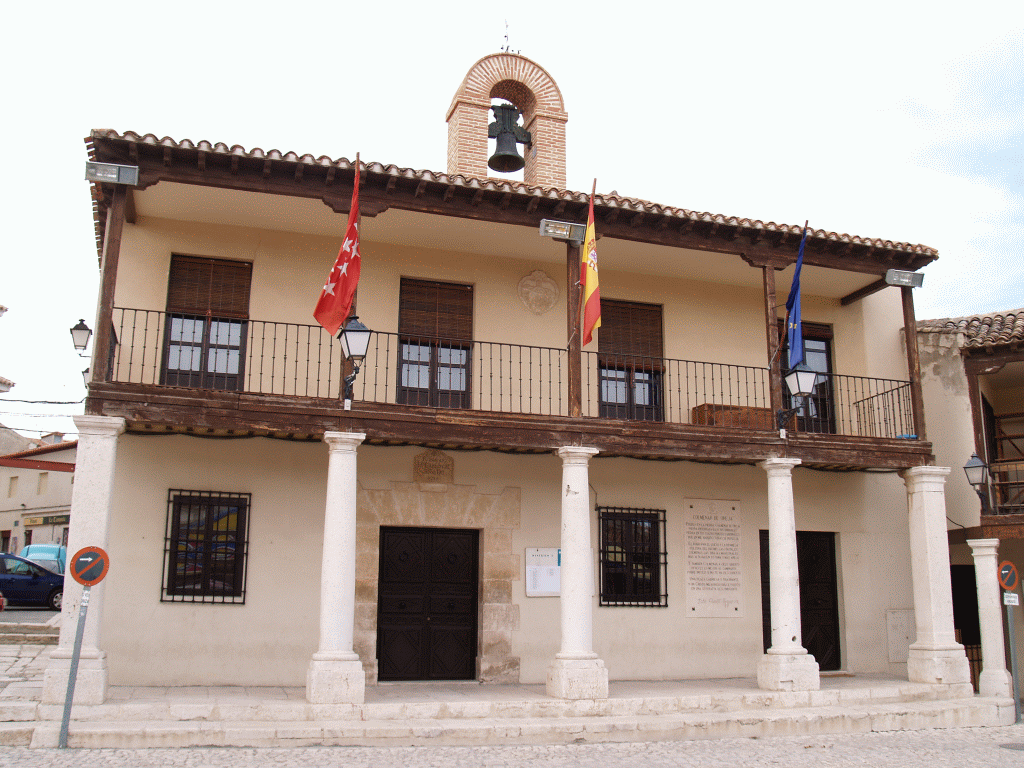
- City Hall.

- Coat of arms

- Location of Colmenar de Oreja in Madrid

- Location in Spain
- Coordinates: 40°6′33″N 3°23′13″W
- Country: Spain
- Autonomous community: Madrid
- Comarca: Las Vegas
- Municipality: Colmenar de Oreja

Government
  - Mayor: David Moya Aguilar

Area
  - Total: 126.3 km^{2} (48.8 sq mi)
- Elevation: 761 m (2,497 ft)

Population (2025-01-01)
  - Total: 9,127
  - Density: 72.26/km^{2} (187.2/sq mi)
- Demonym: Colmenaretes
- Time zone: UTC+1 (CET)
  - Summer (DST): UTC+2 (CEST)
- Postal code: 28380
- Website: Official website

Colmenar de Oreja is a town and municipality of the Las Vegas comarca, in the Community of Madrid, Spain. It was subject to a seven-month siege in 1139.

== Location ==
It is located in the hydrographic plateau of the rivers Tagus and Tajuña, at 40º 07' 00" north and 5º 47' 30" east, in the region of La Alcarria de Chinchón. Its altitude at Mediterranean level is 753 meters on the north door of Santa Maria la Mayor church. The highest point in the district is in Navarredonda at 780 metres, and the lowest is in the river at its entrance in the district, whose altitude is 515 metres. Its municipal district is bounded to the north by Valdelaguna, Chinchón and Villaconejos, to the south by the province of Toledo and the municipalities of Villarrubia de Santiago, Noblejas, Ocaña and Aranjuez; to the east by the municipalities of Belmonte de Tajo, Villarejo de Salvanés and Villarrubia de Santiago, and to the west by Aranjuez.

== Transport ==
Located 50 km from Madrid capital city, Colmenar de Oreja is presently only accessible by road, since its former railway station and connection does not exist anymore. There are regular bus routes from Madrid (Line 337) and from Aranjuez (Line 430).

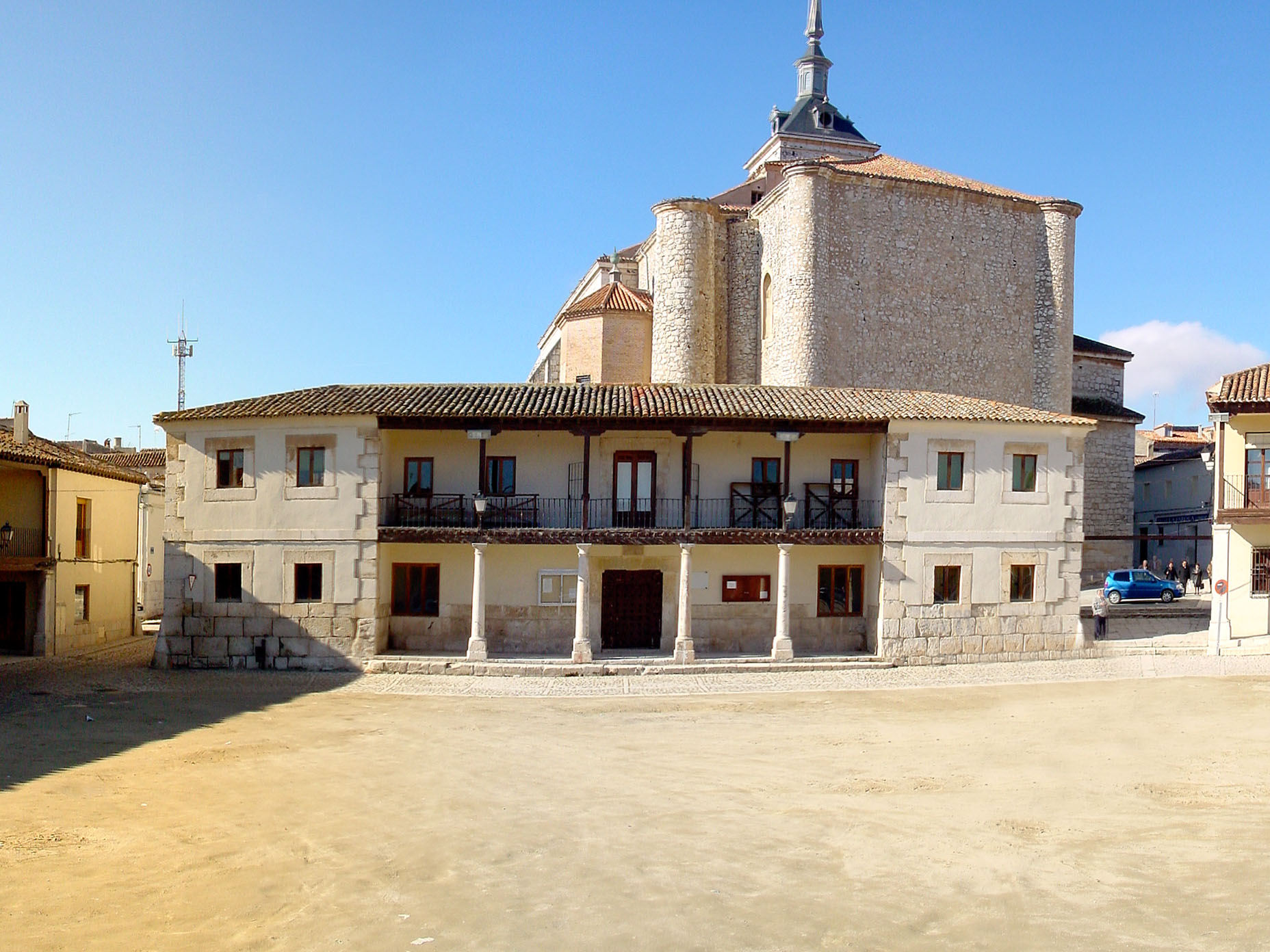
Colmenar de Oreja Main Square; behind, Santa María la Mayor parish Church

== Name ==
The name Colmenar de Oreja, comes from the Latin name “Apis Aureliae”. The Aureliae Fort (later Castle of Oreja) might have been named after the Roman consul Aurelio. Around the fort several villages emerged, one of them, dedicated to apiculture, was Apis Aureliae (latin name for Apiary of Aurelio), later in Spanish, Colmenar de Oreja.

== History ==
First known human settlements in Colmenar de Oreja are traced back to the Second Iron Age and located in the caves on the Tagus river basin and within the archaeological site of Los Castrejones, both sites occupied by the Carpetani. The region of La Vega is cited by historians Polybius and Livy in their description of the Tagus Battle in 220 BC, when 100000 Carpetani, Olcades and Vaccaei were defeated by Carthaginian general Hannibal.

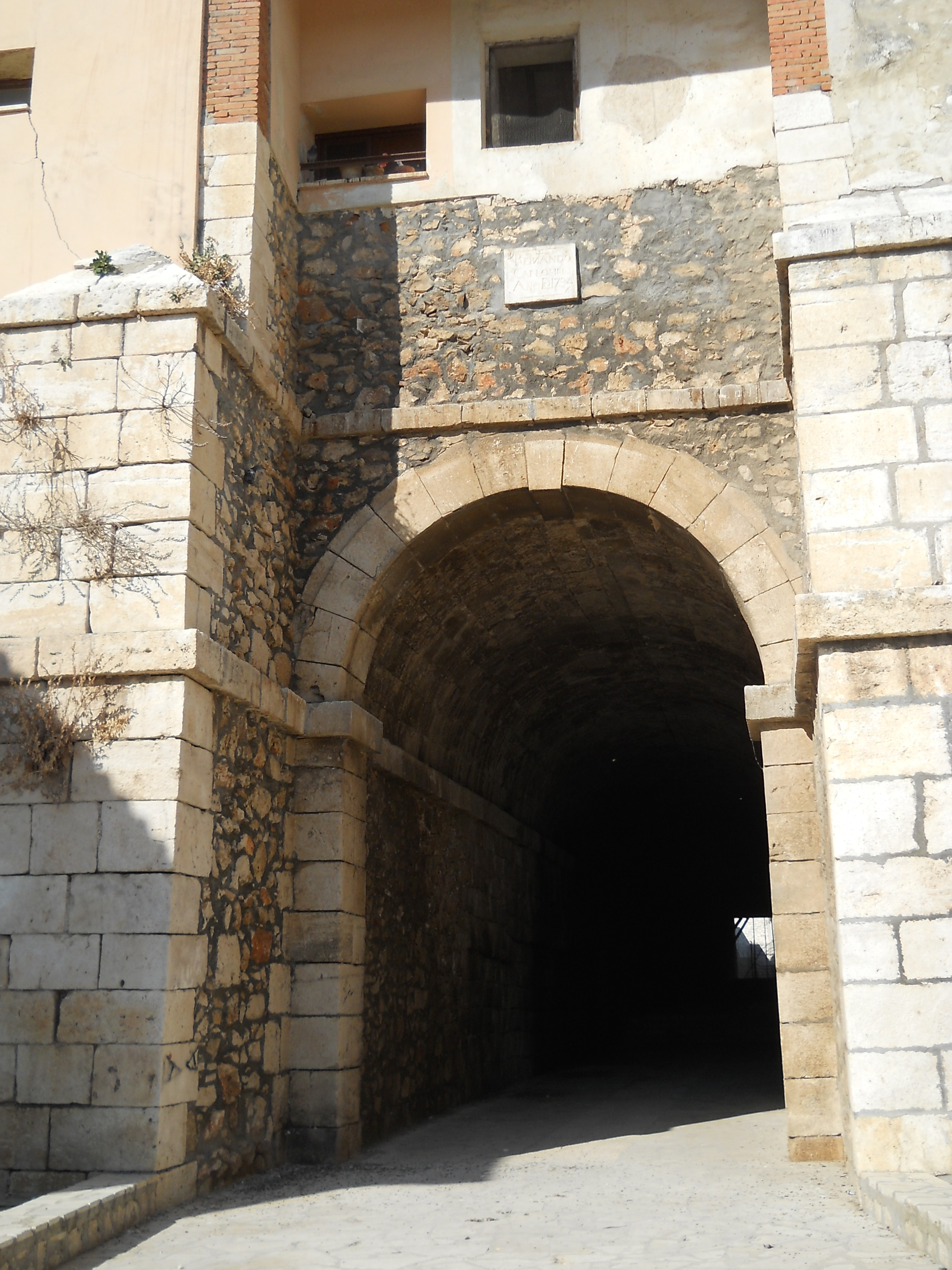
Arco de Zacatín

After the Roman conquest, Julius Caesar distributed the land among the veterans of his legions, creating rural Roman villas, being the most relevant the villa of Aurelia, which later became a renowned Roman, Hispano-Roman and Visigoth city, and the origin of the actual Colmenar de Oreja. At the time of the creation of the city of Aurelia, Colmenar already existed as a settlement linked to apiculture (colmenar in Spanish means apiary) and stonemasonry from the limestone quarries that still exist in the area. After the period of Roman and Visigothic domination, in the X Century, the Arabs built a fort between the City of Aurelia and the left bank of Tagus river, later known as the Castle of Aurelia or the Castle of Oreja. The Castle of Aurelia was, and its remains still are, of special significance, since, after several conquests and re-conquests of Aurelia, the city and its castle were finally conquered in 1139 AD by King Alfonso VII himself, a fact that resulted in the granting of the Fuero del Castillo de Oreja on November 3, 1139. This served as a model for other Fueros, such as Toledo or Madrid. This important document can be found in the National Historical Archive (Spain). In the year 1171, Alfonso VIII granted the Order of Santiago jurisdiction over a large part of the area established in the Fuero de Aurelia, "with the Castle of Oreja and villages", and, among them, the old Colmenar, being Grand Master Pedro Fernández de Fuentecalada. The population grouping policy of the Order of Santiago made Colmenar prosper enormously, to the detriment of the villages of Castellanos, San Miguel and San Pedro, which ended up disappearing.

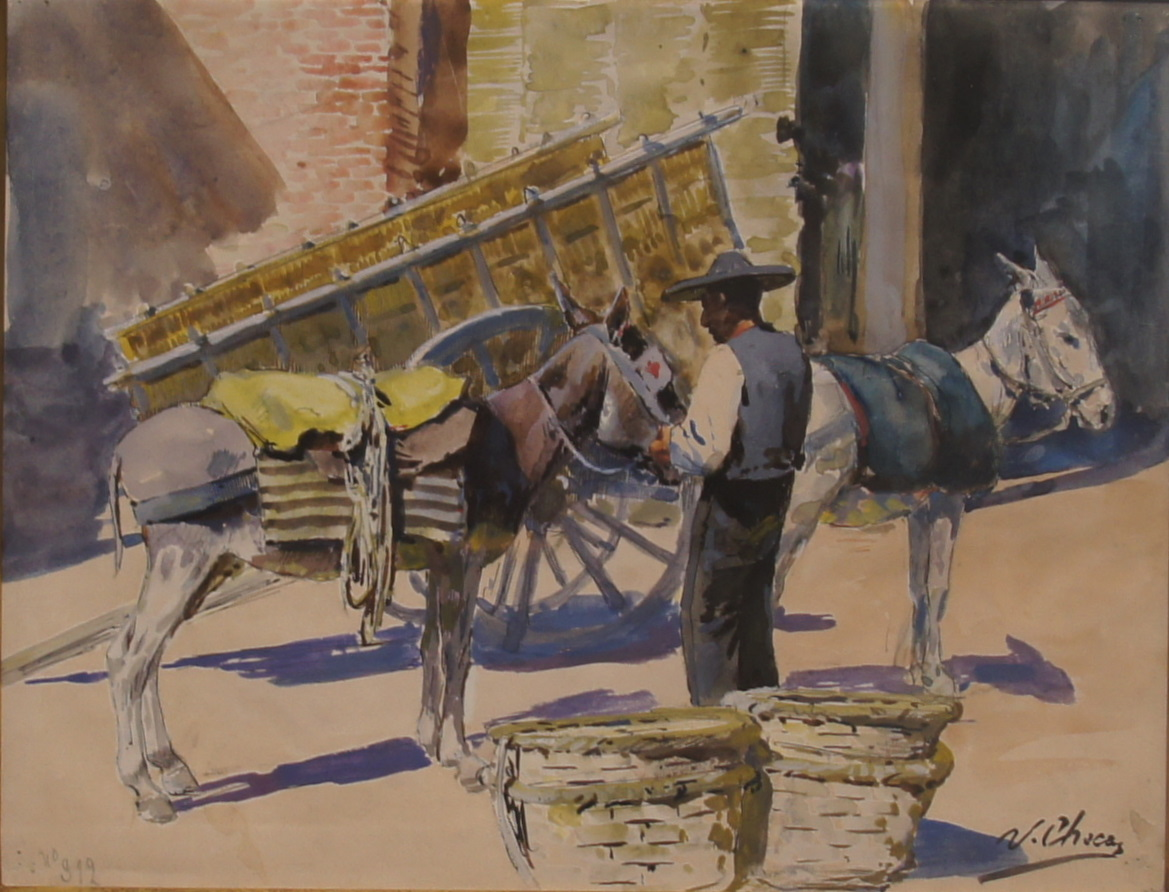
El vendimiador de Colmenar painted by Ulpiano Checa

After the Treaty of the Bulls of Guisando, Enrique IV, set up his Court in Colmenar de Oreja. Both Enrique IV and Isabel dictated numerous resolutions that appear signed and dated in Colmenar de Oreja, in whose Santa María la Mayor Church, the Count of Tendilla nailed the famous manifesto in favour of Juana la Beltraneja. Supporters and detractors of Princess Isabel sealed their peace in the transcendental Vistas de Colmenar de Oreja. In 1540, Carlos I of Spain granted Don Diego de Cárdenas y Enríquez the title of Primer Señor of Colmenar de Oreja y Oreja, in exchange for the Dehesas of Requena and La Puebla, among others. In 1625, the Señorío was transformed into Condado (County), and the first Count of Colmenar de Oreja and Señor de Oreja, Bernardino Ayala Cárdenas y Velasco, was the 8th Count of Fuensalida. Between 1500 and 1700, the successive kings of the House of Austria authorised or undertook the most important works carried out in Colmenar de Oreja: extension of the church of Santa María la Mayor (1517), repair of the wall (1517) and irrigation of the Vega (1572), foundation of the Franciscan Monastery of San Bernardino de Siena. (1570) and foundation of the Monastery of the Incarnation of the Augustinian Recollect Nuns (1685).

In 1922, Alfonso XIII of Spain granted the Title of City to Colmenar de Oreja as a reward for the many merits it had acquired throughout its history, coinciding with the prosperity of its industry and the strength of its agriculture. The town was declared Bien de Interés Cultural on December 26, 2013.

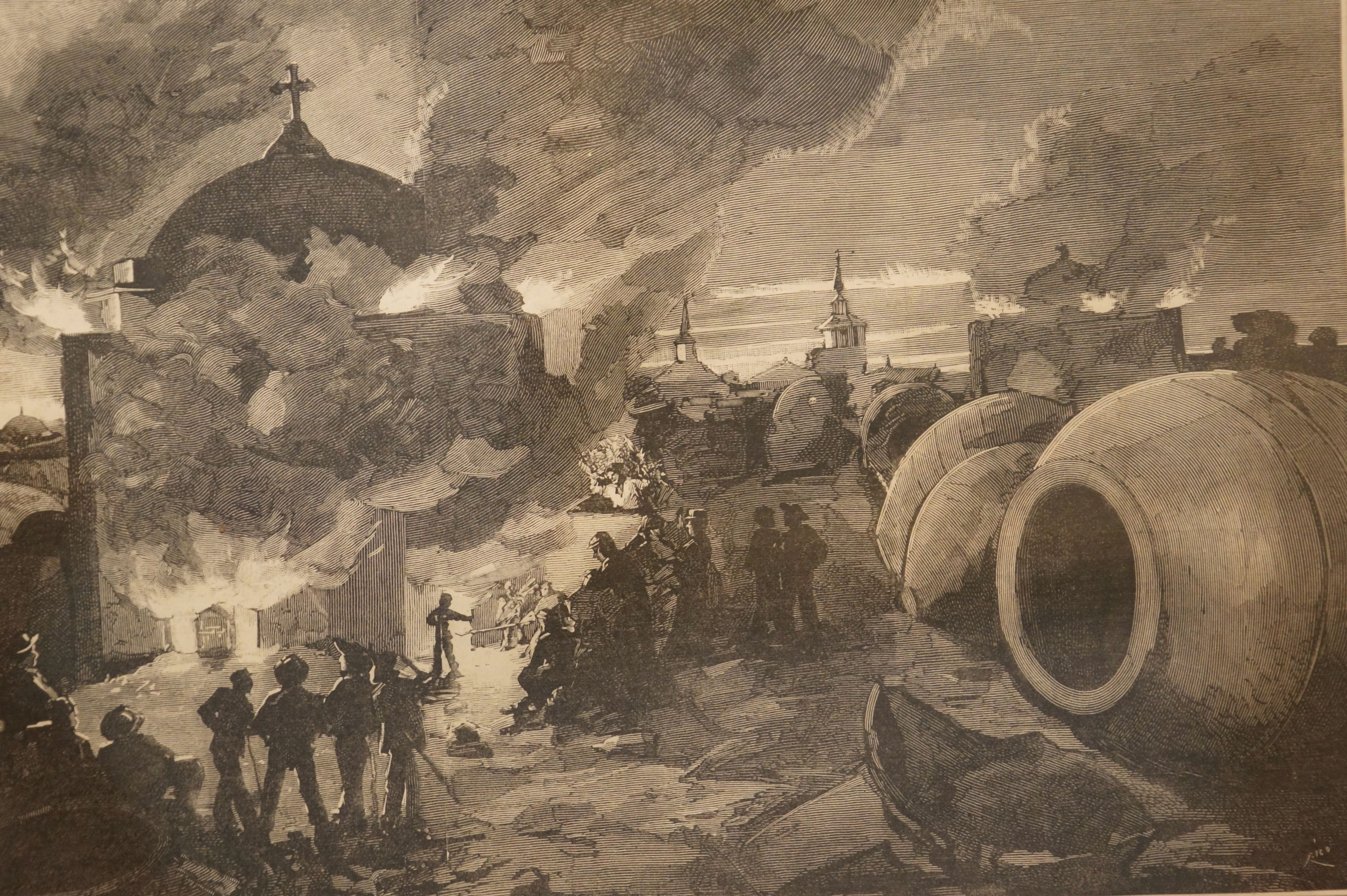
Fabricación de tinajones en Colmenar de Oreja by Ulpiano Checa (1882)

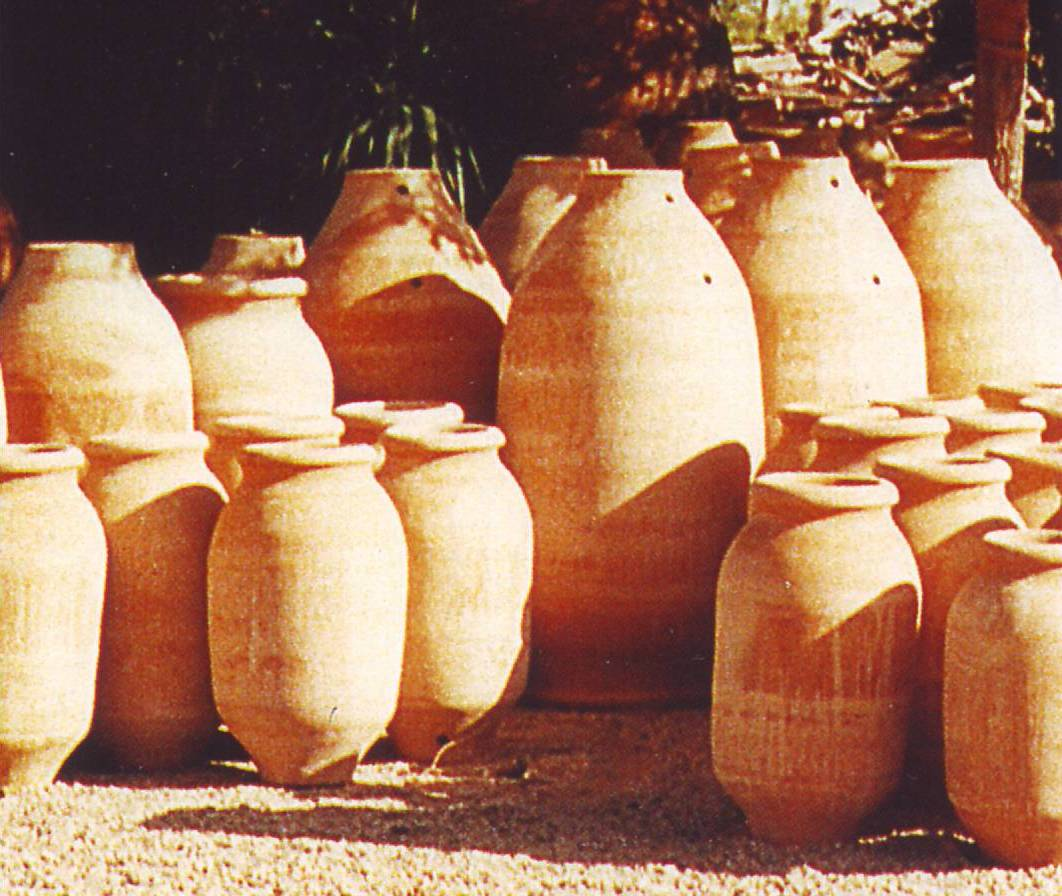
Tinajas (big jars) in Colmenar de Oreja

== Agriculture ==
Mainly vineyards and olives are grown. The cultivation of olive trees and the production of olive oil in Colmenar dates back to Roman times, when the town was known as Apis Aureliae. In 1750 there were 105 oil mills. In 1891 there were only 10 left in active production, which is now reduced to one (Cooperativa Aceite Santo Cristo), managed in the form of cooperative by the local farmers and oil producers themselves. The olive crops are 80% of the cornicabra variety (fine, elongated fruit) and the rest of the manzanilla variety.

Within the Denominación de Origen Vinos de Madrid Colmenar contributes with the production of wines from its nine wineries as one of the most important within the subzone of Arganda.

== Architecture ==
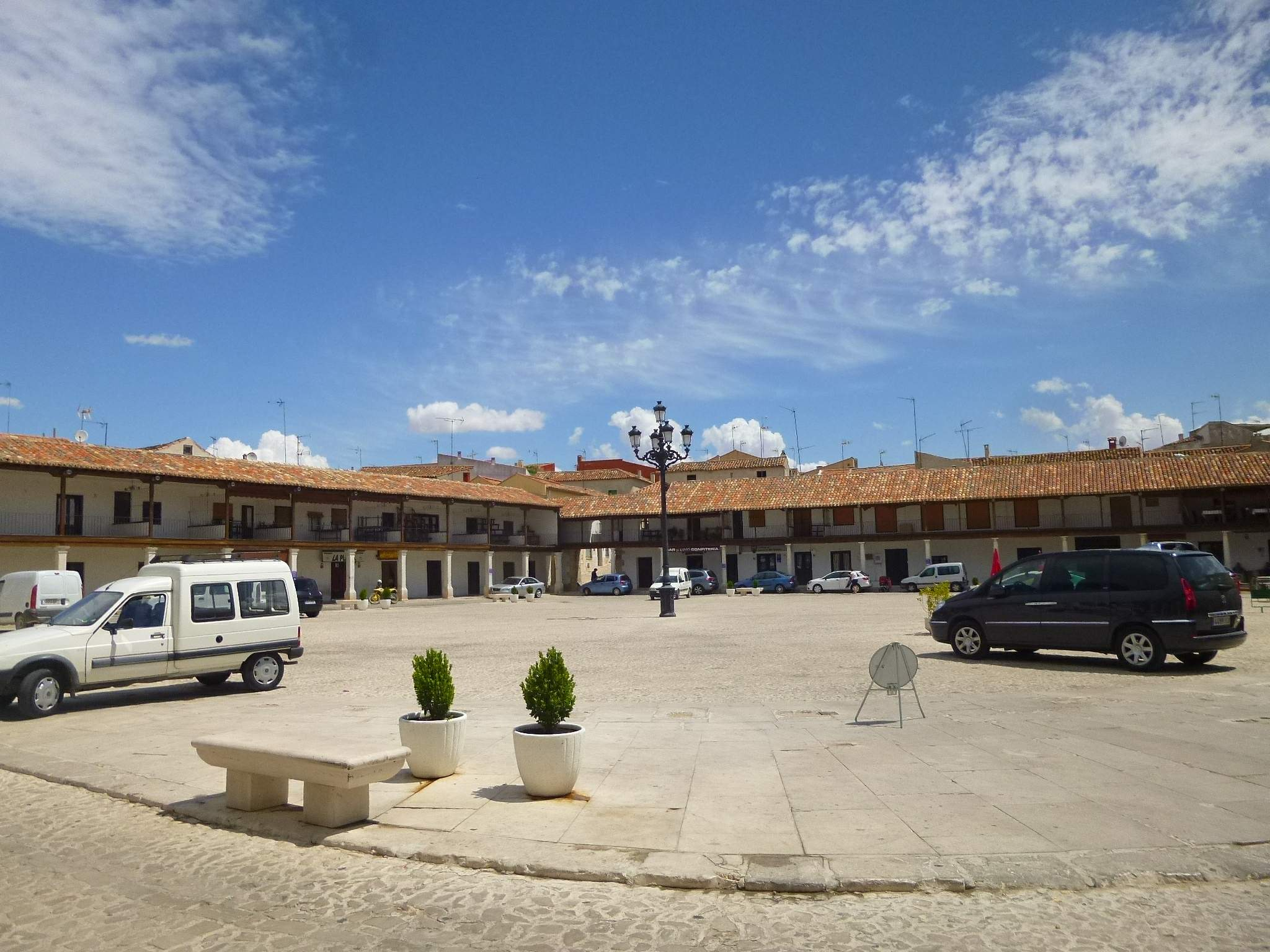
Plaza mayor

- Plaza Mayor (Main Square). The construction began in 1676, and the Plaza Mayor became one of the magnificent examples of typical Castilian arcaded squares when it was completed in 1794. The Town Hall and the Pósito Hall lay within the square. Its southern side faces a majestic architectural complex made up of the Zacatín Gardens, the mouth of the stone tunnel of the same name (Arco del Zacatín), which crosses under the square from one side to the other joining the two sides of the valley, and the watering holes. It has been the setting for many films and television series. During the Fiestas Populares (Popular Festivals) in both May and September, a portable wooden bullfighting ruedo is set up, to host traditional bullfighting festivals.
- Teatro Municipal Diéguez (City Theatre). This theatre is built on the site of the former Charity Hospital. In the 19th century it was called the Corral de Comedias and later Teatro de la Caridad. Today it is named after Antonio Diéguez Cruz, first actor within Teatro de la Comedia (Madrid), born in Colmenar in 1904.
- Ulpiano Checa Museum. It hosts the most extensive collection of the work of Ulpiano Checa (1860-1916), mostly historical painting from the end of the 19th century, orientalist painting and genre work. The building, which has been restored and extended, has its access through a small garden, where, in addition to the bust of the painter, there is a monument to the characteristic elements of the city: the limestone and the big terracotta jar (tinaja).

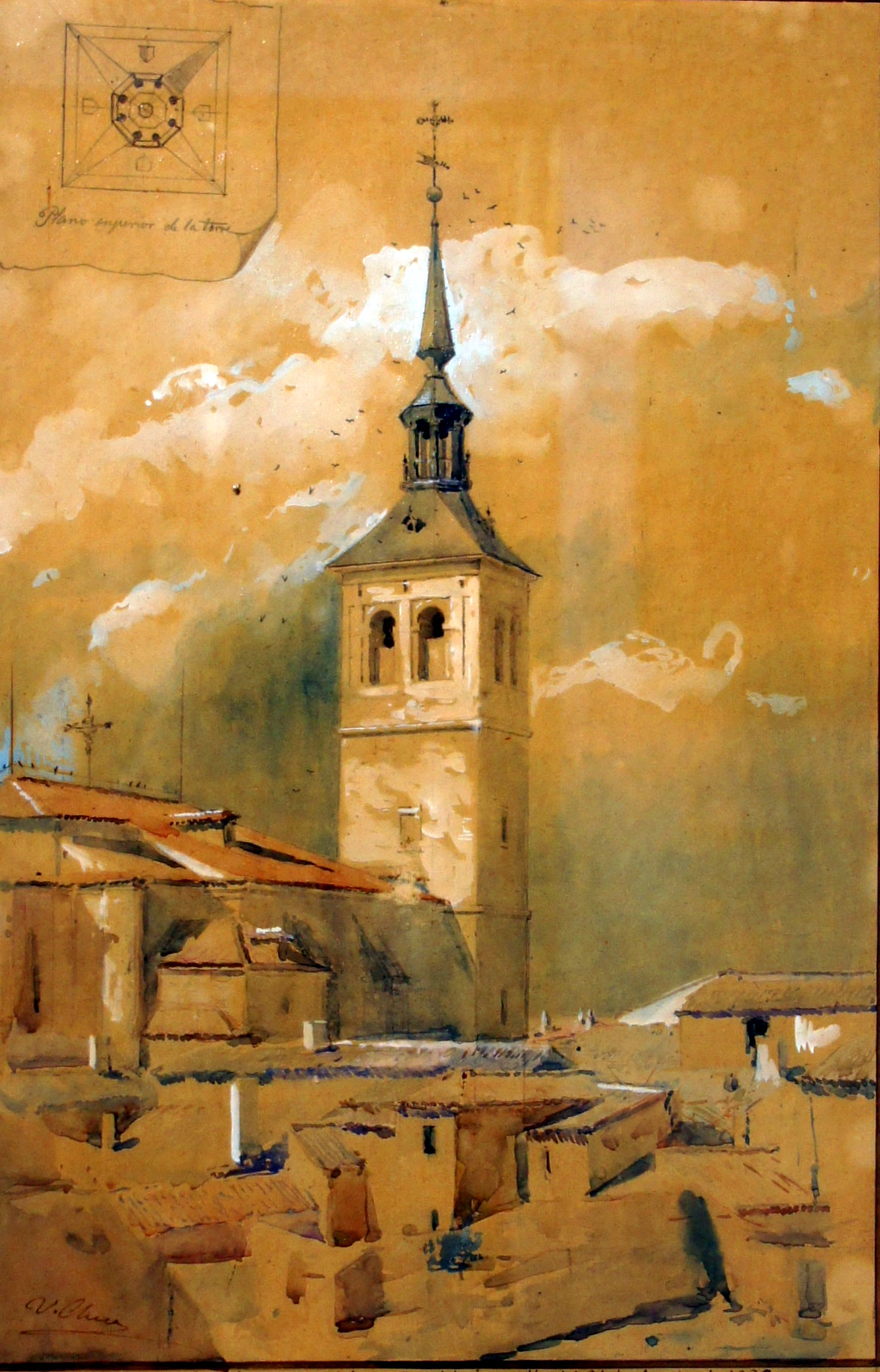
Santa María la Mayor church painted by Ulpiano Checa.

- Iglesia de Santa María la Mayor. Built by the Order of Santiago, in the second third of the 13th century, it was extended during the second half of the 16th century. In 2008, the paintings were restored and the floor was changed. In addition, since 2009 it has an organ built by the German organist Gerhard Grenzing, donated in its entirety by the neighboring María Pérez García, who wanted to contribute in this way to the heritage of Colmenar de Oreja.
- Ermita del Cristo del Humilladero. The Santísimo Cristo del Humilladero (Colmenar de Oreja Patron Saint) hermitage is considered the third most important monument in the city. The chapel groups together different constructions from different periods; a chapel from the 16th century, with a latin cross form plant and a tiny dome over the transept, to which later they added a dressing room on the back, a sacristy on the left side, and some rooms for the chaplain on the right side in baroque style, work of Bartolomé Valtierra.
- Convento de la Encarnación del Divino Verbo. It belongs to the Order of Augustinian Recollect Nuns and is known in Colmenar de Oreja as the Convento de las Monjas (Convent of the Nuns). It has an area of more than 7000 square meters and is composed of three bodies and an orchard. Built in the middle of the 17th century, it was founded in 1636 by Diego de Cárdenas and Catalina Ponce de León.

== Notable people ==
- Isidoro Arredondo (1655–1702), painter
- Ulpiano Checa (1860–1916), painter
- Manuel Blanco Játiva (1898–1952), flamenco singer
- Francisco López (1554), painter
- José María Moralejo (1774–1849), writer
- Diego de Cárdenas y Enríquez, in 1540, Carlos V granted him the title of first Señor de Colmenar de Oreja y Oreja
- Marcela de Ulloa (?-1669), maid of honor of the infanta Margarita Teresa de Austria
