= Ajalvir =

- Municipality
- Villa de Ajalvir
- Flag Coat of arms

- Location of Ajalvir in Madrid

- Location in Spain
- Coordinates: 40°32′N 3°28′W
- Country: Spain
- Autonomous community: Madrid
- Province: Madrid
- Comarca: Alcalá
- Judicial district: Torrejón de Ardoz

Government
  - Mayor: Víctor Miguel Malo Gómez (AIA)

Area
  - Total: 19.62 km^{2} (7.58 sq mi)
- Elevation: 647 m (2,123 ft)
- Lowest elevation: 0 m (0 ft)

Population (2025-01-01)
  - Total: 4,868
  - Density: 248.1/km^{2} (642.6/sq mi)
- Demonyms: Ajalvireño, ña
- Time zone: UTC+1 (CET)
  - Summer (DST): UTC+2 (CEST)
- Postal code: 28864
- Website: Official website

Ajalvir (Spanish pronunciation: [axalˈβiɾ]) is a town and municipality in the Autonomous Community of Madrid in central Spain, located 26 kilometres (16 mi) north-east of Madrid and 12 kilometres (7.5 mi) from Alcalá de Henares. It is located in the comarca of Alcalá.

The name Ajalvir is believed to have derived from the Arabic al-jalaoui, meaning isolated or separated.

== Geography ==
Ajalvir is bordered to the north with Cobeña, to the east with Daganzo de Arriba, to the west with Paracuellos de Jarama and to the south with Torrejón de Ardoz. The town is crossed right by its centre by a creek, possibly a tributary of the "de la Huelga" stream. The area is slightly hilly, the highest peak is called "Cabeza Gorda" (fat head) of 767 meters, close to the "cerro del tordo" (hill of the thrush).

== Politics ==
Since the 2023 elections, the municipality has been led by a local party.

Party	Votes	%	+/-	Seats	+/-
Agrupación Independiente de Ajalvir	980	42.25	▲13.48	5	▲2
PP	604	26.04	▼6.9	3	▼1
Más Madrid/Verdes Equo Ajalvir	312	13.45	New	1	New
Vox	193	8.32	▲3.47	1	▲1
PSOE	176	7.58	▼14.56	1	▼2
Podemos/IU/AV	22	0.94	▼1.95	0	0

== Bus ==
- 215: Torrejón de Ardoz-Paracuellos del Jarama. (ALSA)
- 251: Torrejón de Ardoz-Valdeavero-Alcalá de Henares. (ALSA)
- 252: Torrejón de Ardoz-Daganzo-Alcalá de Henares. (ALSA)
- 254: Valdeolmos/Fuente el Saz-Alcalá de Henares. (ALSA)
- 256: Madrid (Canillejas)-Daganzo-Valdeavero. (ALSA)
- N204: Madrid (Canillejas)-Paracuellos-Daganzo. (night bus line) (ALSA)
