= Valdetorres de Jarama =

- Municipality
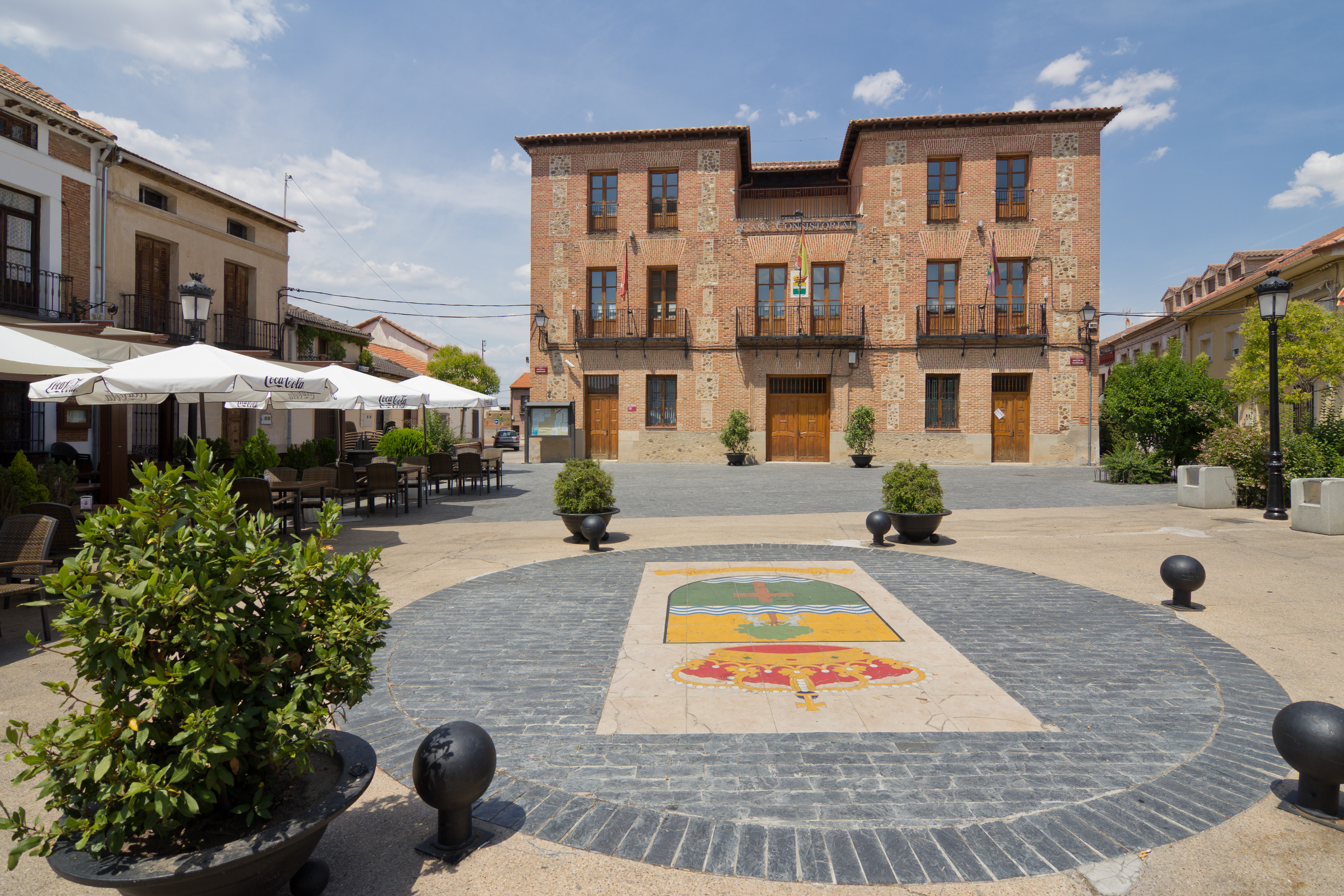
- Town hall

- Coat of arms

- Location in Spain
- Coordinates: 40°41′43″N 3°30′49″W
- Country: Spain
- Autonomous community: Community of Madrid
- Province: Madrid
- Comarca: Comarca de Alcalá

Government
  - Mayor: José Sánchez Sánchez

Area
  - Total: 33.52 km^{2} (12.94 sq mi)

Population (2025-01-01)
  - Total: 5,175
  - Density: 154.4/km^{2} (399.9/sq mi)
- Time zone: UTC+1 (CET)
  - Summer (DST): UTC+2 (CEST)
- Postal code: 28150

Valdetorres de Jarama is a municipality of the Community of Madrid, Spain.

Sights include the Church of la Natividad de Nuestra Señora.
