= San Martín de la Vega =

- Municipality
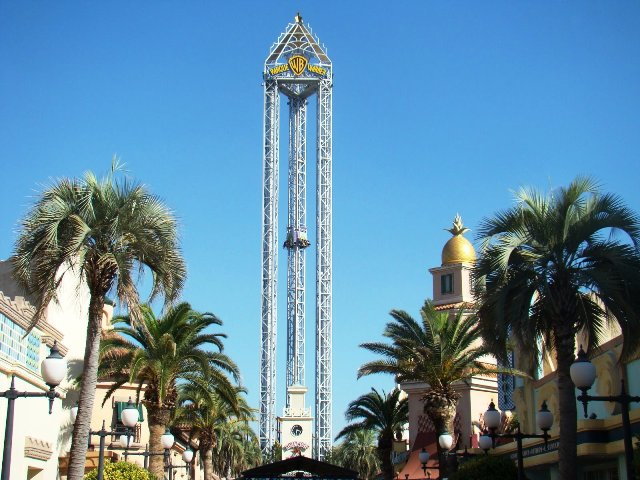

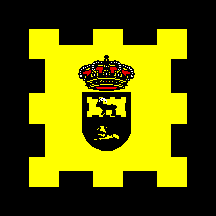
- Flag Coat of arms

- Location in the Community of Madrid.

- Location in Spain
- Coordinates: 40°12′34″N 3°34′20″W
- Country: Spain
- Autonomous community: Madrid
- Province: Madrid
- Comarca: Las Vegas
- Municipality: San Martín de la Vega
- Commonwealth: Las Vegas

Government
  - Alcaldesa: Carmen Guijorro Belinchón (PP (PArtido Popular))

Area
  - Total: 105.9 km^{2} (40.9 sq mi)
- Elevation: 515 m (1,690 ft)

Population (2025-01-01)
  - Total: 21,010
  - Density: 198.4/km^{2} (513.8/sq mi)
- Demonym: Sanmartineros
- Time zone: UTC+1 (CET)
  - Summer (DST): UTC+2 (CEST)
- Postal code: 28330
- Official language(s): Spanish
- Website: Official website

San Martín de la Vega is a Spanish municipality located in Comarca de Las Vegas, Community of Madrid. It had a population of 19,927 in 2022.

Its church is dedicated to Natividad de Nuestra Señora (16th-18th centuries). The Spanish Warner Bros. Park is located in its area.
