= Ulpiano Checa =

Spanish painter, sculptor, poster designer and illustrator (1860–1916)

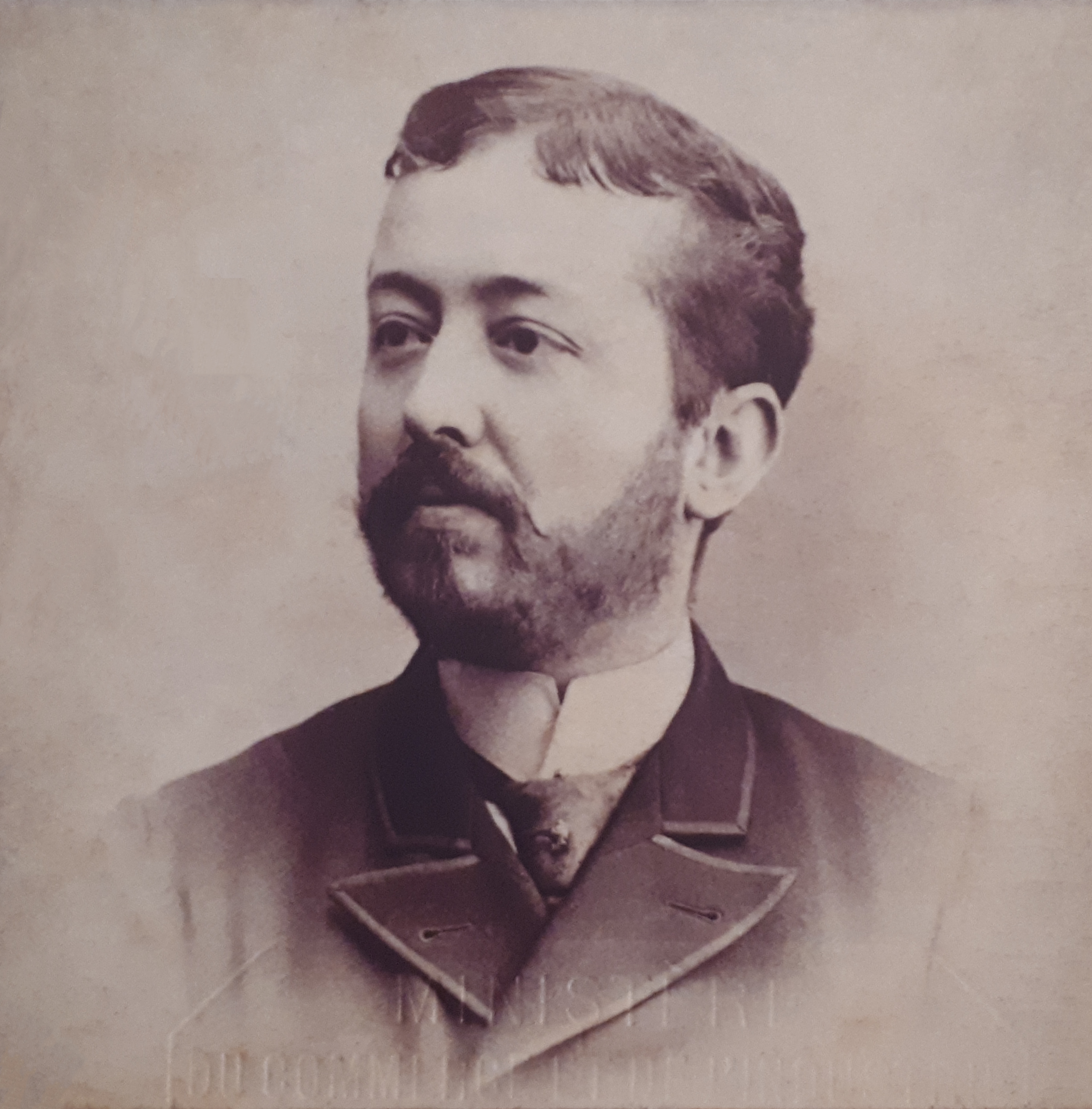
- Born: Ulpiano Fernández-Checa y Sanz; 3 April 1860; Colmenar de Oreja, Spain
- Died: 5 January 1916 (aged 55)
- Education: Escuela de Bellas Artes de San Fernando; Spanish Academy of Fine Arts in Rome

Ulpiano Fernández-Checa y Sanz (3 April 1860 – 5 January 1916), known as Ulpiano Checa, was a Spanish painter, sculptor, poster designer and illustrator. He used both impressionistic and academic techniques, and mainly painted historical subjects.

== Biography ==
He was born in Colmenar de Oreja, Spain, and exhibited a talent for art when he was a young child. At thirteen, he met Don José Ballester, the husband of a neighbor in Colmenar, who owned the Cafe de la Concepción in Madrid. Ballester was impressed with his work and, after consultation with Luis Taberner (1844–1900), a recognized and popular artist in Madrid, Ballester decided to bring Checa and his family to the capital to begin his art studies.

In 1873, he entered the Escuela de Bellas Artes de San Fernando in Madrid, followed by study at the Spanish Academy of Fine Arts in Rome, where he would paint Invasion of the Barbarians (since lost in a fire) which won the gold medal at the National Exhibition of Fine Arts in 1887.

=== Early career ===
During his formative years, Checa was directed by Alejandro Ferrant, Federico de Madrazo, and Manuel Dominguez. He was an outstanding student, which led him to get two grants for painting, and a position as assistant professor in the subject of perspective. During the years 1880–1881, he left school to begin work as an artist. He worked as an assistant to Manuel Dominguez in the decoration of the Palace of Linares and the Basilica San Francisco el Grande, two of the largest decorative projects in Madrid during the last decades of the century.

To mark the bicentenary of the death of Calderón de la Barca, he made his first contribution, an illustration, to La Ilustración Española y Americana. Interested in current artistic trends, he moved within the cultural circles of Madrid, and served as a founding member of the Círculo de Bellas Artes of Madrid.

In 1884, he obtained a pension that enabled him to study at the Academy of Fine Arts in Rome. A year later, during the final year of his pension, he travelled to Paris and participated in the Salon of the Champs Elysees with his version of The Rape of Proserpina, causing dissent within the Spanish Academy. After completing his studies, he applied for another pension for the Academy in Rome, but it was awarded to Mariano Benlliure.

=== Move to Paris ===
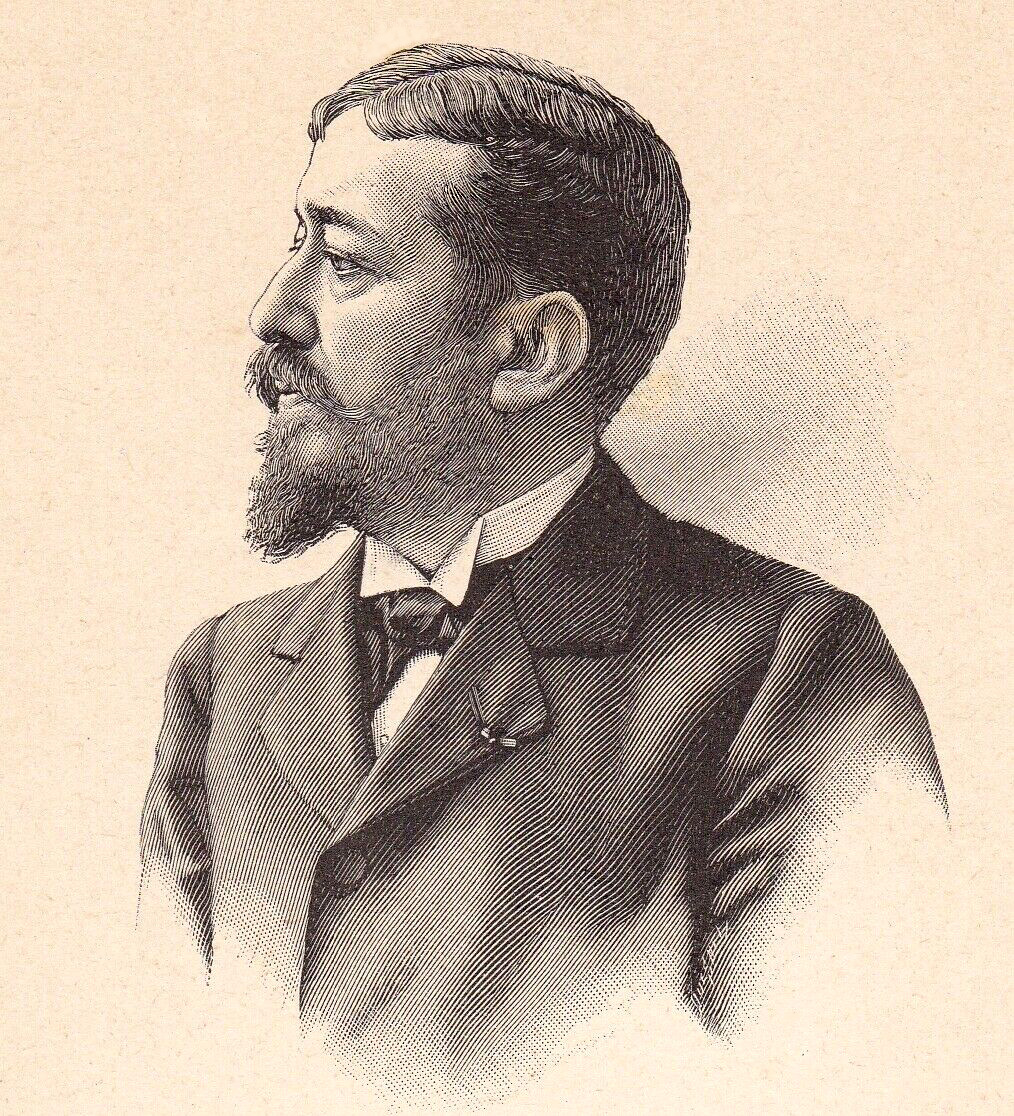
Ulpiano Checa, from Figures contemporaines tirées de l’Album Mariani by Joseph Uzanne (1903)

Checa fixed his gaze upon Paris, which was by then the cultural center of Europe. In 1889, he settled there and participated in the World's Fair, held in Paris that year, with his painting In the Church, which was awarded third prize. He met Matilde Chayé (1864–1945), herself a painter, from a prominent Gascon family of Argentine origin, and in 1890 they married. Checa now split his time between Paris and Bagnères-de-Bigorre, the small town in the Hautes-Pyrénées where his wife's family lived. He never forgot his origins, and returned to Spain on several occasions to spend time resting and visiting friends and relatives in Colmenar de Oreja. His restless spirit and their economic position allowed him to travel around the world and this made him an artist of international fame. In 1890, he had his first critical triumph in the Salón de Paris, the annual exhibition of the Academy of Arts in Paris; presenting his painting of a chariot race and winning third prize. His name became well-known in art circles and he was considered to be one of the most promising Spanish painters who worked in the French capital. A year later, the Spanish government awarded him the Order of Charles III.

Checa participated in numerous shows, both in and outside of Paris, and won prizes in many of them. He also entered shows throughout Europe, and in Argentina, Brazil, Algeria and Tunisia. In 1894 the French government awarded him the Legion of Honor. The following year, he had his first solo exhibition at the galleries of Georges Petit, in which he introduced nearly sixty new works. That same year he was a jury member of the committee charged with organizing a celebration of the centenary of lithography.

In 1897, he ventured into other art forms. At this time he received a commission from the Union of Thermal Baths, located in Bagnerès-de-Bigorre, to produce advertising posters. He also created his first book illustrations for Espagne. Le Généralife. Sérénades et Songes by Zacharie Astruc. During the summer months, he painted two murals in the chancel of the parish of Santa Maria Maggiore; on the left wall was the Annunciation and, on the right, a Presentation of the Virgin. Years later he made a third mural, of Saint Christopher.

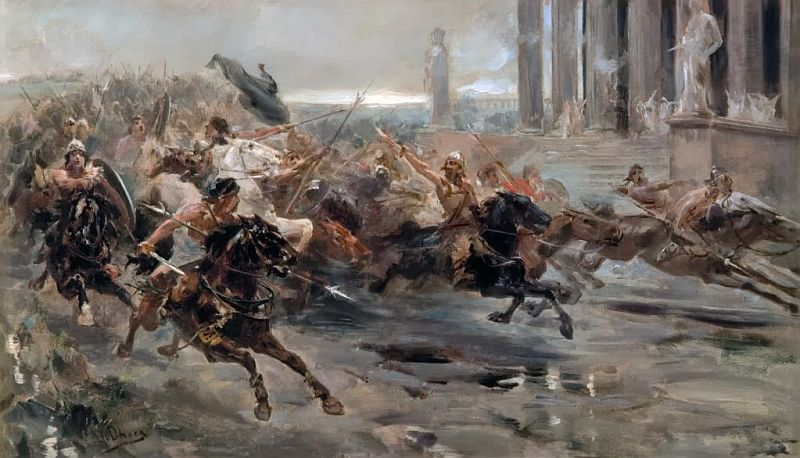
Invasion of the Barbarians, 1887

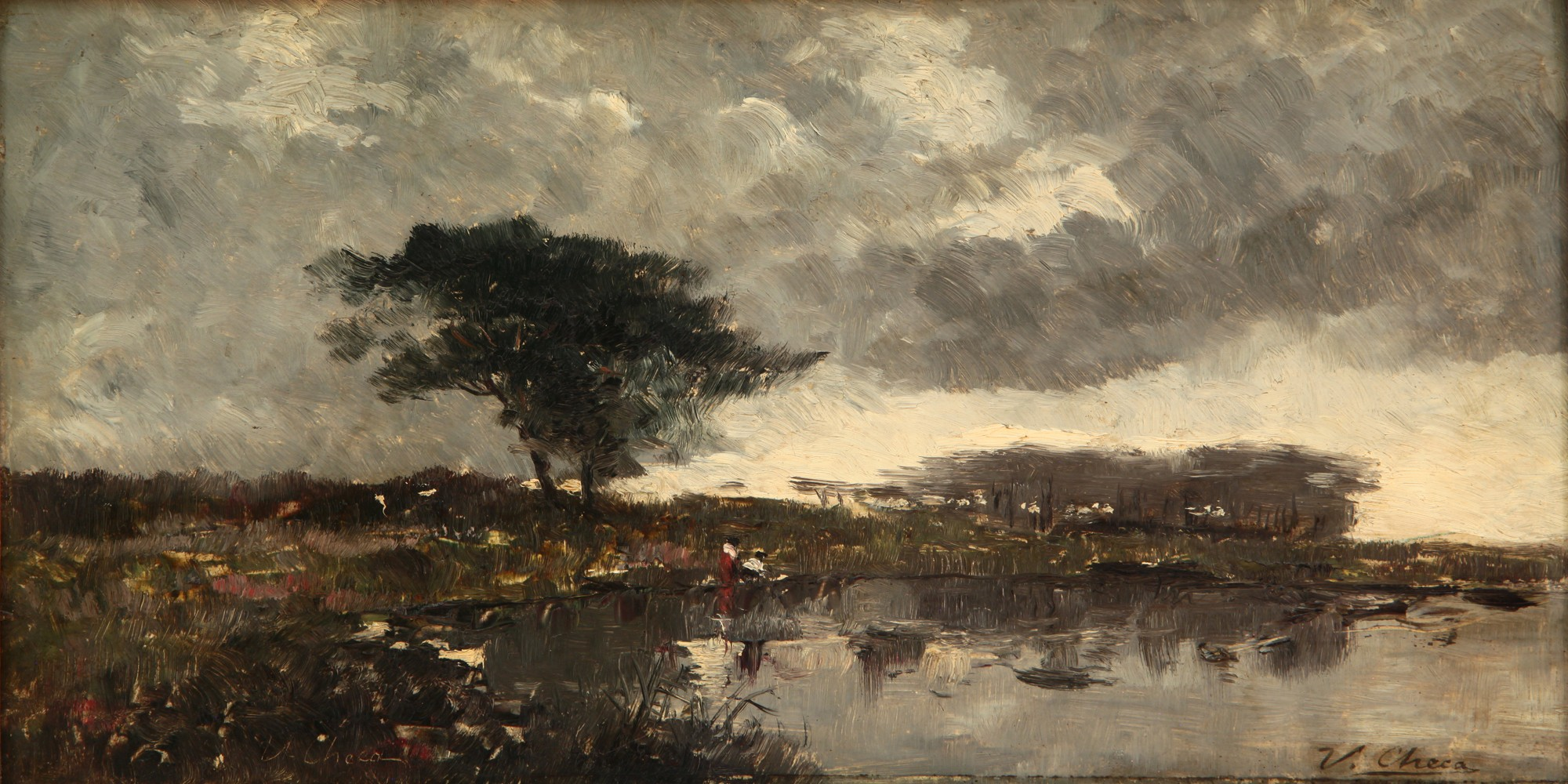
Roman Bathers

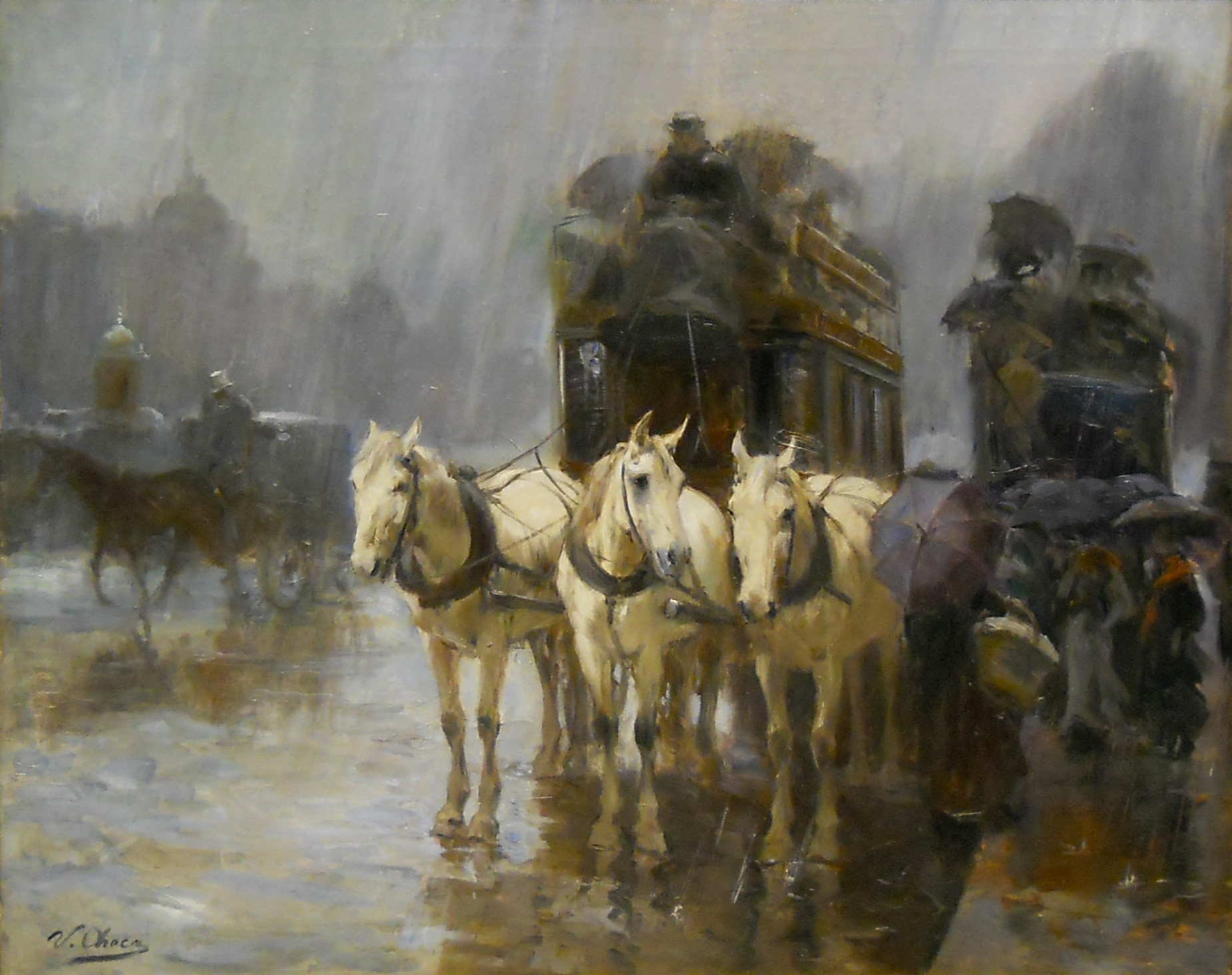
Rainy Day in Paris

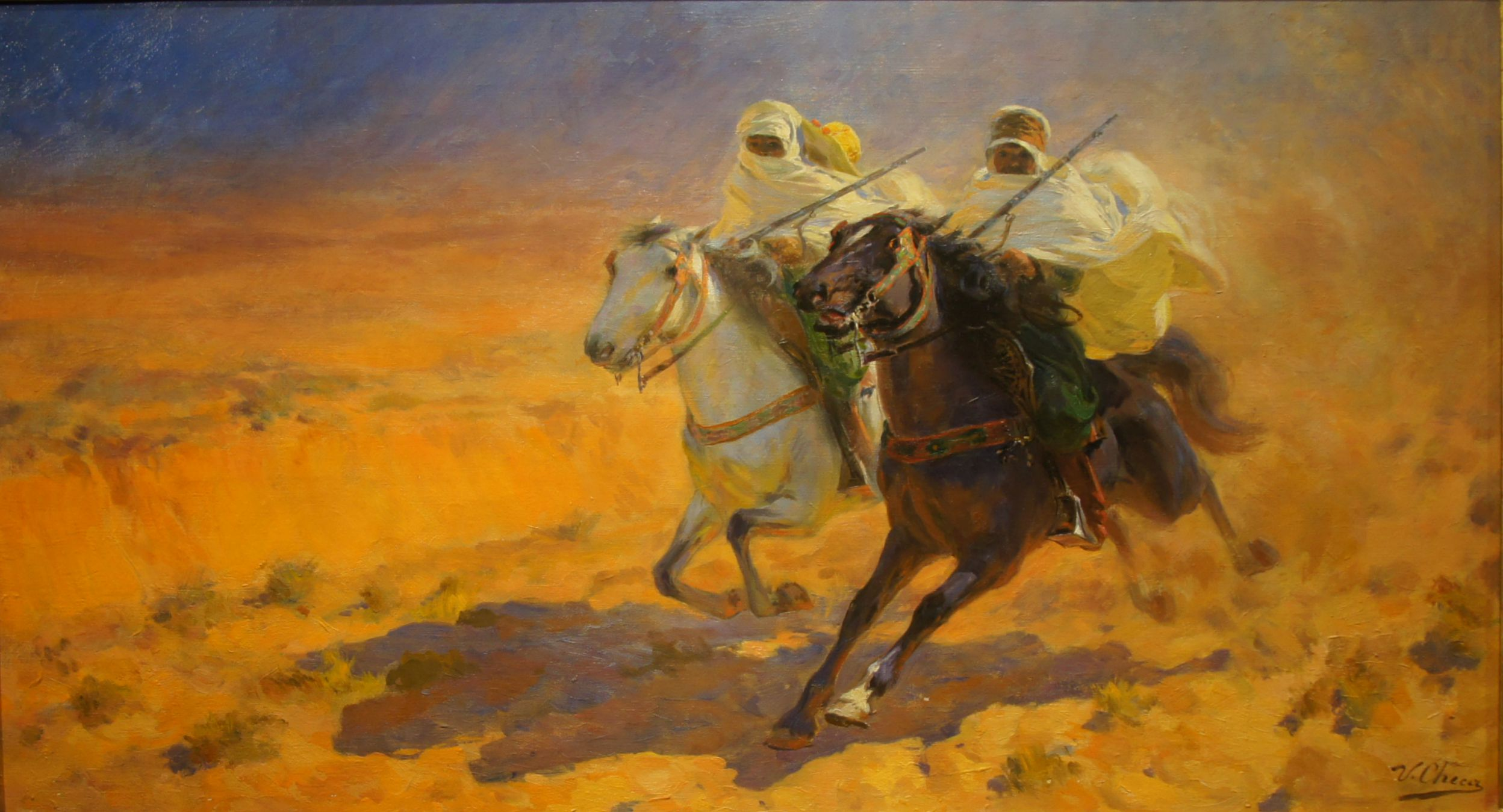
Between the Oases

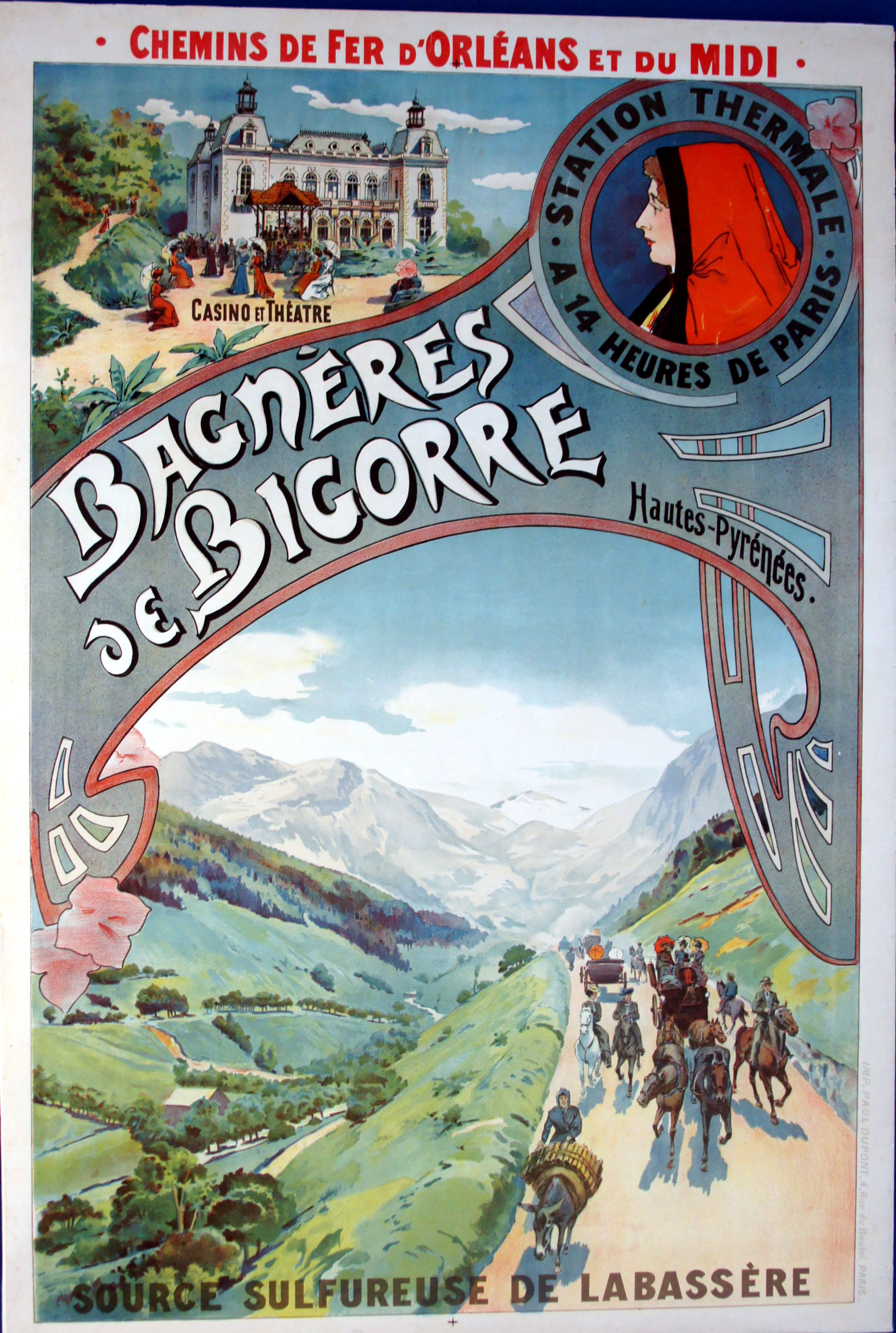
Poster for the Thermal Baths

=== Later successes ===
The year 1900 was very productive. He published his Treatise on Perspective, won a gold medal at the Exposition Universelle for The Last Days of Pompeii and painted the small dome of "Le Train Bleu", a restaurant at the Gare de Lyon that was decorated by numerous contemporary artists.

In 1901, he was commissioned to design the costumes for a silent film version of Quo Vadis?, directed by Lucien Nonguet. In 1902, after attending the first exhibition of Spanish artists living in France at the Modern Artists Gallery, he traveled to Argentina and Uruguay. He made this trip to settle his wife's financial affairs, but, after learning of the important art market that was developing there, he extended his stay for several months.

He exhibited in major galleries in Azul, Buenos Aires and Montevideo. There, he met Juan Zorrilla de San Martín, who suggested that Checa illustrate his new book, Tabaré, which was published in 1904. The following year, he traveled to Italy, where he painted a great number of works, and a year later returned to Buenos Aires to paint the portrait of the recently deceased General Bartolomé Mitre.

Algeria was one of his favorite destinations. He continued to travel there frequently until 1910. In addition to his Orientalist paintings, he documented and participated in various exhibitions. In 1908, he was one of the illustrators for another book by Astruc called Les Alhambras. Two years later, although ill with uremia and continuing to work, his production began to decline. He also continued sending paintings to the Salon in Paris and, in 1912, staged a solo exhibition at the Gallerie Imberti in Bordeaux. That same year, the Tunisian government awarded him the Order of Glory.

After World War I broke out, he left Paris to settle in Bagnères-de-Bigorre. Soon he moved to the nearby town of Dax where he died on January 5, 1916. Following his wishes, as expressed in his will, his remains were transferred to Colmenar de Oreja, where he was buried. His wife was later placed there beside him.

== See also ==
- Orientalism
- List of Orientalist artists
