= Church of San Cipriano (Cobeña) =

Building in Cobeña, Spain

- Iglesia Parroquial de San Cipriano (Spanish)
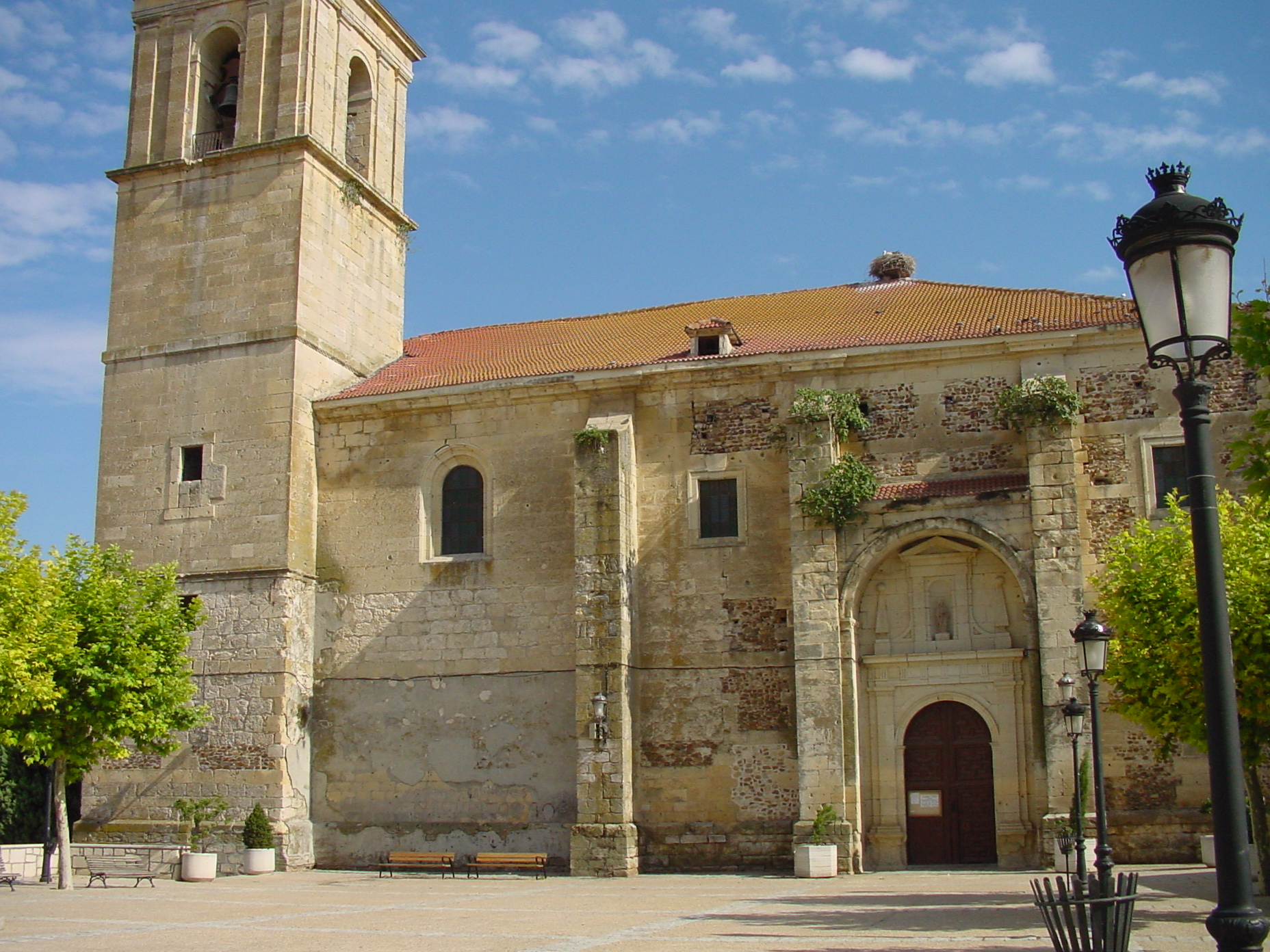

- Location within Spain
- 40.567284°N 3.504816°W
- Location: Cobeña, Spain

Spanish Cultural Heritage
- Official name: Iglesia Parroquial de San Cipriano
- Type: Non-movable
- Criteria: Monument
- Designated: 1996
- Reference no.: RI-51-0009562

The Church of San Cipriano (Spanish: Iglesia Parroquial de San Cipriano) is a church located in Cobeña, Spain. It was declared Bien de Interés Cultural in 1996.
