= Church of la Natividad de Nuestra Señora, Valdetorres de Jarama =

Church in Community of Madrid, Spain

Church of la Natividad de Nuestra Señora
- Iglesia Parroquial de la Natividad de Nuestra Señora (Spanish)
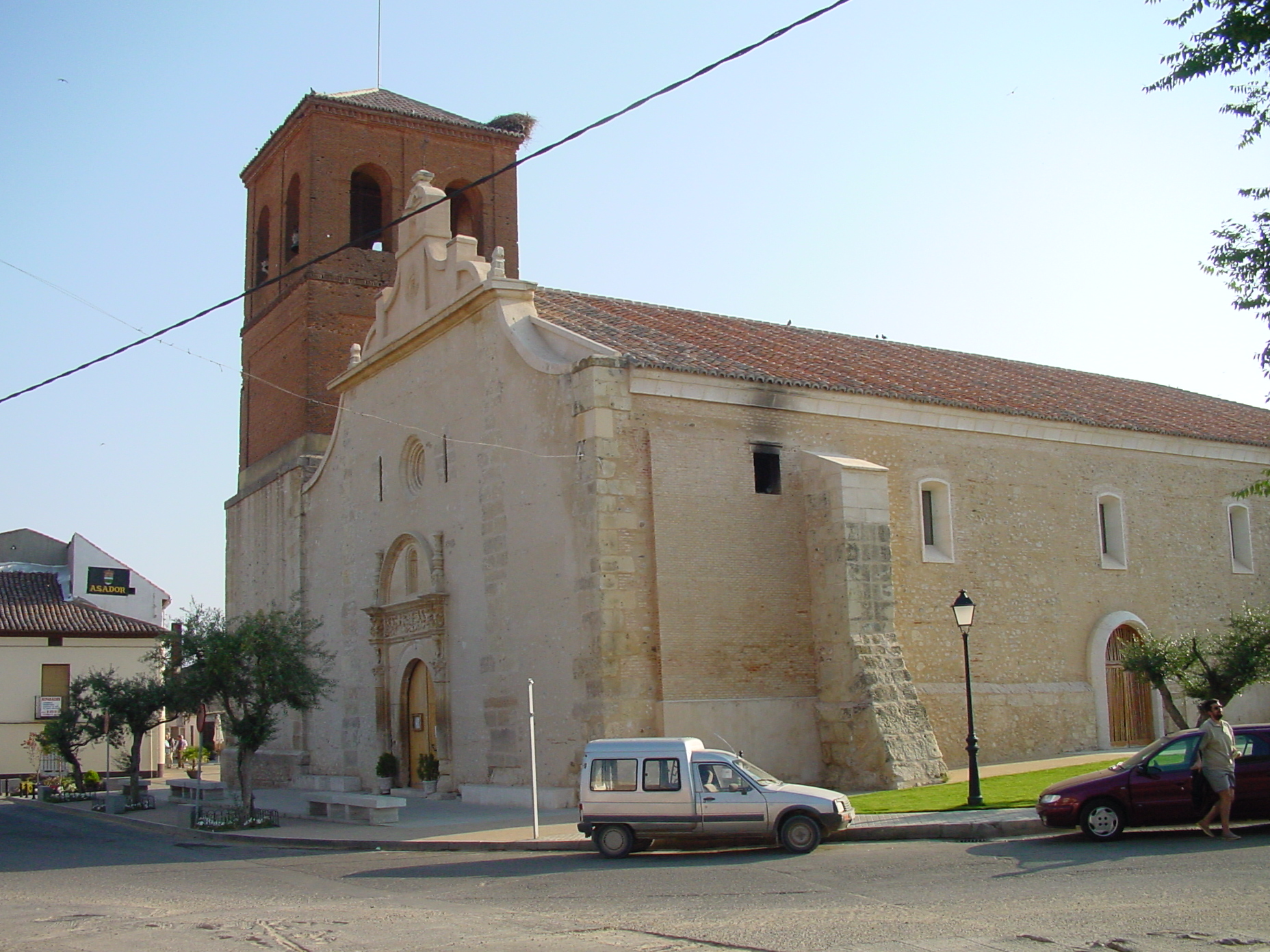

- Location within Spain
- 40.694688°N 3.51256°W
- Location: Valdetorres de Jarama, Spain

Spanish Cultural Heritage
- Official name: Iglesia Parroquial de la Natividad de Nuestra Señora
- Type: Non-movable
- Criteria: Monument
- Designated: 1996
- Reference no.: RI-51-0009114

The Church of la Natividad de Nuestra Señora (Spanish: Iglesia Parroquial de la Natividad de Nuestra Señora) is a church located in Valdetorres de Jarama, Spain. Church construction began in the 16th century, and was rebuilt at the beginning of the 17th century. It was declared Bien de Interés Cultural in 1996.
