= Anchuelo =

Coordinates: 40°28′N 3°16′W

- Municipality
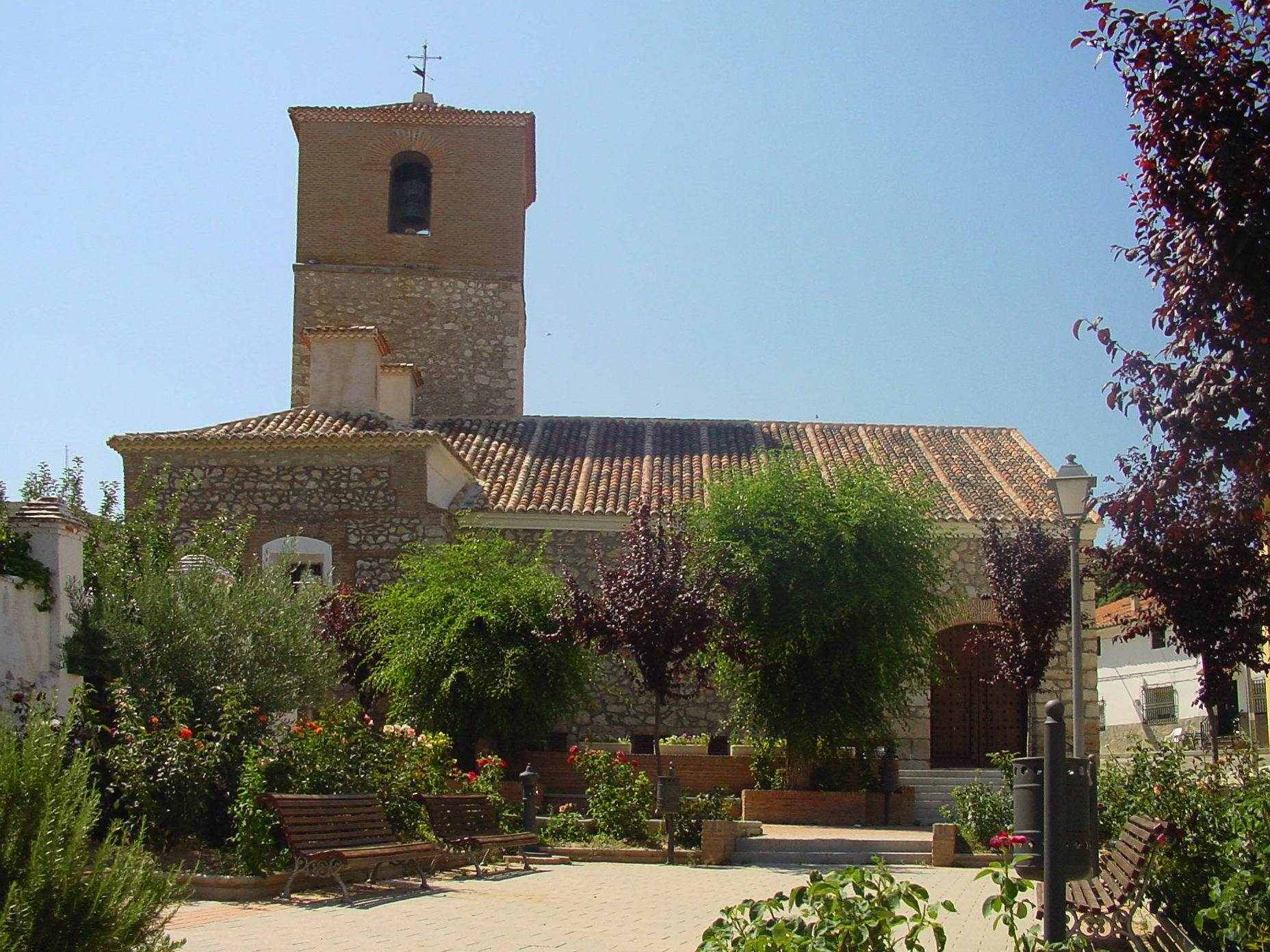

- Municipal location within the Community of Madrid.
- Country: Spain
- Autonomous community: Community of Madrid

Area
  - Total: 8.32 sq mi (21.55 km^{2})

Population (2025-01-01)
  - Total: 1,414
- Time zone: UTC+1 (CET)
  - Summer (DST): UTC+2 (CEST)

Anchuelo (Spanish pronunciation: [anˈtʃwelo]) is a municipality in the autonomous community of the Community of Madrid in central Spain. It belongs to the comarca of Alcalá.
