= Carabaña =

- Flag Coat of arms

- Location of Carabaña in Madrid

- Location in Spain
- Coordinates: 40°15′N 3°14′W
- Country: Spain
- Autonomous community: Madrid

Area
  - Total: 49 km^{2} (19 sq mi)
- Elevation: 625 m (2,051 ft)

Population (2025-01-01)
  - Total: 2,451
  - Density: 50/km^{2} (130/sq mi)
- Time zone: UTC+1 (CET)
  - Summer (DST): UTC+2 (CEST)
- Website: https://www.ayuntamientocarabaña.es/

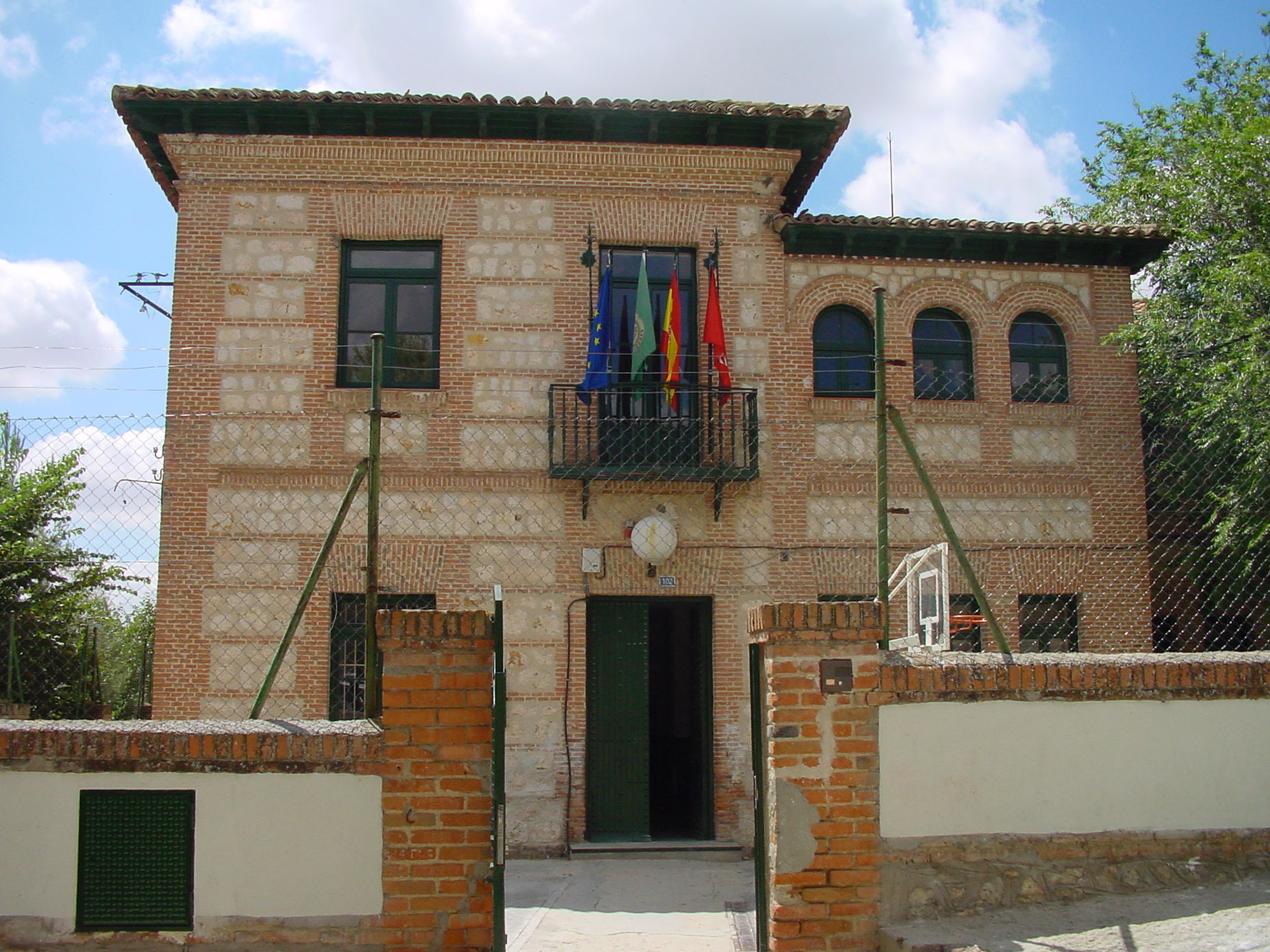
Carabaña Public School

Carabaña (Spanish pronunciation: [kaɾaˈβaɲa]) is a small municipality in the autonomous community of Madrid in central Spain. It is located 50 km from Madrid close to the Autovía A-3, the main highway to Valencia, on the banks of the Tajuña River at a height of 625 m above sea level. As of 2006 it had a population of 1,681.

== History ==
Carabaña was on the Roman road that ran from Mérida to Tarragona, and was also a Visigothic settlement.

With more than 2000 years of history, Carabaña is one of the oldest towns in Madrid community. Its origins date from the pre-Roman epoch of Celtiberians, who knew this town as Caraca.

== Water ==
Carabaña is famous for its waters (Agua de Carabaña) which are said to have healthful properties. The natural spring (4 km from the town at the location known as Cabeza Gorda) has been known and used locally since the times of the Ancient Romans. At the end of the 19th century, Ruperto García Chávarri had it analysed and scientifically confirmed its laxative and curative properties in relation to the digestive system, intestines, liver, and skin, due to its high mineral salt content. On 4 May 1928, it was officially declared to be of Public Utility.

== Monuments ==
- Parish Church of the Assumption (16th century), rebuilt after the Spanish Civil War
- Fountain of Carlos III, in the Main Square (Plaza Mayor)
- Palace of the Viceroy of the Indies (16th century)
- Hermitage of Santa Lucía
- Bridge over River Tajuña (17th century)
- Visigothic necropolis
- Prehistoric caves

== Cycle Path ==
The Vía Verde del Tajuña cycle path passes through Carabaña as it follows the course of the old railway line close to the banks of the River Tajuña. It starts in Morata de Tajuña (20 km downstream) and ends in Ambite (14 km upstream).
