= Pozuelo del Rey =

Coordinates: 40°22′N 3°19′W

- Municipality
- Flag Coat of arms

- Municipal location within the Community of Madrid.
- Country: Spain
- Autonomous community: Community of Madrid

Population (2025-01-01)
  - Total: 1,302
- Time zone: UTC+1 (CET)
  - Summer (DST): UTC+2 (CEST)

Pozuelo del Rey is a municipality of the Community of Madrid, Spain.
