= Germán Hernández Amores =

Spanish painter (1823–1894)

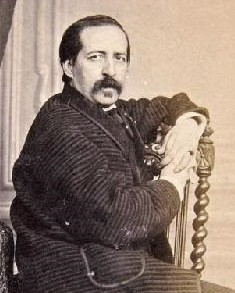
Germán Hernández Amores; photograph by Jean Laurent (c. 1863)

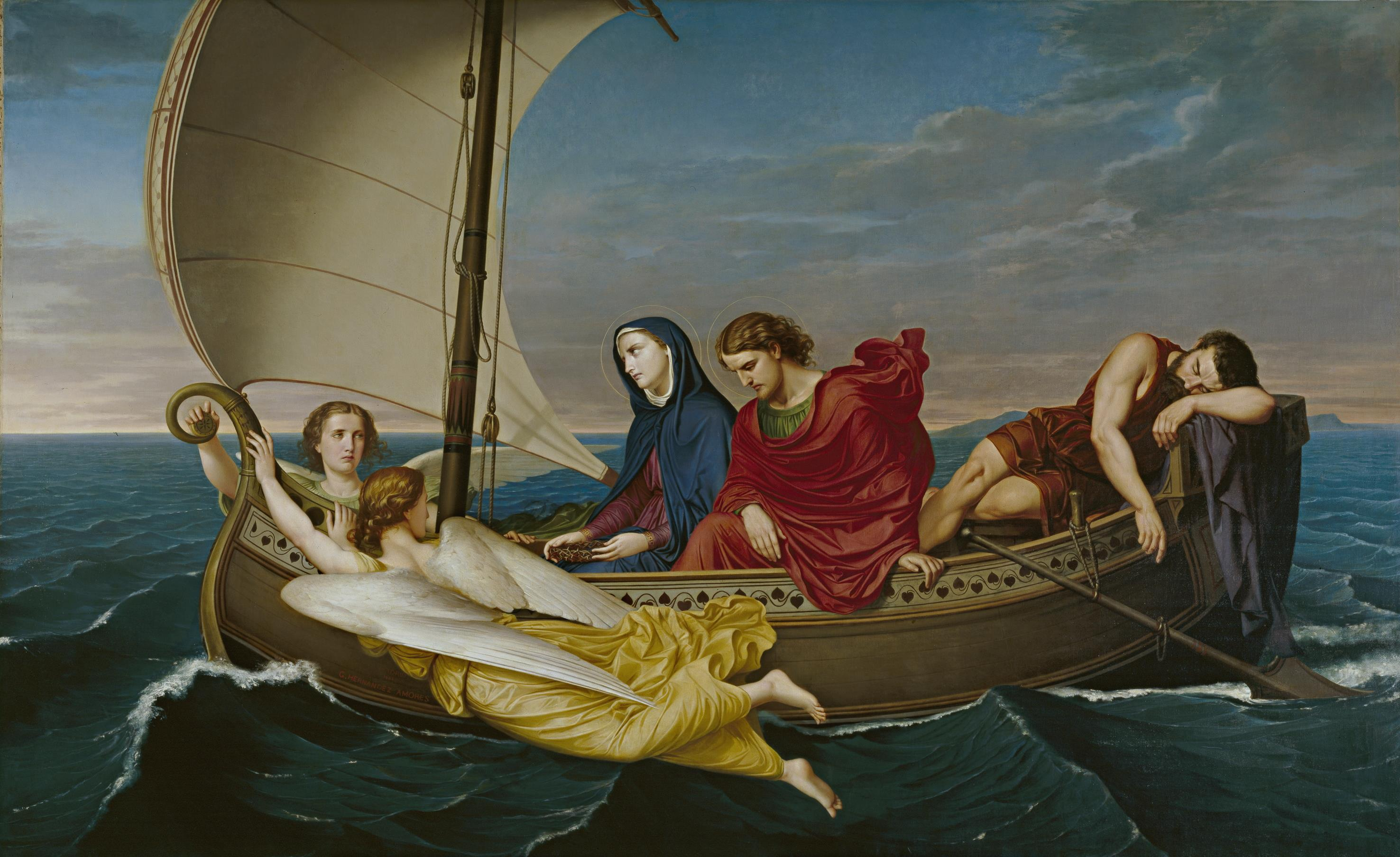
Journey of the Virgin and Saint John to Ephesus

Germán Hernández Amores (10 June 1823 – 16 May 1894) was a Spanish painter who specialized in Classical, mythological, and Biblical scenes. He was one of the few artists in Spain to adopt stylistic elements from the German Nazarene movement.

== Biography ==
He was born in Murcia. He began by studying drawing with the Italian-born sculptor Santiago Baglietto (1781–1853) at the Sociedad Económica de los Amigos del País in Murcia. Then, he studied at the Real Academia de Bellas Artes de San Fernando, with José and Federico de Madrazo. During this time, he paid his way by doing book illustrations.

The year 1851 found him in Paris, on a scholarship from the Consejo y Comisaría de Cruzada, obtained through the influence of Luis González Bravo. There, he studied with Charles Gleyre. Two years later, he received a pension that allowed him to stay at the Spanish Academy in Rome. He was there until 1857 and made contact with several German painters of the Nazarene movement, which influenced his style.

In 1858, he was awarded a Second Class prize at the National Exhibition of Fine Arts for his painting of Socrates reprimanding Alcibiades. His depiction of the Virgin Mary and Saint John on their way to Ephesus received a First Class prize at the Exhibition of 1862. He would continue to participate until 1892, but won no further prizes.

Later, he became a professor at the Escuela Superior de Pintura and, in 1892, was named a member of the Real Academia. He died in 1894 in Murcia.

His younger brother, Víctor Hernández Amores, was also a well-known painter.

== Sources ==
- Biography @ the Museo del Prado
- Biography @ MCN Biografías
- Diccionario de Arte, Pintores del siglo XIX, Editorial LIBSA, 2001. ISBN 84-7630-842-6.
