= Los Santos de la Humosa =

- Municipality
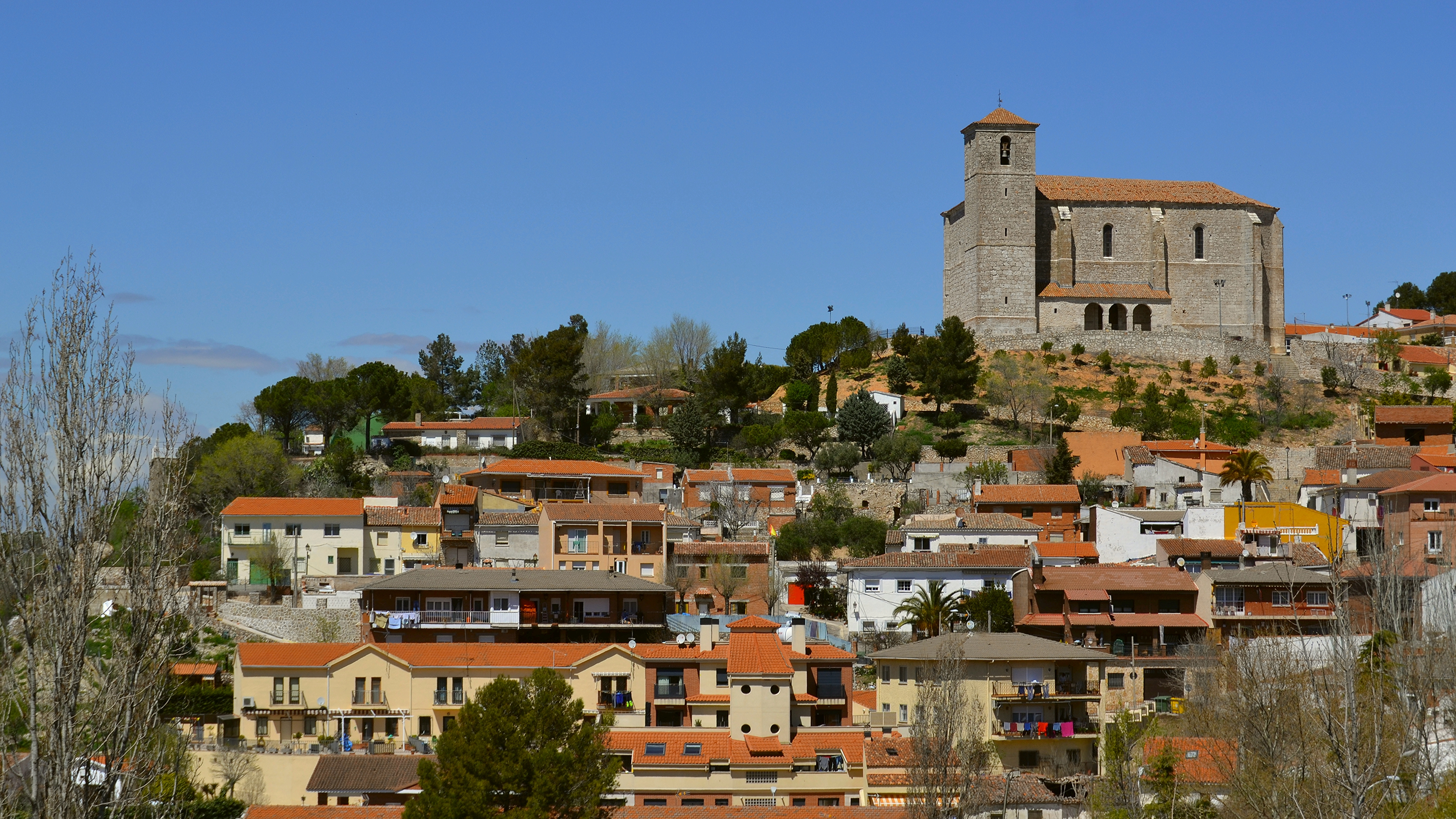

- Flag Coat of arms

- Municipal location within the Community of Madrid.

- Location in Spain
- Coordinates: 40°30′6″N 3°15′22″W
- Country: Spain
- Autonomous community: Community of Madrid

Area
  - Total: 13.5 sq mi (34.9 km^{2})
- Elevation: 2,992 ft (912 m)

Population (2025-01-01)
  - Total: 2,867
- Time zone: UTC+1 (CET)
  - Summer (DST): UTC+2 (CEST)

Los Santos de la Humosa (Spanish: [los ˈsantos ðe la uˈmosa]) is a municipality of the Community of Madrid, Spain.
