= Daganzo de Arriba =

- Municipality
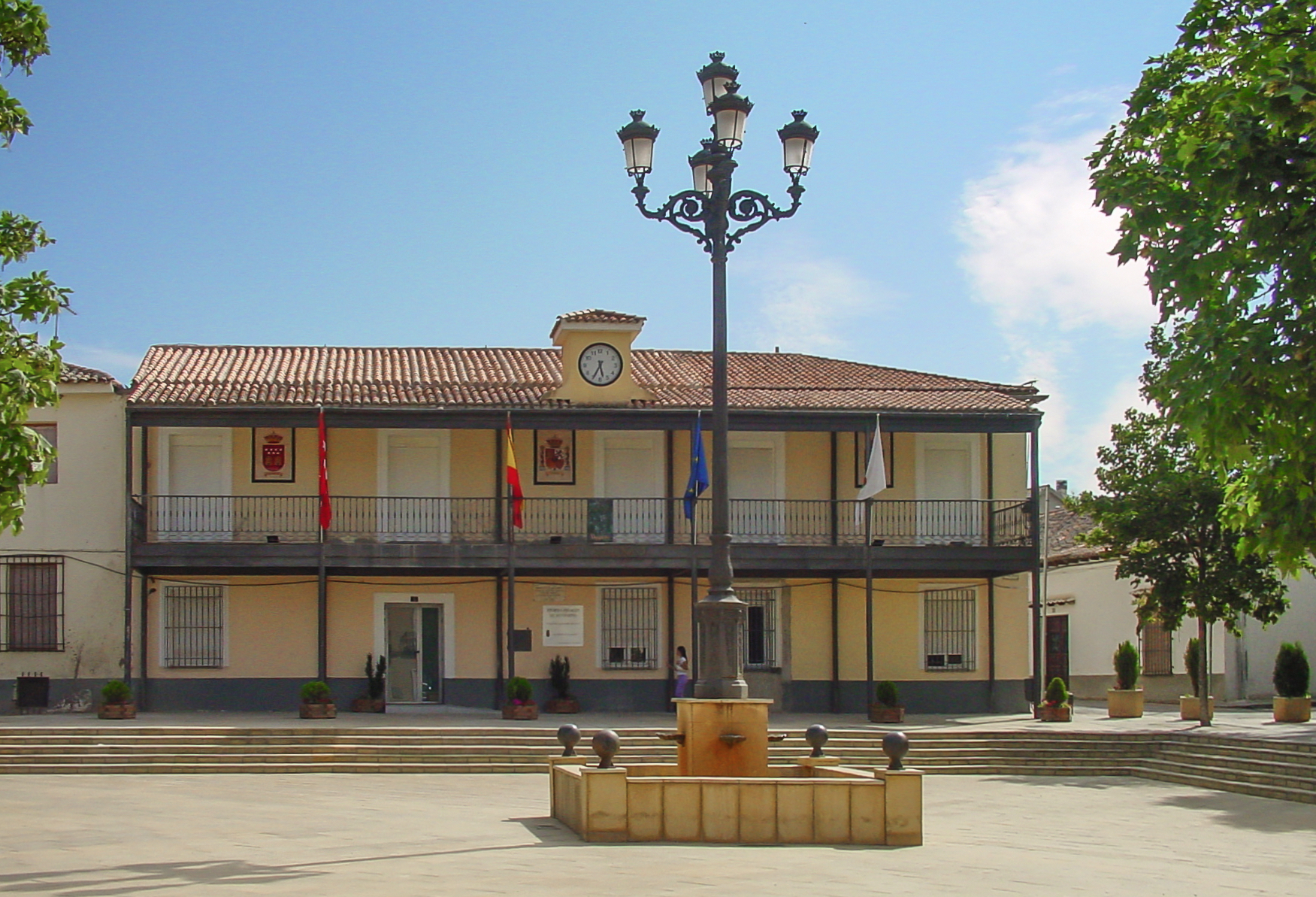
- Town hall

- Flag Coat of arms

- Location of Daganzo de Arriba in Madrid

- Location in Spain
- Coordinates: 40°32′36″N 3°27′26″W
- Country: Spain
- Autonomous community: Madrid
- Province: Madrid
- Comarca: Comarca de Alcalá
- Judicial district: Torrejón de Ardoz

Government
  - Alcalde: Sergio Berzal (2011) (Partido Popular)

Area
  - Total: 43.8 km^{2} (16.9 sq mi)
- Elevation: 673 m (2,208 ft)

Population (2025-01-01)
  - Total: 10,764
  - Density: 246/km^{2} (636/sq mi)
- Demonym: Daganceño
- Time zone: UTC+1 (CET)
  - Summer (DST): UTC+2 (CEST)
- Postal code: 28814
- Official language(s): Spanish
- Website: Official website

Daganzo de Arriba (Spanish: [daˈɣanθo ðe aˈriβa]) is a Spanish municipality in the Comarca de Alcalá, located in the north-east of Autonomous Community of Madrid. It has a population of about 9,000 (including the residents of the permanent camping that is in the town), of which are mostly young families, in more recent times people have been purchasing homes in the new housing subdivisions that are being built and residing within those new neighborhoods.

It is 27 km to the east-northeast of Madrid and 11 km to the north of Alcalá de Henares. It has an altitude of 673 meters above sea level and has a municipal area of 4,325 hectares.

The village is surrounded by small hills. From north to south, the river Torote runs through the village, in whose margins was located the first settlement of this town, in the same place where the church of Nuestra Señora del Espino is, and stream Valseco.

There are two industrial parks which collectively employ about 1,800 workers, of which 800 are residents of the town. The rest come from other nearby municipalities. It has an important agriculture according to the area of the municipality, which is quite extensive and of acceptable quality.

The climate that dominates the area is characterized by very high summer temperatures and low winter temperatures. Rainfall in summer is almost zero and medium in periods of autumn and winter, therefore is unevenly distributed throughout the year. The average annual temperature is 14.5 °C with temperatures ranging from 27 °C in summer to 5 °C in winter.
