= Pezuela de las Torres =

Pezuela de las Torres Pezuela de las Torres Puksula
- Municipality
- Coat of arms

- Municipal location within the Community of Madrid.
- Coordinates: 40°25′10″N 3°10′43″W
- Country: Spain
- Autonomous community: Community of Madrid
- Provinces: Province of Madrid
- Region: Alcarria
- Established: Middle Ages

Government
  - Mayor: José Pío Carmena Servert (AIP - Agrupación Independiente de Pezuela)

Area
  - Land: 1,600 sq mi (4,144 km^{2})
- Elevation: 3,000 ft (900 m)

Population (2025-01-01)
  - Total: 1,008
  - Density: 5,100/sq mi (1,969/km^{2})
- Demonym: Galop(s) Galopo/a
- Time zone: UTC+1 (CET)
  - Summer (DST): UTC+2 (CEST)
- Postal code: 28812
- Website: pezueladelastorres.es

Pezuela de las Torres is a municipality located in the Community of Madrid, Spain. Closely related to Guadalajara, this Alcarrian village maintains a unique spirit of country labour and tradition.

== Tourism ==
Pezuela de las Torres main attraction is its natural landscape. The closeness to the Tajuña river makes this municipality unique regarding natural ecosystems. Several picnic areas are built all along the village. Another important sight is the Jesus' Birth Theatre. This performance is played out on the streets of the town, taking advantage of the oldest buildings' façades and the beauty of its historic centre. Besides this, Pezuela de las Torres has other important attractions: its natural fountains, country pathways, etc.

== Public Transport ==
Pezuela is covered by the Regional Consortium of Transportation for Madrid, enabling the communication by bus with Alcalá de Henares, the largest city in Eastern Madrid as well as the transport hub for this area. Altogether, Pezuela possesses two different bus lines operated by Castromil S.A.U.:

271 Line: Alcalá de Henares-Pezuela-Pioz 272 Line: Alcalá de Henares-Villalbilla*

Notwithstanding, the local youngsters complain about the lack of buses in some time zones, likewise the lack of sense in the distribution of the schedule.

== Government ==
This town has a special political situation. Pezuela de las Torres has the next composition in its council:

- AIP (Agrupación Independiente de Pezuela) 2 councilor

- PP (Partido Popular-People's Party) 2councilors.

- IU (Izquierda Unida- United Left) 3 councilors.

== Festivities ==
Relevant festivals in Pezuela de las Torres are:

- Saint Anna's Day: with a traditional gathering in the homonym park and a mass takes place as well as a traditional market.

- Town's Festival: it is the greatest festival in the town and is the most popular festivity. Every 14 September during days the village fills up with people from different places and surrounding towns.

- Saint Benito's Day: people go to the parish, at the town's border, and once there, people hear mass, enjoy chocolate and buy in a traditional market.

- Saint Isidro's Day: The farmer's patron. On his day, country workers pray the Saint for good crops and a generous harvest in a procession through the village.

- Virgin Pilar's Day: also known as Spanish National Day (12 October) consists of a 3-day festival enlivened with on live performances, processions, and masses.

The town doubles its population size thanks to the visitors who come to town to visit their friends and relatives. The proximity to Madrid makes that most of those people come from the capital and the near city of Alcalá de Henares.

== Demography ==
There have been many unusual changes in the census. Pezuela's population had its maximum peak during the 1950–70 period, yet the advent of the new century carried a severe decline in the number of dwellers with it. Nowadays, the village keeps a regular population of over 800 inhabitants. Nonetheless, as previously described, in some festivities the town's population surges as a result of the arrival of people from Madrid and Alcalá de Henares.
