= Torres de la Alameda =

Coordinates: 40°25′N 3°22′W

- Municipality
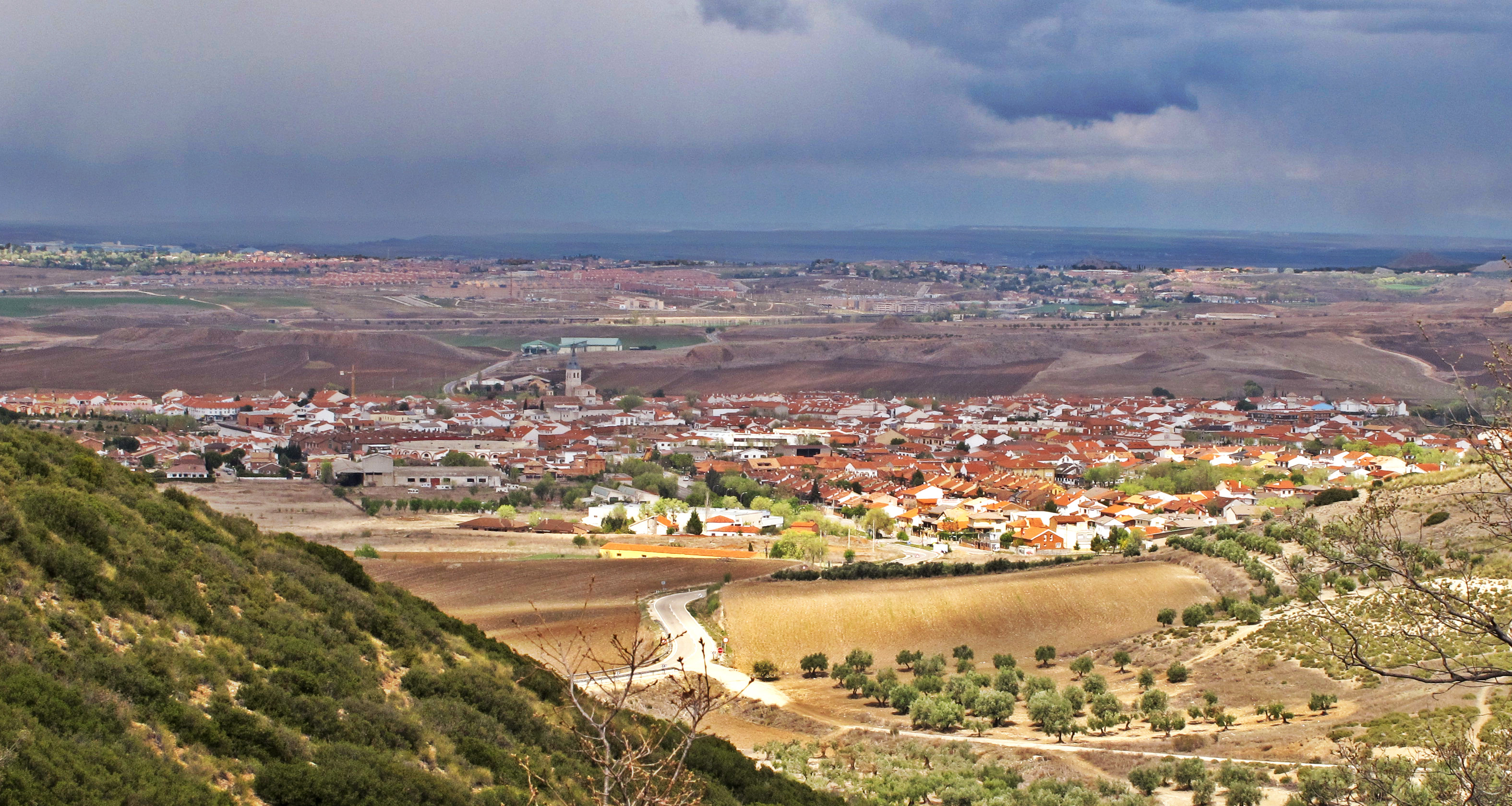

- Flag Coat of arms
- Municipal location within the Community of Madrid.
- Location in Spain
- Country: Spain
- Region: Community of Madrid
- Elevation: 2,146 ft (654 m)

Population (2025-01-01)
  - Total: 7,824
- Time zone: UTC+1 (CET)
  - Summer (DST): UTC+2 (CEST)

Torres de la Alameda (Spanish pronunciation: [ˈtores ðe la alaˈmeða]) is a municipality of the Community of Madrid, Spain.
