= Belmonte de Tajo =

Coordinates: 40°08′N 3°20′W

- Municipality
- Flag Coat of arms

- Municipal location within the Community of Madrid.
- Country: Spain
- Autonomous community: Community of Madrid

Area
  - Total: 9.2 sq mi (23.7 km^{2})

Population (2025-01-01)
  - Total: 1,955
- Time zone: UTC+1 (CET)
  - Summer (DST): UTC+2 (CEST)

Belmonte de Tajo (Spanish pronunciation: [belˈmonte ðe ˈtaxo]) is a municipality of the autonomous community of Madrid in central Spain. It belongs to the comarca of Las Vegas.
