= Orusco de Tajuña =

- Municipality
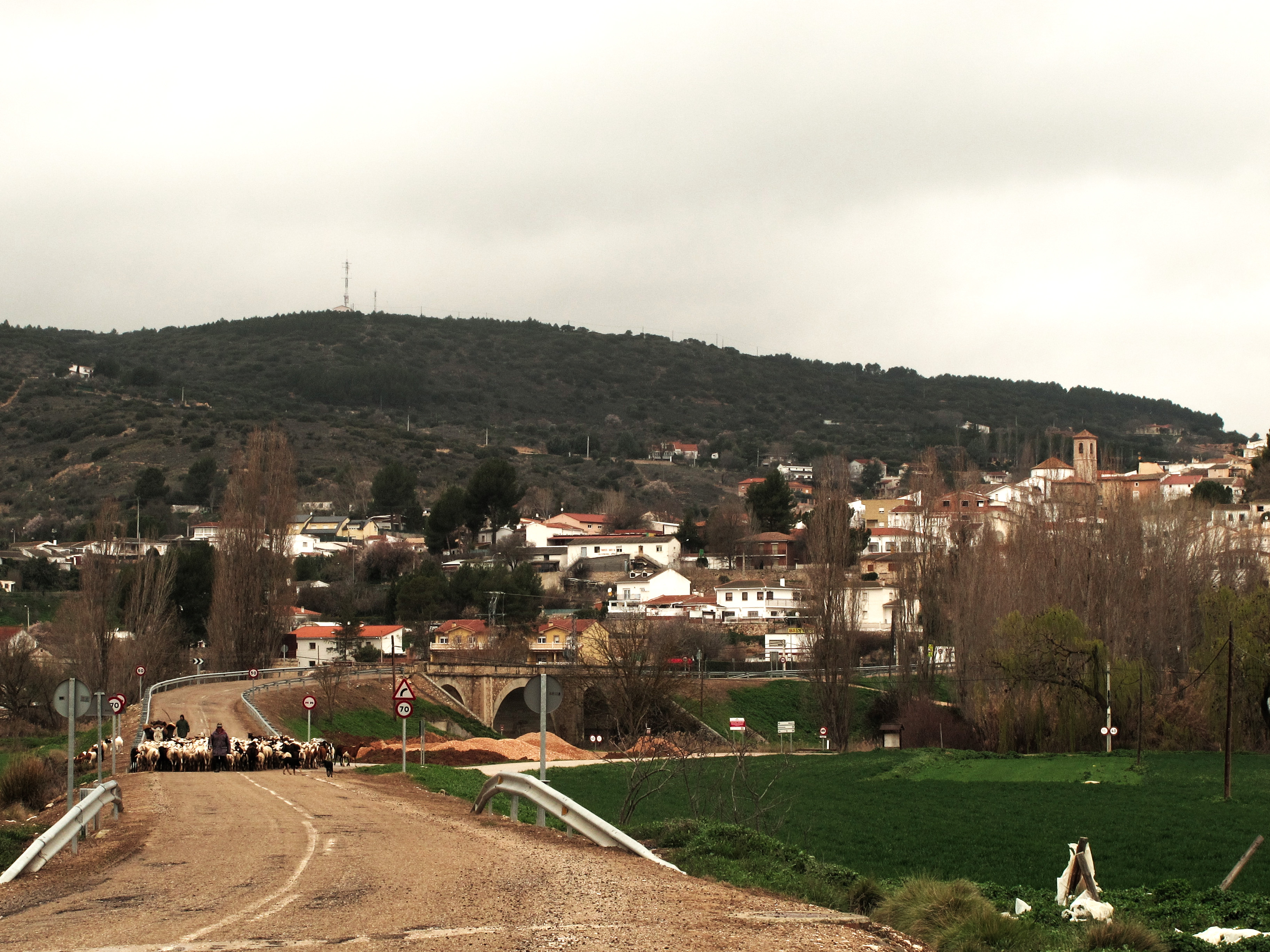

- Flag Coat of arms

- Municipal location within the Community of Madrid.
- Coordinates: 40.2833°N 3.2166°W
- Country: Spain
- Autonomous community: Community of Madrid

Population (2025-01-01)
  - Total: 1,531
- Time zone: UTC+1 (CET)
  - Summer (DST): UTC+2 (CEST)

Orusco de Tajuña is a municipality of the Community of Madrid, Spain.
