= Ambite =

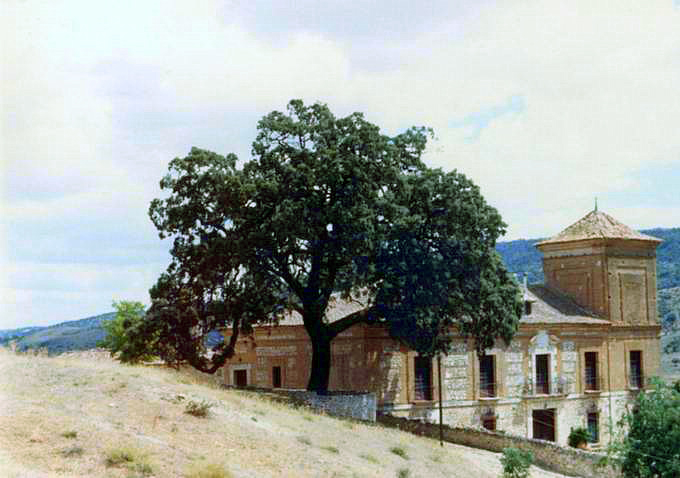
- Oak outside the palacio in Ambite

- Flag Coat of arms

- Coordinates: 40°19′40″N 3°10′59″W
- Country: Spain
- Province: Madrid

Area
  - Total: 26 km^{2} (10 sq mi)
- Elevation: 770 m (2,530 ft)

Population (2025-01-01)
  - Total: 732
  - Density: 28/km^{2} (73/sq mi)
- Demonym: ambiteño/ambiteña

Ambite (Spanish pronunciation: [amˈbite]) is a municipality in the province of Madrid in central Spain. It belongs to the comarca of Alcalá. It has 648 inhabitants (INE 2022) in an area of 26 square kilometres (10 mi^{2}), with a population density of 14.69 hab/km^{2}. It lies 770 metres (2,530 ft) above sea level.

Ambite is home to the Palacio del Marqués de Legarda, which dates to the 17th century. It was built by Alonso de Terante y Cárdenas, the Spanish ambassador in Naples during the reign of King Felipe III.

== Transport ==
The town of Ambite is serviced by three major bus lines

- 260: Alcalá de Henares-Ambite-Orusco.
- 322: Arganda del Rey-Ambite.
- 326: Madrid (Conde de Casal)-Mondejar-Driebes.

== Politics ==
Party	Votes	%	+/-	Seats	+/-
Somos Ambite	232	54.58	New	4	New
PP	145	34.11	▲12.9	3	▲1
PSOE	30	7.05	▲4.32	0	0
Vox	11	2.58	New	0	New
Somos Ambite gain from no overall control					

== Sites of interest ==
- Church of Our Lady of the Assumption
- Palace of Marqués de Legarda
- Monument of the Eyes
- Historical oak tree
