= Villar del Olmo =

Coordinates: 40°20′N 3°14′W

- Municipality
- Flag Coat of arms

- Municipal location within the Community of Madrid.
- Country: Spain
- Autonomous community: Community of Madrid

Area
  - Total: 11 sq mi (28 km^{2})
- Elevation: 2,215 ft (675 m)

Population (2025-01-01)
  - Total: 2,341
  - Density: 220/sq mi (84/km^{2})
- Time zone: UTC+1 (CET)
  - Summer (DST): UTC+2 (CEST)

Villar del Olmo is a municipality of the Community of Madrid, Spain. It is a town located east of the Community of Madrid, in the District of Las Vegas (although it is considered part of the Comarca de Alcalá). Its population is 2219 inhabitants (INE - 2022) and has an area of 28 km ². Per capita income data for 2003 is 8452 € / person.

== Holidays ==
- 5 February: St. Agatha.
- 15 May: San Isidro (patron).
- 15 September : Our Lady of Solitude (fiestas).

== Access ==
From Madrid to the village can be reached by the A-3, exit 22 direction of Campo Real, or by the A-2 M-50 exit towards Valencia and the exit primaera Torrejón de Ardoz on the M-206. Continue direction Loeches, Pozuelo del Rey and New Baztán direction where there are already signs Villar del Olmo.

== Education ==
There is one kindergarten (public).
