= Cobeña =

- Municipality
- Flag Coat of arms

- Location of Cobeña in Madrid

- Location in Spain
- Coordinates: 40°34′1″N 3°30′25″W
- Country: Spain
- Community: Community of Madrid
- Province: Madrid
- Comarca: Cuenca del Medio Jarama

Government
  - Mayor: Eugenio González Moya

Area
  - Total: 20.8 km^{2} (8.0 sq mi)
- Elevation: 675 m (2,215 ft)

Population (2025-01-01)
  - Total: 7,670
  - Density: 369/km^{2} (955/sq mi)
- Demonym: Cobeñenses
- Time zone: UTC+1 (CET)
  - Summer (DST): UTC+2 (CEST)
- Website: Official website

Cobeña is a town and municipality in the autonomous community of Madrid in central Spain, located approximately 27 km north-east of Madrid. It belongs to the comarca of Alcalá. Cobeña is set between three hills, surrounded by vast kilometres of crop fields. The ground is made of layers of clay and sand, which allow water to flow in subterranean rivers to join the Jarama river. The nearest town is Algete, just 3 km away.

Sights include the church of San Cipriano.

== Sources ==
- Official website
