= Tielmes =

Coordinates: 40°14′N 3°19′W

- Municipality
- Flag Coat of arms

- Municipal location within the Community of Madrid.
- Country: Spain
- Autonomous community: Community of Madrid

Population (2025-01-01)
  - Total: 2,964
- Time zone: UTC+1 (CET)
  - Summer (DST): UTC+2 (CEST)

Tielmes is a municipality of the Community of Madrid, Spain. In 2022 it had a population of 2,783.
