= Valdilecha =

Municipality of Spain

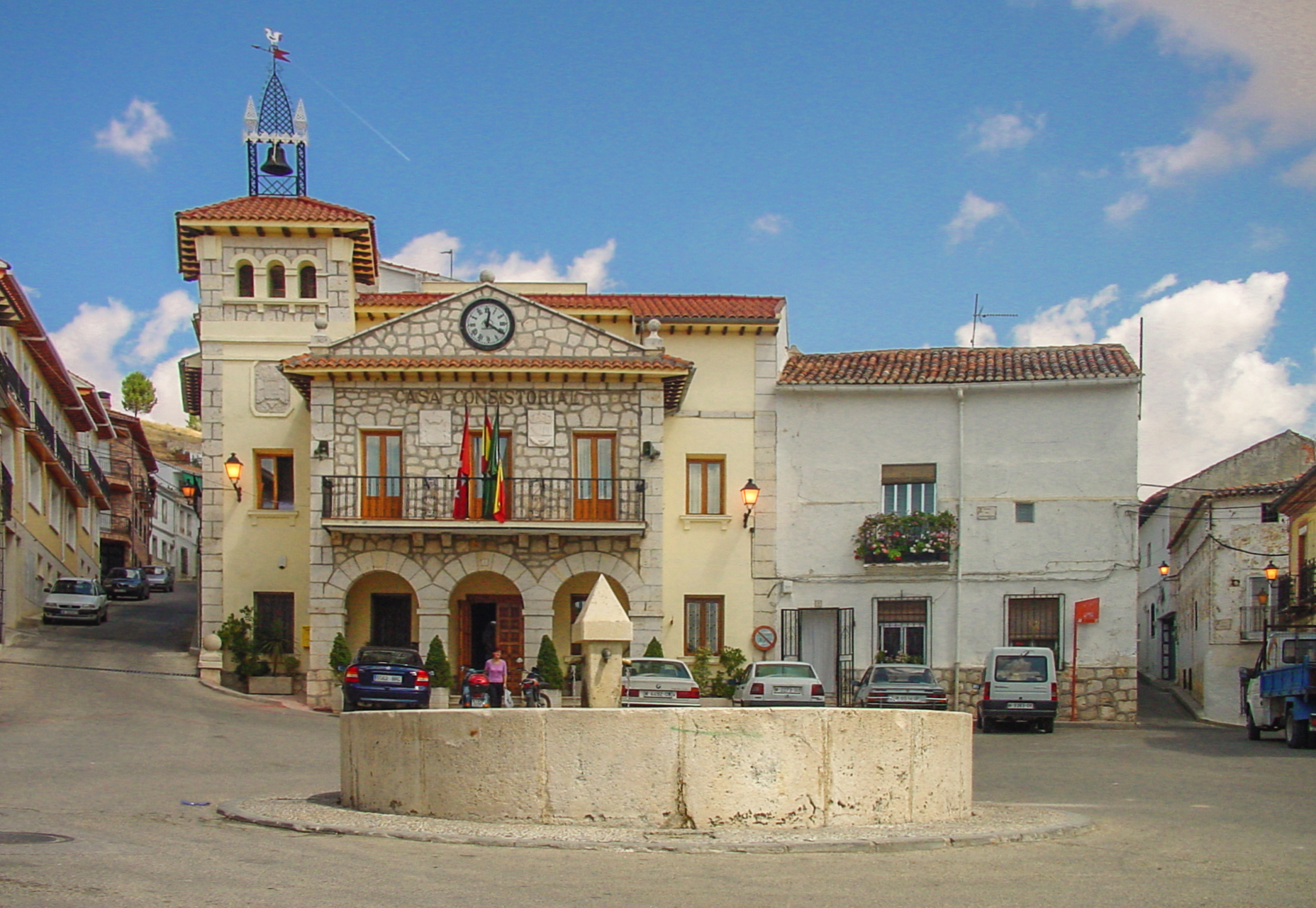

- Flag Coat of arms

- Location within Spain
- Country: Spain

Population (2025-01-01)
  - Total: 3,289
- Time zone: UTC+1 (CET)
  - Summer (DST): UTC+2 (CEST)
- Website: www.valdilecha.org

Valdilecha is a small rural town on the outskirts of the region of Madrid, Spain, east-southeast of the town of Arganda del Rey. In 2022 it had a population of 3104.
