= Villaconejos =

Coordinates: 40°11′00″N 3°48′00″W

- Municipality
- Flag Coat of arms

- Municipal location within the Community of Madrid.
- Country: Spain
- Autonomous community: Community of Madrid

Area
  - Total: 14.15 sq mi (36.65 km^{2})
- Elevation: 2,230 ft (680 m)

Population (2025-01-01)
  - Total: 3,569
  - Density: 252.2/sq mi (97.38/km^{2})
- Time zone: UTC+1 (CET)
  - Summer (DST): UTC+2 (CEST)

Villaconejos is a municipality of the Community of Madrid, Spain. Historically, Villaconejos's economy has been based on agriculture. Examples of the region's common crops include olives, cereals, and fruits, including melons. The melons of Villaconejos are popular throughout Spain. Villaconejos is home to a Melon Museum.

== Etymology ==
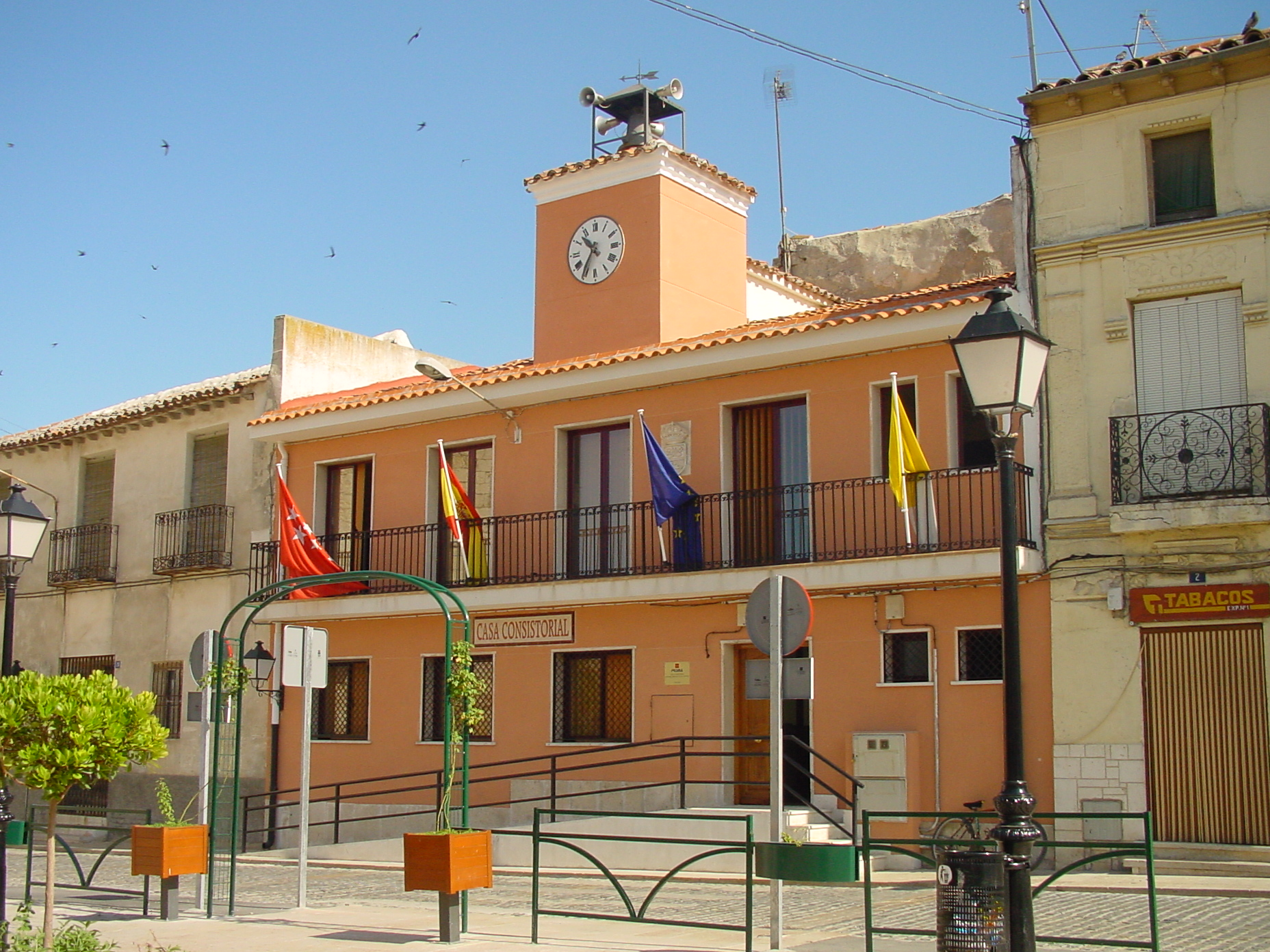
The Ayuntamiento

The town's name comes from Conejos which literally means 'rabbits' in Spanish. The general belief is that the name stemmed from the historical abundance of rabbits in the region, and the hunters attracted to the region by said rabbits.

== History ==
The history of Villaconejos may be traced to the place known as 'El Vedado' ("The Reserve"), and a small hill known as 'Cerro Barbero' (formerly called 'Cerro Galguera'). These names are closely related to 'hunting,' 'the closed area' and 'hunting dogs.' Hunting took place near Villaconejos until the late 16th Century, when deforestation reduced the rabbit population.

The historical abundance of rabbits and the reputation of melons in the area have long been recorded in historical writings. There were so many rabbits in the area that wolves began frequenting the area, occasionally attacking persons in the local village.

In 1561, significant deforestation occurred within the area known as El Montecillo. There were numerous oak, pine, and gall trees that made the area dense in vegetation until the wolf problem arose. The local residents took it upon themselves to deforest the area.

Before the deforestation, the rabbits tended to forage on the local farms to survive. The rabbits lived in the vicinity of villages and towns, making their homes in the nearby forests. As a result of the large rabbit populations, wolves were able to thrive, and their numbers rose exponentially. It was in response to the wolf problem that the people of the municipality heavily deforested nearby areas. The result was a reduction in the wolf population, but the rabbit population also decreased dramatically.

Over time, the hunters who had come to the area, attracted by the local rabbit population, became less enamored of the area, leading to the collapse of the hunting association and reducing economic growth in the community.
