= List of municipalities in the Community of Madrid =

The municipalities in the Community of Madrid

This is a list of the 179 municipalities of the province and autonomous community of Madrid in Spain.

Name	Population (2024)	Area (km^{2})	Density	Mayor			
Name	Population (2024)	Area (km^{2})	Density	Name		Party	Since
Ajalvir	4,946	19.62	243.6		Víctor Malo	Localist	2019
Alameda del Valle	256	25.01	11.0		María Elizabeth Crespo	Spanish Socialist Workers' Party	2023
Alcalá de Henares	199,804	87.72	2,270.6		Judith Piquet	People's Party	2023
Alcobendas	121,446	44.98	2,654.8		Rocío Sara García	People's Party	2023
Alcorcón	174,740	33.73	5,092.2		Candelaria Testa	Spanish Socialist Workers' Party	2023
Aldea del Fresno	3,422	51.78	65.8		Alberto Plaza	Localist	2023
Algete	21,134	37.88	554.1		Fernando Romo	People's Party	2023
Alpedrete	15,655	12.64	1,211.6		Juan Rodríguez Fernández	People's Party	2019
Ambite	701	26.00	26.3		Apolonio Alcaide	Localist	2019
Anchuelo	1,393	21.55	64.0		Javier Doncel	People's Party	2019
Aranjuez	62,508	201.11	301.7		María José Martínez	People's Party	2019
Arganda del Rey	59,209	79.65	740.6		Alberto Escribano	People's Party	2023
Arroyomolinos	37,299	20.66	1,741.3		Luis Quiroga	People's Party	2023
Batres	1,957	21.37	87.6		Juan Carlos Alañon	Localist	2023
Becerril de la Sierra	6,553	30.35	206.8		Jose Luis Martín	People's Party	2023
Belmonte de Tajo	1,919	23.71	77.6		Roberto Morate	People's Party	2023
Berzosa del Lozoya	234	14.32	15.2		Antonio del Pozo	People's Party	1991
Boadilla del Monte	65,528	47.20	1,371.8		Javier Úbeda	People's Party	2019
Braojos	219	24.93	8.5		Ricardo Jose Moreno	People's Party	2019
Brea de Tajo	567	44.33	12.2		Rafael Barcala	People's Party	2019
Brunete	11,263	48.94	225.0		María del Pilar Nicolás	People's Party	2023
Buitrago del Lozoya	1,970	26.50	74.2		Francisco Javier del Valle	People's Party	2023
Bustarviejo	2,833	57.32	47.9		Tanausu Luis Perera	People's Party	2023
Cabanillas de la Sierra	949	14.07	66.7		Fernando Tarraga	Localist	2023
Cadalso de los Vidrios	3,274	47.64	66.6		Verónica Muñoz	People's Party	2011
Camarma de Esteruelas	8,107	35.43	219.9		Ana Victoria Cruz	People's Party	2023
Campo Real	6,766	61.75	109.8		Francisco Leal	People's Party	2023
Canencia	468	52.70	8.7		María Mercedes López	People's Party	2019
Carabaña	2,375	47.58	47.8		Mario Terrón	People's Party	2019
Casarrubuelos	4,225	5.32	763.3		Vicente Astillero	Más Madrid	2019
Cenicientos	2,141	67.49	31.1		Jerónimo López	People's Party	2023
Cercedilla	7,646	35.78	213.8		David José Martín	Localist	2023
Cervera de Buitrago	161	12.02	13.6		Isidro Parra	Spanish Socialist Workers' Party	2015
Chapinería	2,634	25.40	102.5		Lucía Moya	Localist	2019
Chinchón	5,820	115.91	48.9		Juan Antonio Vega	Localist	2023
Ciempozuelos	26,046	49.64	521.1		Raquel Jimeno	Spanish Socialist Workers' Party	2019
Cobeña	7,742	20.84	369.4		Jorge Amatos	People's Party	2011
Collado Mediano	7,564	22.57	331.8		María de la Sierra Serrano	Localist	2023
Collado Villalba	67,323	26.52	2,475.7		Mariola Vargas	People's Party	2014
Colmenar de Oreja	8,982	114.32	75.7		Miguel Ángel Pulido	People's Party	2023
Colmenar del Arroyo	2,013	50.57	38.5		Ana Belén Barbero	People's Party	2010
Colmenar Viejo	56,878	182.56	302.3		Carlos Blázquez	People's Party	2023
Colmenarejo	9,741	31.70	300.8		Fernando Juanas	People's Party	2023
Corpa	795	25.91	30.8		Santiago Serrano	United Left	2019
Coslada	80,688	12.01	6,673.0		Ángel Viveros	Spanish Socialist Workers' Party	2015
Cubas de la Sagra	6,984	12.82	531.6		Antonio Naranjo	People's Party	2019
Daganzo de Arriba	10,673	43.77	242.4		Manuel Jurado	People's Party	2019
El Álamo	10,413	22.25	463.9		Alberto Cabezas	People's Party	2023
El Atazar	107	29.55	3.5		Daniel Lozano	People's Party	2023
El Berrueco	828	28.80	27.9		Jaime Sanz	People's Party	2019
El Boalo	8,548	39.59	212.8		Sergio Sánchez	People's Party	2023
El Escorial	17,262	68.75	245.4		Antonio Vicente Rubio	People's Party	2019
El Molar	10,079	50.29	194.1		Borja Díaz	People's Party	2023
El Vellón	2,160	34.14	64.4		Catalina Llorente	Spanish Socialist Workers' Party	2019
Estremera	1,451	79.10	18.4		María Teresa Ocaña	Spanish Socialist Workers' Party	2023
Fresnedillas de la Oliva	1,833	28.20	63.5		José Damián de la Peña	Localist	2019
Fresno de Torote	2,547	31.59	79.8		Ana Isabel Arias	People's Party	2023
Fuenlabrada	190,496	39.41	4,789.0		Javier Ayala	Spanish Socialist Workers' Party	2018
Fuente el Saz de Jarama	7,384	33.23	216.2		María José Moñino	People's Party	2019
Fuentidueña de Tajo	2,319	60.59	37.5		José Antonio Domínguez	Spanish Socialist Workers' Party	2015
Galapagar	36,112	64.99	542.7		Carla Greciano	People's Party	2023
Garganta de los Montes	415	39.66	10.6		Rafael Pastor	Localist	2023
Gargantilla del Lozoya y Pinilla de Buitrago	401	24.12	16.1		Rafael García	People's Party	2019
Gascones	236	20.04	11.4		Jesús Romero	People's Party	2023
Getafe	191,560	78.38	2,371.8		Sara Hernández	Spanish Socialist Workers' Party	2019
Griñón	10,714	17.42	579.0		Jose María Porras	People's Party	2019
Guadalix de la Sierra	6,912	61.05	111.6		Borja Álvarez	Spanish Socialist Workers' Party	2019
Guadarrama	17,069	56.98	299.5		Diosdado Soto	People's Party	2019
Horcajo de la Sierra	231	20.57	11.4		Antonella Melano	People's Party	2023
Horcajuelo de la Sierra	111	24.39	4.4		Arancha Álvarez	People's Party	2023
Hoyo de Manzanares	9,186	45.31	198.0		María Victoria Barderas	People's Party	2023
Humanes de Madrid	20,054	19.46	1,022.5		Jose Antonio Sánchez	People's Party	2019
La Acebeda	68	22.06	3.0		Gustavo Martín	Localist	2023
La Cabrera	2,952	22.40	128.6		Ismael de la Fuente	People's Party	2023
La Hiruela	84	17.18	4.3		Antonio Biedma	Localist	2023
La Serna del Monte	105	5.44	19.5		Mónica Gutiérrez	People's Party	2023
Las Rozas de Madrid	99,193	58.31	1,682.2		José de la Uz	People's Party	2015
Leganés	193,934	43.09	4,424.6		Miguel Ángel Recuenco	People's Party	2023
Loeches	9,253	44.06	206.7		Antonio Theodori	People's Party	2023
Los Molinos	4,812	19.56	244.7		Antonio Coello	People's Party	2019
Los Santos de la Humosa	2,797	34.89	79.5		Lázaro Polo	People's Party	2019
Lozoya	620	57.94	10.7		Carlos Ruiz	People's Party	2019
Lozoyuela-Navas-Sieteiglesias	1,479	51.28	28.9		Francisco Aunión	Spanish Socialist Workers' Party	2023
Madarcos	70	8.46	8.5		Eva María Gallego	People's Party	2019
Madrid	3,422,416	605.77	5,500.5		José Luis Martínez-Almeida	People's Party	2019
Majadahonda	73,547	38.47	1,885.8		María Dolores Moreno	People's Party	2023
Manzanares el Real	9,539	126.70	74.1		José Luis Labrador	Spanish Socialist Workers' Party	2019
Meco	15,812	35.11	438.7		Pedro Luis Sanz	People's Party	2019
Mejorada del Campo	24,632	17.21	1,410.3		Jorge Capa	Spanish Socialist Workers' Party	2019
Miraflores de la Sierra	7,209	56.66	122.6		Luis Guadalix	People's Party	2019
Montejo de la Sierra	374	31.95	11.9		Ismael Martin	People's Party	2015
Moraleja de Enmedio	5,630	31.29	174.2		Arantxa Alonso	People's Party	2023
Moralzarzal	14,504	42.56	331.9		José María Moreno	People's Party	2023
Morata de Tajuña	8,294	45.20	179.5		Fernando Villalaín	People's Party	2023
Móstoles	213,268	45.36	4,657.5		Manuel Bautista	People's Party	2023
Navacerrada	3,307	27.29	120.3		Pablo Luis Jorge	People's Party	2023
Navalafuente	1,703	11.75	139.3		Eugenio Alcalá	People's Party	2023
Navalagamella	3,119	76.05	39.2		Andrés Samperio	People's Party	2019
Navalcarnero	32,684	100.22	319.0		José Luis Adell	Spanish Socialist Workers' Party	2015
Navarredonda y San Mamés	154	27.44	5.5		José María Fernández	Localist	2019
Navas del Rey	3,344	50.78	63.9		Jaime Peral	Localist	2007
Nuevo Baztán	7,393	20.20	349.1		Gema Pacheco	Spanish Socialist Workers' Party	2019
Olmeda de las Fuentes	409	16.57	24.3		María Victoria Roldán	Localist	2023
Orusco de Tajuña	1,504	21.51	65.8		Vanesa Gracia	Spanish Socialist Workers' Party	2023
Paracuellos de Jarama	27,241	43.92	614.7		Jesús Muñoz	People's Party	2023
Parla	134,876	24.51	5,427.0		Ramón Jurado	Spanish Socialist Workers' Party	2019
Patones	604	34.47	16.4		Luis Arriazu	Spanish Socialist Workers' Party	2023
Pedrezuela	6,475	28.35	225.8		Rodrigo García	People's Party	2023
Pelayos de la Presa	3,106	7.58	393.2		Antonio Sin	People's Party	2019
Perales de Tajuña	3,195	48.92	64.9		Yolanda Cuenca	People's Party	2019
Pezuela de las Torres	990	41.44	23.6		José Pío Carmena	Localist	2019
Pinilla del Valle	199	25.84	7.9		María del Mar Fernández	Spanish Socialist Workers' Party	2019
Pinto	55,989	62.04	889.8		Salomón Aguado	People's Party	2023
Piñuécar-Gandullas	185	18.19	9.8		Juan José Suárez	People's Party	2019
Pozuelo de Alarcón	89,123	43.20	2,055.2		Paloma Tejero	People's Party	2023
Pozuelo del Rey	1,302	31.00	40.5		Ruth Alcocer	People's Party	2021
Prádena del Rincón	139	22.48	6.7		María Sonia García	People's Party	2023
Puebla de la Sierra	93	57.70	1.7		Pedro Bautista Sánchez	Localist	2023
Puentes Viejas	774	58.33	13.0		José María Martín	Localist	2023
Quijorna	3,987	25.71	150.2		Juan Carlos Pérez	People's Party	2019
Rascafría	1,712	150.28	11.6		Óscar Joaquín Robles	Vox	2023
Redueña	292	12.87	23.6		María de la Mercedes Pérez	People's Party	2011
Ribatejada	911	31.82	28.7		Agustín Peña	People's Party	2023
Rivas-Vaciamadrid	101,637	67.38	1,488.3		Aída Castillejo	United Left-Más Madrid-Equo	2022
Robledillo de la Jara	132	20.35	6.6		Guillermo Crescente García	People's Party	2019
Robledo de Chavela	4,763	93.01	50.6		Fernando Casado	Independent	2015
Robregordo	73	18.03	4.4		Marisol Herreño	Spanish Socialist Workers' Party	2023
Rozas de Puerto Real	581	30.15	19.2		Javier Vedia	People's Party	2019
San Agustín del Guadalix	13,849	38.28	356.6		Roberto Ronda	People's Party	2019
San Fernando de Henares	38,969	39.86	977.7		Javier Corpa	Spanish Socialist Workers' Party	2019
San Lorenzo de El Escorial	18,772	56.40	327.8		Carlota López	People's Party	2019
San Martín de la Vega	20,664	105.93	191.7		Rafael Martínez	Spanish Socialist Workers' Party	2015
San Martín de Valdeiglesias	9,120	115.48	78.0		Aránzazu Povedano	People's Party	2023
San Sebastián de los Reyes	94,942	58.66	1,580.8		Lucía Soledad Fernández	People's Party	2023
Santa María de la Alameda	1,516	74.41	20.4		Gloria de Castro	People's Party	2023
Santorcaz	998	27.98	33.7		Rubén Gómez	Spanish Socialist Workers' Party	2019
Serranillos del Valle	4,632	13.29	347.9		Iván Fernández	Localist	2019
Sevilla la Nueva	9,694	25.13	380.1		Asensio Martínez	People's Party	2019
Somosierra	98	20.42	4.2		Alejandro Trillo	People's Party	2023
Soto del Real	9,436	43.21	217.5		Noelia Barrado	Spanish Socialist Workers' Party	2021
Talamanca de Jarama	4,526	39.36	110.7		Juan Manuel García	Spanish Socialist Workers' Party	2015
Tielmes	2,807	26.88	102.0		Miguel Ángel Barbero	People's Party	2019
Titulcia	1,393	9.95	136.9		Francisca Suárez	Spanish Socialist Workers' Party	2019
Torrejón de Ardoz	141,047	32.62	4,221.2		Alejandro Navarro	People's Party	2023
Torrejón de la Calzada	10,366	8.98	1,138.0		David Blázquez	Localist	2023
Torrejón de Velasco	4,887	52.32	90.9		Esteban Bravo	People's Party	2019
Torrelaguna	4,992	43.40	114.0		Eduardo Burgos	Spanish Socialist Workers' Party	2019
Torrelodones	25,250	21.95	1,144.3		Almudena Negro	People's Party	2023
Torremocha de Jarama	1,134	18.49	61.9		Carlos Rivera	Independent	1979
Torres de la Alameda	7,742	43.61	177.4		José Antonio Blanco	People's Party	2023
Tres Cantos	52,825	37.93	1,356.4		Jesús Moreno	People's Party	2019
Valdaracete	653	64.31	9.8		Armando Expósito	Spanish Socialist Workers' Party	2023
Valdeavero	1,817	18.79	94.8		María Luisa de Castro	Spanish Socialist Workers' Party	2023
Valdelaguna	1,079	42.13	24.8		Pablo Morate	People's Party	2019
Valdemanco	1,065	17.58	60.6		Luis Navarro	Localist	2023
Valdemaqueda	836	52.20	15.7		Ricardo Meneses	People's Party	2023
Valdemorillo	14,139	93.68	145.7		Santiago Villena	People's Party	2019
Valdemoro	83,582	64.17	1,268.4		David Conde	People's Party	2023
Valdeolmos-Alalpardo	4,579	26.81	168.7		Miguel Ángel Medranda	People's Party	2011
Valdepiélagos	623	17.59	35.4		Pedro José Cabrera	Localist	2019
Valdetorres de Jarama	5,050	33.52	148.9		José María de Diego	Localist	2019
Valdilecha	3,228	42.48	75.1		José Javier López	People's Party	2019
Valverde de Alcalá	555	13.53	39.6		Gabino de Hago	People's Party	2019
Velilla de San Antonio	14,008	14.35	931.9		Antonia Alcázar	Spanish Socialist Workers' Party	2019
Venturada	2,577	9.79	260.8		Carolina Folgueira	Localist	2023
Villa del Prado	7,424	78.42	92.7		Belén Rodríguez	People's Party	2023
Villaconejos	3,487	32.97	106.1		Adolfo Pacheco	People's Party	2019
Villalbilla	17,967	34.46	488.1		Antonio Barahona	Localist	2015
Villamanrique de Tajo	820	29.32	27.3		Antonia Ayuso	People's Party	2015
Villamanta	2,855	63.15	43.9		Mariano Núñez	People's Party	2023
Villamantilla	1,620	23.99	65.7		Juan Antonio de la Morena	People's Party	2007
Villanueva de la Cañada	23,714	34.92	675.7		Luis Partida	People's Party	1979
Villanueva de Perales	1,718	31.18	53.6		José María Barrado	Spanish Socialist Workers' Party	2019
Villanueva del Pardillo	17,994	25.35	699.5		Eduardo Fernández Navarro	Localist	2019
Villar del Olmo	2,274	27.62	81.7		Lucila Toledo	People's Party	2019
Villarejo de Salvanés	7,887	118.62	65.3		Jesús Díaz	Localist	2023
Villaviciosa de Odón	29,294	68.05	422.5		Juan Pedro Izquierdo	People's Party	2023
Villavieja del Lozoya	327	23.29	13.5		Aránzazu Reguera	Localist	2023
Zarzalejo	1,870	20.63	87.7		Rafael Herranz	People's Party	2019

== See also ==
- Geography of the Community of Madrid
- Madrid-related lists
- List of cities in Spain
