= Antonio Rodríguez de Hita =

Spanish composer

Antonio Rodríguez de Hita (18 January 1722 – 21 February 1787) was a Spanish composer.

== Life ==
Rodríguez was born at Valverde de Alcalá on 18 January 1722. He became maestro de capilla at Palencia Cathedral (c.1740-c.1757) and at the Royal Convent of La Encarnación, Madrid.

His father, Marcos Rodríguez del Mercado, a schoolteacher at Corpa Madrid, forced him to study at the college of the Cathedral of Alcalá de Henares, where he studied Latin, music theory, plainchant, organ and composition. Early in August 1738, he was named second organist in the cathedral and in September was appointed maestro de capilla through open competition. Rodríguez took holy orders later. His earliest known works are the Vespers for 2 choirs written in the old style, 1740.

In August 1744 he became maestro de capilla at Palencia Cathedral. In 1747 he was ordained priest and remained at Palencia until at death of José Mir y Lusa, maestro at the Royal Convent of La Encarnación, Madrid. While at Palencia he wrote the treatise Diapasón instructivo (1757) in which he promoted the French and Italian homophonic styles over the old Spanish style.

In 1765 Rodríguez was named Mir's replacement and moved to Madrid in 1765. At this point he had already composed the 250 sacred works that constitute the bulk his oeuvre. Only three years after his arrival in Madrid he started his activity as a theatrical composer in association with the playwright Ramón de la Cruz, with whom he helped create the national zarzuela style. Their first work was Briseida (1768), a heroic zarzuela, based on a modernization of the work of Pedro Calderón de la Barca which was a great success. This was followed by the comedy Las segadoras de Vallecas, and in the next year, 1769, another rural comedy Las labradoras de Murcia. Rodríguez returned to the heroic genre with Scipión en Cartagena, but this was not well received and Rodríguez began to concentrate again on sacred music.

In 1777, taking advantage of his high standing in society, Rodríguez wrote a report on the state of music in Spain and demanded the creation of an Academy of Music to promote a Spanish style – though his own definition of the new Spanish style included many French and Italian characteristics. He died in Madrid.

Rodríguez de Hita was also teacher of the poet and musician Tomás de Iriarte.

== Works ==
=== Musical treatises ===
- Diapasón instructivo (1757)

=== Sacred ===
- Vísperas a 2 coros (1740)
- Canciones instrumentales (Escala diatónico-chromático-enharmónica) (1751)
- Completas (1751)
- Psalms a 8 voces Credidi (1756) y Laudate Dominum (1759)
- Misa Exsultavit ut gigas (1758)
- Villancicos Venid, escuchad, prestad atención (1746), Ha de este trono (1757), Esferas, qué es esto (1763) y Alegres las campanas (1764)
- Villancicos Venid al portal y Oye, pues, divino amor (1776); Para quién es, gitanillas, el panderillo (1780); En fieros huracanes (1770); Alto alorbe, (1777); Dadme consuelo, (1775) y Oh Admirable (1780)
- Masses O gloriosa virginum (1771); Pange lingua (1772); Jesu corona virginum (1774); Misa de difuntos (1778)

=== Theatrical ===
- El chasco del cortejo, tonadilla a solo (1768, Madrid, Teatro del Príncipe)
- Briseida (libretto Ramón de la Cruz), heroic zarzuela, 2 acts (11 July 1768, Madrid, Teatro del Príncipe)
- Las segadoras de Vallecas (libretto Ramón de la Cruz), burlesque zarzuela (3 September 1768, Madrid, Teatro del Príncipe)
- Las labradoras de Murcia (libretto Ramón de la Cruz), burlesque zarzuela, 2 acts (16 Sep 1769, Madrid, Teatro del Príncipe)
- Hormesinda (libretto Nicolás Fernández de Moratín), tragedy, 5 acts (12 Feb 1770, Madrid, Teatro del Príncipe)
- Scipión en Cartagena (libretto Agustín Cordero), heroic zarzuela, 2 acts (15 July 1770, Madrid, Teatro del Príncipe)
- El loco, vano y valiente, zarzuela, 2 acts (31 March 1771, Madrid, Teatro del Príncipe), (at least 1 aria in act II)
- La república de las mujeres (libretto Ramón de la Cruz from Les Amazones Modernes by Marc-Antoine Legrand and Louis Fuzelier), sainete (4 October 1772, Madrid, Teatro del Príncipe)

== Recordings ==
- Canciones instrumentales. La Grande Chapelle, dir. Albert Recasens (Lauda LAU005)
- Mass "O gloriosa Virginum". La Grande Chapelle, dir. Albert Recasens(Lauda LAU009)
- La Briseida, opera (extracts) Aria No. 4. Amor, sólo tu encanto. Aria No. 13. Deydad que las venganzas. María Bayo, Les Talens Lyriques, Naive. on Arias de Zarzuela Barroca. (Naïve 8885).

== Editions ==
- De pena de susto. from Las labradoras de Murcia in Spanish Theater Songs – Baroque and Classical Eras: Medium High Voice/Medium Low Voice By Carol Mikkelsen
