= Moraleja de Enmedio =

Coordinates: 40°16′N 3°51′W

- Municipality
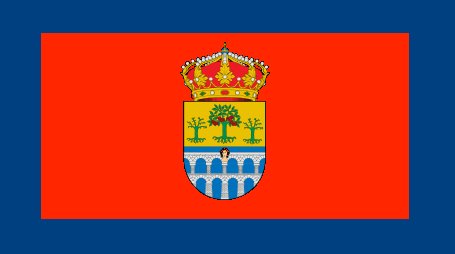
- Flag Coat of arms

- Municipal location within the Community of Madrid.
- Country: Spain
- Autonomous community: Community of Madrid

Area
  - Total: 12 sq mi (31 km^{2})
- Elevation: 2,200 ft (670 m)

Population (2025-01-01)
  - Total: 5,580
  - Density: 412.5/sq mi (159.26/km^{2})
- Time zone: UTC+1 (CET)
  - Summer (DST): UTC+2 (CEST)

Moraleja de Enmedio (Spanish pronunciation: [moɾaˈlexa ðe emˈmeðjo]) is a municipality of the Community of Madrid, Spain.

== The municipality ==
It has a surface of 3,087.34 ha and a median elevation of 670 m. Moraleja de Enmedio limits with the municipalities of Móstoles, Fuenlabrada, Humanes de Madrid, Arroyomolinos, Navalcarnero, Batres, Serranillos del Valle and Griñón.

== History ==
Moraleja de Enmedio existed since the 12th century, date when it is mentioned in a document about territorial disputes of the city of Segovia. This talks about two neighboring location, nowadays deserted, called Moraleja La Mayor and Moraleja de Los Buyeros, explaining these two the surname of Enmedio (in the middle).

In 1757, the municipality becomes part of the province of Madrid, after being part of Segovia and Toledo.

Nowadays, Moraleja de Enmedio is known as being the town where the television comedy Aquí no hay quien viva was recorded. Since 2007, in the periphery of the municipality the comedy La que se avecina is recorded.

== See also ==
- Internacional de Madrid CF, main football team in the town.
