= Cueva Des-Cubierta =

Spanish cave site of Neanderthal remains

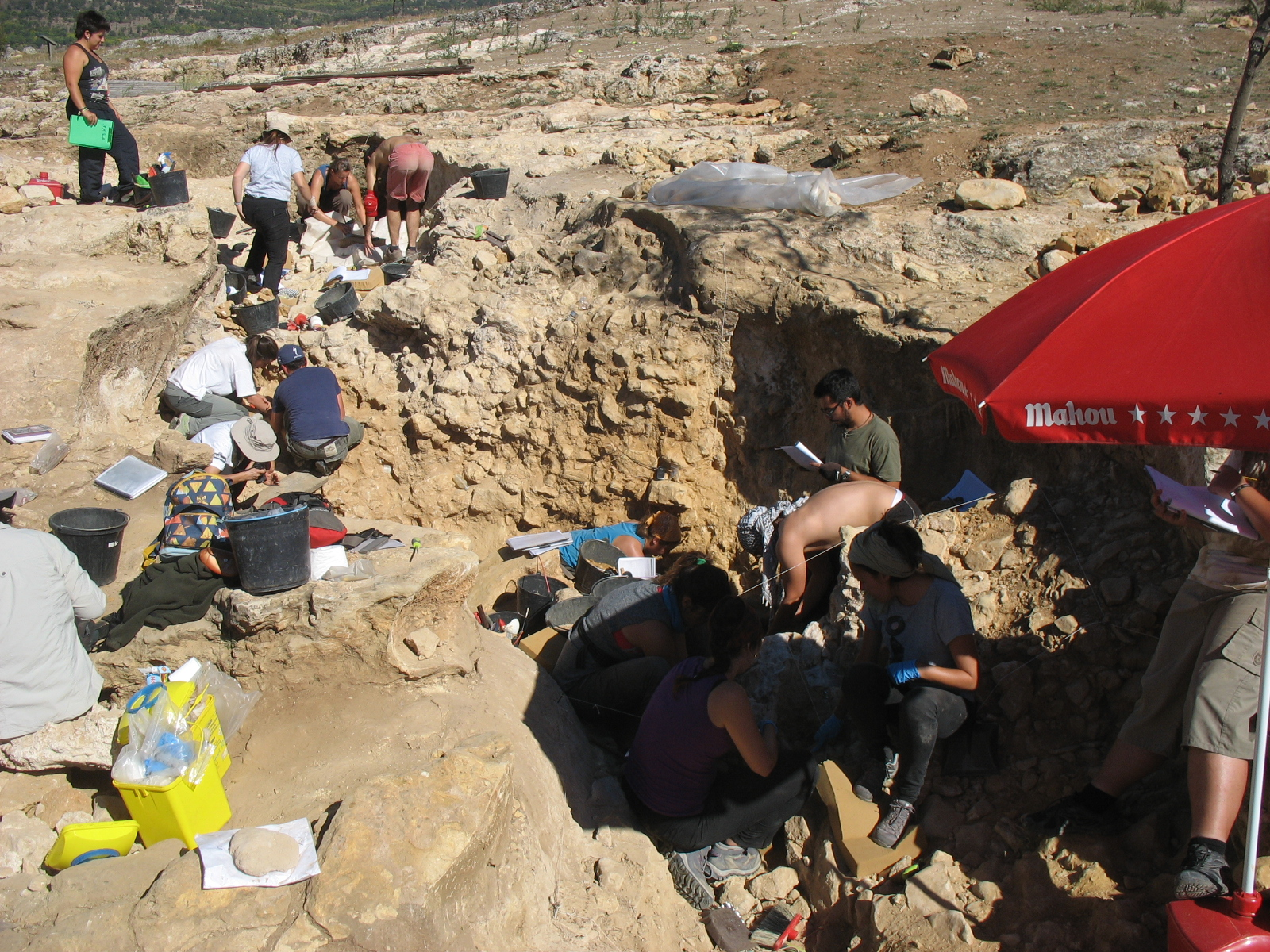
- Excavation field work at Cueva Des-Cubierta in Pinilla del Valle, Madrid, Spain.
- Interactive map of Cueva Des-Cubierta
- 40°55′23″N 3°48′29″W
- Type: Cave
- Periods: Early-mid Late Pleistocene
- Associated with: Neanderthals
- Region: Pinilla del Valle

Site notes
- Elevation: 1,112 m (3,648 ft)
- Length: 87 m (285 ft)
- Width: 1–4.5 m (3 ft 3 in – 14 ft 9 in)
- Archaeologists: Enrique Baquedano, Juan Luis Arsuaga
- Discovered: Spring 2009
- Management: Community of Madrid
- Public access: Valle de los Neandertales archaeological park

Designations
- Designation: Excavations largely headed by the Regional Archaeological Museum of the Community of Madrid

Cueva Des-Cubierta is the name of a cave in Pinilla del Valle, Community of Madrid, Spain where Neanderthal presence is noted for possible Neanderthal ritual significance due to specifically arranged collections of animal bones. The name has a double meaning in Spanish, as "Des-Cubierta" can be interpreted as both "discovered" and "uncovered", and the site was discovered during the removal of plant mass which uncovered the cavity of the site.

The area is located within the 2015 inaugurated "Valle de los Neandertales" ("Valley of the Neanderthals”) archaeological park. The Valle de los Neandertales has previously hosted public viewings of particular Neanderthal enclaves in Pinilla del Valle, and educational seminars through the European Society for the study of Human Evolution (ESHE) have also hosted viewings of the cave.

== Description ==
The cave lies within the karst dolomite hill Calvero de la Higuera in Pinilla del Valle, Community of Madrid, Spain, an area noted for Neanderthal presence in the area prehistorically for their use of it for camps and shelter 40,000 years ago. Cueva Des-Cubierta was unearthed accidentally during a land survey in spring 2006 meant to focus on a different, previously found site. The area has had archaeological work done in it since 2002, including nearby Yacimientos del Calvero de la Higuera, Navalmaíllo Rock Shelter site, Cueva del Camino (Camino Cave), Cueva de la Buena Pinta (Buena Pinta Cave), and Abrigo del Ocelado (Ocelado Rock Shelter). The zigzagging cave has a main gallery with at least five openings, measuring 87 m in length and 1-4.5 m wide at an altitude of 1,112 m, preserved due to surface breccia and infilling protecting the site from erosion. Inside the cave on Level 3, there are multiple piles of remains of animals, including the horn cores of aurochs (Bos primigenius) and steppe bison (Bison priscus), as well as the antlers of red deer (Cervus elaphus). In total, there were more than 30 specimens discovered. Spores associated with combustion were also found, hinting to the presence of small fires in Level 3. Some smaller bones showed signs of exposure to fire. There were also dental remains and a jaw found in Level 3, which may have belonged to a single Neanderthal female child between the age of three and five years old, as well quartz Mousterian lithic tools in Level 2. The total amount of tools amounted to over 1,000 objects, including anvils and other shaped tools. 2,265 animal remains of at least 2 cm in size were found in total. The remains of the five teeth and the mandible fragment were CT scanned to acquire the developmental stage of the teeth and to facilitate a virtual reconstruction of the mandible. Dental assessment of the wear on the teeth also suggested that the age of the child dubbed the "Lozoya Child", is close to the Roc de Marsal Neanderthal infant. The cave sit within subhorizontal conduits outcrops of Cretaceous marine carbonate, along the right bank of the upper River Lozoya Valley, and the cave has an extensive microvertebrate record because of this. Major figures in the discovery and excavation of the site are Enrique Baquedano (archaeologist and director of Regional Archaeological Museum of the Community of Madrid), paleoanthropologist Juan Luis Arsuaga, and geologist Alfredo Pérez González.

== Dating ==
The markings on the skull of a narrow-nosed rhinoceros are consistent with the butchery of what was likely Neanderthals. This skull dates from the early-mid Late Pleistocene epoch, or MIS 4 to early MIS 3, roughly 71,000 to 43,000 years ago. The remains of the Lozoya Child have been dated to be 38,000 to 42,000 years old. Radiocarbon dating was used on bone remains at the Oxford Radiocarbon Accelerator Unit, and uranium–thorium dating was used on speleothems at the Uranium Series Laboratory of the Centro Nacional de Investigación sobre la Evolución Humana (CENIEH) and the Geochronology Laboratory of the Jaume Almera Institute of Earth Sciences (CSIC). The archaeological deposits range in age from approximately 135,000 years and 50,000 years ago.

== Proposed significance ==
The placement of the piles of animal remains in Level 3 suggests that the cave was not a dwelling, and the build-up of the hearths suggests the space was used long-term. Skulls were not arranged in any obvious spatial patterns. The collection of large herbivore skulls at Level 3 of the site has been proposed to be a significant 2023 finding in paleomammalogy in that it may have had ritualistic/symbolic meaning to Neanderthals. Due to pieces being missing of the found narrow-nosed rhinoceros skull, the remains suggest that the animal was butchered off-site, and the skull was brought specifically to the cave, suggesting the collection was a hunting trophy. The Mousterian lithic tools and arrangement of the hearths also do not suggest the area was a dwelling. There has been consideration that some of the hearths may have been funerary, as the burial of children with horn core have been found elsewhere, though the majority of the hearths do not contain child remains. In 2015, the site was named to possibly be the first Neanderthal child burial on the Iberian Peninsula, and in south Europe. Rebecca Wragg Sykes has noted additional proposals that the collection of hearths may qualify as Neanderthal art and show Neanderthal capability for higher cognition.

== Gallery ==
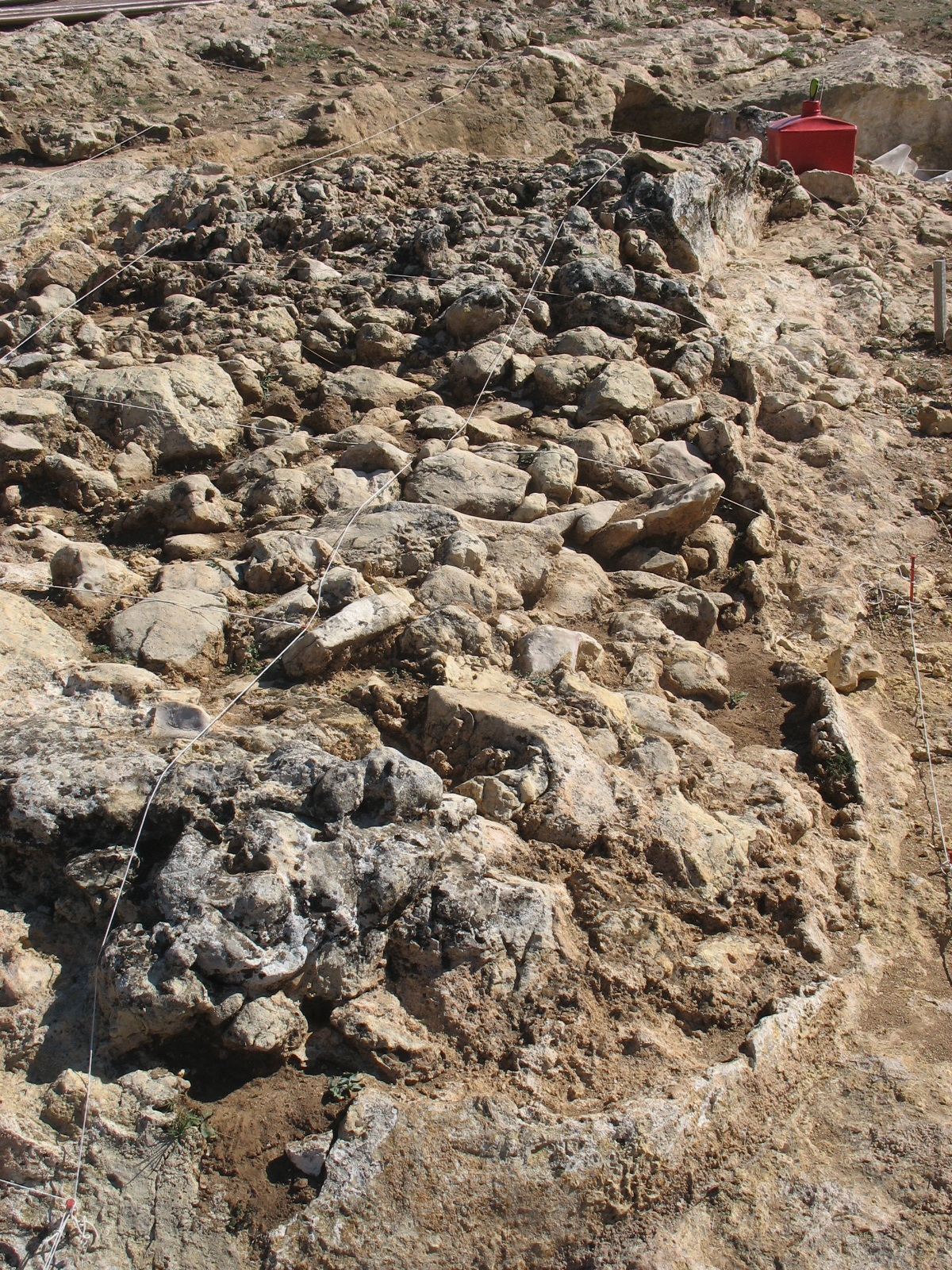
Cueva Des-Cubierta's breccia infilling and cave wall.

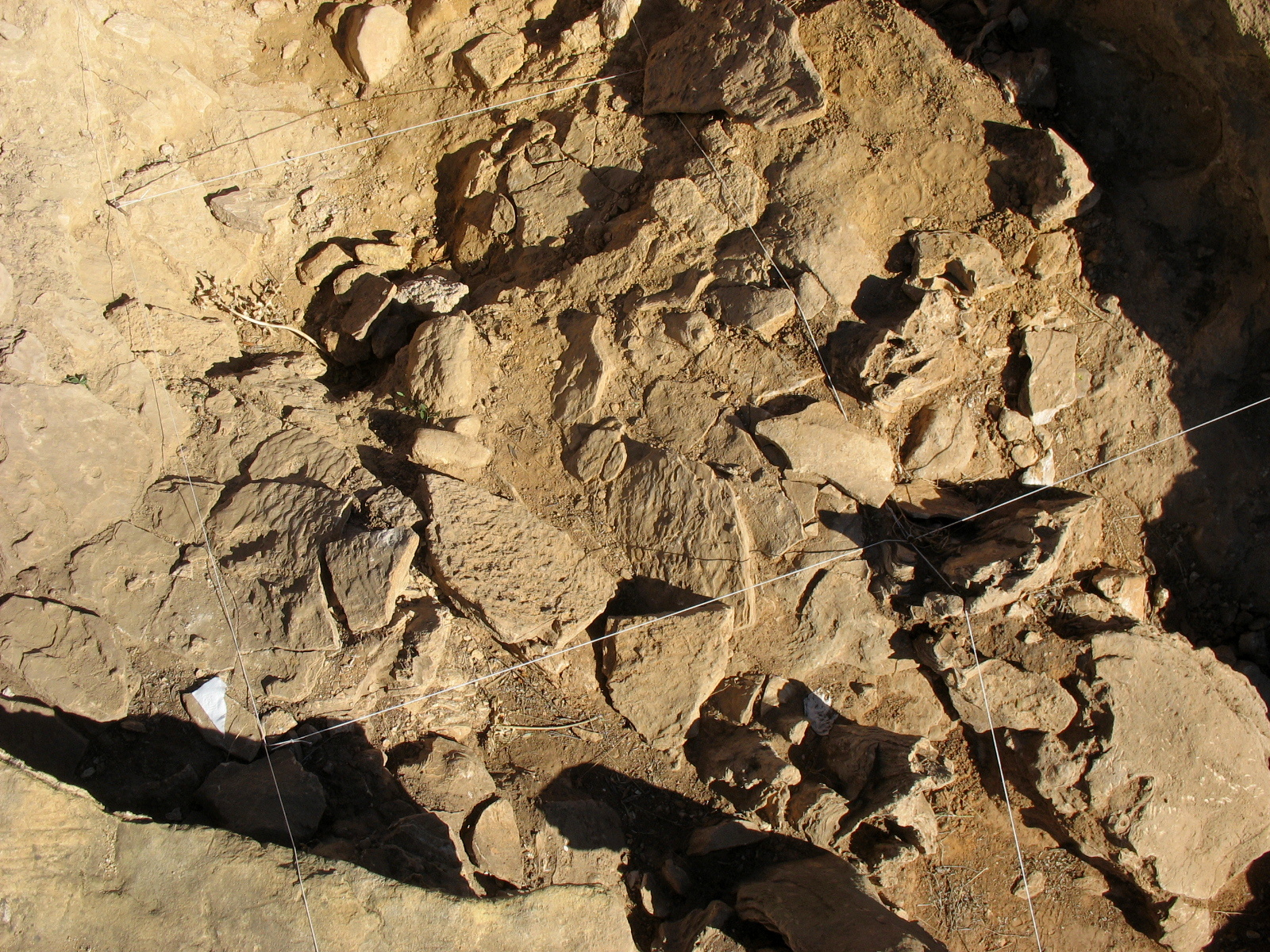
Photo taken from above at the Cueva Des-Cubierta site.

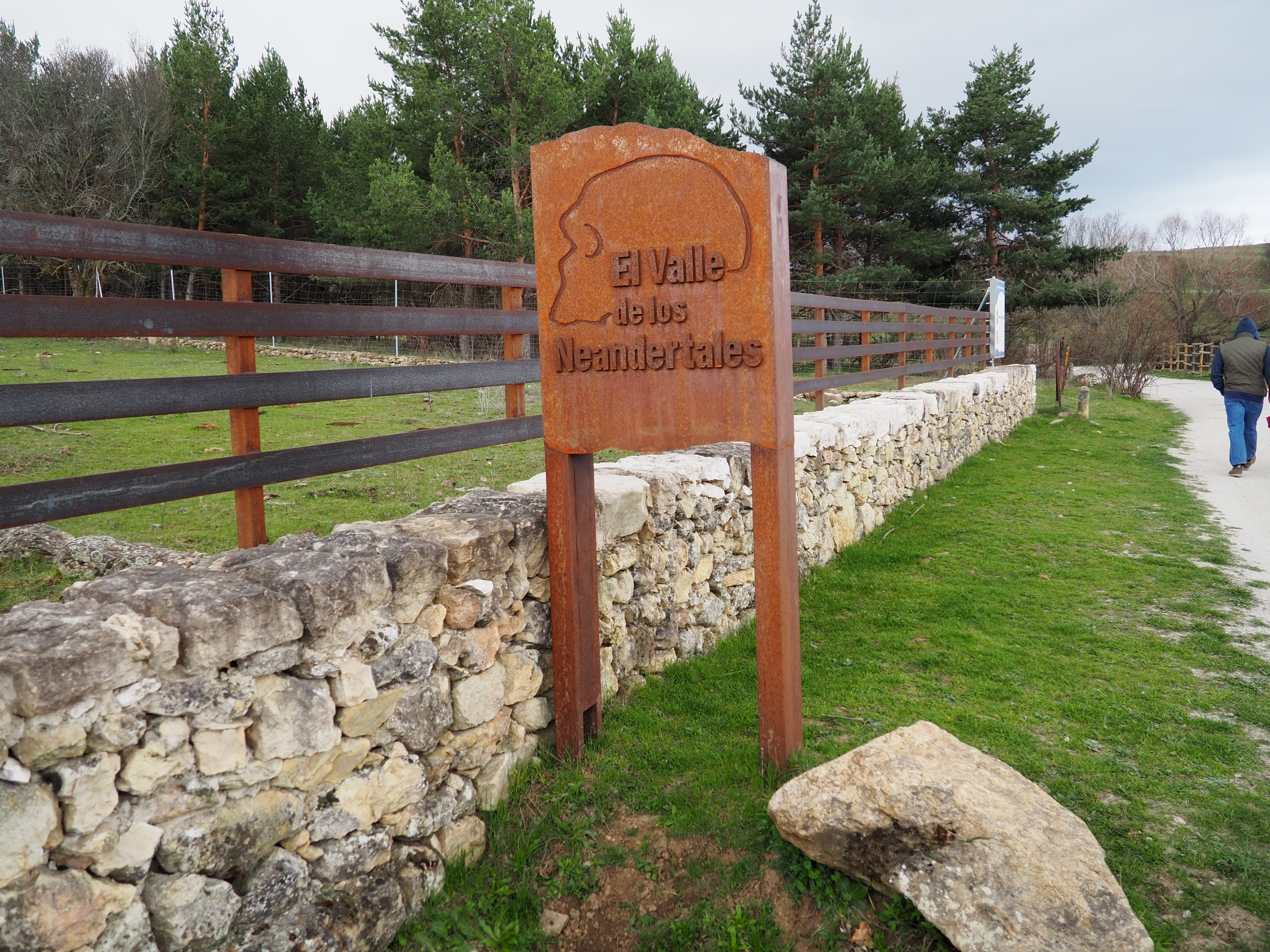
Photo of the Valle de los Neandertales sign at the archaeological park.

== See also ==
- Neanderthal trophies at Cueva Des-Cubierta
