= Valdelaguna =

- Municipality
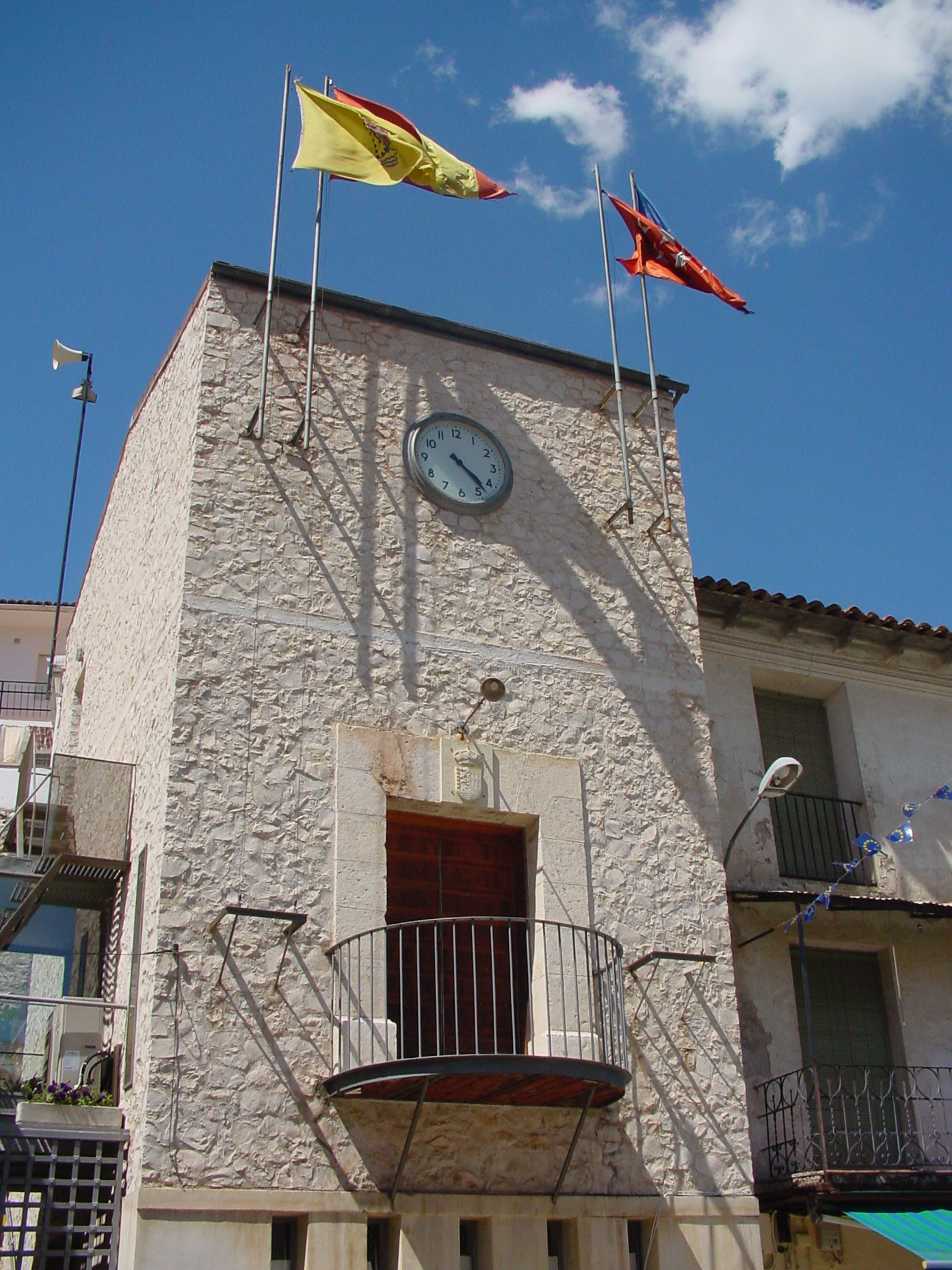
- Town hall

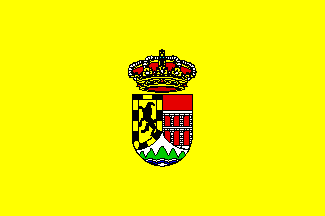
- Flag Coat of arms

- Location in Spain
- Coordinates: 40°9′42″N 3°22′5″W
- Country: Spain
- Autonomous community: Madrid
- Province: Madrid

Area
  - Total: 4,213 km^{2} (1,627 sq mi)
- Elevation: 702 m (2,303 ft)

Population (2025-01-01)
  - Total: 1,122
  - Density: 0.2663/km^{2} (0.6898/sq mi)
- Demonym: Valdelagunero/a. Abubillo/a
- Time zone: UTC+1 (CET)
  - Summer (DST): UTC+2 (CEST)
- Postal code: 28391
- Website: Official website

Valdelaguna is a Spanish town in the province of Madrid. It is located southeast of the district, in Las Vegas region, 49 km from Madrid city. It is bordered by the towns of Chinchón, Belmonte de Tajo, Villarejo de Salvanés, Perales de Tajuña, Morata de Tajuña and Colmenar de Oreja. It covers an area of 41.89 km ², has an average altitude of 702 m and the adjective of its inhabitants is Abubillo / a. (Valdelaguneros).

== Population ==
- 867 inhabitants (2017).

Farming and ranching are still present in the city's economy, finding pig and sheep farms and vineyards and olive crops. The presence of cereal crops such as corn and sunflower is marginal. There are quarries of limestone and gypsum but still the development of the industrial sector is not particularly relevant in the municipality. Production of cheese, wine and pork for family businesses. The construction phenomenon is present in some years now because of the proximity of Madrid. This means a more dynamic economic activity by creating new jobs but most of the new inhabitants must travel to work. 3 bars, 2 lodgings and stores traditional staples and complete the panorama Valdelaguna economic sector.

== History ==
In the first documentary record of the municipality, dated February 4, 1156, Alfonso VII donated to the Church of San Ginés in Madrid and his prior, Salvanés villa (Villarejo de Salvanés), granting manorial right over the territory which included among others the term Val de la Laguna. Later, in 1190, appears in the Transierra integrated, between Segovia lands in the south of the Central System, in the sexmo of Valdemoro. In 1480 the Catholic Monarchs include this sexmo in the lordship of Chinchón, obtaining also the title of Villa by the hands of monarchs. The municipality remains bound to this manor later, when converted into County Chinchón.

Valdelaguna appears in the Relaciones Topográficas de Felipe II, in 1580 which is recorded the existence of the lake that gives the town its name, "the royal road to Perales Valdelaguna there a meadow and in it a very good water spring where is a lagoon, in winter it runs to the Tajuña river. " This lake was drained afterward from malarial fevers caused their water scarce in the population. In these same Relaciones... said the village has 98 households and neighbors 100–103. They cite five chapels: St. Stephen, the oldest, San Sebastian and San Roque erected on the occasion of epidemics and pestilences, the Magdalena, half a league from the town, next to Tajuña, where they used to go in procession litanies, and Santo Toribio, included those currently in the cemetery.

There are documents that tell the people suffered looting in the War of the Spanish Succession by the troops of the Archduke Charles, which was destroyed the archive that the town possessed. In 1785 when answering the questionnaire sent by the Cardinal Lorenzana population has 361 inhabitants and, in addition to agriculture, there are some common canvas looms hemp, which means the appearance of the guild of craftsmen .

In the 19th century, with the abolition of primogeniture and the division into provinces in 1833, the town is built in the province of Madrid and passes Chinchón County rely on Judicial District of the same name. In his Dictionary, Madoz counted 464 inhabitants and speak from two sources that supply water to the people of good quality, jail and primary school education.

With the 20th century continued growth in the population. During the Civil War the term, characterized by hills and ravines, becomes war front and the Church is sacked. In 1960, 946 persons were counted, the largest demographic development so far. The growing influence of Madrid and the phenomenon of property bubble in Spain, have led to a significant urban development and infrastructure to the detriment of the natural environment and cultural heritage of the municipality.

In Valdelaguna born on V.P. Miguel de la Fuente, 16th century mystic writer, painter of the 19th century Ventura Miera and in 1911 the filmmaker Antonio del Amo, chief among other popular films of Joselito.
