= Gabriela Dancău =

Romanian diplomat (born 1977)

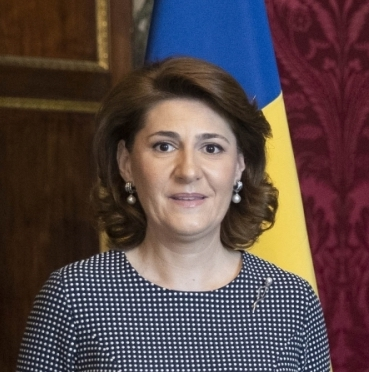
- Dancău at the Quirinal Palace, 2022

Ambassador of Romania to Italy, Malta and San Marino
- Incumbent
- Assumed office 1 April 2022
- President: Klaus Iohannis; Nicușor Dan

Ambassador of Romania to Spain
- In office September 2016 – 7 February 2022
- President: Klaus Iohannis

Consul General of Romania in Lyon
- In office 2011–2016

Director of the Consular Relations Department, Ministry of Foreign Affairs
- In office 2009–2011

Personal details
- Born: 5 July 1977 (age 49) Romania
- Education: Bucharest University of Economic Studies; École nationale d'administration
- Profession: Diplomat
- Awards: Ambassador of the Year in Italy (2024); Order of Saint Maria Brâncoveanu (2026)

Gabriela Dancău (born 5 July 1977), also spelled Dancau, is a Romanian career diplomat who has served as Ambassador Extraordinary and Plenipotentiary of Romania to Italy, Malta and San Marino since 2022, and concurrently as Romania's Permanent Representative to the United Nations food and agriculture agencies in Rome.

Trained as an economist and a specialist in consular affairs, Dancău rose through Romania's foreign ministry to head its Consular Relations Department, before serving as Consul General in Lyon and, from 2016 to 2022, as ambassador to Spain, home to one of the largest Romanian communities abroad. She received the diplomatic rank of ambassador in 2021.

Her posting in Rome has coincided with a period of renewed political, cultural and religious ties between Romania and Italy. During her mission the two governments held their first joint meeting in 13 years and updated their Enhanced Strategic Partnership (2024); her embassy organised the largest Romanian archaeological exhibition abroad in decades (2023–2024) and conceived the first joint Romania–Italy Cultural Year (2026); and the Italian state granted legal recognition to the Romanian Orthodox Diocese of Italy (2026). She was named Ambassador of the Year in Italy for 2024 and received a patriarchal order from the Romanian Orthodox Church in 2026.

== Early life and education ==
Dancău was born on 5 July 1977 in Romania. She completed her secondary education at the Matei Basarab High School in Strehaia in 1996.

She graduated in 2000 from the Faculty of Economic Cybernetics, Statistics and Informatics of the Bucharest University of Economic Studies, specialising in economic cybernetics. She went on to earn two master's degrees, in advanced international relations from the École des Hautes Études Internationales – Centre d'études diplomatiques et stratégiques in Paris, and in cybernetics from her Bucharest faculty. Her diplomatic training included the postgraduate international relations course of the Diplomatic Academy in Bucharest and a course in diplomatic negotiation practice at the École nationale d'administration (ENA) in Paris. She speaks French, Russian, Spanish, Italian and English.

== Diplomatic career ==
=== Consular and European affairs ===
Dancău built her early career in consular work, a field that combined her technical background with diplomacy. She served as consul at the Romanian Embassy in Paris and as coordinator of the foreign ministry's Visa Centre, and she trained the consular staff of Romania's missions abroad to use the country's first computerised visa-management system, for which her systems analysis provided the groundwork. She also taught specialised consular courses to the ministry's diplomatic and consular personnel.

Her expertise was drawn on during Romania's preparations to join the European Union: she was a member of the expert-level working group on Justice and Home Affairs that prepared the country's 2007 accession. From 2009 to 2011 she directed the ministry's Consular Relations Department.

=== Consul General in Lyon ===
In 2011 Dancău took charge of the Consulate General of Romania in Lyon. After five years there, in April 2016, she was proposed as Romania's next ambassador to Spain, her first ambassadorship.

=== Ambassador to Spain ===
Appointed by presidential decree in June 2016, Dancău took up her post in Madrid in September 2016 and was formally accredited that autumn. Spain is home to around one million Romanians, and her mission spanned Romania's presidency of the Council of the European Union in the first half of 2019, during which she maintained extensive coordination with the Spanish authorities. Her contacts with the Spanish government included the interior minister, Fernando Grande-Marlaska, and during the COVID-19 pandemic the embassy supported vulnerable families, donating a tonne of food in Perales de Tajuña.

In December 2021, shortly before leaving Madrid, she was granted the rank of ambassador, the highest grade in the Romanian diplomatic service. Her mission in Spain ended on 7 February 2022, when she moved to Rome.

=== Ambassador to Italy, Malta and San Marino ===
==== A key posting ====
Italy is one of Romania's most important partners: its second-largest trading partner, the leading source of foreign-owned companies in Romania, and home to more than one million Romanians, Italy's largest foreign community. President Klaus Iohannis appointed Dancău to Rome, with concurrent accreditation to Malta and San Marino, by decrees of 1 March and 14 April 2022, and she took charge of the embassy on 1 April 2022.

Within weeks she had convened the leaders of Romanian associations, religious denominations and media in Italy, together with the heads of the seven Romanian consulates in the country, to set out her priorities for the community, and announced that such meetings would become regular. She presented her credentials to President Sergio Mattarella on 12 May 2022, to San Marino's Captains Regent later that year, and in Malta on 17 November 2022. She also represents Romania at the Food and Agriculture Organization, the International Fund for Agricultural Development and the World Food Programme.

==== Strategic partnership ====
Dancău set out her political agenda in a May 2023 interview marking her first year in Rome. She identified security and defence as a pillar of the two countries' Enhanced Strategic Partnership, noted Italy's consistent support for Romania's accession to the Schengen Area and both countries' backing for EU enlargement to the Western Balkans, Moldova and Ukraine, and announced that the partnership, first agreed in 1997, would be revised through a new joint declaration.

That objective was achieved on 15 February 2024, when Prime Ministers Marcel Ciolacu and Giorgia Meloni chaired the third joint meeting of the Romanian and Italian governments in Rome, the first since 2011. The two leaders signed a joint declaration updating the Enhanced Strategic Partnership and setting cooperation priorities for the years ahead, alongside sectoral cooperation documents, and a business forum brought together more than 200 Romanian and Italian investors. During the same visit, the Romanian government undertook to fund the restoration of the gilded bronze statue of Saint Peter atop Trajan's Column, estimated at about €106,000. Dancău later counted the summit, the joint declaration and the accompanying Romania–Italy Economic Forum among the main results of her mission.

She was also part of Romania's delegation, led by Foreign Minister Oana Țoiu, at the Ukraine Recovery Conference co-hosted by Italy and Ukraine in Rome in July 2025.

==== Romanian community and the Orthodox Church ====
Dancău has treated the Romanian community as the human foundation of the bilateral relationship. Romania's diplomatic and consular network in Italy comprises the embassy, seven career consulates, four honorary consulates and two cultural institutes; in 2023 she inaugurated new premises for the honorary consulate in Genoa and installed its new honorary consul, a prominent figure in the city's business community. The embassy also publishes a fortnightly podcast of stories and fairy tales, read by cultural figures, for Romanian children in Italy, Malta and San Marino.

After a process lasting several years, the Italian state concluded an intesa (agreement under Article 8 of the Constitution of Italy) with the Romanian Orthodox Diocese of Italy, giving it legal recognition. The Chamber of Deputies approved the agreement on 12 February 2026 and the Senate passed it unanimously; it became Law No. 126 of 8 July 2026. Dancău's contribution to the process was recognised by the Romanian Patriarchate later that month (see below), and in October 2026, addressing a congress of Romanian Orthodox clergy from Western and Southern Europe in Rome, she highlighted the importance of the new legal framework for the community's religious and social life.

==== Cultural diplomacy ====
From the start of her mandate, Dancău made cultural cooperation a priority, arguing that culture is the most accessible way to get to know a people.

Her first major project was the exhibition Dacia. L'ultima frontiera della Romanità (Dacia: The Last Frontier of Roman Civilisation), held at the Baths of Diocletian of the National Roman Museum from November 2023 to April 2024 under the high patronage of both presidents. Made possible by the embassy in partnership with the National History Museum of Romania and the National Roman Museum, it brought together more than 1,000 artefacts from 47 museums, many shown in Italy for the first time. It was the largest Romanian archaeological exhibition organised abroad in decades, marked 150 years since Romania opened its first diplomatic agency in Italy, and drew more than 55,000 visitors.

In 2024 the embassy marked the 145th anniversary of Romanian–Italian diplomatic relations with a concert by the Madrigal National Chamber Choir in the Pantheon and an exhibition of Romanian and Italian diplomatic archives, opened on 18 October 2024 at the Chamber of Deputies' Palazzo Valdina. In 2026 a further exhibition on the history of Romanian–Italian diplomatic relations, promoted by Dancău and Romania's honorary consul in Tuscany, opened at the Regional Council of Tuscany in Florence.

These projects laid the groundwork for the Romania–Italy Cultural Year 2026, the first joint cultural year ever organised by the two countries. Devised by the embassy, it was formalised by a joint declaration of intent between the two foreign ministries, prepared with the Italian Chamber of Deputies' Culture Committee, and placed under the high patronage of Presidents Nicușor Dan and Sergio Mattarella. It opened on 1 December 2025, Romania's National Day, with a gala concert by the orchestra of the Bucharest National Opera at the Teatro dell'Opera di Roma, attended by the culture ministers of both countries. Its programme took Romanian culture to major Italian venues, including:

- an exhibition dedicated to Constantin Brâncuși at Trajan's Market in Rome (February 2026);
- the multimedia exhibition Balnea Daciae on the Roman baths of Dacia, promoted by the embassy with the National History Museum of Romania and the Pompeii Archaeological Park, in the Forum Baths of Pompeii (July–September 2026);
- a concert by the Romanian Chamber Orchestra at the Teatro Massimo in Palermo (June 2026);
- talks with the mayor of Bari on cooperation between the city's Teatro Petruzzelli and the Cluj-Napoca National Opera; and
- a commemorative plaque to Queen Marie of Romania in the Parco Virgiliano in Naples (October 2026).

In January 2026, speaking at the presentation of a book on Trajan's Column in the Curia Julia, Dancău highlighted the embassy's research cooperation with the Colosseum Archaeological Park and the National History Museum of Romania, and Romania's support for restoring the column's statue.

==== Malta and San Marino ====
In San Marino, Dancău presented her credentials to Captains Regent Maria Luisa Berti and Manuel Ciavatta at the Palazzo Pubblico, introduced by Foreign Secretary Luca Beccari. In Malta, her accreditation visit included a meeting with the Maltese culture minister, after which Malta proposed a memorandum of understanding on cultural cooperation with Romania.

== Honours and awards ==
- Ambassador of the Year in Italy (2024) – Dancău shared the Gazzetta Diplomatica prize for 2024 with Argentina's ambassador, following a vote held at John Cabot University in Rome. The winners were announced at the Italian Senate in October 2024, and she received the award at the Campidoglio on 14 November 2024, attributing it to the work of Romania's entire diplomatic and consular network in Italy.
- Order of Saint Maria Brâncoveanu (2026) – conferred by Patriarch Daniel of Romania and presented by Bishop Siluan of Italy in Rome on 30 July 2026, in recognition of her support for the Romanian community in Italy and her contribution to the legal recognition of the Romanian Orthodox Diocese of Italy. She dedicated the distinction to the Romanians living in Italy.
