= Ruins of Talamanca =

Cultural property in Talamanca de Jarama, Spain

- Ruinas de Talamanca (Spanish)
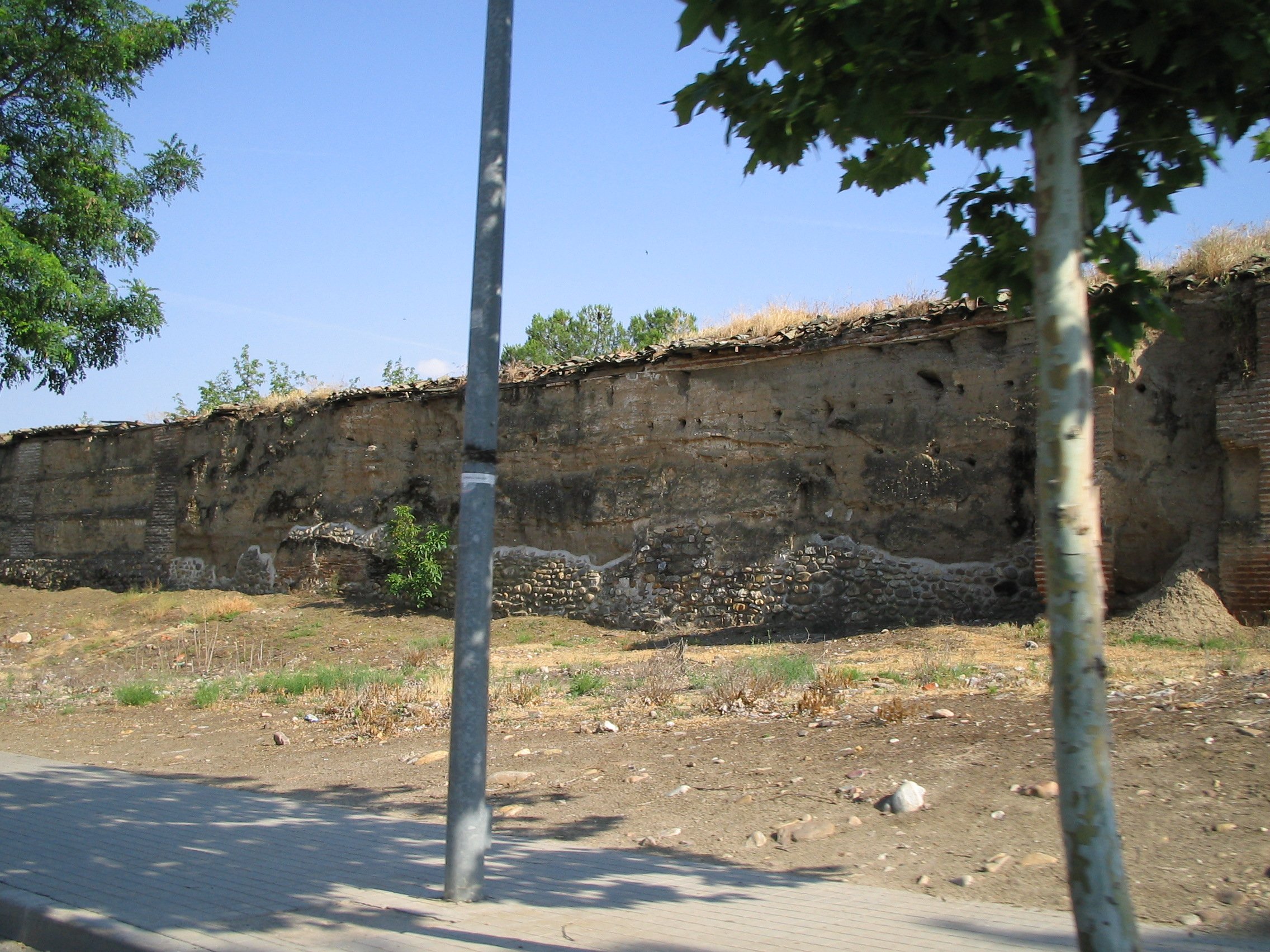

- Location within Spain
- Interactive map of Ruins of Talamanca
- 40.74652°N 3.512108°W
- Location: Talamanca de Jarama, Spain

Spanish Cultural Heritage
- Official name: Ruinas de Talamanca
- Type: Non-movable
- Criteria: Monument
- Designated: 1931
- Reference no.: RI-51-0000723

The Ruins of Talamanca (Spanish: Ruinas de Talamanca) are an archaeological site located in Talamanca de Jarama, Spain. It was declared Bien de Interés Cultural in 1931.
