= Perales de Tajuña =

- Municipality
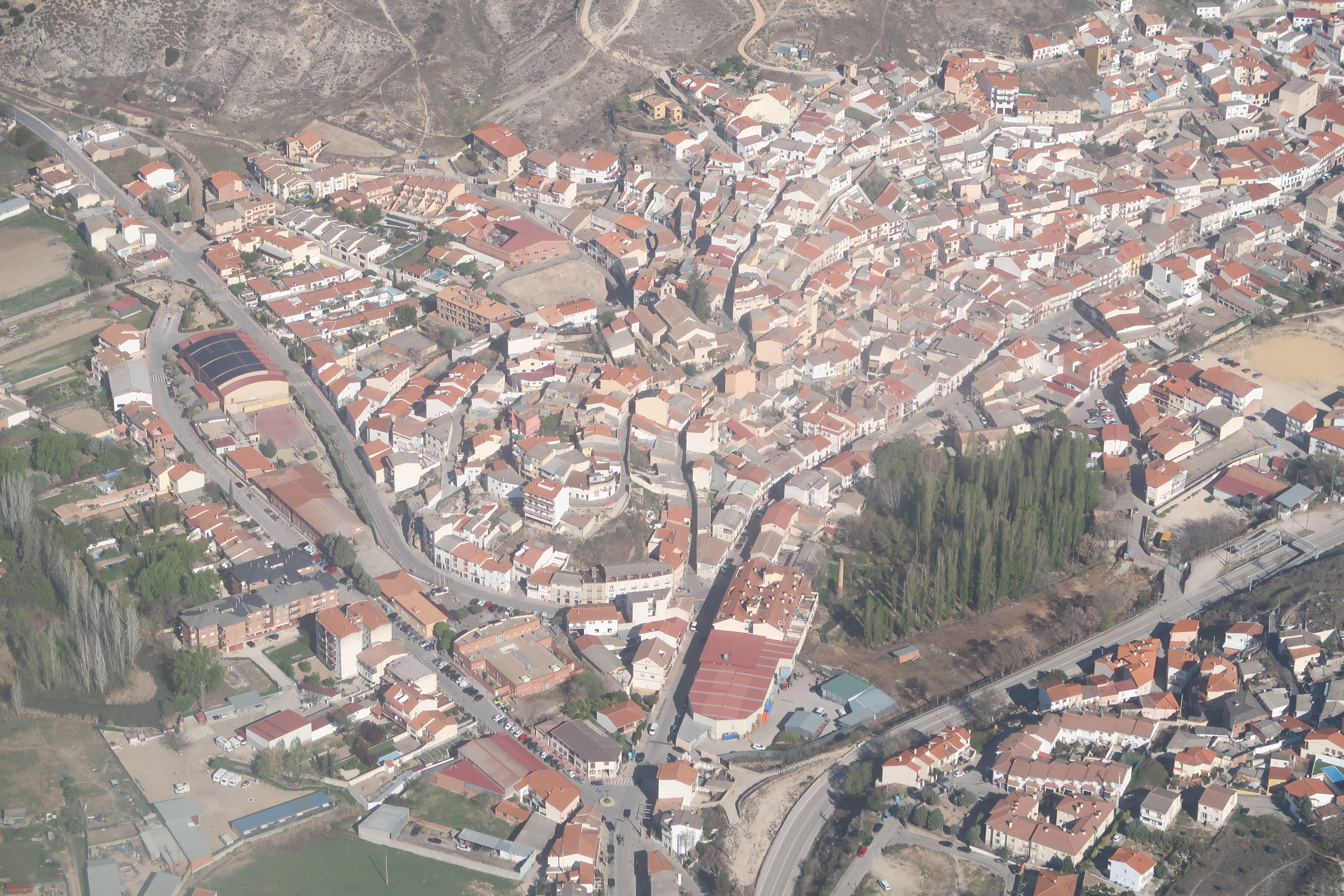

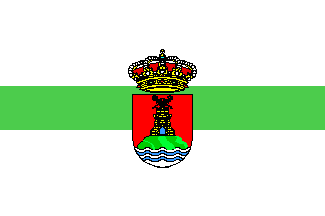
- Flag Coat of arms

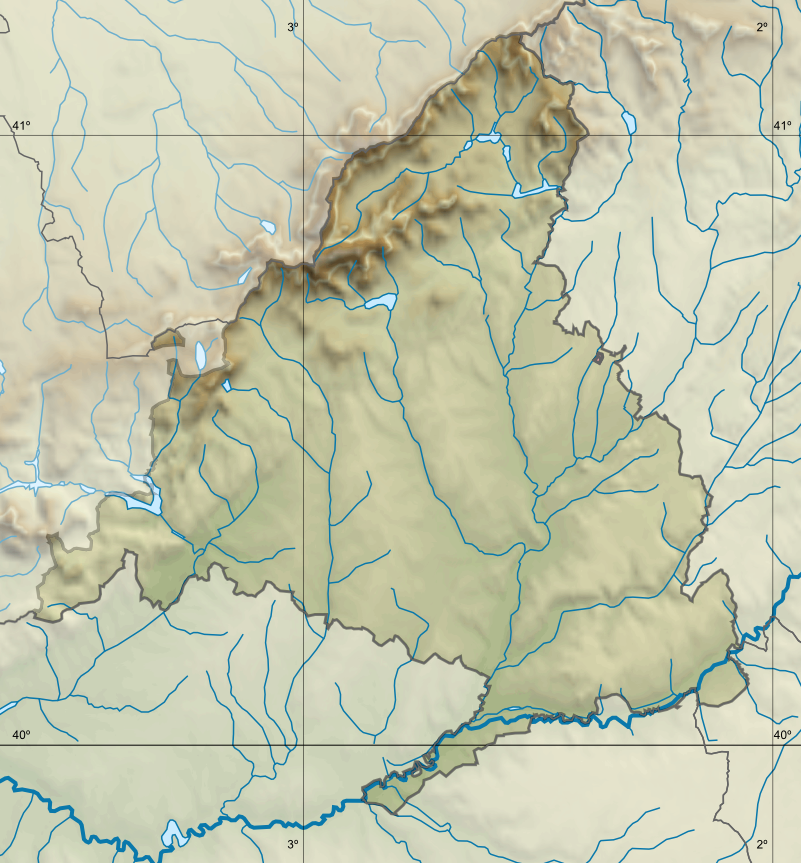
- Location within Spain Location within Community of Madrid
- Coordinates: 40°14′N 3°21′W
- Country: Spain
- Region: Community of Madrid

Government
  - Mayor: Yolanda Cuenca Redondo (Since 2012) (PP)

Area
  - Total: 48.92 km^{2} (18.89 sq mi)
- Elevation: 595 m (1,952 ft)

Population (2025-01-01)
  - Total: 3,260
  - Density: 66.6/km^{2} (173/sq mi)
- Demonym(s): Peraleño,-a
- Postal code: 28540
- Province code: 28
- Website: www.ayto-peralestajuna.org

Perales de Tajuña is a town and municipality of Spain located in the Community of Madrid. It is about 40 km to the southeast of Madrid in the area known as the Comarca de Las Vegas. The municipality covers 48.92 km,^{2} and it has a population of 2,738 inhabitants and a population density of 55.97 inhabitants/km^{2}. To the north it borders with Arganda del Rey and Campo Real, to the east with Tielmes, to the south with Villarejo de Salvanés, and to the west with Morata de Tajuña and Valdelaguna.

== Demographics ==
Historical population
Year	Pop.	±%
1991	1,961	—
1996	1,991	+1.5%
2001	2,089	+4.9%
2004	2,358	+12.9%
2008	2,738	+16.1%

== Education ==
In Perales de Tajuña there is one public nursery school and one infant and primary school, also public.

== Architecture ==
=== Religious ===
- Parish church of Our Lady of the Castle
- Hermitage of San Isidro

=== Historical ===
- Town Hall
- Remains of watchtown and walls
- Ruins of Hermitage of San Sebastián
- Ruins of old hermitage of San Isidro
- Telegraph Tower-Fortress

=== Nature ===
- Risco de las Cuevas (Cliff caves)
- Prado de Arriba (Top field)

=== Fountains ===
- Mariblanca fountain
- Round fountain
- Barracks fountain
- Lagasca fountain
- Butrera fountain

== Festivities ==
- San Blas, third of February
- Our Lady of the Castle, first Sunday of May
- San Isidro, fifteenth of May
- Town festival, month of August

== Communications ==
Perales de Tajuña is well connected by road to Madrid and all the surrounding towns.

- From Madrid: R-3 (toll motorway) or A-3 (dual carriageway); Exits 33A, 35 or 41
- From Arganda del Rey: the old N-III
- From Campo Real: M-220
- From Morata de Tajuña: M-302
- From Tielmes, Carabaña, Orusco, Ambite: M-204
- From Valdelaguna: M-317
- From Villarejo de Salvanés: A-3, Exit 41
