= Villamantilla =

Coordinates: 40°20′N 4°08′W

- Municipality
- Flag Coat of arms

- Municipal location within the Community of Madrid.
- Country: Spain
- Autonomous community: Community of Madrid

Area
  - Total: 9.26 sq mi (23.99 km^{2})
- Elevation: 1,800 ft (550 m)

Population (2025-01-01)
  - Total: 1,660
  - Density: 179/sq mi (69.2/km^{2})
- Time zone: UTC+1 (CET)
  - Summer (DST): UTC+2 (CEST)

Villamantilla is a municipality of the Community of Madrid, Spain. In 2022 it had a population of 1,567.

It is mostly known because at its head is the only Black mayor of Spain, Juan Antonio de la Morena (for the right-wing Partido Popular), born from a Spanish father and a mother from Equatorial Guinea. He was first elected in 2007 (57.83% for the PP list), and reelected in 2011 (62.64%). His father, uncle and grandfather had already been mayors or vice-mayors of the town, including in Francoist Spain.
