= Navarredonda y San Mamés =

- Municipality
- Coat of arms

- Municipal location within the Community of Madrid.
- Coordinates: 40.9833°N 3.7333°W
- Country: Spain
- Autonomous community: Community of Madrid

Area
  - Land: 10.59 sq mi (27.44 km^{2})

Population (2025-01-01)
  - Total: 163
- Time zone: UTC+1 (CET)
  - Summer (DST): UTC+2 (CEST)

Navarredonda y San Mamés is a municipality of the Community of Madrid, Spain.
