= Prádena del Rincón =

- Municipality
- Flag Coat of arms

- Municipal location within the Community of Madrid.

- Location in Spain
- Coordinates: 41°2′38″N 3°32′24″W
- Country: Spain
- Autonomous community: Community of Madrid

Area
  - Land: 8.68 sq mi (22.48 km^{2})
- Elevation: 3,622 ft (1,104 m)

Population (2025-01-01)
  - Total: 146
  - Density: 16.8/sq mi (6.49/km^{2})
- Time zone: UTC+1 (CET)
  - Summer (DST): UTC+2 (CEST)

Prádena del Rincón is a municipality of the Community of Madrid, Spain.
