= Madarcos =

Coordinates: 41°02′51″N 3°34′56″W

- Municipality
- Flag Coat of arms

- Municipal location within the Community of Madrid.
- Country: Spain
- Autonomous community: Community of Madrid

Population (2025-01-01)
  - Total: 69
- Time zone: UTC+1 (CET)
  - Summer (DST): UTC+2 (CEST)

Madarcos (Spanish: [maˈðaɾkos]) is a municipality of the Community of Madrid, Spain. It has an area of 8.46 km^{2} with a population of 49 inhabitants and a density of 5.79 inhabitants / km^{2} it is the town with the lowest population in the Community of Madrid.

== Geography ==
It borders the municipalities of the Sierra Horcajo north and northwest; Horcajuelo of the Sierra and the Rincon Prádena east; Puentes Viejas south, and Gandullas Piñuécar- west. At its end is the desert of La Nava, in the hamlet of the same name, to the southeast of the town, on the edge of the M-137 that connects Buitrago del Lozoya with Montejo de la Sierra, past the turning Madarcos.
