= Puentes Viejas =

- Municipality
- Flag Coat of arms

- Municipal location within the Community of Madrid.
- Coordinates: 41.0667°N 3.5167°W
- Country: Spain
- Autonomous community: Community of Madrid

Population (2025-01-01)
  - Total: 759
- Time zone: UTC+1 (CET)
  - Summer (DST): UTC+2 (CEST)

Puentes Viejas ("Old Bridges") is a municipality of the Community of Madrid, Spain. In 2022, it had a population of 697.

Puentes Viejas was formed in 1975 by combining three existing municipalities: Manjirón (which absorbed the Cinco Villas municipality in 1850), Paredes de Buitrago and Serrada de la Fuente. The name of the newly created municipality came from the nearby reservoir called Puentes Viejas.
