= Canencia =

- Municipality
- Flag Coat of arms

- Municipal location within the Community of Madrid

- Location in Spain
- Coordinates: 40°54′N 3°44′W
- Country: Spain
- Autonomous community: Community of Madrid

Area
  - Total: 20.3 sq mi (52.7 km^{2})
- Elevation: 3,770 ft (1,150 m)

Population (2025-01-01)
  - Total: 475
- Time zone: UTC+1 (CET)
  - Summer (DST): UTC+2 (CEST)

Canencia (Spanish pronunciation: [kaˈnenθja]) is a municipality of the autonomous community of Madrid in central Spain. It is located in the comarca of Sierra Norte.
