= Berzosa del Lozoya =

- Municipality
- Flag Coat of arms

- Location in Spain
- Coordinates: 40°58′31″N 3°31′28″W
- Country: Spain
- Autonomous community: Madrid
- Province: Madrid

Area
  - Total: 14.3 km^{2} (5.5 sq mi)
- Elevation: 1,094 m (3,589 ft)

Population (2025-01-01)
  - Total: 242
  - Density: 16.9/km^{2} (43.8/sq mi)
- Time zone: UTC+1 (CET)
  - Summer (DST): UTC+2 (CEST)
- Postal code: 28194

Berzosa de Lozoya (Spanish pronunciation: [beɾˈθosa ðe loˈθoʝa]) is a municipality situated in the north of the autonomous community of Madrid in central Spain. It had 234 inhabitants in 2011, covers an area of 14.3 km² and a population density of 16.36people per km².

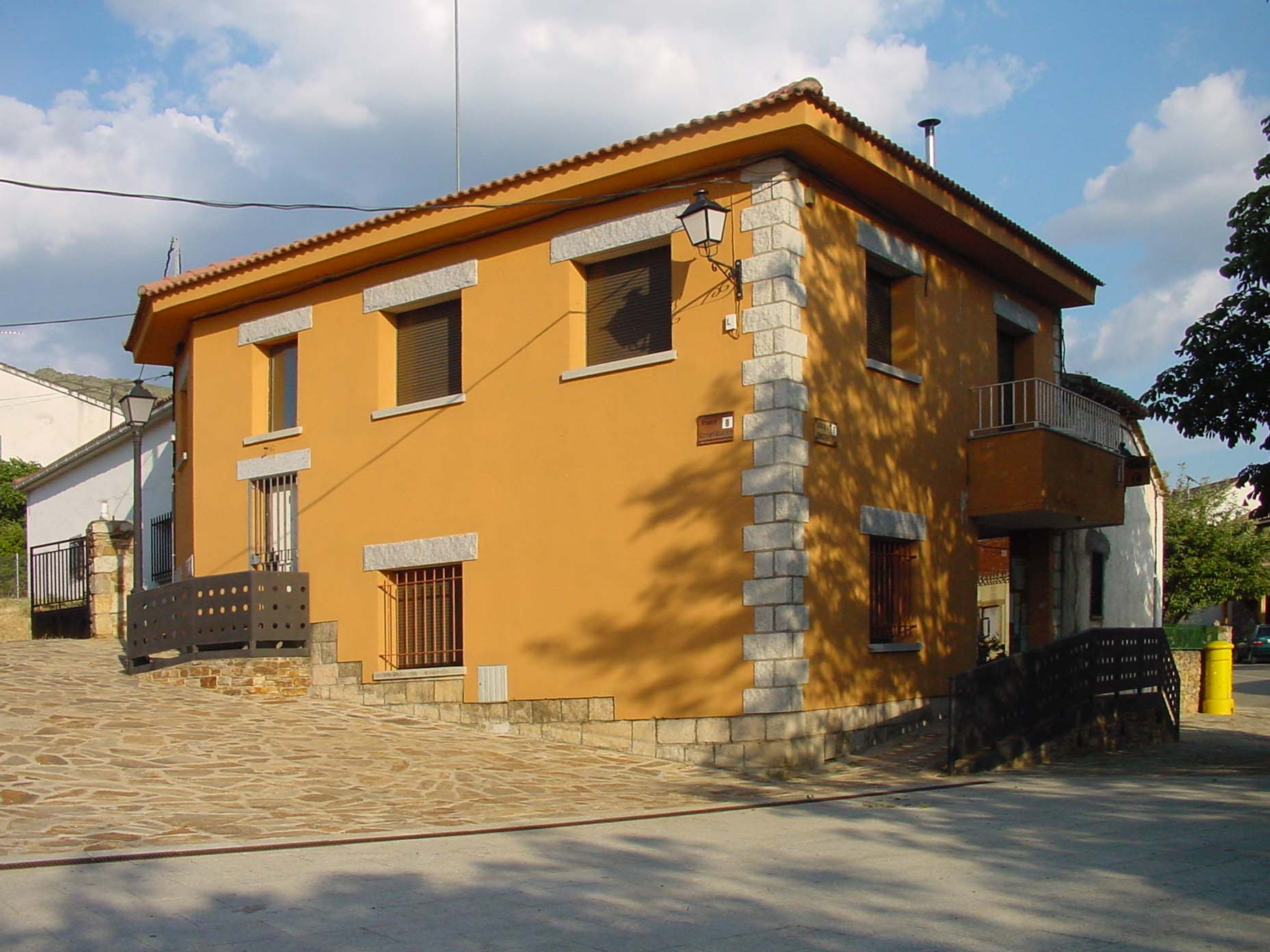
City Hall

== Education ==
There is one nursery (public) in Berzosa del Lozoya.
