= Alameda del Valle =

Coordinates: 40°55′N 3°51′W

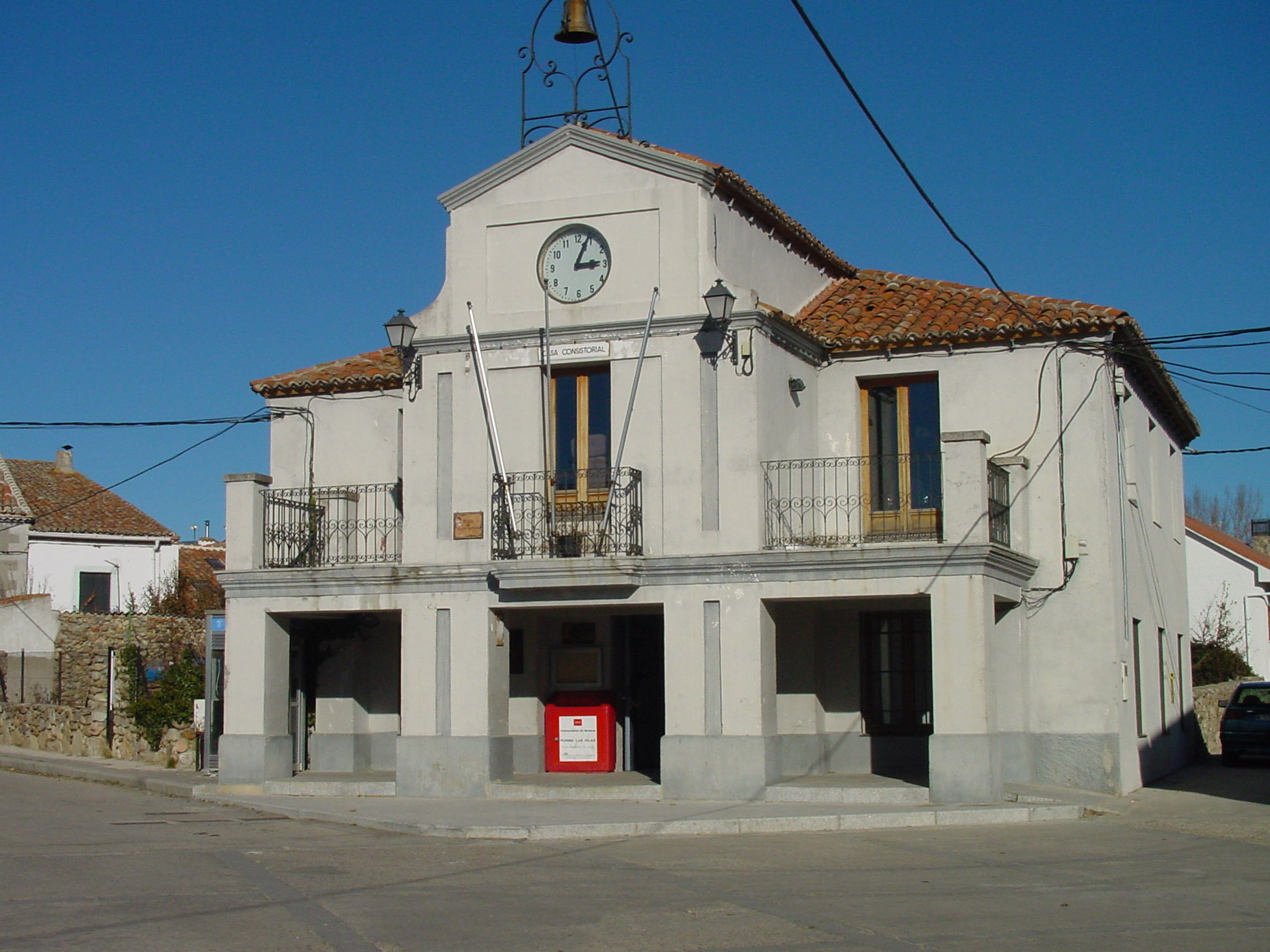
- Municipal office

- Flag Coat of arms

- Location of Alameda del Valle in Madrid

- Location in Spain.
- Country: Spain
- Autonomous community: Madrid

Government
  - Mayor-President: María Elizabeth Crespo Chiabero (PSOE)

Area
  - Total: 25.01 km^{2} (9.66 sq mi)
- Elevation: 1,107 m (3,632 ft)

Population (2025-01-01)
  - Total: 267
  - Density: 10.7/km^{2} (27.7/sq mi)
- Time zone: UTC+1 (CET)
  - Summer (DST): UTC+2 (CEST)
- Website: www.alamedadelvalle

Alameda del Valle is a municipality in Spain, 92 kilometres (57 mi) northeast of Madrid.

== Politics ==
In an unusual reversal of fortunes, the municipality flipped from the PP to PSOE in 2023, the inverse of the regional and national trend.

Party	Votes	%	+/-	Seats	+/-
PSOE	69	43.67	▲0.5	4	▲2
PP	52	32.91	▼16.01	1	▼2
PCAS-TC	29	16.01	New	0	New
Vox	8	5.06	New	0	New
PSOE gain from PP					
