= Villanueva de Perales =

- Municipality
- Flag Coat of arms

- Municipal location within the Community of Madrid.

- Location in Spain
- Coordinates: 40°20′45″N 4°6′6″W
- Country: Spain
- Autonomous community: Community of Madrid

Area
  - Total: 12.04 sq mi (31.18 km^{2})
- Elevation: 1,952 ft (595 m)

Population (2025-01-01)
  - Total: 1,715
  - Density: 142.5/sq mi (55.00/km^{2})
- Time zone: UTC+1 (CET)
  - Summer (DST): UTC+2 (CEST)

Villanueva de Perales is a municipality of the Community of Madrid, Spain. In 2022 it had a population of 1623.
