= Talamanca de Jarama =

- Municipality
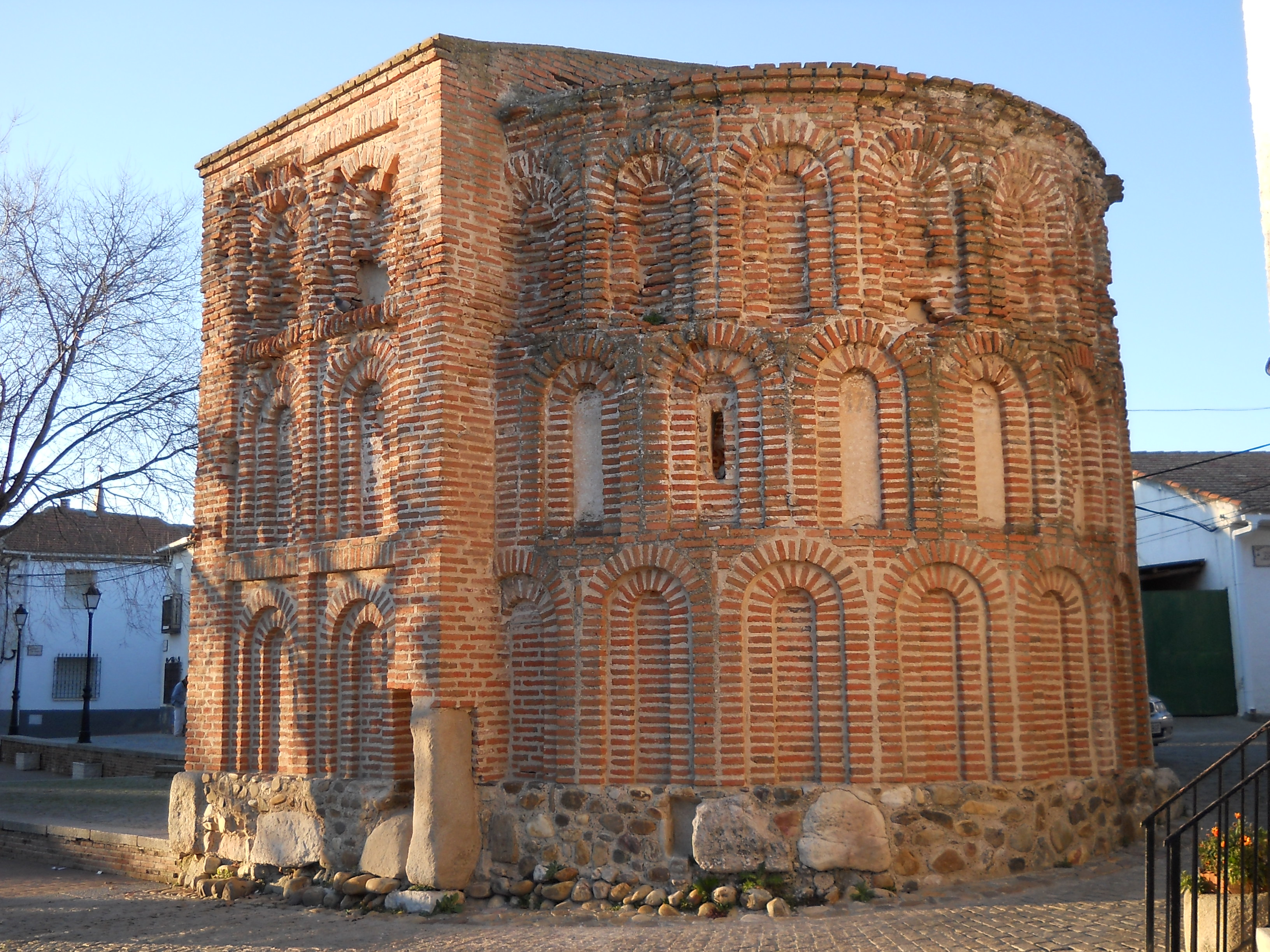
- The Ábside de los Milagros

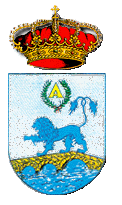
- Coat of arms

- Location in Spain
- Coordinates: 40°44′40″N 3°30′29″W
- Country: Spain
- Autonomous community: Community of Madrid
- Province: Madrid
- Comarca: Cuenca del Medio Jarama; Campiña del Henares

Government
  - Mayor: José Luis Herrero Barbudo

Area
  - Total: 39.36 km^{2} (15.20 sq mi)
- Elevation: 654 m (2,146 ft)

Population (2025-01-01)
  - Total: 4,607
  - Density: 117.0/km^{2} (303.2/sq mi)
- Time zone: UTC+1 (CET)
  - Summer (DST): UTC+2 (CEST)
- Postal code: 28160
- Website: Official website

Talamanca de Jarama is a municipality of the Community of Madrid, Spain. In 2022 it had a population of 4,210.

Sights include the Romanesque church of San Juan Bautista, the a 17th-century Carthusian monastery and the Ábside de los Milagros (also known as El Morabito), what remains of a mid-13th-century church. The ruins of Talamanca are considered a Bien de Interés Cultural of Spain.

== Public transport ==
- 197: Torrelaguna - Madrid (Plaza de Castilla) (ALSA)
- 197 E: Torrelaguna - Valdepiélagos - Talamanca de Jarama

== Twinnings ==
- Talamanca, Costa Rica
