= Valdepiélagos =

Coordinates: 40°46′N 3°28′W

- Municipality
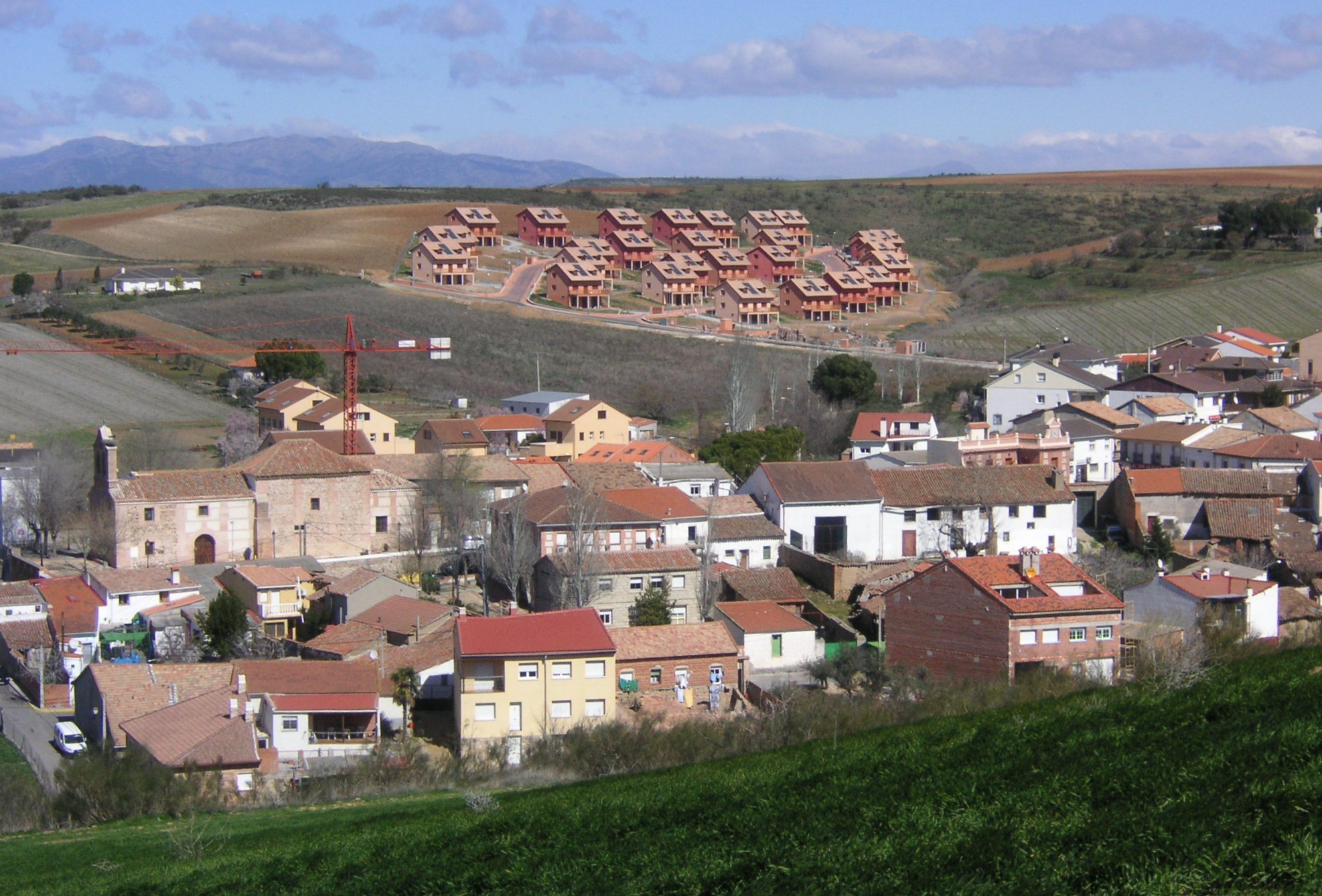
- View of Valdepiélagos

- Coat of arms

- Municipal location within the Community of Madrid.
- Country: Spain
- Autonomous community: Community of Madrid
- Comarca: Campiña Madrileña

Government
  - Mayor: Juan Pablo Herradas Calleja (CIV)

Area
  - Total: 679 sq mi (1,759 km^{2})
  - Land: 679 sq mi (1,759 km^{2})
- Elevation: 2,441 ft (744 m)

Population (2025-01-01)
  - Total: 612
  - Density: 8,410/sq mi (3,246/km^{2})
- Time zone: UTC+1 (CET)
  - Summer (DST): UTC+2 (CEST)
- Postal code: 28170

Valdepiélagos is a municipality of the Community of Madrid, Spain. It received the title of villa (town) on 3 May 1801.

== Etymology ==
The origins of the word Valdepiélagos are obscure, nevertheless linguists and historians have proposed two different versions about this name:

- Valdepiélagos comes from the transposition of val (archaic short form of valle meaning valley), preposition de (of), and piélago (from Latin pelagus, sea), which is a poetic word to name a sea or ocean or, in a figurative sense (as it seems in this case) an abundance of waters. According to this theory, the meaning of Valdepiélagos would be valley of many waters.
- Valdepiélagos was also the place chosen by the ancient residents of nearby Talamanca de Jarama for laying the skins of animals under the sun in order to dry them before they could be further worked on. Thus, the name would consist of val + de + piel (which means skin in Spanish) + lagos (lakes, again in reference to the numerous currents and waters). This explanation is consistent with the local place names in the area, with towns often being named after the trade commodity they produced.

== Location and road access ==
The town of Valdepiélagos is situated on the north-eastern limit of the Community of Madrid, bordering the province of Guadalajara to the north and east, and the municipality of Talamanca de Jarama to the south and west.

Regarding to road access, two motorways traverse the municipality: the M-120 which runs from Mesones to Talamanca de Jarama; and the M-125 running from El Cubillo.

Access from the city of Madrid can be achieved by entering the A-1 motorway heading to Burgos and then taking the Exit 50 to get to the N-320 heading to Guadalajara. Access from Guadalajara itself is made by taking the N-320 in the opposite direction.

The village is connected with some buses of line 197 (Madrid (Plaza de Castilla) - Torrelaguna) and line 197 E (Talamanca de Jarama - Valdepiélagos - Torrelaguna)

== Climate ==
Valdepiélagos' altitude of 744 meters above sea level and its location near the center of the Iberian Peninsula lead to a harsh continental climate yielding hot summers (with mean temperatures around 24 °C and high temperatures above 35 °C) and cold winters with mean temperatures around 5 °C, where chill is present although snow is not abundant. Spring and autumn feature milder temperatures.

Raining season is from spring to autumn, with an average of 530 liters per square meter falling yearly.

== Vegetation ==
Vegetation in Valdepiélagos is diverse and corresponds to the type found in the zone of central Spain with its continental climate:

- Countryside vegetation: mainly thickets, gorse bushes, thyme, rosemary, lavender, bramble...
- Riparian vegetation: predominantly black poplars and willows. Also noteworthy are the elms, and more specifically the remains of a large elm grove which opened at the entrance to the village and that was decimated by DED back in the early 80s.
- Crop vegetation: essentially wheat, olive trees and barley, in that order.

== Economy ==
Valdepiélagos' economy is based upon the following pillars:

- Agriculture: with wheat, olives and barley being grown.
- Animal husbandry: declining in the last years, today only a single flock of sheep remains.
- Trade: with consumer goods businesses like a bakery, a butcher shop, an automobile workshop, supermarkets, bars...
- Other: for example construction or SMEs.

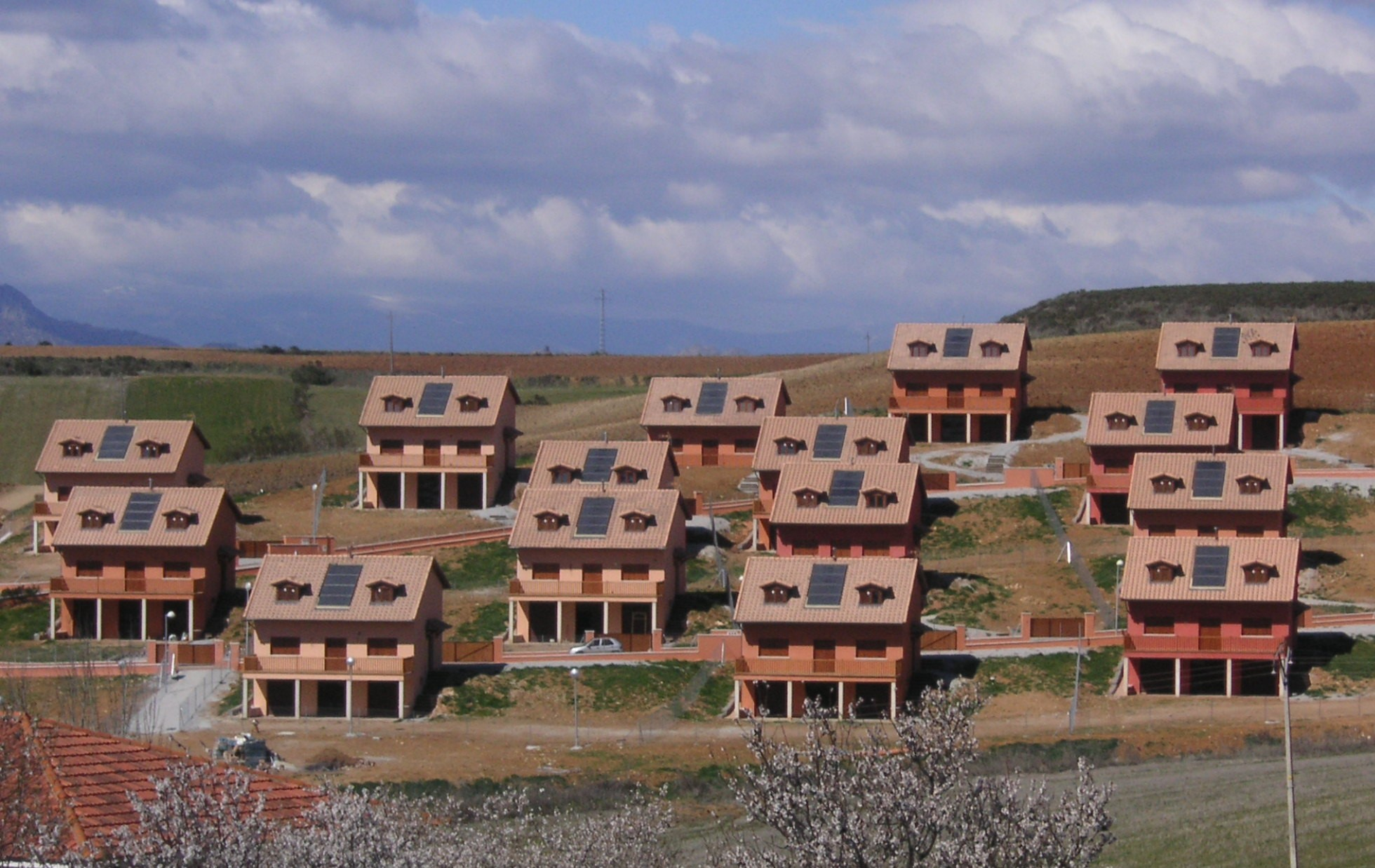
View of part of the Ecoaldea in Valdepiélagos.
