= Corpa =

Coordinates: 40°26′N 3°16′W

- Municipality
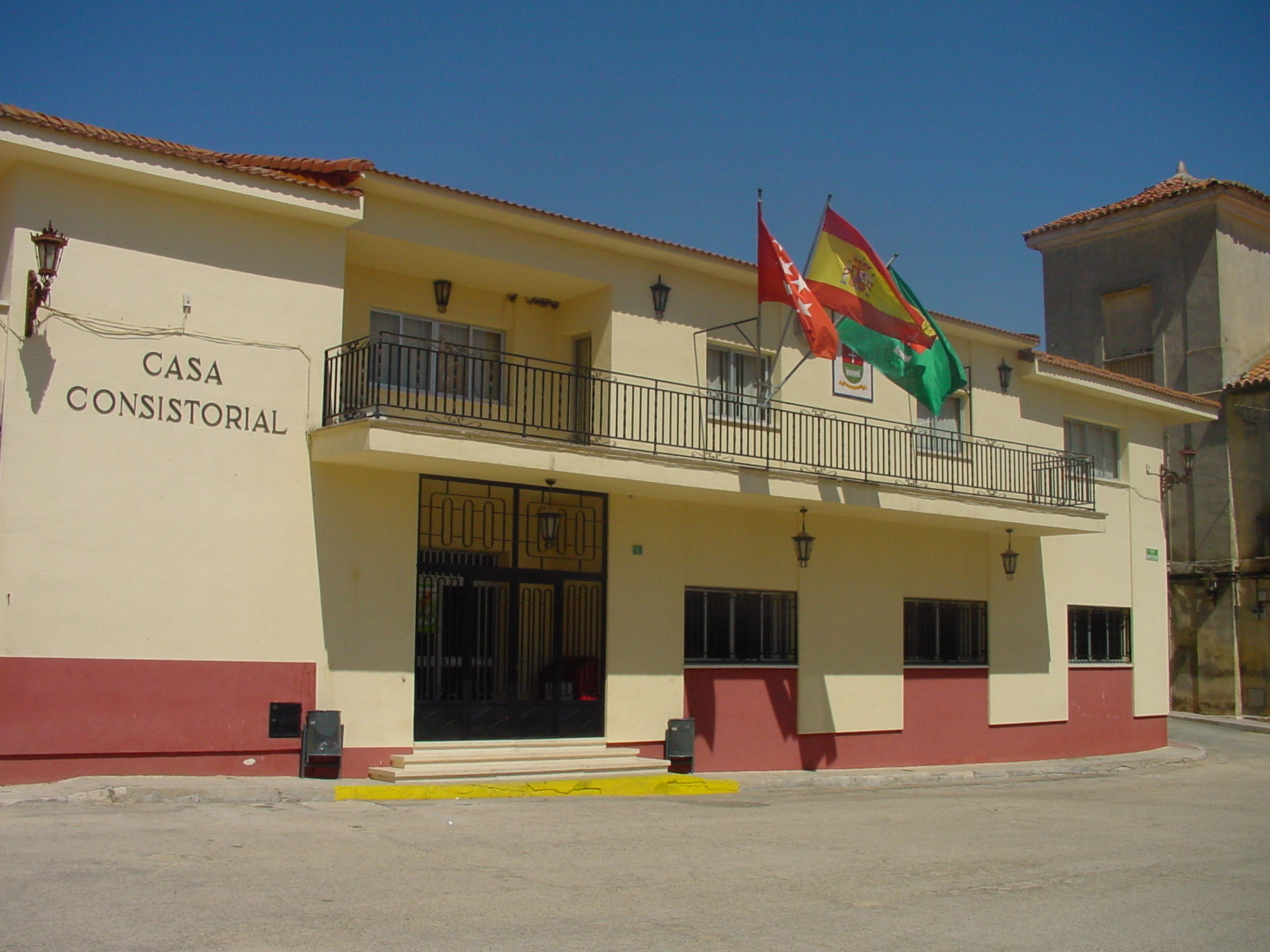

- Flag Coat of arms

- Municipal location within the Community of Madrid.

- Location in Spain
- Country: Spain
- Autonomous community: Community of Madrid

Area
  - Total: 10.00 sq mi (25.91 km^{2})
- Elevation: 2,820 ft (860 m)

Population (2025-01-01)
  - Total: 832
  - Density: 83.2/sq mi (32.1/km^{2})
- Time zone: UTC+1 (CET)
  - Summer (DST): UTC+2 (CEST)
- Postal code: 28811

Corpa is a municipality of the autonomous community of Madrid in central Spain. It belongs to the comarca of Alcalá.
