= Batres =

Coordinates: 40°13′N 3°55′W

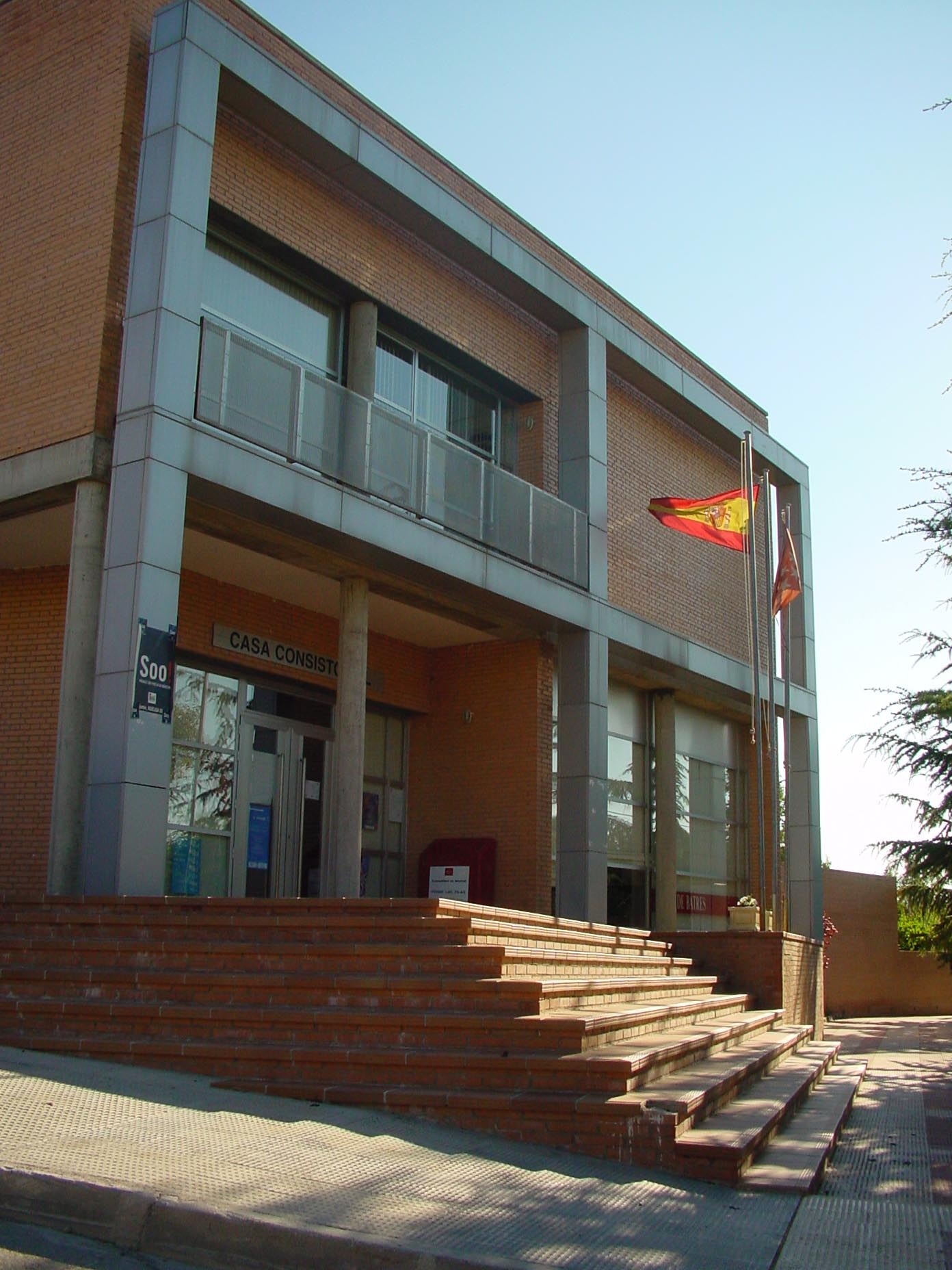
- City hall

- Flag Coat of arms

- Location of Batres in Madrid

- Location in Spain.
- Country: Spain
- Autonomous community: Madrid

Area
  - Total: 21.58 km^{2} (8.33 sq mi)
- Elevation: 601 m (1,972 ft)

Population (2025-01-01)
  - Total: 1,976
  - Density: 91.57/km^{2} (237.2/sq mi)
- Time zone: UTC+1 (CET)
  - Summer (DST): UTC+2 (CEST)
- Website: www.batres.es

Batres (Spanish pronunciation: [ˈbatɾes]) is a small town and municipality in the autonomous community of Madrid in central Spain. The town as is known today was founded in the 12th century after it was recaptured by Christians from the Almoravids, or north African settlers.

== Tourism ==
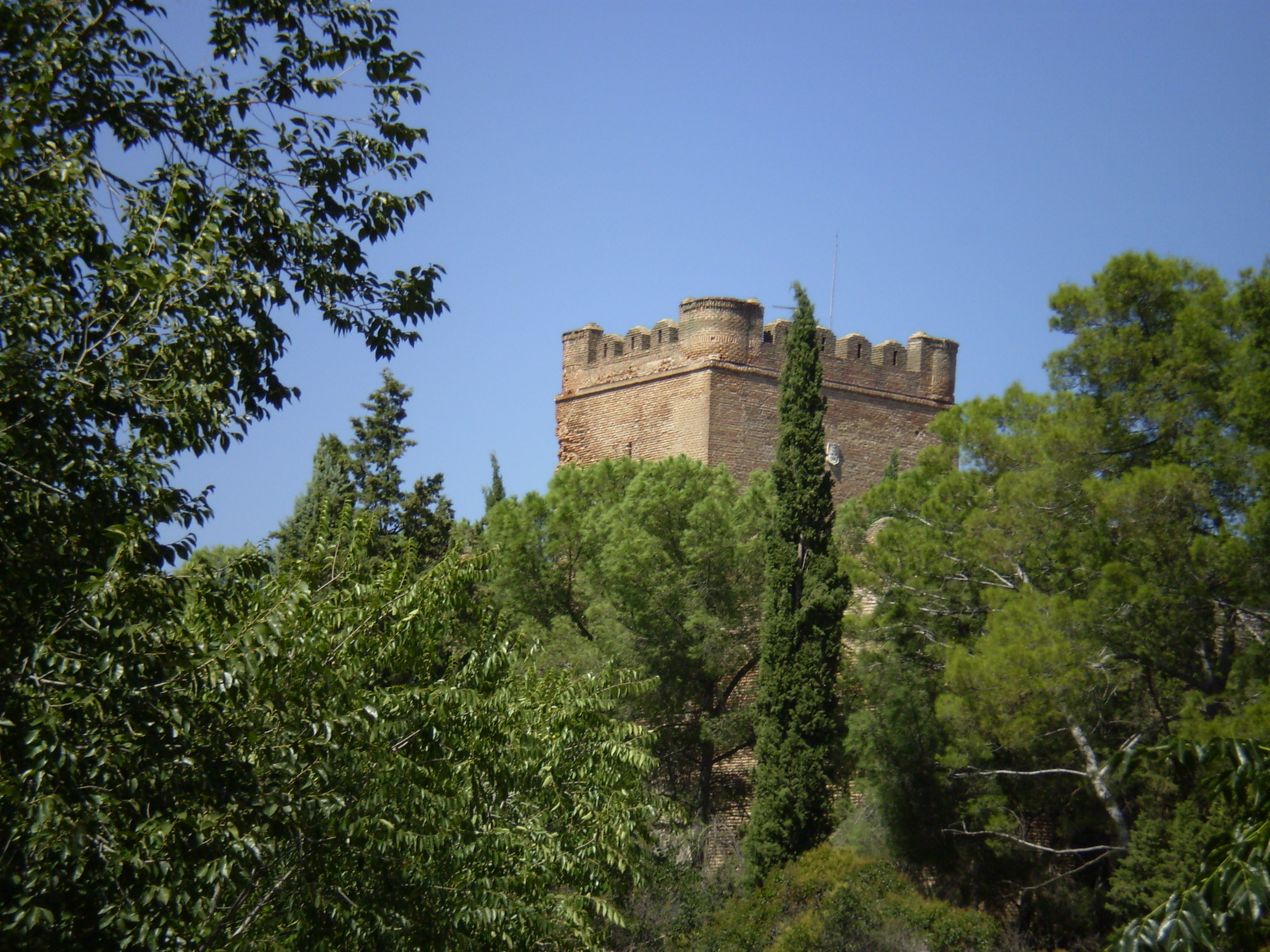
Batres Castle-Castillo de Batres

The town is a popular destination because of Batres Castle, which is the main tourist attraction.
