= Pinilla del Valle =

Coordinates: 40°55′N 3°49′W

- Municipality
- Flag Coat of arms

- Municipal location within the Community of Madrid.
- Country: Spain
- Autonomous community: Community of Madrid
- Elevation: 3,586 ft (1,093 m)

Population (2025-01-01)
  - Total: 200
- Time zone: UTC+1 (CET)
  - Summer (DST): UTC+2 (CEST)

Pinilla del Valle is a municipality of the Community of Madrid, Spain.
