= Griñón =

- Municipality
- Griñón City Council

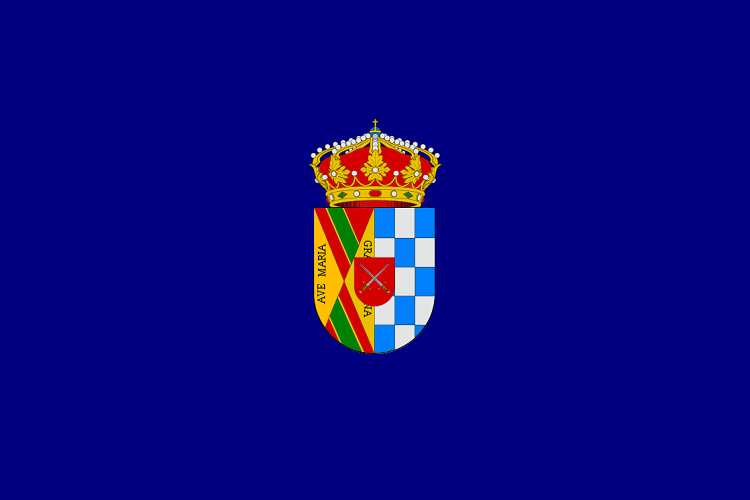
- Flag Coat of arms

- Location in Spain Griñón (Community of Madrid)
- Coordinates: 40°13′N 3°51′W
- Country: Spain
- Autonomous community: Madrid

Population (2025-01-01)
  - Total: 10,799
- Time zone: UTC+1 (CET)
  - Summer (DST): UTC+2 (CEST)

Griñón (Spanish pronunciation: [ɡɾiˈɲon]) is a municipality of the Community of Madrid, Spain. According to the 2025 census (INE), the municipality had a population of 10,799 inhabitants.

== Gallery ==
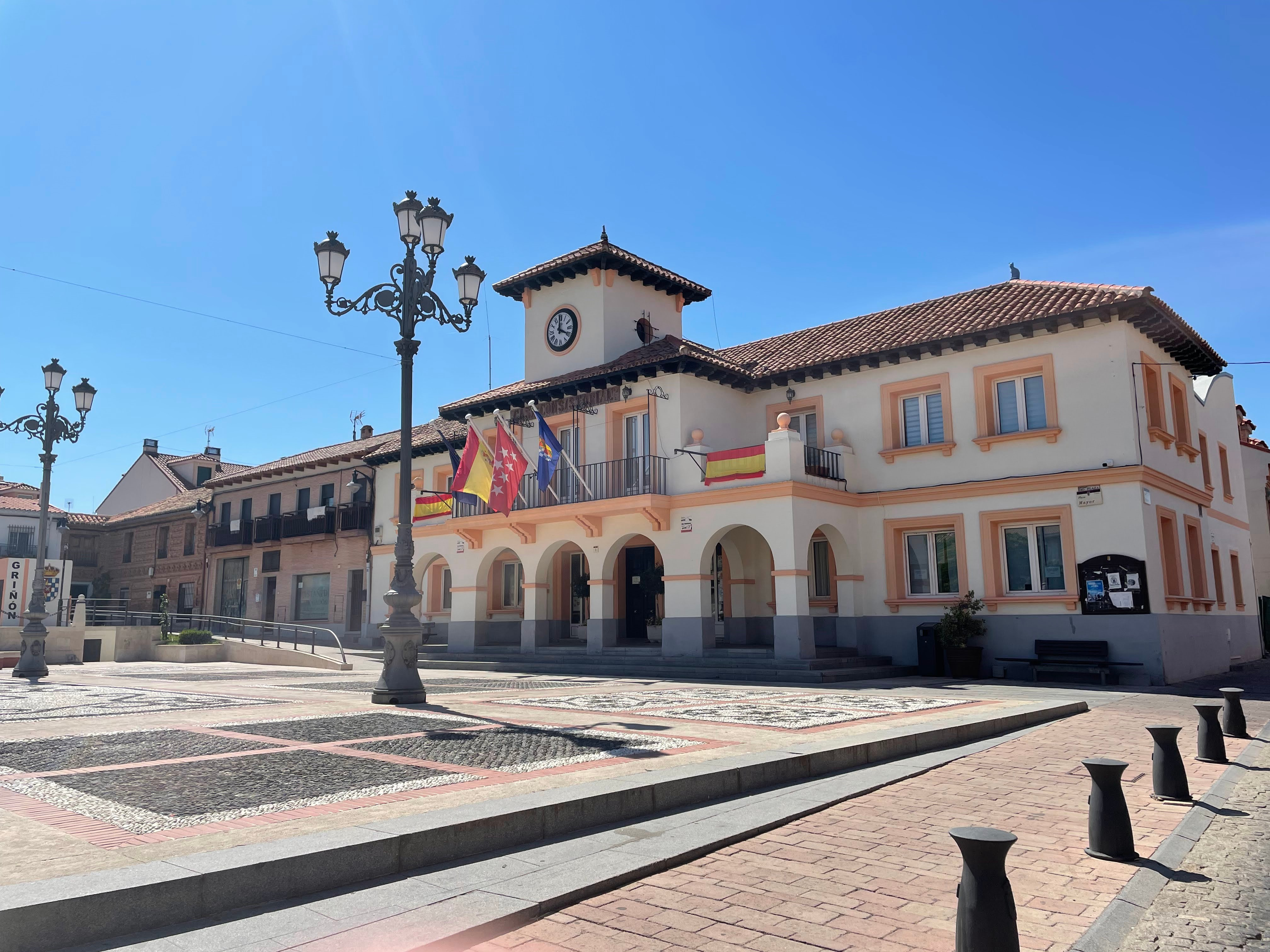
Griñón City Hall

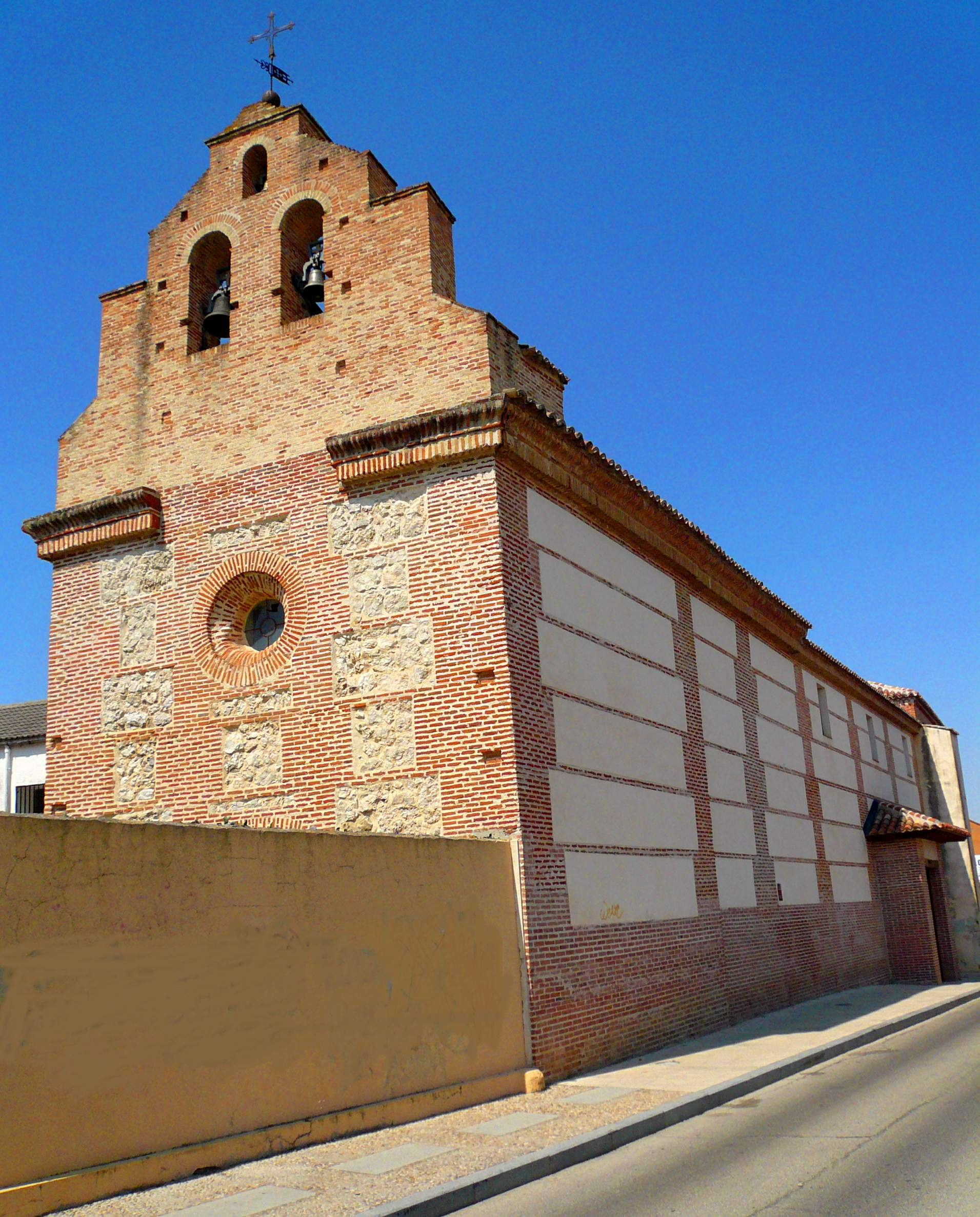
Church of the Asunción de Nuestra Señora

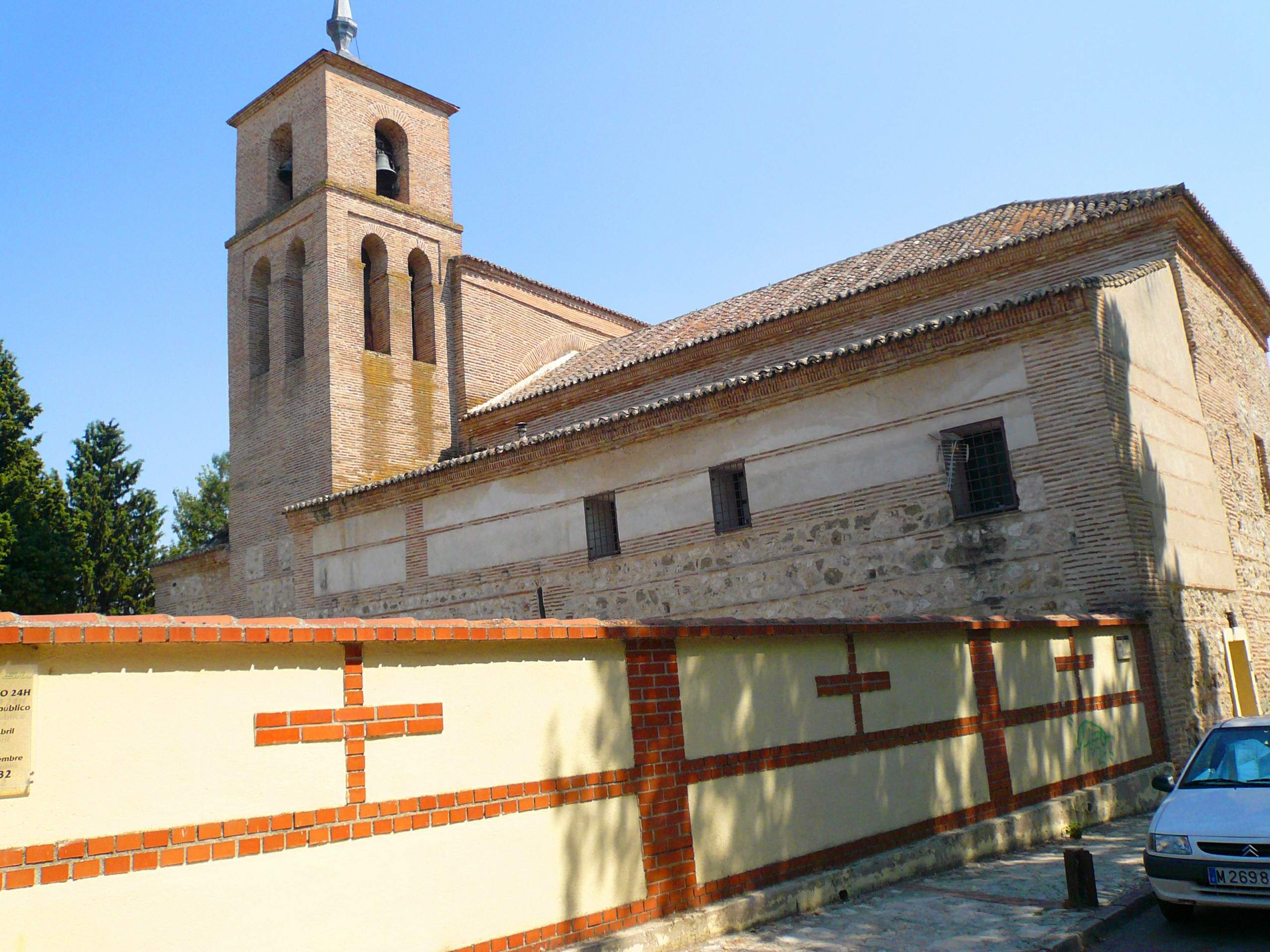
Convento de Clarisas de la Encarnación

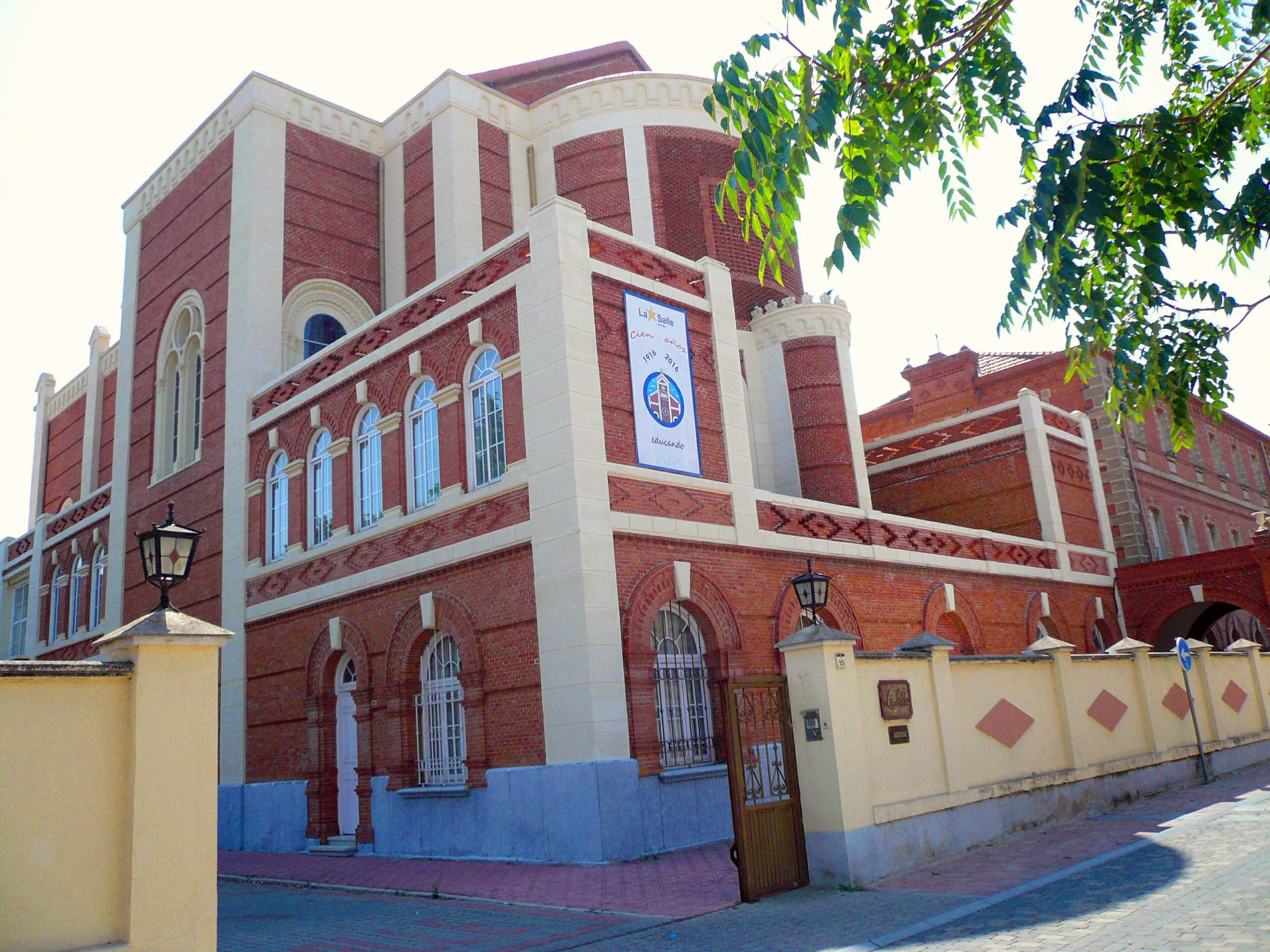
School La Salle

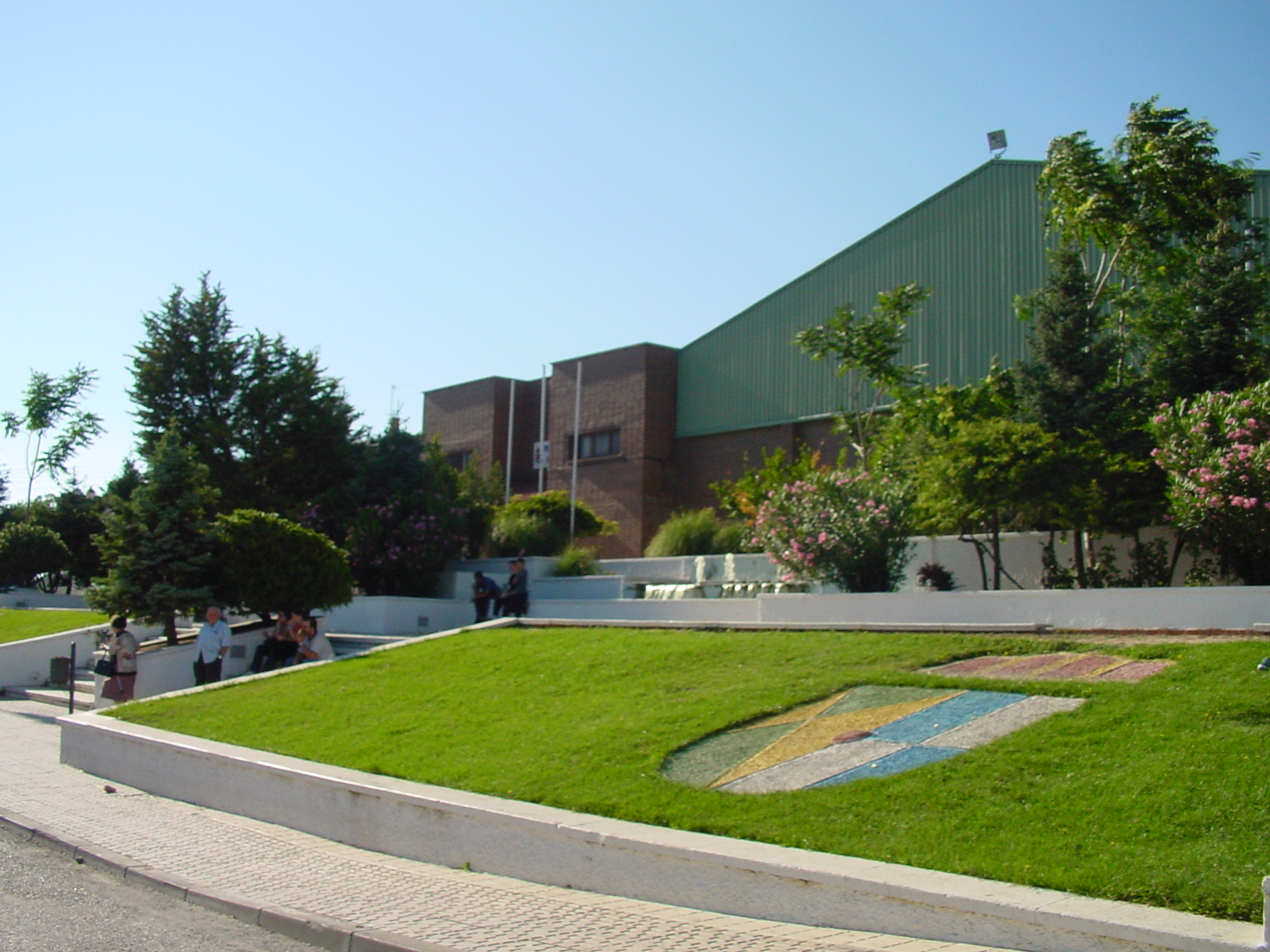
Griñón Municipal Theater
