= Morata de Tajuña =

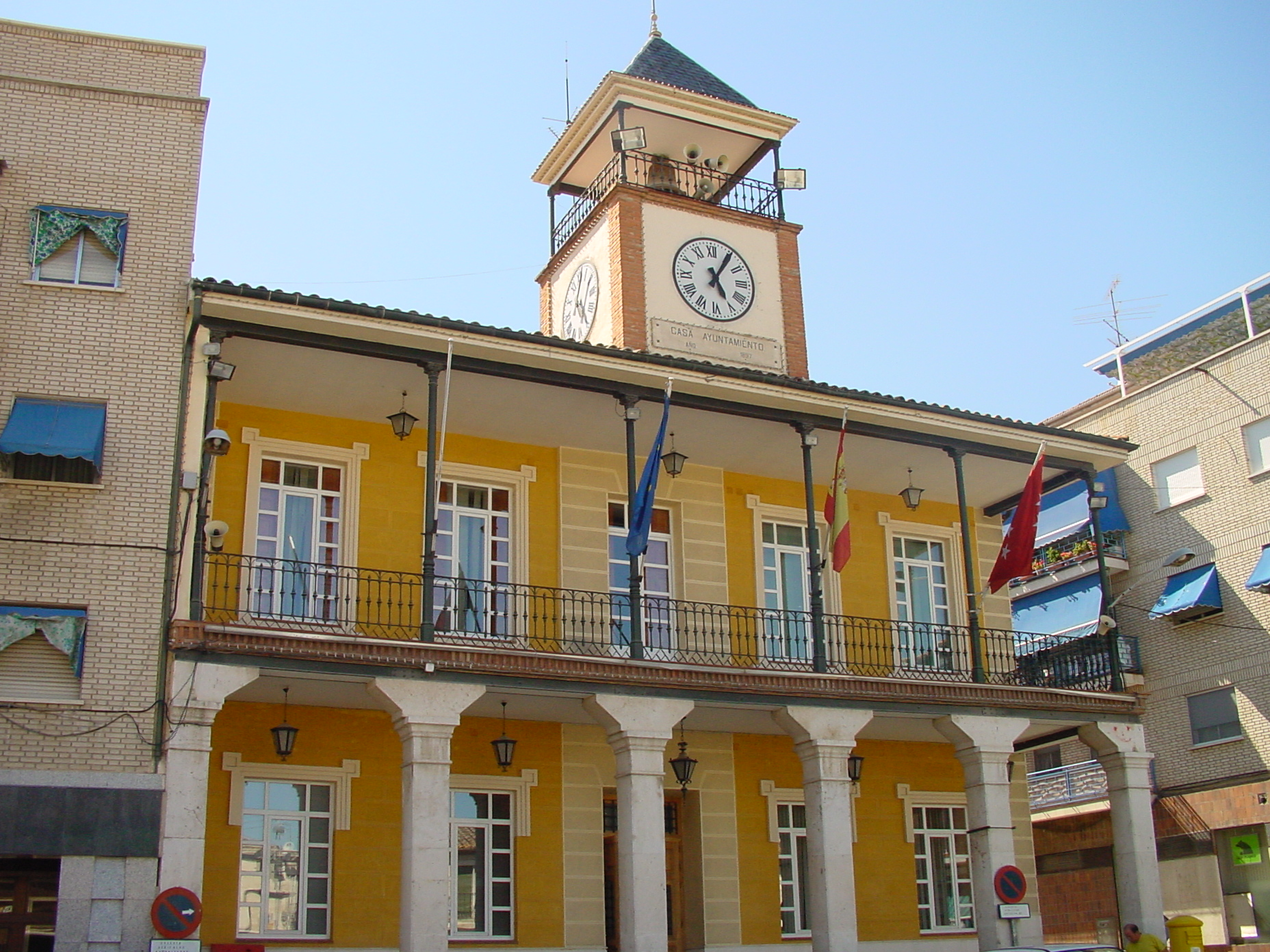
- Town hall

- Coat of arms

- Location in Spain
- Coordinates: 40°13′46″N 3°26′11″W
- Country: Spain
- Autonomous community: Community of Madrid
- Province: Madrid
- Comarca: Comarca de Las Vegas

Government
  - Mayor: Valentin Mariano Franco

Area
  - Total: 1.7 sq mi (4.3 km^{2})
- Elevation: 1,762 ft (537 m)

Population (2025-01-01)
  - Total: 8,397
  - Density: 5,100/sq mi (2,000/km^{2})
- Time zone: UTC+1 (CET)
  - Summer (DST): UTC+2 (CEST)
- Postal code: 28530
- Website: Official website

Morata de Tajuña is a municipality of the Community of Madrid, Spain.
