= Villarejo de Salvanés =

Coordinates: 40°11′N 3°19′W

- Municipality
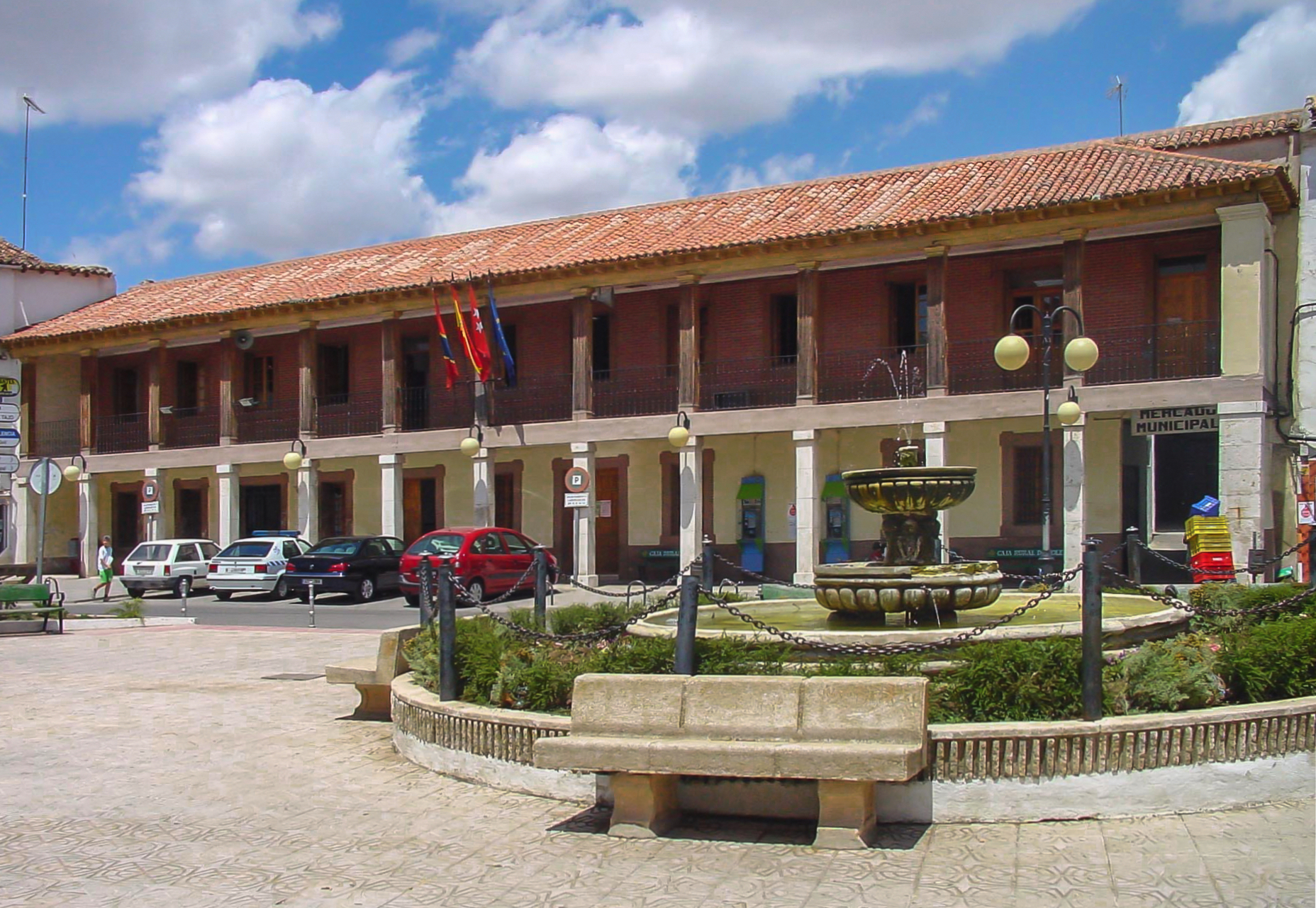
- The city hall

- Flag Coat of arms

- Municipal location within the Community of Madrid.
- Country: Spain
- Autonomous community: Community of Madrid

Area
  - Total: 45.8 sq mi (118.6 km^{2})
- Elevation: 2,490 ft (759 m)

Population (2025-01-01)
  - Total: 8,042
  - Density: 175.6/sq mi (67.81/km^{2})
- Time zone: UTC+1 (CET)
  - Summer (DST): UTC+2 (CEST)

Villarejo de Salvanés is a municipality of Spain. Located in Comunidad de Madrid. The municipal territory, situated in the comarca of Las Vegas and the historical region of the Alcarria de Chinchón, has a population of 7,900 inhabitants (INE 2024). It belongs to the Diocese of Alcalá de Henares and the judicial district of Arganda del Rey. Its patroness is Our Lady of Victory of Lepanto, and its patron is Saint Andrew the Apostle. The municipality covers a vast area of 118.6 km², which includes four other sections: Las Huertas de Villarejo, Buena Mesón, La Varga, and Vega Corbera.
