= Autovía M-501 =

Highway in Madrid, Spain

Autopista M-501
- Autovía de los Pantanos; Carretera de los Pantanos
- Map of the M-501

Route information
- Maintained by the regional government of the Community of Madrid
- Length: 72.780 km (45.223 mi)

Major junctions
- From: M-40/M-511 (Alcorcón)
- To: CL-501 (border with Ávila)

Location
- Country: Spain

Highway system
- Highways in Spain; Autopistas and autovías; National Roads

The M-501 is a road in the Spanish region of Madrid. Managed by the Madrid regional government as a primary road in the regional network, it comprises a motorway-grade (autovía) section (from Alcorcón to Navas del Rey) and a two-lane road section (from Navas del Rey to the border with the province of Ávila).

== Names ==
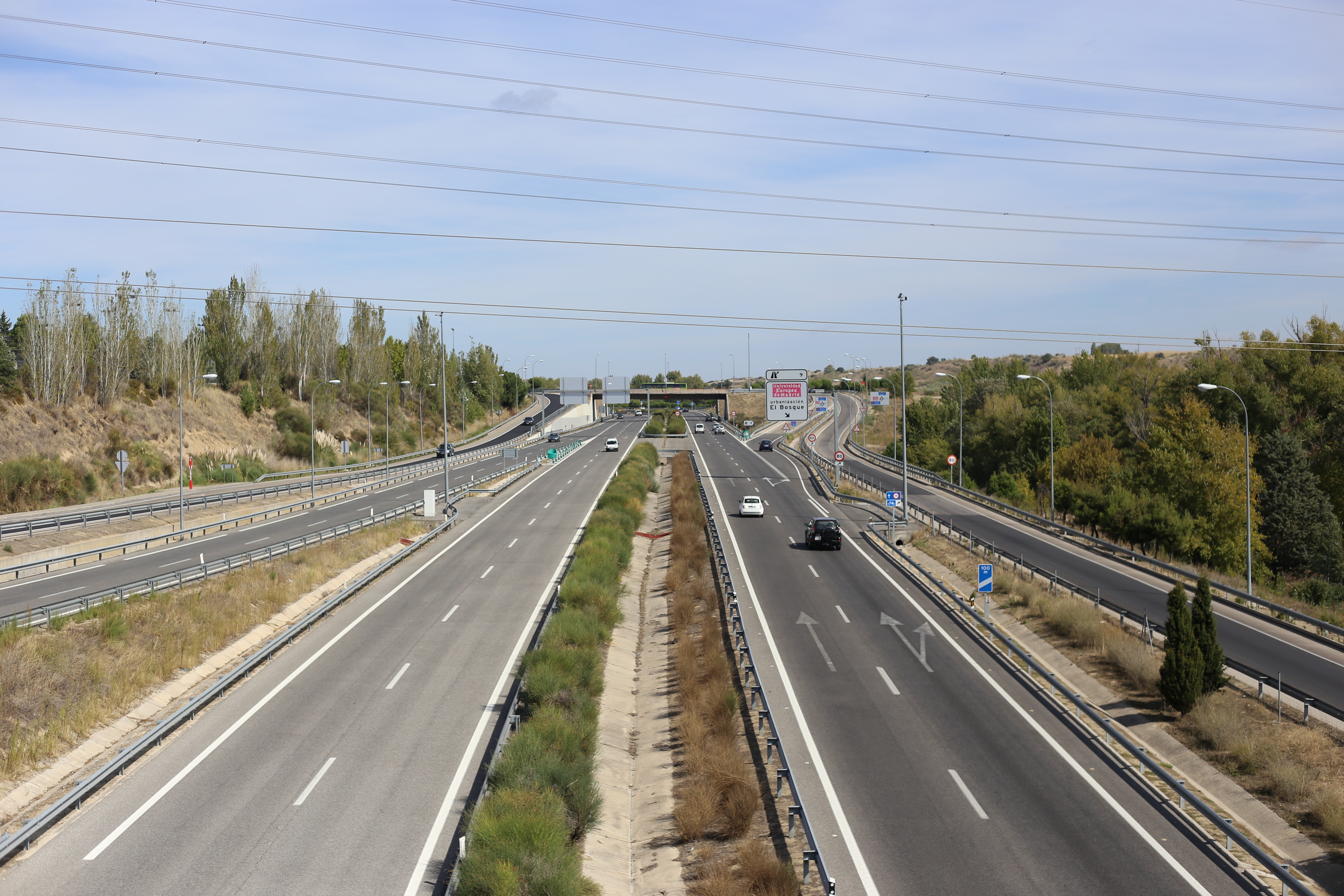
The M-501 near Villaviciosa de Odón.

It is named after the old comarcal road C-501 that connected the cities of Alcorcón (near Madrid) and Plasencia (in Extremadura), which was split in three parts and transferred to the relevant autonomous communities. The several dams and reservoirs in the route of the road made the M-501 stuck to the name of Reservoir Road (Sp. Carretera de los Pantanos).

== Course ==
Its total length is 72.780 km.

The M-501 begins at the intersection of the M-40 beltway and the M-511 dual carriageway near Pozuelo de Alarcón and Boadilla del Monte. It borders the latter town, intersecting the M-50 beltway and is later joined by the M-506 near Villaviciosa de Odón and the European University of Madrid. It then crosses the future highway M-600 south of Brunete and continues west to Chapinería and Navas del Rey, where the autovía stretch ends at a roundabout. The M-501 continues as two-lane road to with the province of Ávila.
