= Transport in Madrid =

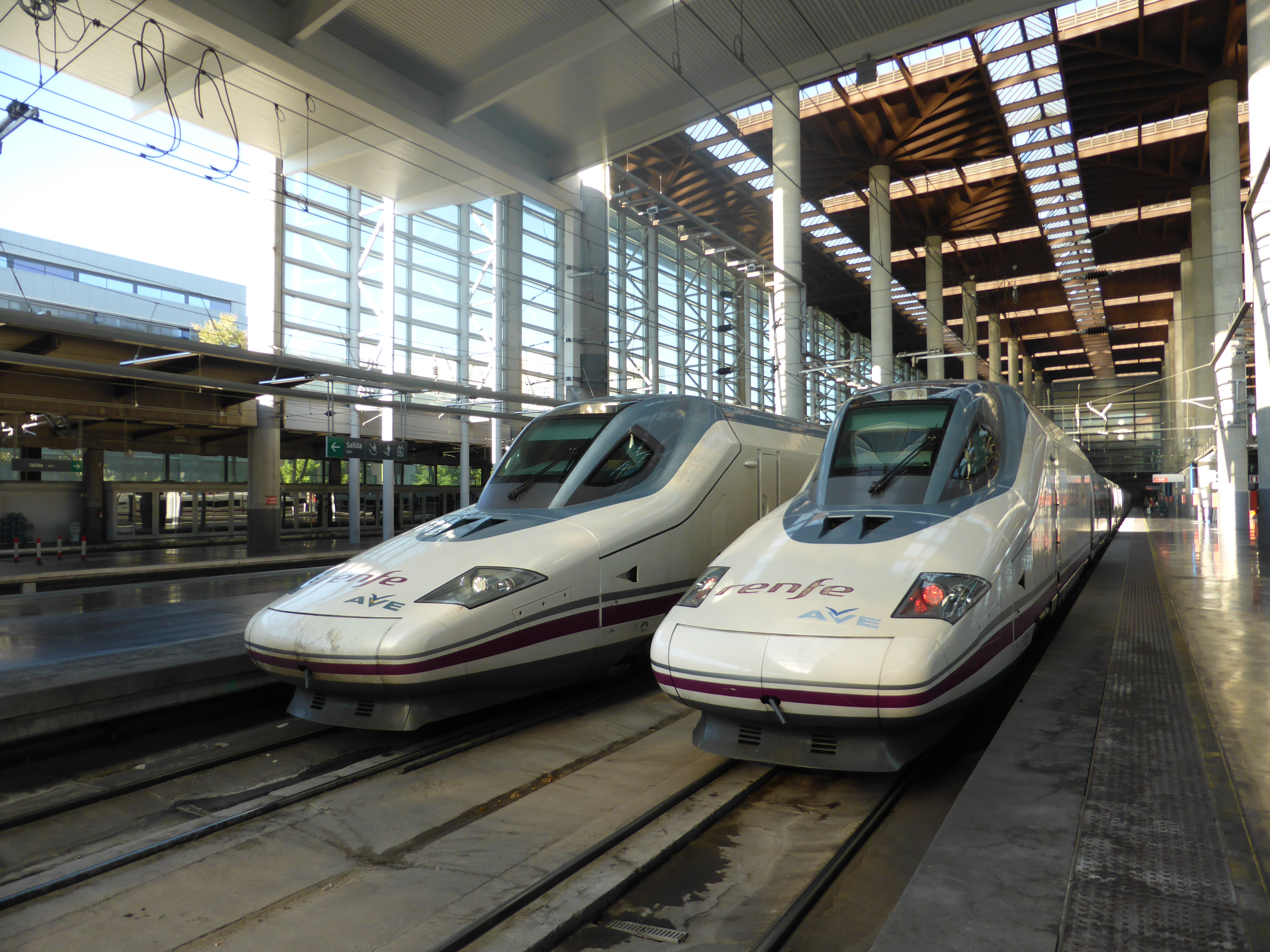
AVE Trains in the Madrid Atocha railway station

Madrid is served by highly developed transport infrastructure. Road, rail and air links are vital to maintain the economic position of Madrid as a leading centre of employment, enterprise, trade and tourism, providing effective connections with not only other parts of the region, but also the rest of Spain and Europe as a whole. Three quarters of a million people commute into the city to work, and these and other local travellers have available a high-capacity metropolitan road network and a well-used public transport system based on the Metro, the Cercanías local railways, and a dense network of bus routes.

In terms of longer-distance transport, Madrid is the central node of the system of autovías and of the high-speed rail network (AVE), which has brought major cities such as Seville and Barcelona within 2.5 hours travel time. Madrid is also home to the Madrid-Barajas Airport, the fourth largest airport in Europe. Madrid's location at the centre of the peninsula makes it a major logistical base.

== Local transport ==
744,000 of the jobs in the city are held by residents of other municipalities, while 242,000 residents in the capital have jobs outside. Thus passenger flows are predominantly into and out of the city centre, although further decentralisation of economic activity to the outskirts is altering this pattern.

From the point of view of sustainable transport, Madrid has performed well from the compactness of the city centre and middle-to-high-density peripheral nuclei, favouring public transport and pedestrian movement. The weak points appear in the "new peripheries", with low-density residential developments and dispersal of journey destinations, leading to higher car use.

=== Road ===
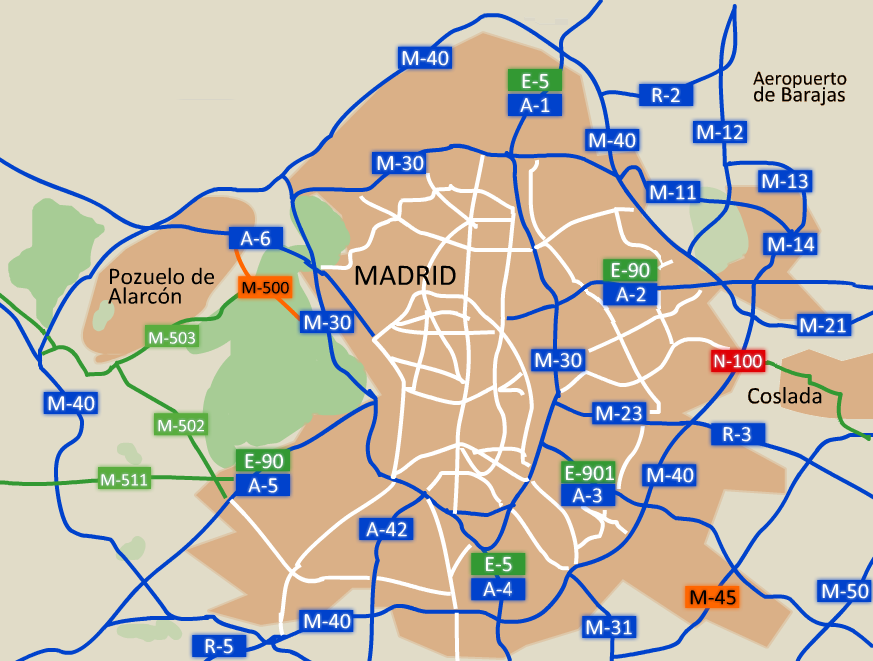
Madrid's motorway hub network

The outward expansion of Madrid after 1960 was supported by a growing network of radial roads. Above all these enabled commuter movements to the city centre. It also became necessary to create the first orbital autovía, the M30, which was intended to facilitate the passage of long-distance traffic, but became invaded by local traffic. The scheme implemented at the end of the 1980s consisted of nine radial autovías (those toward Burgos, Barcelona, Valencia, Andalucía, Toledo, Fuenlabrada, Extremadura, A Coruña and Colmenar Viejo) but just the one orbital route – the M-30. Three further orbital routes, each at a greater distance from the centre, were added in the 1990s and 2000s. These are designated M40, M45 and M50.

The most recent big scheme was improvement of the M30. This road is the inner ring motorway of Madrid. Significant portions of M30 run underground and its urban motorway tunnels have sections of more than 6 km (3.73 mi) in length and 3 to 6 lanes in each direction. Between the south entry of the Avenida de Portugal tunnel and the north exit of the M-30 south by-pass there are close to 10 km (6.21 mi) of continuous tunnels. M40 is a ring motorway which borders Madrid at a mean distance of 10.07 kilometres (6.26 mi) and it has a total length of 63.3 km (39.33 mi). M45 is a partial ring around the city serving the metropolitan area of Madrid. It was built to help alleviate the congestion of the M40 from the southern to the north-eastern, runs between the M40 and the M50 where the two ring motorways are more separated. M50 is the outer of the Madrid orbital motorways and has a total length of 85 km (52.82 mi). It services mainly the metropolitan area at a mean distance of 13.5 km (8.39 mi).

The most important radial autovías of Madrid are:

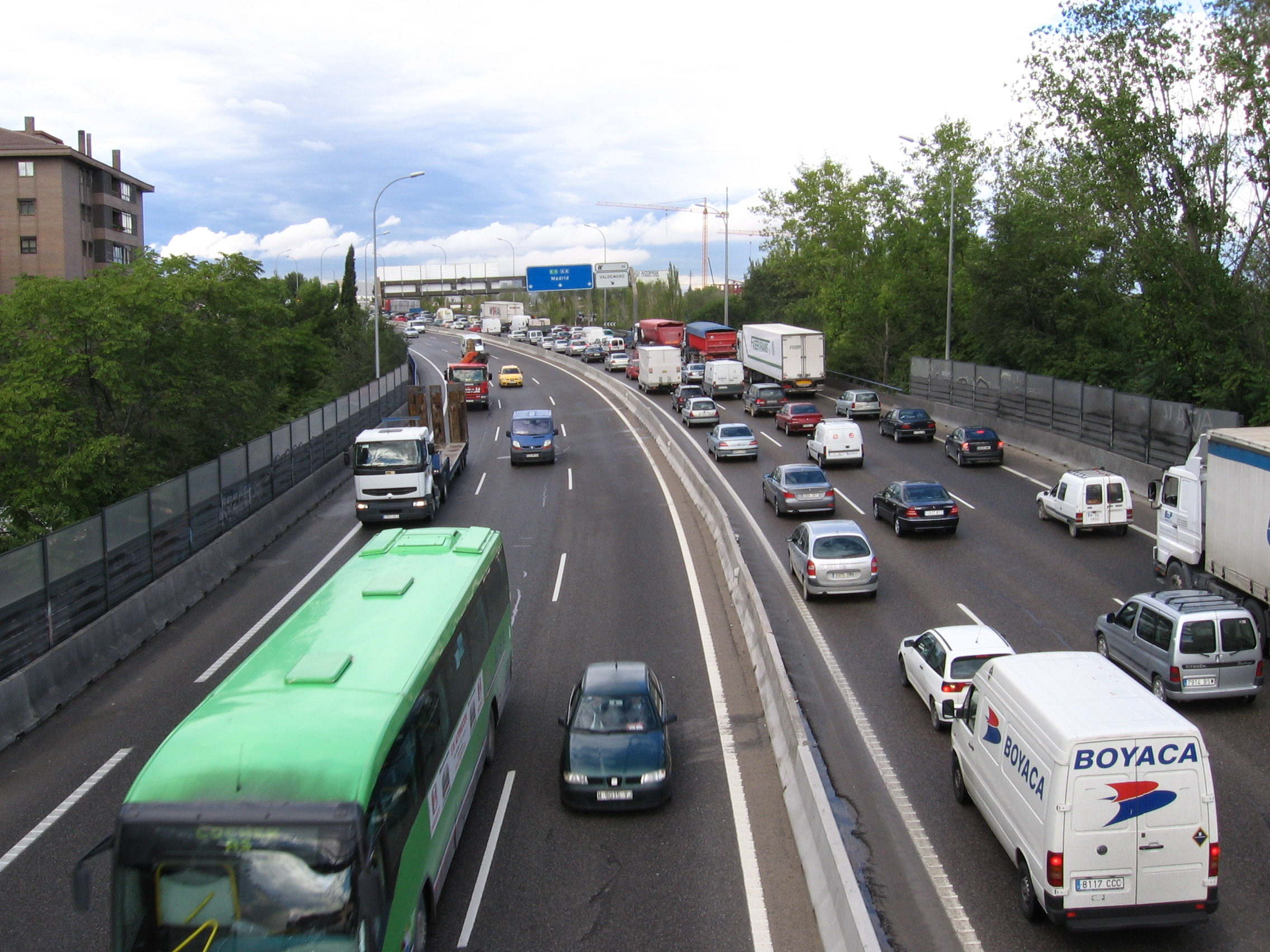
Autovía A4, Spain

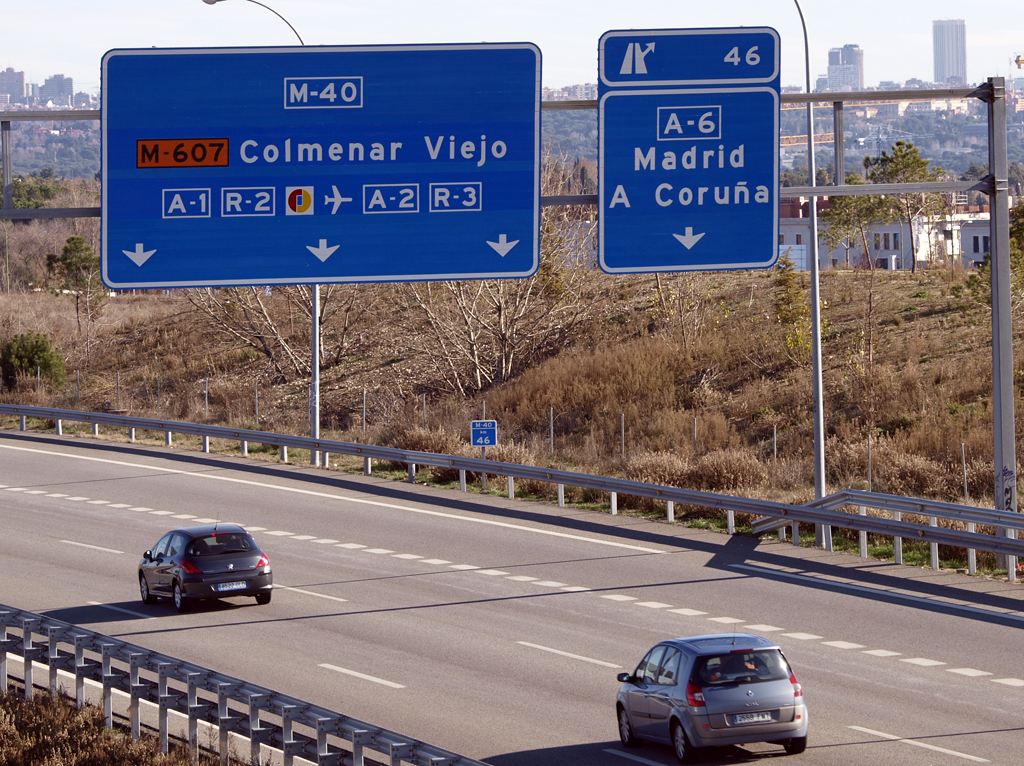
M-40 kilometer 46

Signal	Denomination	Itinerary
A-1	Autovía del Norte	Madrid – Aranda de Duero – Burgos – Miranda de Ebro – Vitoria – San Sebastián
A-2	Autovía del Nordeste	Madrid – Guadalajara – Zaragoza – Lleida – Barcelona
A-3	Autovía del Este	Madrid – Valencia
A-4	Autovía del Sur	Madrid – Córdoba – Sevilla – Jerez – Cádiz
A-5	Autovía del Suroeste	Madrid – Talavera de la Reina – Navalmoral de la Mata – Mérida – Badajoz – Portugal
A-6	Autovía del Noroeste	Madrid – Medina del Campo – Benavente – Astorga – Ponferrada – Lugo – A Coruña
A-42	Autovía de Toledo	Madrid – Illescas – Toledo

More recently, four new radial tolled autopistas (named R-n instead of A-n), listed below, form a new mode of access to the capital, merging with their autovía counterparts further from Madrid. The main advantage to these roads is that they allow true fast travel from the first kilometer. These, however, have frequently been under-utilised, especially after the economic crisis of 2008.

Signal	Denomination	Itinerary
R-2	Autopista Radial 2	Madrid (M-40)—M-50—Guadalajara (A-2)
R-3	Autopista Radial 3	Madrid (M-30)—Arganda del Rey (A-3)
R-4	Autopista Radial 4	Madrid (M-50)—Aranjuez—Ocaña (A-4/A-40/AP-36)
R-5	Autopista Radial 5	Madrid (M-40)—Navalcarnero (A-5)
M-12	Eje aeropuerto	Madrid (M-40)—M-11—Airport terminal 4—A-1

The investment in roads has resulted in a high-capacity metropolitan road network, facilitating communications between the outer municipalities, and resilient against closures due to works or accidents. However, the new orbital roads have favoured the dispersion and fragmentation of residential areas and areas of economic activity, resulting in an array of urban developments separate from each other, and very dependent on private vehicles.

In 2018, Madrilenian roads were the safest in all of Spain with only 18 traffic fatalities per million inhabitants.

=== Public transport ===
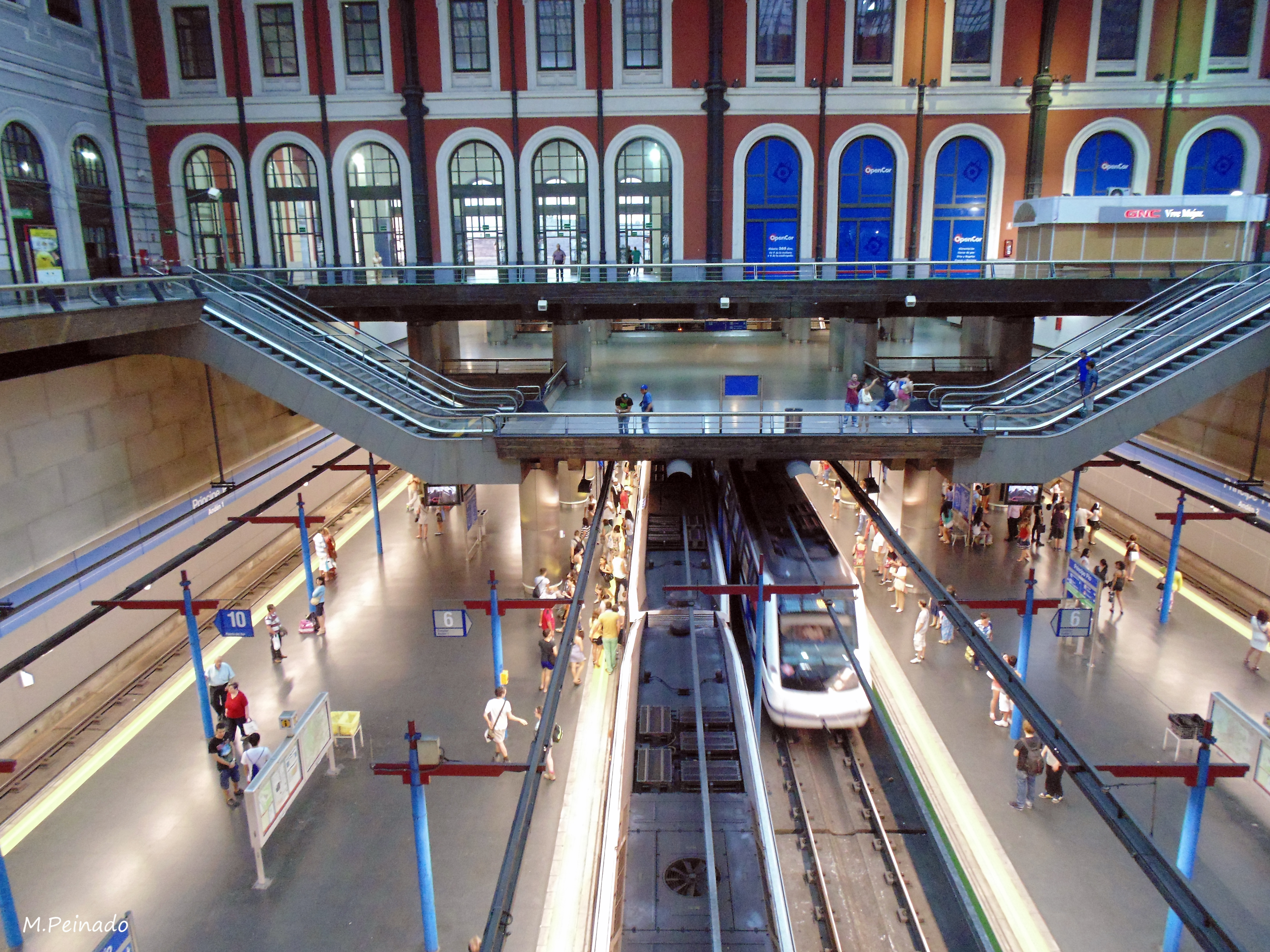
Rapid transit in the Príncipe Pío transport hub

Madrid has built up a public transport system, the fruit of long-term policies supporting the extension of the metro and Cercanías networks, the improvement of bus networks, the construction of 28 transport interchanges, and subsidies to public transport.

A mobility survey in 2004 counted 14.5M journeys per day in the region, of which 10.0M were mechanised. 48.6% of the latter took place entirely within the city, 22.5% started or finished in the city, and 28.9% were entirely outside the city. Public transport was used for 69.1% of journeys within the central area, down to 27.3% in the outer periphery (corona regional). Metro accounted for 40% of journeys by public transport, bus 30%, interurban buses 10%, and Cercanías 10%. More recent figures, for 2013, show passengers carried annually by bus 404M, Metro 563M, Cercanías 153M. The inner city relies for transport mainly on the Metro and the EMT bus service. As regards the periphery, public transport is based above all on the Cercanías and interurban buses. The metro, too, is extending into parts of the outer area.

==== Buses ====
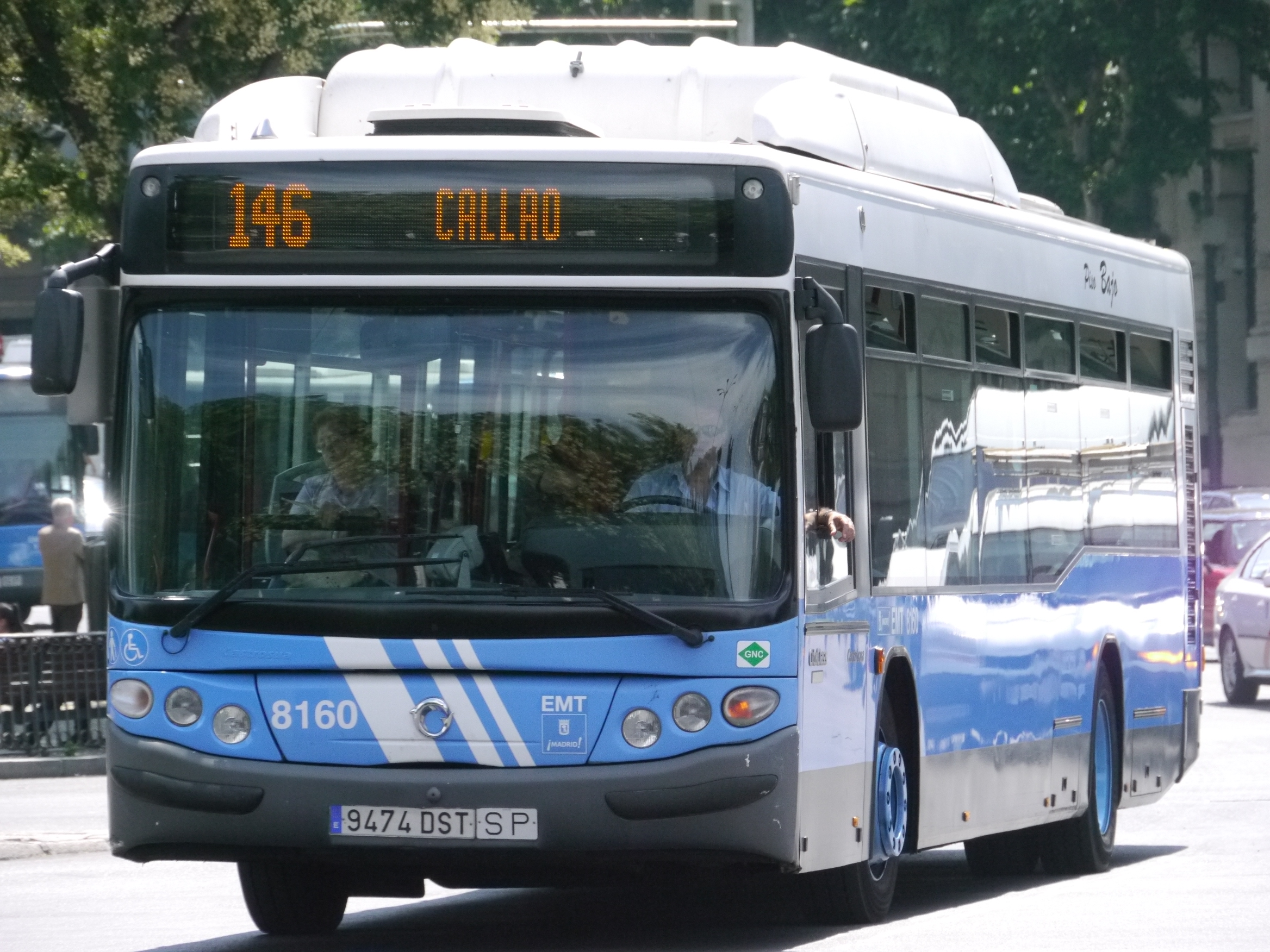
EMT Castrasua Iveco Irsibus operating on line 146.

This railway network is supported by an ever-expanding network of city buses. The overall length of the bus network of Madrid's Municipal Transport Corporation (Empresa Municipal de Transportes de Madrid, or EMT Madrid) at the end of 2013 stood at 3,690 km (2,293 mi), marking a 31% increase over the last eight years. These routes are serviced by a growing fleet of over 3,000 vehicles. The EMT network is very dense, with 217 routes and over 10,000 stops, and almost all the population of the municipality lives within 300m of a bus stop. The buses in Madrid are the only public transport system available around the clock as the metro network closes down between 2.00 and 6.00 am. The night buses, also known as "Buhos" (Owls), operate from 11.45pm to 6.00am. The heavy traffic in Madrid can in some cases make the city buses a fairly slow form of transportation but the city of Madrid has more than 90 km of special bus and taxi lines to help solve this issue. Buses serving the outer areas are run by 33 private companies, coordinated by the Consorcio Regional de Transportes de Madrid. This network is fundamentally radial.

==== Metro ====
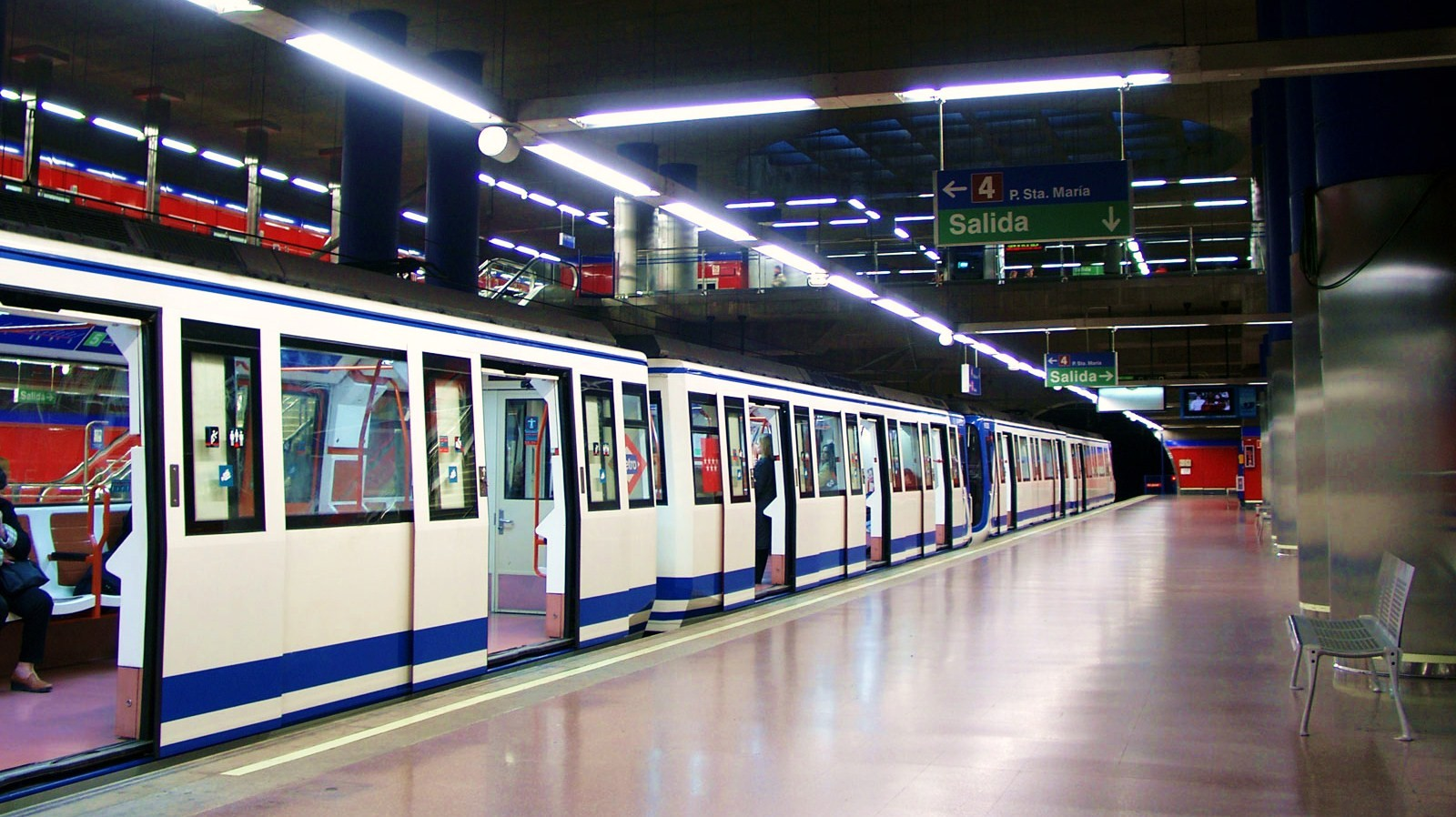
The Madrid Metro is one of the largest and fastest growing systems in the world.

Madrid Metro Map

Serving a population of some five million, the Madrid Metro (Metro de Madrid) is one of the most extensive and fastest-growing metro networks in the world. With the addition of a loop serving suburbs to Madrid's south-west called Metrosur or Line 12, it is now the second longest metro system in Western Europe after London's Underground. After numerous extension projects in the early 2000s, it currently consists of 293 kilometres (182 mi) of mostly underground railway tracks and a total of 302 stations.

The system is the twelfth longest metro in the world, though Madrid is approximately only the fiftieth most populous metropolitan area in the world. Its fast growth in the last 20 years has put it among the fastest growing networks in the world, on par with the Shanghai Metro and the Beijing Subway. Unlike normal Spanish road and rail traffic, Madrid Metro trains use left-hand running on almost all lines due to left-hand traffic being the norm in Madrid until 1924.

The metro network consists of 302 stations. It has 12 lines, one branch line and three Metro Ligero (light metro) tram lines. The network consists of diametrical lines, interconnected by one circular line (Line 6). It gives good coverage to much of the municipality – about 50% of the population live within 600m of a metro station.

==== Local rail ====
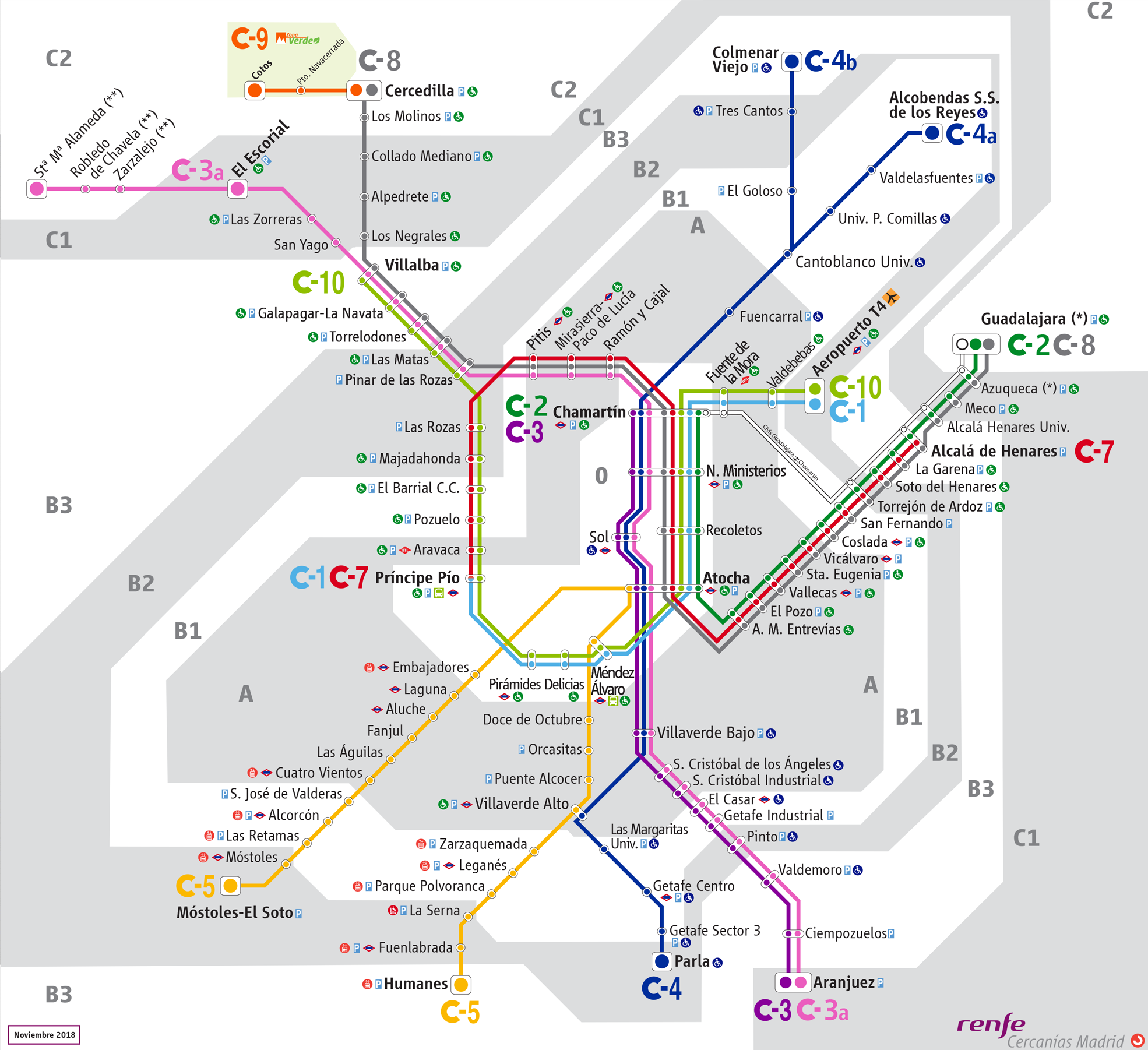
Cercanías Madrid network (as of November 2018)

Spain's railway system, the Red Nacional de Ferrocarriles Españoles (Renfe) operates the vast majority of Spain's railways. Cercanías Madrid is the commuter rail service that serves Madrid and its metropolitan area. It is operated by Cercanías, the commuter rail division of Renfe. The total length spans 382 kilometres (237.4 miles). Main rail terminals are Atocha in the south and Chamartín in the north. The Cercanías network consists of 9 lines and 98 stations.

==== Other modes ====
Madrid has a single cable car, the Teleférico de Madrid, which links the Parque del Oeste with the Casa de Campo.

The BiciMAD bike-sharing scheme was introduced in 2014.

==== Madrid Public Transportation Statistics ====
The average amount of time people spend commuting with public transit in Madrid, for example to and from work, on a weekday is 62 min. 13% of public transit riders, ride for more than 2 hours every day. The average amount of time people wait at a stop or station for public transit is 11 min, while 13% of riders wait for over 20 minutes on average every day. The average distance people usually ride in a single trip with public transit is 9.5 km, while 25% travel for over 12 km in a single direction.

== Long-distance transport ==
Although distant from other great centres of the EU, modern transport links are lessening this disadvantage. There has been large investment in transport infrastructure focussing on Madrid, including radial autovías, high-speed rail, and Madrid-Barajas airport.

=== Road ===
As noted above, Madrid is the focal point of the high-capacity autovía network, linking it with most parts of the country as well as France and Portugal. The road network is now regarded as largely complete, with attention turning to maintenance and road safety.

=== High-speed rail ===
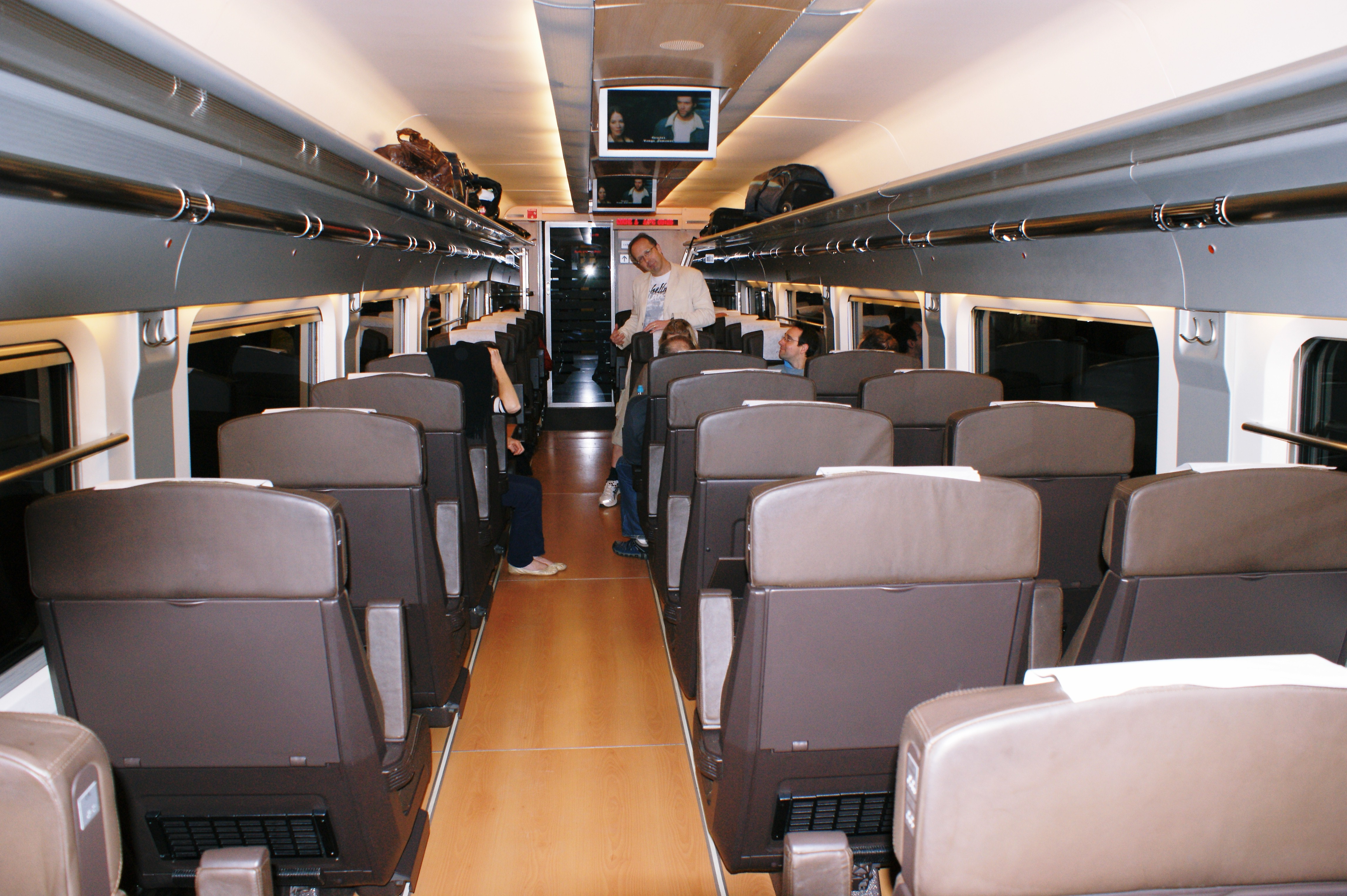
Interior of 1st Class coach of Alsthom AVE on the Cordoba - Madrid Atocha High Speed Line

Madrid ranks alongside Tokyo and Paris as one of the world's three largest high-speed railway hubs, acting as the focal point of the Spanish high-speed rail network, Alta Velocidad Española (AVE), inaugurated in 1992 with the opening of the Madrid-Seville line. There are now 2,900 km of AVE track, connecting Madrid with Barcelona, Málaga, Seville, Valencia, Valladolid, Zaragoza and 11 other provincial capitals. A tunnel has been constructed between the two terminal stations of Atocha and Chamartín, and Atocha has been expanded. The radial character and great extension of the AVE network confer on Madrid exceptional accessibility by rail: the journey time is only 2 hours 30 minutes to Barcelona and Seville. Connection from Madrid by AVE will further increase due to lines under construction to Galicia, Asturias, País Vasco, Alicante, Murcia and Extremadura. About 23M passengers used the AVE in 2011. AVE has taken a large share of travel on the routes served: since the opening of the line to Seville, journeys by train between the two places increased from 14% to 50%, while air fell from 11% to 4% and road from 75% to 46%.

=== Rail freight ===
The Yiwu - Madrid Railway line is the longest cargo goods railway line in the world, at 8,111 miles. It connects the Spanish capital to France, Germany, Poland, Belarus, Russia, Kazakhstan and China.

=== Air ===
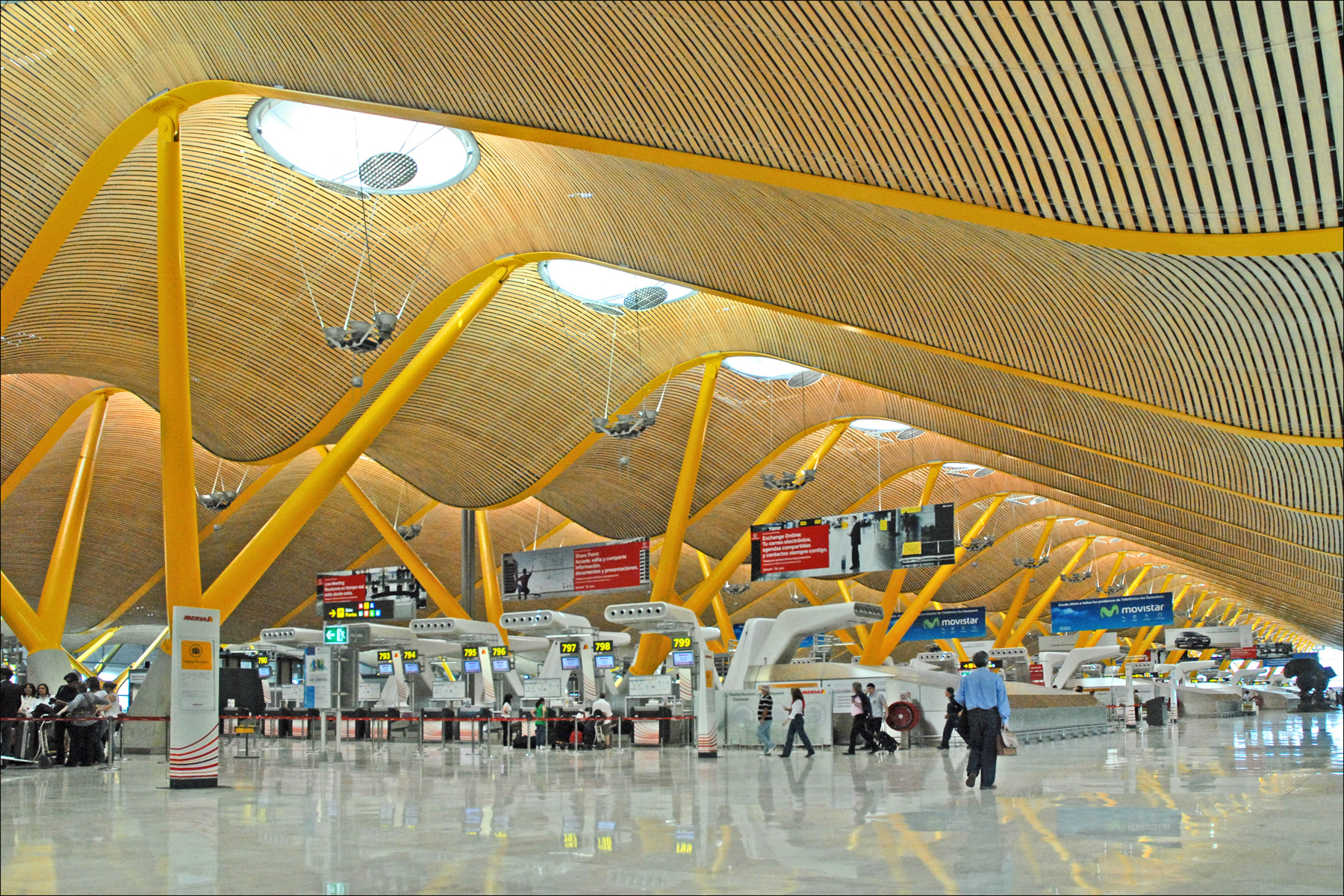
Adolfo Suárez Madrid–Barajas Airport (T4 Station)

Madrid–Barajas Airport (Aeropuerto de Madrid-Barajas) is Spain's busiest airport, and is the main hub of Iberia Airlines. Important to the city's economy as the largest business in Madrid, estimated to generate 44,000 jobs directly and 210,000 indirectly, it serves as the main gateway to the Iberian peninsula from Europe, America and the rest of the world. In 2013 Barajas handled 39.74M passengers (down 20% from a peak of 49.87M in 2011), of whom 70% were international travellers, in addition to 343.62M tonnes of freight. The passenger volumes make it Spain's largest and busiest airport, and in the same year it was the world's 29th busiest airport and Europe's sixth busiest airport. Airfreight movements through Barajas are 52% those of all Spain, and 83.4% of international air freight. A new fourth terminal has been constructed, which has significantly reduced delays and doubled the capacity of the airport to more than 70 million passengers per year. Two additional runways have also been constructed, making Barajas a fully operational four-runway airport that can handle 120 flights per hour.

The airport is located within the city limits of Madrid, at 9 km (5.6 mi) from the city's financial district and 13 km (8.1 mi) northeast of the Puerta del Sol, Madrid's historic centre. It has good connections with the city centre by autovía, Cercanías and Metro. The airport name derives from the adjacent district of Barajas, which has its own metro station on the same rail line serving the airport.

The closed Ciudad Real Central Airport was intended to be the second airport for the city, linked to it by high-speed rail.

=== Bus ===
Aside from the local and regional bus commuting services, Madrid is also a node for long-distance bus connections to plenty of national destinations. The Estación Sur de Autobuses in Méndez Álvaro, the busiest bus station in the country, also features international bus connections to cities in Morocco as well as to diverse European destinations.

== Logistical platform ==
The region concentrates 54% by value of the national transport of goods & logistical operations, employing 122,000. Favoured by central position, radiality of road & rail routes, importance of the airport, As well as being a large centre of production and consumption, it is a great distribution centre. The municipality concentrates two-thirds of the region's employment in the sector, but this is becoming more decentralised. A regional plan seeks to create nine new logistical centres outside the city, in order to decongest the central areas and rationalise distribution chains.
