= M-45 (Spain) =

Highway in Madrid, Spain

Autopista M-45
- Autopista de Circunvalación

Route information
- Maintained by Commonwealth of Madrid
- Length: 37 km (23 mi)

Major junctions
- West end: M-40 near Carabanchel - Leganés

- East end: A-2 / M-50 near San Fernando de Henares

Location
- Country: Spain
- Autonomous community: Madrid

Highway system
- Highways in Spain; Autopistas and autovías; National Roads

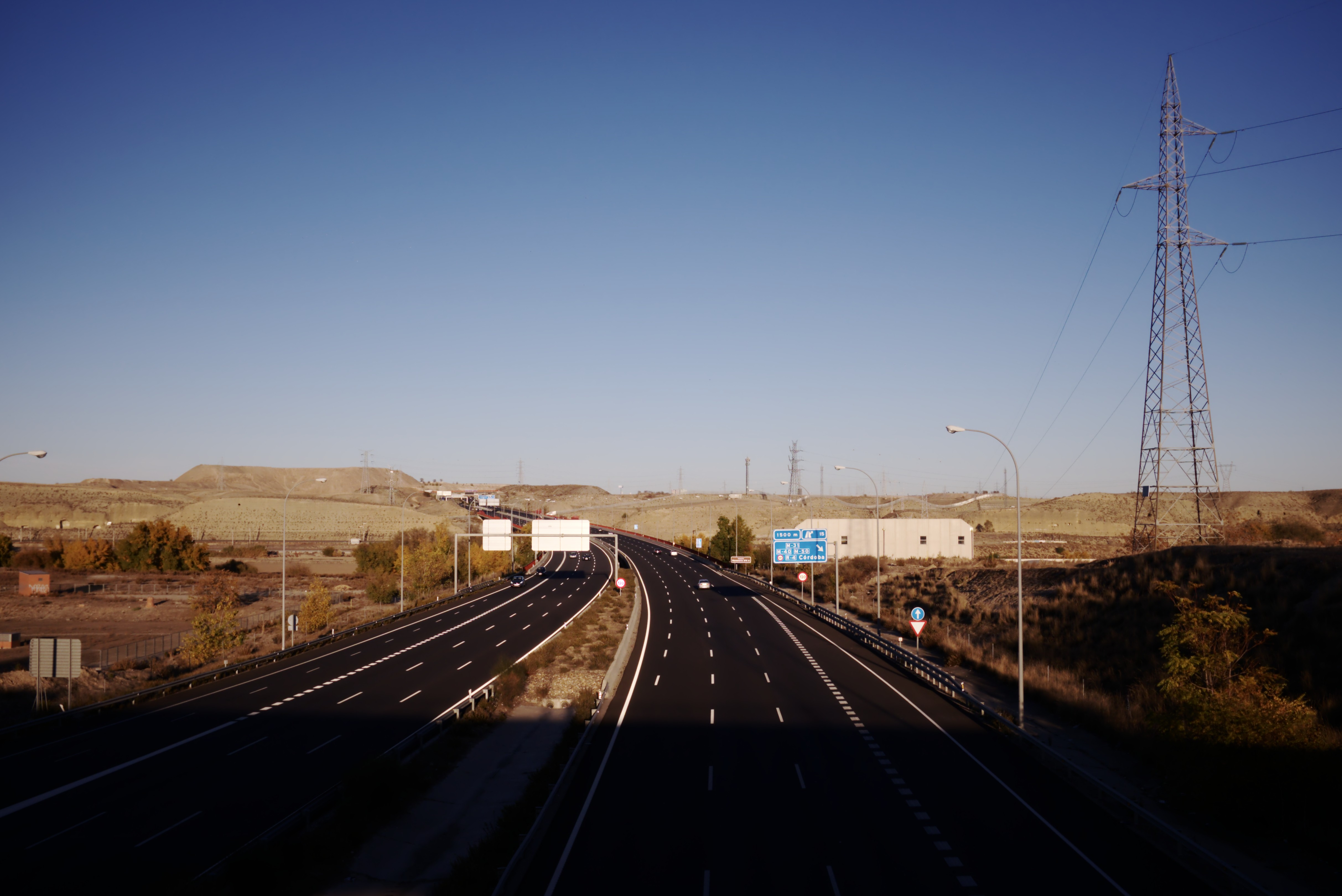
M-45 seen from the bridge of M-301

The M-45 is a highway bypass built in the Community of Madrid of regional importance. It begins at Exit 28-B of the M-40 highway, in Carabanchel, and ends at Coslada, where it joins with the M-50. The highway connects two national highways, the A-2 and A-5. It is the third ring road around Madrid.

The M-45 was considered the best highway in Madrid in terms of safety and fluidity from a survey conducted in 2003 by the Ministry of Public Works, Town Planning and Transport of the Community of Madrid. It was also the first road to use the financing system known as shadow toll, giving rise to legal studies on this financing method. The cost that the Madrid government paid was 8 cents per kilometer per car, and 2.64 euros for each vehicle passing through all the way. On the 7th of June, 2012, the Regional President Esperanza Aguirre announced that before the end of 2012, the M-45 would toll drivers directly due to high maintenance costs as well as economic problems of the regional government.

== Planning and construction ==
For the purpose of construction, the highway was divided into three sections totaling 37 kilometers. The award was given to Globalvia and the construction was funded by the so-called shadow toll procedure.

It opened on March 14 of 2002, soon circulated around half of 72,000 vehicles, easing the Autopista de Circunvalación M-40 and M-50 at 40,000 cars. In 2011, an average daily traffic of 96,913 vehicles a day was recorded in its busiest section between Leganés and Getafe.

The use of shadow toll as a means of funding has been controversial. The group of United Left in the Assembly of Madrid argues that it significantly increases public spending. According to a report, the cost of operating the highway for 25 years with shadow tolls would amount to 1.838 billion euros, while direct execution would have cost less than 600 million euros. The Ministry of Public Works, ruled by the Popular Party, defended the system and said that the own Ministry planned to use it.

== Average Daily Traffic (ADT) ==
The detail of the average daily traffic in 2011, according to "Traffic Management Study on the roads of the Community of Madrid" published by the Community of Madrid, is as follows:

| Km | Mi | Average Daily Traffic | % Heavy vehicles | Location of Measurement |
|---|---|---|---|---|
| 3.500 | 2.175 | 62,751 | 9.62 | Between M-40 and the link & Leganés |
| 6.520 | 4.051 | 96,913 | 10.84 | Between Leganés & Getafe/Villaverde |
| 8.450 | 5.251 | 89,916 | 11.40 | Between Getafe/Villaverde & A-4 |
| 10.230 | 6.357 | 63,270 | 11.11 | Between A-4 & M-301 |
| 12.980 | 8.065 | 59,124 | 13.39 | Between M-301 & PAU Vallecas |
| 17.830 | 11.079 | 59,197 | 14.36 | Between PAU Vallecas & A-3 |
| 19.770 | 12.285 | 55,748 | 14.18 | Between A-3 & M-203 |
| 25.750 | 16.000 | 54,418 | 10.21 | Between M-203 & M-206 |
| 29.150 | 18.113 | 87,260 | 19.49 | Between M-206 & San Fernando-Torrejón |
| 32.250 | 20.039 | 90,081 | 19.98 | Between San Fernando-Torrejón & A-2 |

== Concessions ==
The award is divided into three sections. The remuneration to the concession is made by the shadow toll method.

| Stretch | End of Grant | Concessions | Shareholders | Percentage |
|---|---|---|---|---|
| Section I | 2012 | Concesiones de Madrid, S.A. | Globalvia | 100% |
| Section II | 2019 | Autopista Trados-45, S.A. | Iberpistas | 50% |
| Section II | 2019 | Autopista Trados-45, S.A. | Finavías | 50% |
| Section III | 2019 | Euroglosa 45 Concesionaria de la Comunidad de Madrid, S.A. | OHL | 100% |

== Exits ==
| Element | Output designation (clockwise) / View from top to bottom | Exit number | Output designation (counter-clockwise) / Viewed from bottom to top | Connecting Road | Notes |
|---|---|---|---|---|---|
| | Autopista de Circunvalación M-40 | | Madrid Continue along the Autopista de Circunvalación M-40 in the direction of Badajoz | Autopista de Circunvalación M-40 | Carabanchel |
| | Leganés Vía Lusitana avenida de Carabanchel Alto Toledo - Badajoz | 2 | Toledo - Badajoz - Leganés | R-5 M-425 | Carabanchel |
| | Vía Lusitana | 2A | Mostoles - Toledo - Badajoz | M-425 R-5 | Continuous exit following the end of the deceleration lane. Carabanchel |
| | Leganés | 2B | Leganés | M-425 | Continuous exit following the end of the deceleration lane. Carabanchel |
| | avenida de Carabanchel Alto | 2C | | M-421 | Continuous exit following the end of the deceleration lane. Carabanchel |
| | Toledo - Leganés Centro Comercial | 6 | Centro Comercial Toledo - Getafe - Villaverde | A-42 motorway (Spain) M-402 | Split of exits in a counterclockwise direction, very close together |
| | | 7 | Centro Comercial - Getafe - Villaverde - Madrid | A-42 motorway (Spain) | |
| | | 9 A-B | Centro Comercial - Córdoba - Madrid - San Martín de la Vega - Parque Warner | E-5 (Spain) A-4 M-301 | |
| | Córdoba - Madrid - San Martín de la Vega - Parque Warner | 11 | | E-5 (Spain) A-4 M-301 | |
| | | 15 | Autopista de Circunvalación M-40 M-50 (Spain) R4 (Spain) Córdoba | M-31 (Spain) | |
| | | 17 | Madrid - Valencia - Ensanche de Vallecas | E-901 A-3 | |
| | Autopista de Circunvalación M-40 M-50 (Spain) R4 (Spain) Córdoba | 15 | | M-31 (Spain) | |
| | | 20 | Vallecas - Mejorada del Campo - Vicálvaro | M-203 | |
| | Madrid - Valencia - Ensanche de Vallecas | 17 | | E-901 A-3 | |
| | Vallecas - Mejorada del Campo - Vicálvaro | 20 | | M-203 | |
| | Madrid Valencia | 22 | Madrid - Valencia | R-3 motorway (Spain) | |
| | Coslada | 25 | Coslada | | |
| | Mejorada del Campo - San Fernando de Henares | 25 | Mejorada del Campo - San Fernando de Henares | M-203 M-206 | Dangerous exit from the central lanes to the side lane, due to the absence of a continuous lane. |
| | R-3 motorway (Spain) Valencia A-3 E-901 Valencia A-4 A-42 motorway (Spain) | | | M-50 (Spain) | |
| | | 33 | Madrid - Zaragoza Aeropuerto Feria de Madrid | E-90 A-2 | |
| | | 32 | Autopista de Circunvalación M-40 Feria de Madrid Aeropuerto - Zaragoza - San Fernando de Henares - Torrejón de Ardoz | M21 (Spain) E-90 A-2 M-206 | Exit via the central roadways |
| | Continúa por M-50 (Spain) | | M-50 (Spain) | M-50 (Spain) | |

== See also ==
- M-30
- M-40
- M-50
- Área metropolitana de Madrid
- Anexo:Carreteras de la Comunidad de Madrid
- Anexo:Autopistas y autovías de España
