= M-50 (Spain) =

Orbital motorway in Madrid

Autopista M-50
- Autopista de Circunvalación M-50

Route information
- Length: 85 km (53 mi)

Major junctions
- From: Autovía A-1 (San Sebastián de los Reyes)
- To: Autovía A-6 (Pinar de las Rozas)

Location
- Country: Spain
- Provinces: Comunidad de Madrid

Highway system
- Highways in Spain; Autopistas and autovías; National Roads

The M-50 orbital motorway is the outermost ring road of Madrid and its metropolitan area. It has a length of 85 km (53 mi) and, unlike the other ring roads, doesn't form a closed ring, lacking a connection in the northwest between A-6 and A-1. It runs at an average distance of 13.5 km (8.4 mi) from the Puerta del Sol. It is the longest beltway in the Madrid region, and may be compared with London's M25 motorway and Berlin's A10 beltway.

It is managed by the central government. Its construction was financed using a shadow toll system, paid with the tolls collected from the motorways R-2, R-3, R-4 and R-5.

== Nomenclature ==
The M-50 name was chosen as the highway is theoretically the fifth ring road in Madrid.

The first ring is formed by the streets that follow the route of Felipe IV's wall of Madrid along the streets known as the Rondas (Ronda de Segovia, Ronda de Toledo, Ronda de Valencia, Ronda de Atocha) and the Bulevares (Génova, Sagasta, Carranza, Alberto Aguilera, Marqués de Urquijo) and the roads linking both.

The second ring is formed by the boundaries of Madrid's 19th Century Ensanche, following the proposed Paseo de Ronda.

Finally, the third and fourth rings are, respectively, M-30 and M-40.

== History ==
The highway was begun in 1990, one from the A-4 up to Getafe to M-409 at Fuenlabrada, this section was known with "Way of Culebro" for a nearby stream. This is the southern section of road. Another section was also built from Majadahonda to the A-6 at Las Rozas, as part of the highway M-503, to be subsequently incorporated into the M-50. Later, it was when it was extended from the A-4 to A-3 and then to the A-1 at San Sebastián de los Reyes and completing the section A-4-Majadahonda in 2002 .

Since the discovery in 2003 of a field of flint mines in Vicálvaro, work was stopped between the M-45 and A-3. After finally modifying the path slightly, on 26 June 2007 the section was completed between the A-3 and M-45 .

Regional politicians of the Autonomous Government of Madrid have considered ending the ring between the A-6 and A-1, passing under El Pardo by building a tunnel and toll highway, independent of M-50; but for now, the drafting and subsequent implementation of a project in this regard, remains the responsibility of the General Directorate of Roads of the Ministry of Development, being the road is in the State Highway Network.

== Route ==
Localities and main route of M-50:

- San Sebastián de los Reyes A-1
- Aeropuerto de Madrid-Barajas R-2
- Paracuellos de Jarama M-111
- Ajalvir M-113
- R-2
- INTA M-115
- Torrejón de Ardoz A-2
- Coslada Autopista M-21
- San Fernando de Henares M-206
- Autopista M-45
- R-3
- Rivas-Vaciamadrid A-3
- M-31
- Perales del Río M-301
- Pinto A-4
- R-4
- Getafe Autovía A-42
- Leganés. Fuenlabrada M-409
- Parque de Polvoranca M-407
- Autopista de peaje R-5
- Móstoles M-506
- Alcorcón
- A-5
- M-506
- Villaviciosa de Odón
- Boadilla del Monte M-501
- Majadahonda M-503
- Las Rozas de Madrid M-505
- A-6

== Exits ==
Elemento	Nombre de salida (sentido horario)/Ver de arriba-abajo	Número de salida	Nombre de salida (sentido antihorario)/Ver de abajo-arriba	Carretera que enlaza	Notas
	A-1		Madrid – Burgos Continúa por A-1	E-5 (spain) A-1	
	Madrid - Aeropuerto Autopista de Circunvalación M-40 Sentido A-6	4	Madrid - Aeropuerto Autopista de Circunvalación M-40 Sentido A-6	R-2	
	Paracuellos – Fuente el Saz de Jarama	5	Paracuellos – Fuente el Saz de Jarama	M-111	
	Guadalajara – Zaragoza	8		R-2	
	Ajalvir – Daganzo de Arriba – Paracuellos	10	Ajalvir – Daganzo de Arriba – Paracuellos	M-113	
		8	Guadalajara – Zaragoza	R-2	
	I.N.T.A – Torrejón de Ardoz	13	Ajalvir – Daganzo de Arriba – Paracuellos	M-113	
	Madrid – Zaragoza Aeropuerto Feria de Madrid - Coslada – San Fernando de Henares – Torrejón de Ardoz	17		E-90 A-2 M-21 M-206	
		33	Madrid – Zaragoza Aeropuerto Feria de Madrid	E-90 A-2	
	Coslada - Autopista de Circunvalación M-40	19 A-B	Torrejon de Ardoz – Parque Empresarial – Zona Industrial – Coslada Autopista de Circunvalación M-40	M-21	Salida por las calzadas laterales
	Torrejon de Ardoz – San Fernando de Henares	17	Torrejon de Ardoz – San Fernando de Henares	M-206	Salida por las calzadas laterales
		32	Autopista de Circunvalación M-40 Feria de Madrid Aeropuerto - Zaragoza – San Fernando de Henares – Torrejón de Ardoz	M-21 E-90 A-2 M-206	Salida por las calzadas centrales
	R-3 - Valencia - A-3 E-901 Valencia A-4 A-42			Autopista M-45	Incorporación de dicha autovía
	Madrid – Valencia	26	Madrid – Valencia	R-3	
	Madrid – Valencia	31	Madrid – Valencia	A-3 E-901	
	Área de Servicio Valdemingómez	-	Área de Servicio Valdemingómez		
	Madrid Autopista de Circunvalación M-40 Autopista M-45	37	Todas las direcciones Autopista de Circunvalación M-40 Autopista M-45	M-31	
	Túnel de Perales del Río 665 m		Túnel de Perales del Río 665 m		
	Perales del Río – San Martín de la Vega	41	Perales del Río – San Martín de la Vega	M-301	
	Madrid – Córdoba Área empresarial Andalucía C.L.A – Centro Comercial	46	Madrid – Córdoba	A-4 E-5 (Spain)	
	Aranjuez – Ocaña – Córdoba	48	Aranjuez – Ocaña – Córdoba – Área empresarial Andalucía C.L.A.- Centro Comercial	R-4	
	Getafe – Madrid – Toledo	51	Getafe – Madrid – Toledo	A-42 M-506	
	Vía de Servicio – Fuenlabrada – Getafe	53	Vía de Servicio – Fuenlabrada – Getafe		
	Leganés	A		M-409	
		55	Leganés	M-409	
	Fuenlabrada – Leganés	B		M-407	
	Fuenlabrada	C		M-409	
	Madrid Autopista de Circunvalación M-40	56		R-5	
	Móstoles – Toledo – Badajoz	58		R-5	
	Móstoles	59	Leganés – Fuenlabrada	M-409 M-407	
		60	Madrid – Toledo – Badajoz	R-5	
		62		E-90 A-5	
		63	Móstoles		
	Villaviciosa – Centro Comercial – Brunete	64			
		65	Villaviciosa – Mostoles – Centro Comercial – Badajoz – Alcorcón – Madrid	M-506 E-90 A-5	
	Área de Servicio La Atalaya	-	Área de Servicio La Atalaya		
	Boadilla del Monte – Brunete – Villaviciosa	69		M-513 M-501 Autopista de Circunvalación M-40	
		72	Boadilla del Monte – Brunete – Villaviciosa	M-513 M-501 Autopista de Circunvalación M-40	
	Túnel de Valdepastores 800 m		Túnel de Valdepastores 800 m		
	Túnel de Boadilla 500 m		Túnel de Boadilla 500 m		
	Majadahonda – Villanueva de la Cañada – Pozuelo – Madrid	76	Majadahonda – Boadilla del Monte – Villanueva de la Cañada – Pozuelo – Madrid	M-503 M-516	
	Majadahonda – Villanueva del Pardillo – Centro Comercial Gran Plaza 2	79		M-509	
	Las Rozas – El Escorial	80		M-505	
	Madrid – Parque empresarial Las Rozas – Centro de Ocio – Zona Comercial	82		A-6	
		83	Villanueva del Pardillo – Las Rozas – El Escorial	M-505	
	La Coruña Continúa por A-6		A-6	A-6	
