= Luca Rovinalti =

Italian journalist and media executive

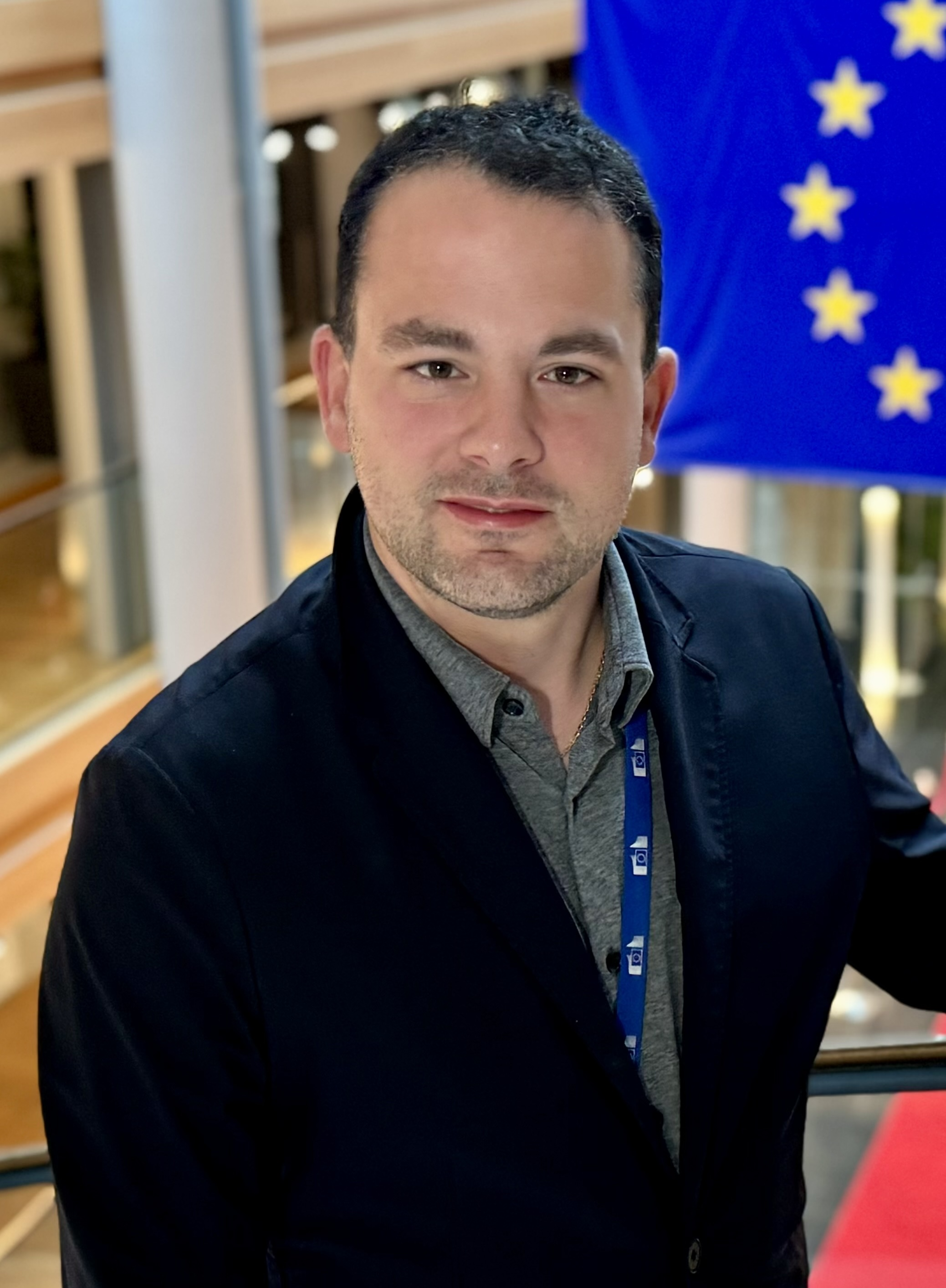
- Rovinalti in 2025
- Born: 4 January 1987 (age 39); Italy
- Education: Real Madrid Graduate School – Universidad Europea (MBA)
- Occupations: Journalist, media executive
- Years active: 2006–present
- Known for: Founder of Svet Solutions Media

Luca Rovinalti (born 4 January 1987) is an Italian journalist and media executive. He is the founder and chief executive of Svet Solutions Media, an audiovisual production and news-gathering company established in Prague in 2015, and was the Czech Republic correspondent of Euronews from 2018 to 2020. He is a member of the International Academy of Television Arts and Sciences.

== Early life and education ==
Rovinalti was born in Italy. He studied diplomacy at the Diplomatická akademie in Prague and at the European Academy of Diplomacy in Warsaw, and in 2014 completed the programme of the Visegrád School of Political Studies, part of the Council of Europe's network of Schools of Political Studies; he is a co-author of the school's publication Visegrád Group – United in Diversity. He later obtained an Executive MBA in sports management from the Real Madrid Graduate School – Universidad Europea.

== Career ==
=== Journalism ===
From 2013 to 2018 he was executive director of the International Press Club of Prague. In 2014 he was one of five young journalists invited by Index on Censorship to contribute to a special report on the future of journalism. Between 2016 and 2017 he worked with the EU–China Economics and Politics Institute.

From 2018 to 2020 Rovinalti was the Czech Republic correspondent of Euronews. His reporting included the April 2019 rally in Prague of European nationalist leaders, among them Marine Le Pen and Geert Wilders, ahead of the 2019 European Parliament election.

=== Svet Solutions Media ===
In 2015 Rovinalti founded Svet Solutions Media in the Czech Republic. The company produces documentaries and television reportage and provides camera crews and live-transmission services to international broadcasters. It later expanded into a group with companies in the Czech Republic, Italy and the United States. As a member of the Forbes Business Council he has written commentary on the television industry for Forbes, and he has been cited by Newsweek on the media industry.

== Memberships and recognition ==
Rovinalti was elected a member of the International Academy of Television Arts and Sciences in March 2023 and served on the juries of the International Emmy Awards in 2024 and 2025. He is a member of the Forbes Business Council. In 2023 Fortune Italia included him in its "40 Under 40" list of managers.
