= M50 road =

M50 road may refer to:

- M50 motorway (Ireland), a major road in Dublin
- M50 motorway (England), a road in the United Kingdom
- M-50 (Spain), Madrid third outer ring road
- M-50 (Michigan highway), a road in the United States of America
