= University of Madrid =

University of Madrid may refer to:

- Complutense University of Madrid, a public research university founded in 1293, historically referred to as the Universidad de Madrid
- Autonomous University of Madrid, a public university established in 1968 also known as UAM
- Technical University of Madrid, founded in 1971 from the merger of several schools of engineering and architecture, originated mainly in the 18th century
- Carlos III University of Madrid, a public university founded in 1989
- European University of Madrid, a private university founded in 1995 and owned by Laureate Education, Inc.
