= M50 motorway =

M50 motorway may refer to:

- M50 motorway (Ireland), a major road in Dublin
- M50 motorway (England), a road in the United Kingdom

== See also ==
- M-50 (Spain), Madrid third outer ring road
- M-50 (Michigan highway), a road in the United States of America
