= Autopista de Circunvalación M-30 =

Motorway in Madrid, Spain

Autopista M-30

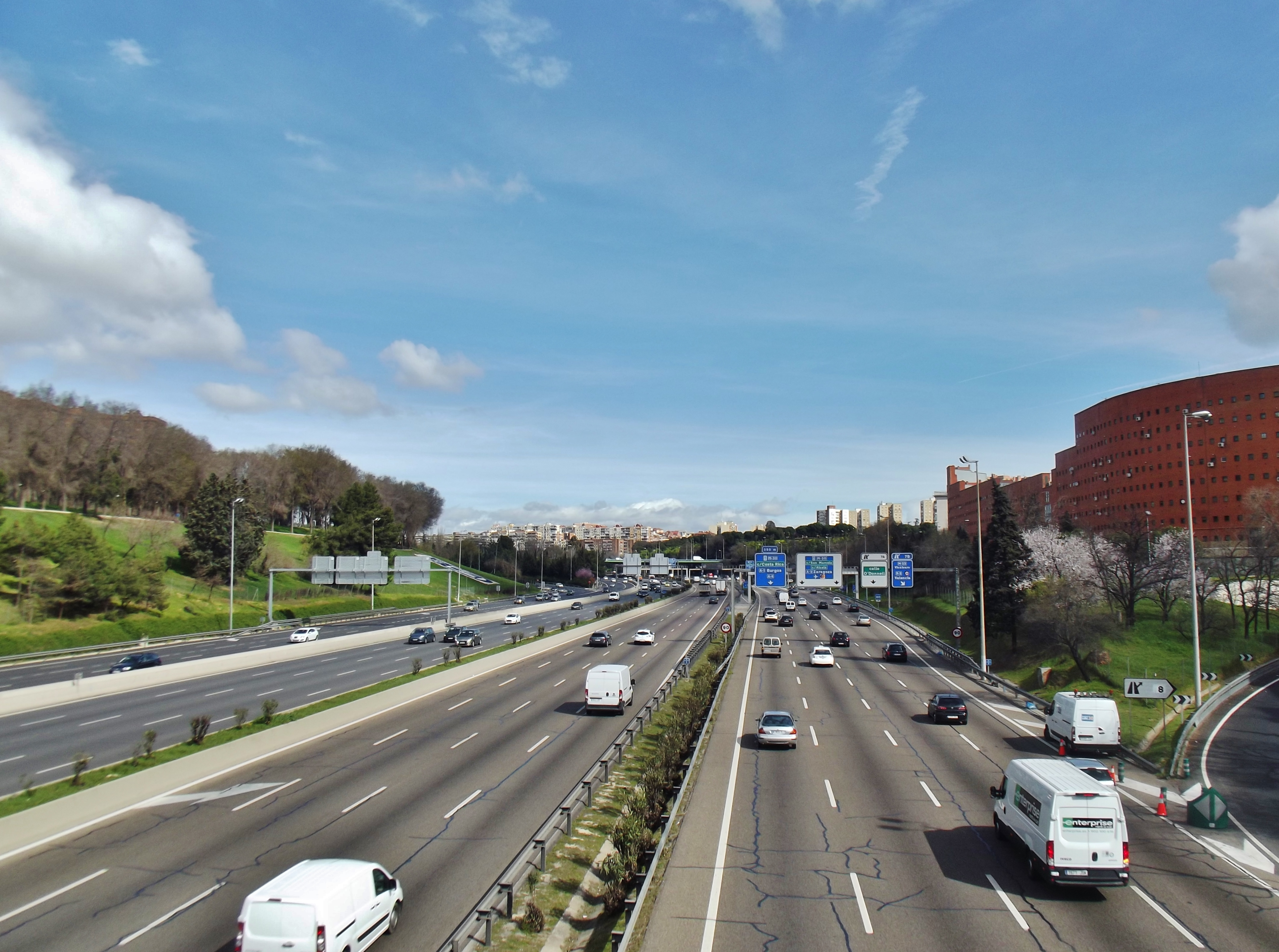

Route information
- Length: 32.5 km (20.2 mi)

Highway system
- Highways in Spain; Autopistas and autovías; National Roads; Transport in the Community of Madrid

The M-30 orbital motorway circles the central districts of Madrid, the capital city of Spain. It is the innermost ring road of the Spanish city, with a length of 32.5 km. Outer rings are named M-40, M-45 and M-50. Its length and the surface surrounded by the M-30 is comparable to the Boulevard Périphérique of Paris, the Grande Raccordo Anulare of Rome or the London Inner Ring Road.

The Madrid M-30 is a major orbital motorway around Madrid that varies in structure along its length: some stretches have up to three lanes in each direction, while others narrow, widen, or run in large underground sections rather than standard surface roadway. It links with Spain’s main radial highways (A-1 to A-6) that connect Madrid to other part of the country.

The M30 is widely considered the busiest road in Spain and is well known for chronic congestion. It runs near several prominent landmarks, including Torrespaña (one of the city’s most recognisable broadcast towers. Along the Manzaanares river, sections of the motorway were rebuilt underground during major redevelopment works, including the area beneath the former site of the Vicente Calderón Stadium, which has since been demolished.

== History ==
Its construction started in the 1960s and required the underground canalisation of the Abroñigal river, required to avoid flooding since the road runs through the lowest part of the city. In the 1970s the eastern section (Avenida de la Paz) was open between the junction of Manoteras (cross with the A-1, M-11 and accesses to Sanchinarro) and the Nudo Sur (South Junction), that connects to the Avenida de Andalucía (previously N-IV) and A-4.

The second and western section, the Avenida del Manzanares, follows the course of the Manzanares river from the northwestern Puerta de Hierro junction to the junction with the eastern section.

In the 1990s, the ring road was completed with the construction of the northern section, called Avenida de la Ilustración (the only section of the road with traffic lights) from the junction of Puerta de Hierro (accession to Cardenal Herrera Oria street, M40, and El Pardo road) to the junction of Manoteras with the A-1.

In 2003, the highway was transferred from the Government of Spain to the City Council of Madrid. Mayor Alberto Ruiz Gallardón implemented a plan called "Calle 30" (Street 30), converting sections of the highway in the Manzanares course into tunnels, and building an urban park (Madrid Río) in the surface previously occupied by asphalt. From 2005 to 2008, major upgrading works took place, and now a significant portion of the southern part runs underground. They are the longest urban motorway tunnels in Europe, with sections of more than 6 km in length and 3 to 6 lanes in each direction, between the south entry of the Avenida de Portugal tunnel and the north exit of the M-30 south by-pass there are close to 10 km of continuous tunnels. The M30 tunnels run between a point roughly 700 meters north of the junction with A5 motorway and continue all the way up to the junction between M30 and A3 motorway. The total cost of the works was over 7 billion euro.

== Urban, economic, environmental and cultural significance ==
The M-30 surrounds the inner core (the central districts) of Madrid: Centro, Arganzuela, Retiro, Salamanca, Chamartín, Tetuán, and Chamberí, as well as a small part of Moncloa-Aravaca. This core is home to one quarter of the population of Madrid (about 800,000 people) and is, in average, wealthier than the rest of the city. Also, housing prices are higher inside the M-30. Popularly, the city Madrid is divided in dentro de la M-30 (inside the M-30) and fuera de la M-30 (outside the M-30). The M-30 itself is touted by Madrileños and media as a barrier between the rich and the poor sections of the city.

Pay-per-use parking lots and parking meters in Madrid (usually called ORA in Spain, but SER in Madrid) only exist in the area within the M-30. Access by car to the inner core and the M-30 itself may be restricted in days of high air pollution.

== Multimedia Gallery ==
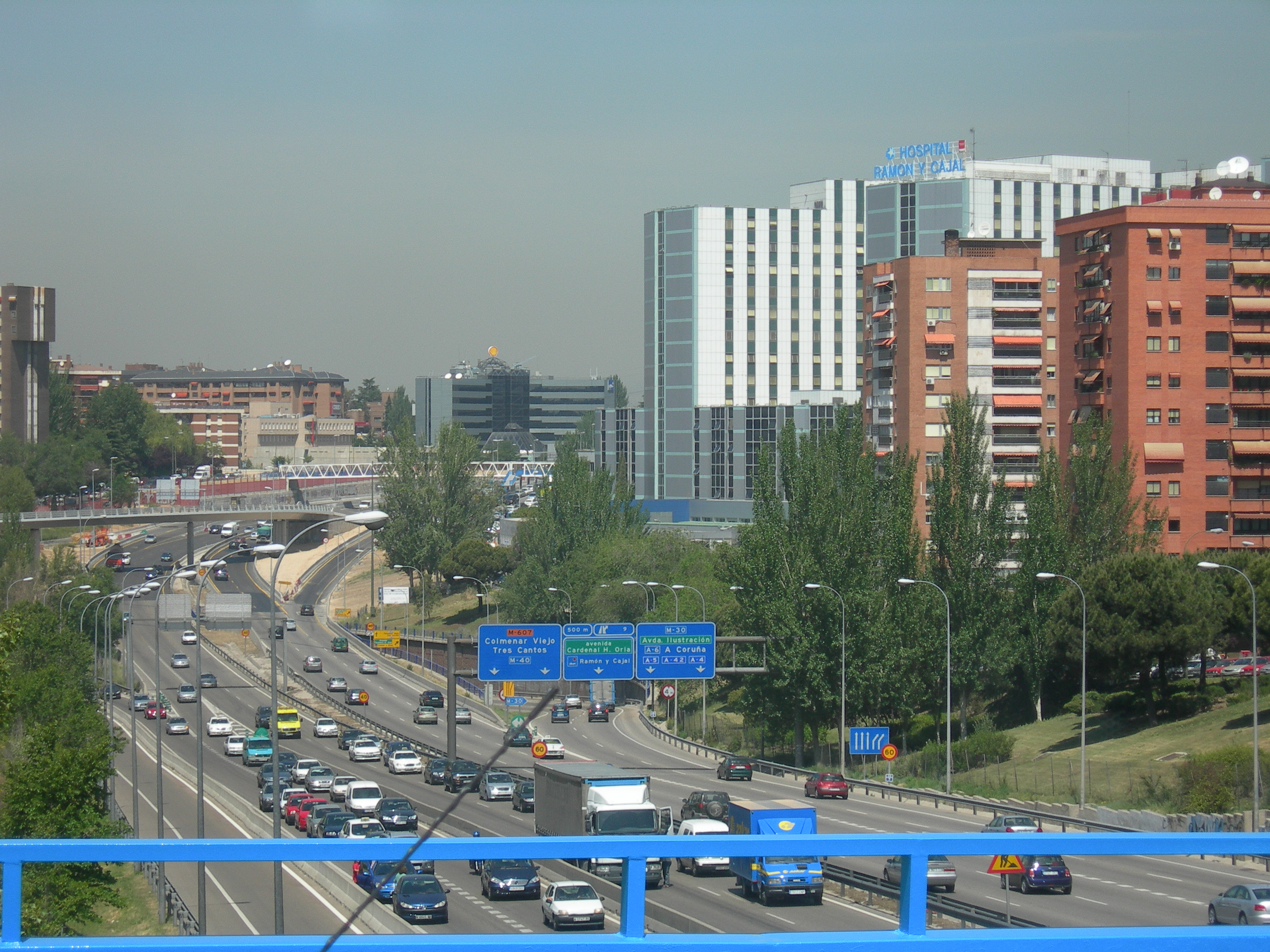
M-30 North

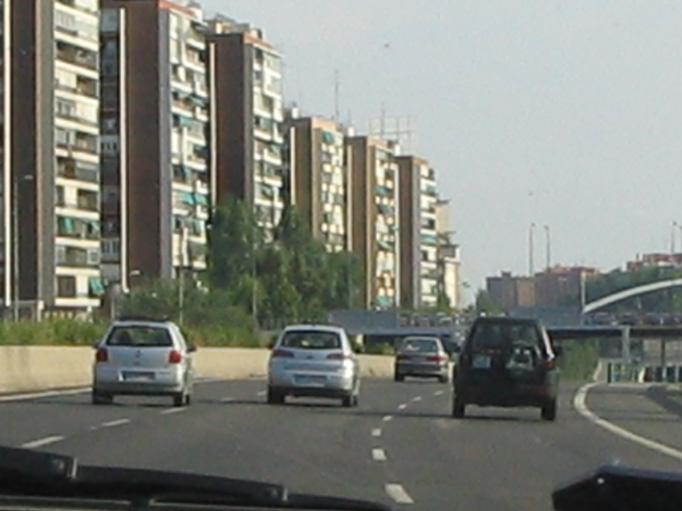
M-30 East

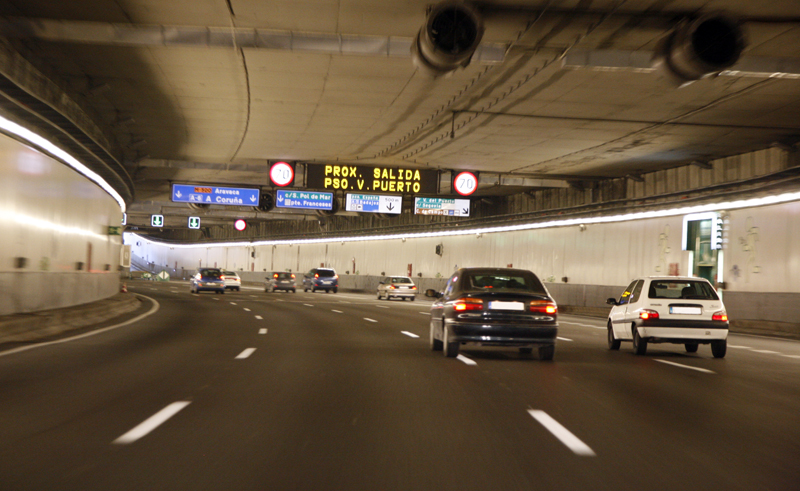
Underground stretch of the M-30

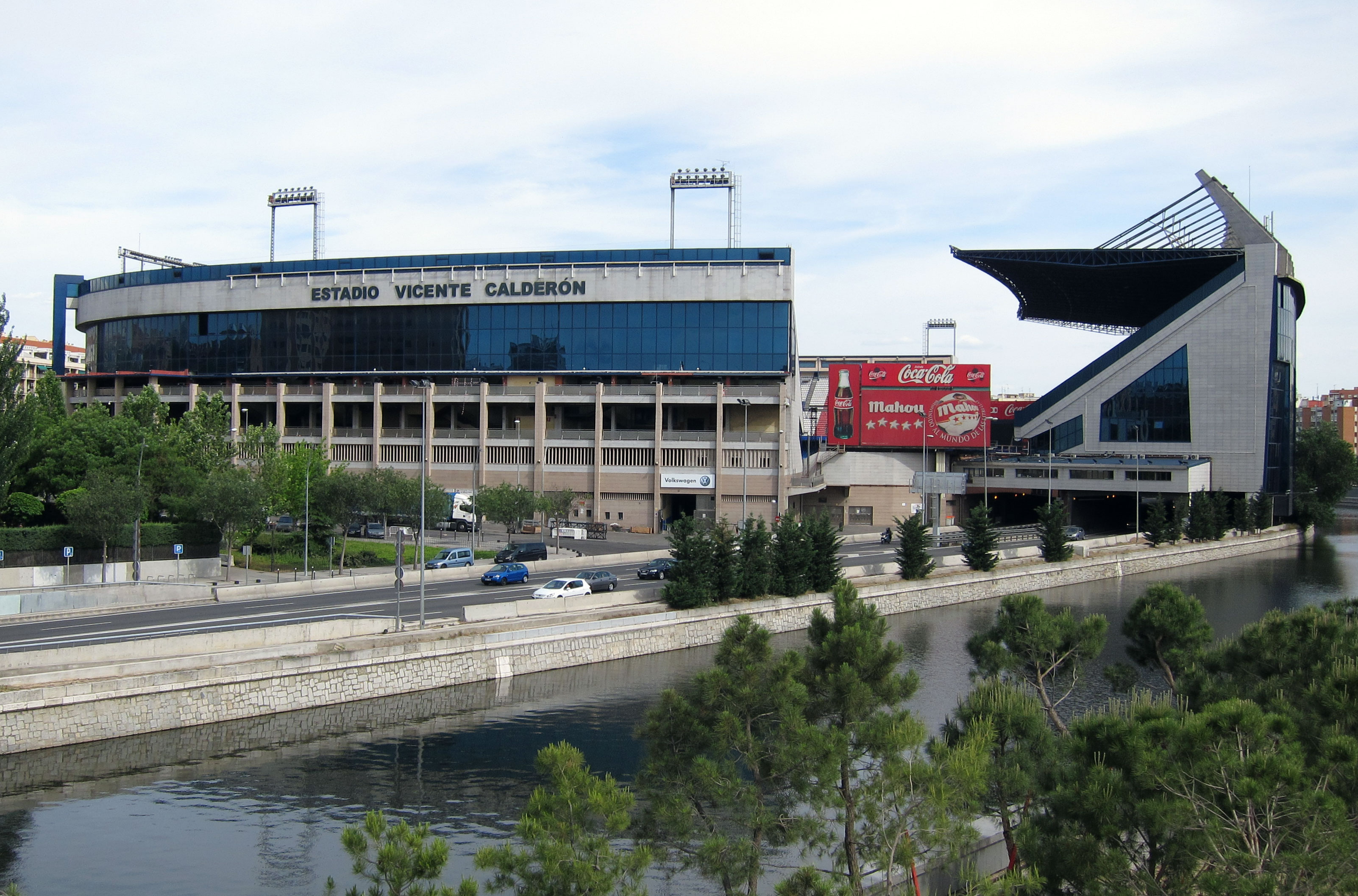
M30 passing under the north side of the Vicente Calderón Stadium (now demolished)

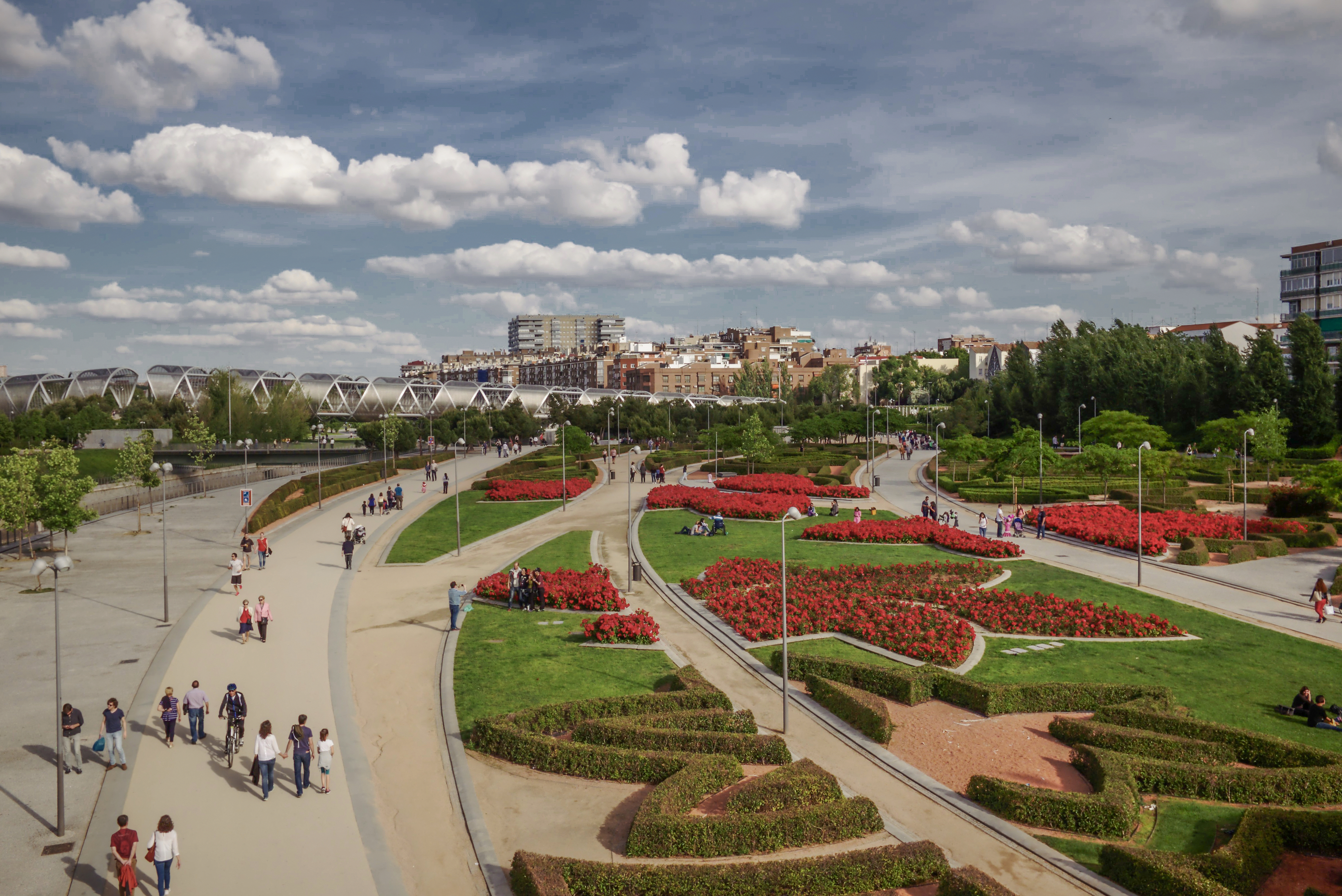
Madrid Río park. Until 2007, this space was occupied by the M-30; now the road traverses a tunnel below the park.

== Exit list ==
The M-30 has the following exits:

#	Destinations	Notes
	Via de Servicio - Centro Comercial, Sanchinarro, Las Tablas	
	A-1 – Alcobendas, Burgos	
2	M-11 to Calle de Arturo Soria (E-90) / A-2 / A-3 / A-4 – Feria de Madrid, Madrid-Barajas Airport, Zaragoza	
1	Avenida Monforte de Lemos, Calle de Sinesio Delgado, Avenida de Burgos, Avenida de Pío XII – Estación de Chamartín	
3	Calle de Serrano Galvache, Avenida de San Luis	Counterclockwise exit and entrance
4B	Plaza Castilla	Counterclockwise exit and clockwise entrance
4A	Calle de Arturo Soria	Counterclockwise exit and entrance
2	Calle de Costa Rica – Plaza de José María Soler	Signed as exit 5 counterclockwise
3	Avenida de Ramón y Cajal – Palacio de Congresos de Madrid	Signed as exit 6 counterclockwise
4A	Avenida de América, Calle de Serrano	Signed as exit 7 counterclockwise
4B	A-2 / Calle de Arturo Soria – Zaragoza	Signed as exit 7 counterclockwise
5	Parque de las Avenidas	Clockwise exit and entrance
8	Calle de la Salvador de Madariaga – Tanatorio	Counterclockwise exit and entrance
6	Calle de Alcalá – Plaza de Cibeles	No counterclockwise exit
7	Avenida Marqués de Corbera, Calle de O'Donnell – Puerta de Alcalá	Clockwise exit and counterclockwise entrance
8	M-23 to R-3 – Vicálvaro, Valencia, Spain	Clockwise exit and counterclockwise entrance
9	A-3 – Valencia, Spain	
10	Calle de Estrella Polar, Calle de Sirio	Clockwise exit and counterclockwise entrance
11	Plaza Conde de Casal – Parque del Retiro	Clockwise exit and counterclockwise entrance
	Avenida Ciudad de Barcelona, Avenida de la Albufera – Estación de Atocha	Clockwise exit and counterclockwise entrance
	To A-4 / A-42 / Calle de Méndez Alvaro – Córdoba, Toledo	
	Glorieta Pirámides, Glorieta Marqués de Vadillo	
	Paseo de la Ermita del Santo	Counterclockwise exit and entrance
17	Paseo de la Virgen del Puerto, Calle de Segovia, Paseo de Extremadura – Casa de Campo	
18	Plaza España / A-5 – Badajoz	
	Calle de San Pol de Mar	Clockwise exit and entrance
	Calle Santa Fe	Clockwise exit and entrance
20A	Avenida Valladolid, Paseo del Pintor Rosales	Signed as exit 20 counterclockwise
20B	M-500 (Carretera de Castilla)	Signed as exit 20 counterclockwise
	C.P. Agronomos Facultades de Filologia y Estadistica	
23A	A-6 – Madrid, Moncloa	No clockwise exit
23B	A-6 – A Coruña	Signed as exit 23 clockwise
23	Calle de Sinesio Delgado	No counterclockwise exit
	Calle de Arroyofresno, Avenida Ventisquero de la Condesa	Clockwise exit and counterclockwise entrance
	Avenida del Cardenal Herrera Oria / M-605 to M-40 / M-607 – El Pardo, Colmenar Viejo	Clockwise exit and counterclockwise entrance
	M-40 to A-6 – A Coruña	No clockwise exit
	Calle de Cantalejo, Avenida de Miraflores, Avenida Los Pinos, Calle del Dr. Ramón Castroviejo	
	Avenida Ventisquero de la Condesa	
Gap in freeway
	M-607 – Tres Cantos, Colmenar Viejo	
	Paseo de la Castellana, Plaza Castilla – Hospital Universitario La Paz	Counterclockwise exit not accessible from other end of M-30
31B	V. Begona – Fuencarral	Counterclockwise exit and entrance
