= Coslada Dry Port =

Coordinates: 40.431°N 3.571°W

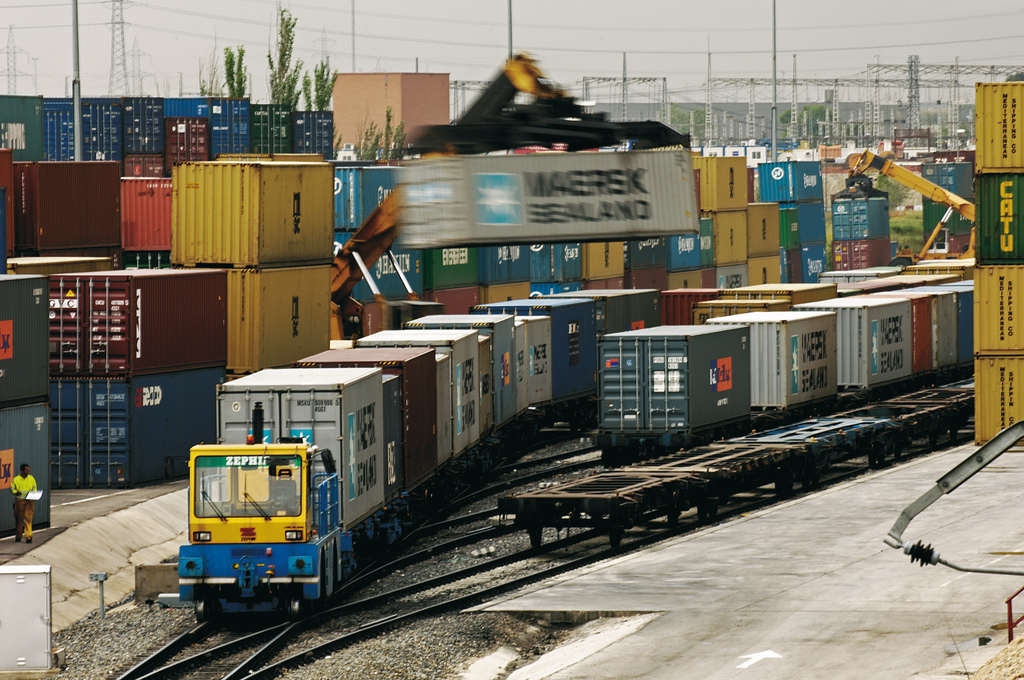

The Dry Port of Madrid, also known as the Dry Port of Coslada, is a logistics platform for the distribution of goods located in the Spanish municipality of Coslada, near Madrid.

== Description ==
The draft project for the dry port traces back to 1995. The start of operations took place in 2001, through the link to the ports of Algeciras, Valencia, Bilbao and Barcelona. The port of Valencia early consolidated as the main synergy hoarder vis-à-vis the activity of the Dry Port of Coslada, amounting for the 92% of the freight volume by 2016. After the purchase of the stocks of Noatum by the Chinese company COSCO Shipping Ports, the management of the terminal, transferred to Conte Rail, became controlled by Cosco. It has its own customs service.
