= Almendra Central =

M-30 map

The Almendra Central (English: Central Almond) is a zone of Madrid comprising seven districts: Centro, Arganzuela, Retiro, Salamanca, Chamartín, Tetuán, and Chamberí, (even though, sometimes, the City Council of Madrid includes part of an eighth, Moncloa-Aravaca, specifically the Argüelles yard, all inside the M30 motorway.

== Population ==
In 1975 1,153,730 people lived there, but since the 1990s, population has decreased steadily: in 2000 there were 915,318 inhabitants and in 2011 847,686.

== Bibliography ==
- Roch Peña, Fernando (May 26, 2008). "La deriva patológica del espacio social en el modelo inmobiliario neoliberal madrileño". Diez años de cambios en el Mundo, en la Geografía y en las Ciencias Sociales, 1999-2008. Universidad de Barcelona.
- Atlas de la Comunidad de Madrid en el umbral del siglo XXI: imagen socioeconómica de una región receptora de inmigrantes en Google Books
- Recuperar Madrid. Madrid: Ayuntamiento de Madrid, 1982. (Oficina Municipal del Plan).
