= Ensanche de Vallecas =

- City neighborhood
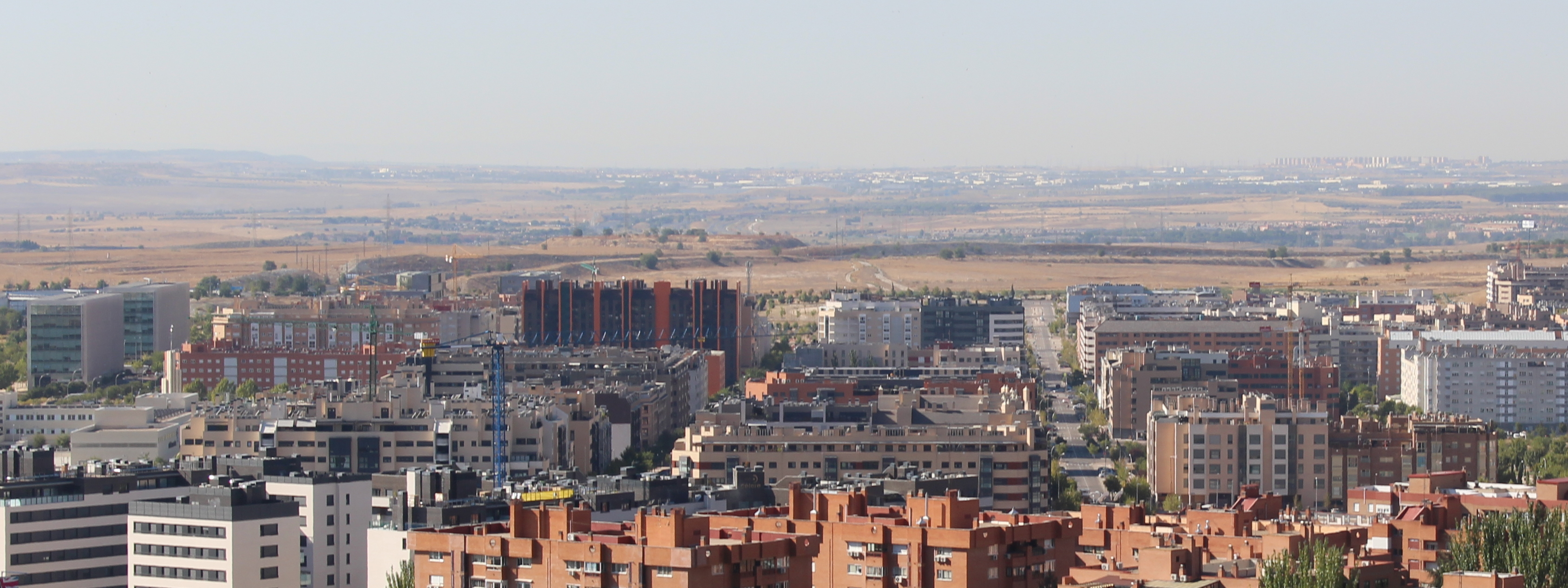
- Interactive map of Ensanche de Vallecas
- Country: Spain
- Region: Community of Madrid
- Municipality: Madrid
- District: Villa de Vallecas

Population (2020)
  - Total: 49,290

Ensanche de Vallecas is an administrative neighborhood of Madrid capital city of Spain. The ward belongs to the district of Villa de Vallecas.

The urbanisation of the area was conceived as a PAU (Programa de Actuación Urbanística) named "Ensanche de Vallecas" within the Casco Histórico de Vallecas neighborhood. In March 2016 a popular vote on the name was carried out. "La Gavia" and "Ensanche de Vallecas" were the two options at stake. As the participation quorum remained below the required minimum (3,774 votes), the result of the consultation, in which 2,960 neighbors took part ("La Gavia", 1801 votes vs. "Ensanche de Vallecas", 1159 votes) was deemed invalid. The formal creation of the administrative neighborhood was approved on 31 May 2017 by the Government Board of the Madrid City Council under the name of "Ensanche de Vallecas". The measure became effective in June. As of 1 February 2020, it has a population of 49,290.
