= Villa de Vallecas =

Coordinates: 40.379597°N 3.621347°W

- District of Madrid
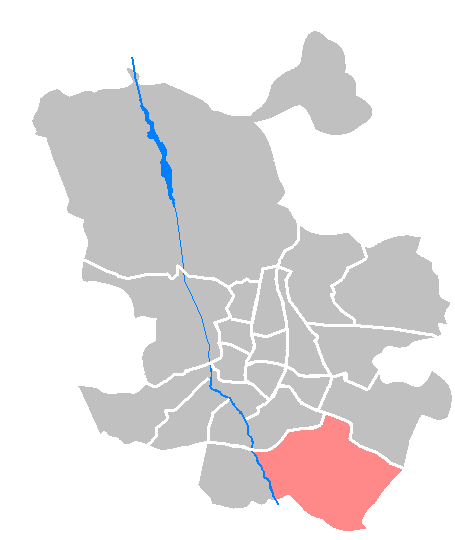
- Country: Spain
- Aut. community: Madrid
- Municipality: Madrid

Government
  - Councillor-President: Carlos González Pereira (PP, 2023)

Population
  - Total: 65,162
- Postal code: 28032
- Madrid district number: 18

Villa de Vallecas ([ˈbiʝa ðe βaˈʝekas], "Village of Vallecas") is one of the 21 districts of the city of Madrid, Spain. It forms, with the district of Puente de Vallecas, the geographical area of Vallecas.

== Geography ==
=== Subdivision ===
The district is administratively divided into 3 wards (Barrios):

- Casco Histórico de Vallecas
- Santa Eugenia
- Ensanche de Vallecas

== See also ==
- Rayo Vallecano
