= Casco Histórico de Vallecas =

Coordinates: 40°21′34″N 3°38′11″W

- Ward of Madrid
- Country: Spain
- Aut. community: Madrid
- Municipality: Madrid
- District: Villa de Vallecas

Casco Histórico de Vallecas is a ward (barrio) of Spain's capital city Madrid. The ward belongs to the district of Villa de Vallecas.
