= Villaviciosa de Odón =

- Municipality
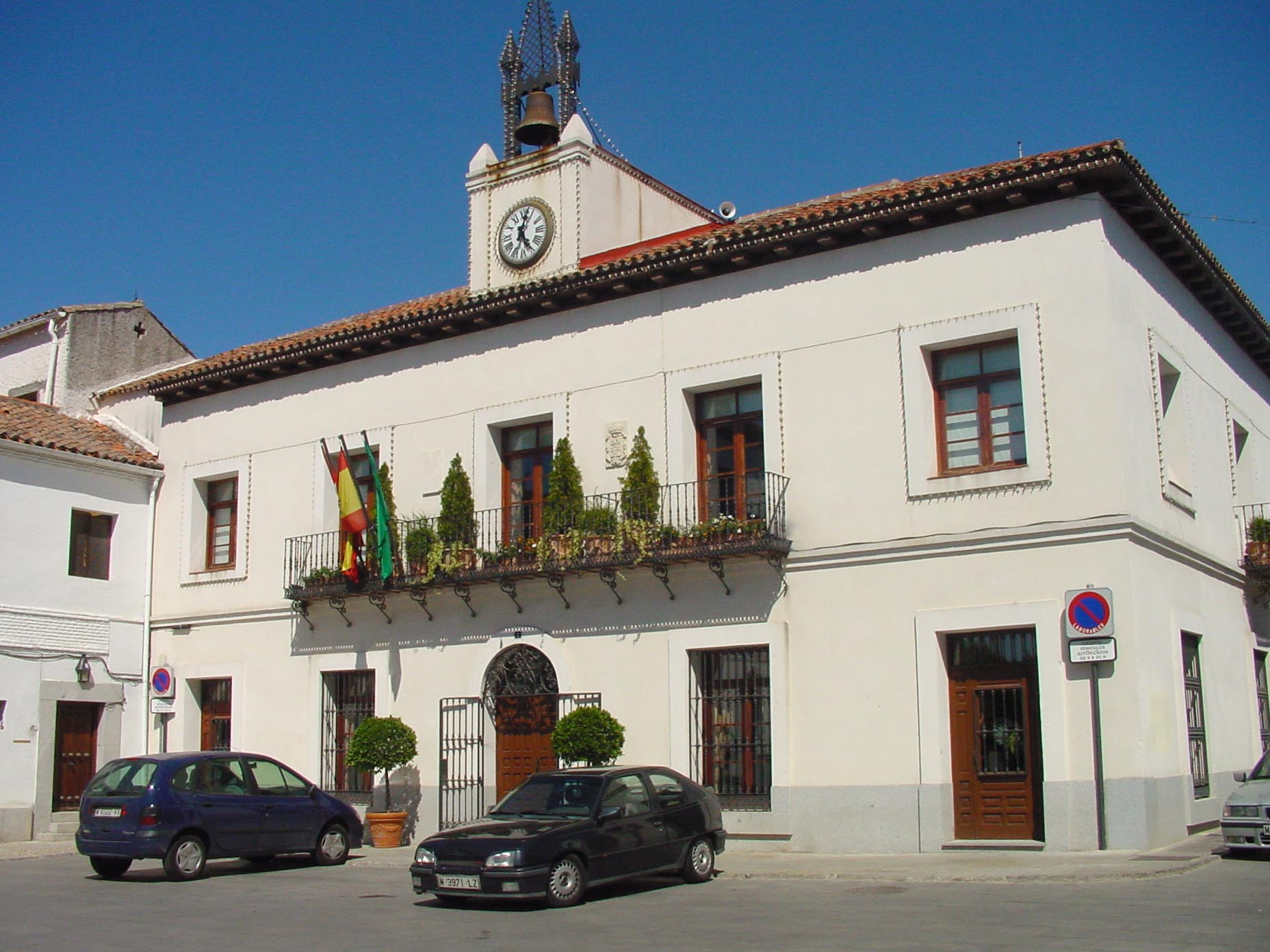
- Town hall

- Flag Coat of arms

- Location of Villaviciosa de Odón

- Location in Spain
- Coordinates: 40°21′30″N 3°54′12″W
- Country: Spain
- Autonomous community: Madrid
- Province: Madrid
- Comarca: Madrid metropolitan area
- Founded: 18th century

Government
  - Mayor: Jose Javier Sanz (Temporary) (PP)

Area
  - Total: 68.17 km^{2} (26.32 sq mi)
- Elevation: 650 m (2,130 ft)

Population (2025-01-01)
  - Total: 30,127
  - Density: 441.9/km^{2} (1,145/sq mi)
- Demonym: Villaodonense
- Time zone: UTC+1 (CET)
  - Summer (DST): UTC+2 (CEST)
- Postal code: 28670-28679
- Official language(s): Spanish
- Website: Official website

Villaviciosa de Odón (Spanish pronunciation: [biʎaβiˈθjosa ðe oˈðon]) is a municipality in the western zone of the Community of Madrid in Spain. The town is located 15 km west of Madrid's city center, in the western zone of the metro area. The Spanish Air Force Museum and the Universidad Europea de Madrid are located within the municipality.

Villaviciosa's quiet lifestyle and its proximity to Madrid propitiated rapid and extensive development during the late 1990s and early 2000s. Because of its proximity to the Universidad Europea de Madrid, it has become a university town, with well-developed residential area and amenities for students. The town contains the Castle of Villaviciosa de Odón.

== History ==
The first news of population formed in the vicinity of Villaviciosa are of the Visigoth era as demonstrates the necropolis found when the splitting of the M-501 road from Villaviciosa until Navas del Rey. We also know that there was a population nucleus on the land now occupied by Villaviciosa; it was the old Calatalifa, this name comes from the Arabic قلعة الخليفة Qal`at al-Khalifa or Castillo del Califa, populated quoted by Ibn Hayyan chronicler in 939, but probably its foundation occurred earlier.

Like many other towns in the Community of Madrid, Calatalifa was occupied by Castilian troops during the Reconquista. The Christian advance, after conquering Mayrit (Madrid), ended with the conquest of Toledo by Alfonso VI. Calatalifa was a settlement of three cultures, Christians, Arabs and Jews at the time, but disappeared towards the end of the thirteenth century.

The population reappears in the mid-fifteenth century already with the name of Odón: a handwritten document dated in 1459 attests to a purchase-sale of land and is preserved in the Town Hall.

Already in the early eighteenth century the name of Villaviciosa appeared on official documents, and even alternate the two names, as we can see in a decree of Felipe V that designates the area as "Real Bosque": "He venido en declarar que el nuevo Bosque de la villa de Odón o Villaviciosa, que es propio del Ynfante don Felipe, mi hijo, y sus límites, con sus aumentos o extensiones que en adelante tuviere, son y han de ser Bosque Real, con todos sus privilegios y libertades".

By 1801, the neighbouring village of Sacedón de Canales had been completely depopulated: those left there moved to Villaviciosa. In this year Villaviciosa annexed the territory of the lost town of Sacedón de Canales.

== See also ==
- List of municipalities in Madrid
