= Coslada =

- Municipality
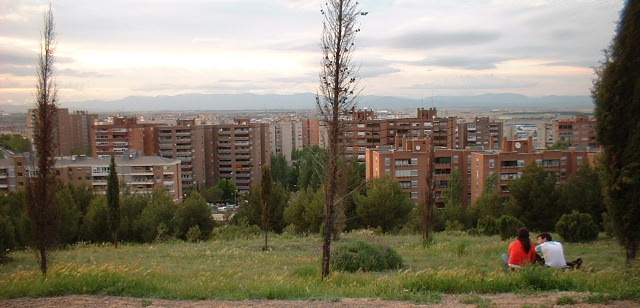

- Flag Coat of arms
- Interactive map of Coslada
- Location within Spain Location within Community of Madrid
- Coordinates: 40°25′34″N 3°33′54″W
- Country: Spain
- Region: Community of Madrid

Government
  - Mayor: Ángel Viveros (2015–present) (PSOE)

Area
  - Total: 11.7 km^{2} (4.5 sq mi)
- Elevation: 621 m (2,037 ft)

Population (2025-01-01)
  - Total: 80,512
  - Density: 6,880/km^{2} (17,800/sq mi)
- Demonym: Cosladeño/a
- Time zone: UTC+1 (CET)
  - Summer (DST): UTC+2 (CEST)
- Postal code: 28821, 28822, 28823
- Dialing code: 91
- Website: Official website

Coslada (Spanish pronunciation: [kosˈlaða]) is a city and municipality in the autonomous community of Madrid in central Spain. It has an area of 11.7 km^{2.}

The Dry Port of the Community of Madrid is located in Coslada, which has become a major logistics hub in the country. Due to the area's close proximity to the Madrid–Barajas Airport and the Dry Port, the stretch of industrial cities from Madrid to Guadalajara along the A-2 freeway (known as the Corredor del Henares and more recently the "golden mile" of online sales) has, since the 1990s, grown into a logistics hub, similar to East Midlands in England, with the entire area now boasting 5.7 million m^{2} of logistics space in total. With investment from foreign funds and socimis, the logistics sector has grown rapidly thanks to increases in internet shopping. As Coslada runs out of space, other logistics companies have started to move into nearby cities such as Marchamalo, San Fernando de Henares, and Torija.

A large percentage of Coslada's population works at the airport. Most Spanish transportation and shipping companies have branch offices in Coslada; the city is host to 706 logistics companies, the most in the country. El Corte Inglés operates a distribution center in the city, and delivery company Nacex opened a new distribution center in November 2018.

As of 2019, the mayor of Coslada is Ángel Viveros (PSOE).

== Demographics ==
Coslada has 102,890 inhabitants. There are 17,000 foreign-born inhabitants, who represent 12% of the total population. Most are Romanians, though there are also small numbers of Chinese, Latin Americans, Guineans, Vietnamese and Indians.

Historical population

Year	Pop.	±%
1842	84	—
1857	420	+400.0%
1877	286	−31.9%
1887	285	−0.3%
1900	260	−8.8%
1910	324	+24.6%
1920	333	+2.8%
1930	513	+54.1%
1940	732	+42.7%

Year	Pop.	±%
1950	897	+22.5%
1960	3,725	+315.3%
1970	13,437	+260.7%
1981	53,730	+299.9%
1991	73,740	+37.2%
2001	77,884	+5.6%
2011	89,155	+14.5%
2021	81,388	−8.7%

Source: National Statistics Institute

== Location and transportation ==
- Coslada is located at 40.25° North, 3.32° West.
- 12 kilometres east of downtown Madrid, Coslada is part of the metropolitan area.
- The city is surrounded by other municipalities such as Madrid and San Fernando de Henares.
- Coslada is covered and connected to the Madrid metropolitan area by the line (L7) of the Madrid Metro in May 2007, local and regional bus lines, commuter train lines (C-1, C-2 and C-7) and several major freeways (A-2 (Madrid-Barcelona), M-40, M-45, M-50) and toll highways (R-3).

== Health care ==
The Hospital Universitario del Henares, located in Coslada, provides medical attention to the municipality as well as to San Fernando de Henares, Mejorada del Campo, Loeches and Velilla de San Antonio.

== Notable people ==
- Dani Parejo, footballer
- Amaia Salamanca, actress
