= Madrid metropolitan area =

Comprises the city of Madrid and twenty surrounding municipalities

Satellite view of Madrid and surroundings

The Madrid metropolitan area is a monocentric metropolitan area in the centre of the Iberian peninsula, around the municipality of Madrid, Spain. It is not related to any sort of administrative delimitation, and thus, its limits are ambiguous.

According to data from the OECD it has an estimated 2021 population of 6,980,646 people and covers an area of 5,335.97 square kilometres (2,060.23 sq mi). It is considered the largest metropolitan area in Spain, the 2nd largest in the European Union and the 54th largest in the world.

Two distinct zones of urbanisation can be distinguished extending further than the municipality of Madrid:

- Inner ring (primera corona): Alcorcón, Leganés, Getafe, Móstoles, Fuenlabrada, Coslada, Alcobendas, Pozuelo de Alarcón, San Fernando de Henares
- Outer ring (segunda corona): Villaviciosa de Odón, Parla, Pinto, Valdemoro, Rivas-Vaciamadrid, Torrejón de Ardoz, Alcalá de Henares, San Sebastián de los Reyes, Tres Cantos, Las Rozas de Madrid, Majadahonda, Boadilla del Monte, Collado Villalba.

According to the issue 39 of the Economic Barometer of the City of Madrid, which divides a Madrid "metropolitan region" in 5 areas, the 3rd area exceeds the administrative limits of the Community of Madrid. The largest suburbs are to the south, and in general along the main motorways leading out of Madrid.

The GDP of the metropolitan area of Madrid was estimated to be €210 billion in 2020 and represents over 95% of the GDP of the region of Madrid. The GDP per capita was 37,758 euros in the metropolitan area while it reached 30,453 euros for the Madrid region, the Community of Madrid.

In regard to the Madrid functional urban area (FUA), that is, the wider commuting zone, the territory has experienced by the turn of the 21st century an increase of extensive suburbanisation with a larger share of inhabitants living more than 25km away from the functional urban centre as well as the deepening of the traditional NW-SE socio-spatial segregation pattern. Another challenge is the lack of environmental sustainability of the current mobility model.
