= European University of Madrid =

Private university in Madrid, Spain

European University
- Universidad Europea
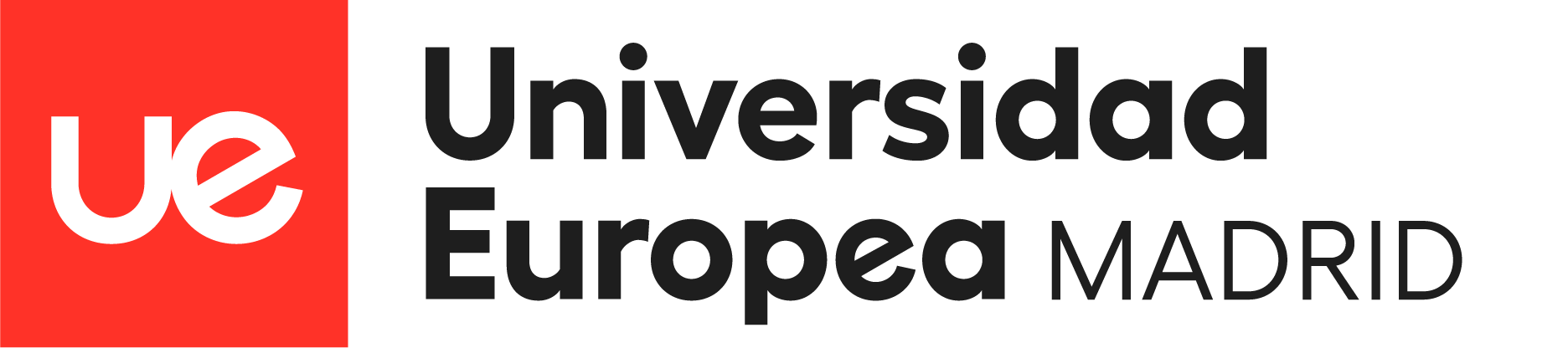
- Type: Private, for-profit
- Established: 1995
- President: Otilia de la Fuente
- Rector: Elena Gazapo
- Students: More than 16,000
- Location: C/ Tajo, s/n, Villaviciosa de Odón, Madrid, 28670, Spain
- Campus: Others in: Alcobendas, Community of Madrid), Valencia and Canary Islands
- Colours: Black, maroon, and white
- Website: universidadeuropea.com/en/

The European University (Spanish: Universidad Europea) is a private university in Spain with campuses in Madrid, Valencia, and the Canary Islands.

== History ==
Founded in 1995, the school was purchased in 1999 by Sylvan Learning Systems, Inc. In 2004, Sylvan Learning Systems later changed its name to Laureate Education Inc.

Laureate Education sold the university to Permira in 2019 for €770 million. In 2024, Permira sold a majority stake in the university to the infrastructure arm of EQT AB with a valuation in excess of €2 billion, with Permira retaining a minority stake.

During 2010/2011 the University has adapted almost all the teachings it offers to the European Higher Education Area.

University rankings

Global – Overall
- QS World: 901-950 (2026)

=== Rectors ===
From	To	Rector
1995	2001	Juan Salcedo Martínez
2001	2004	Fernando Fernández Méndez de Andés
2004	2009	Antonio Bañares Cañizares
2009	2015	Águeda Benito Capa
2015	2017	Isabel Fernández Martínez
2017	2017	Miguel Gómez Navarro (En funciones)
2017	2019	Juan Morote Sarrión
2019	Present	Elena Gazapo

== Campuses ==
=== Madrid ===
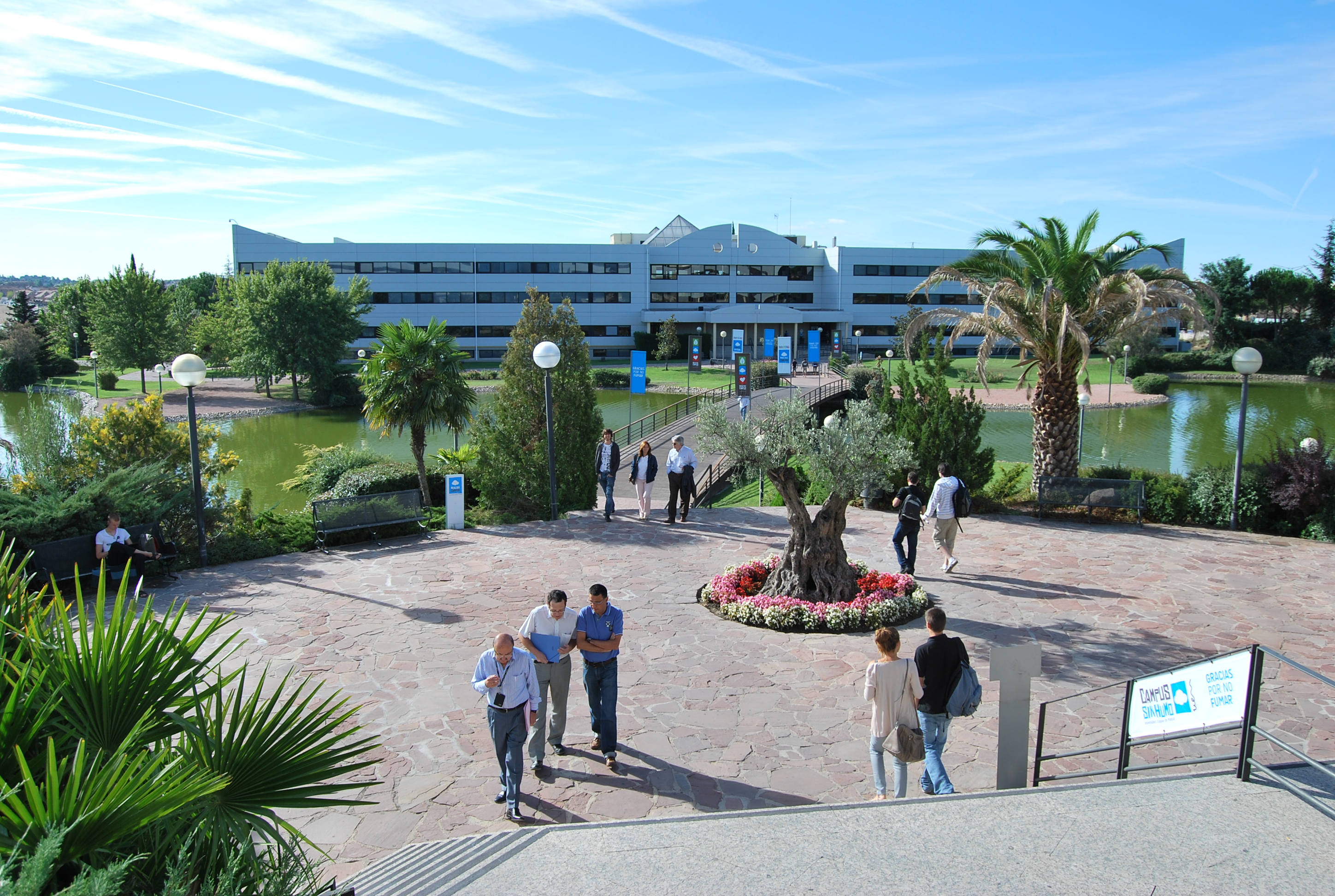
European University campus in Madrid.

=== Valencia ===
The European University has two campuses in the Valencian Community, in Valencia and Alicante. The campus in Valencia opened on 11 June 2024.

== Alumni ==
- Andrés Otero, Chilean politician
- Lluvia Rojo, Spanish actress and singer
- Miguel Angel Vivas, Spanish director
