= San Fernando de Henares =

- Municipality
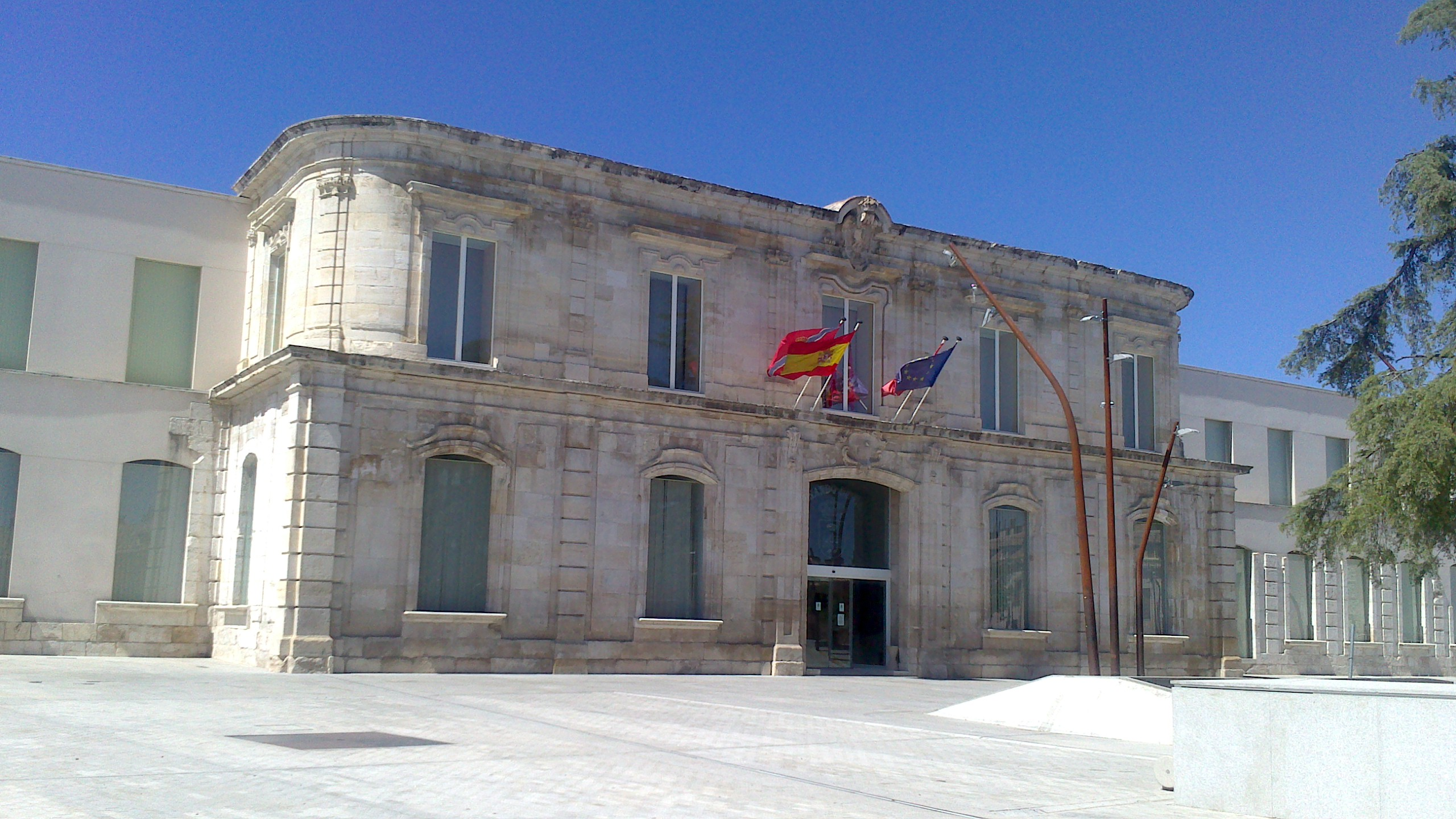
- Town hall

- Flag Coat of arms

- Location of San Fernando de Henares within the Community of Madrid
- Coordinates: 40°25′32″N 3°32′7″W
- Country: Spain
- Region: Community of Madrid
- Comarca: Madrid metropolitan area
- Founded: 1746

Government
  - Alcalde: Cati Rodriguez (2015) (San Fernando de Henares sí puede (SFHSP))

Area
  - Total: 39.29 km^{2} (15.17 sq mi)
- Elevation: 580 m (1,900 ft)

Population (2025-01-01)
  - Total: 39,059
  - Density: 994.1/km^{2} (2,575/sq mi)
- Demonym: Sanfernandinos
- Time zone: UTC+1 (CET)
  - Summer (DST): UTC+2 (CEST)
- Postal code: 28830
- Dialing code: 91
- Website: Official website

San Fernando de Henares is a municipality in Spain, in the province and autonomous community of Madrid. It has an area of 39.9 km^{2} and 38,904 inhabitants (2022). Its agricultural production includes olives, cereals, vegetables, cattle and wool. Its industries include metalworking, mechanical engineering, food processing and graphic arts.

== History ==
Location in the Community of Madrid

In 1746 King Philip V bought the area where San Fernando now stands to install a royal fabric factory. After the king's death shortly thereafter, the project was developed by Ferdinand VI, who appointed Ventura de Argumosa as the governor of the Royal Place.

Around the factory workers' dwellings were built, which resulted in the origin of the town. In front of the factory a great square was opened (at present named Plaza de España) which was linked with another now named Plaza de Fernando VI. The whole area has been recently declared a historic and artistic monument so it cannot be modified, to protect the original houses that still remain.

Throughout its 200-year history, the municipality has suffered ups and downs. Its emblematic building, the factory, has been intended for several uses, notably as a hospice. Currently only the main façade stands; has been restored and incorporated into the new city hall.

== Communications ==
- Direct access form the A II (km 15) and the M-40 and M-45 highways (Exits 27 and 32, respectively)
- Public transport
  - Bus from Madrid, (Avenida de América, Ciudad Líneal and Vicálvaro) línes 281 to 289)
  - Also UR-2 and U-1 lines into the city.
  - Metro station.

== Politics ==
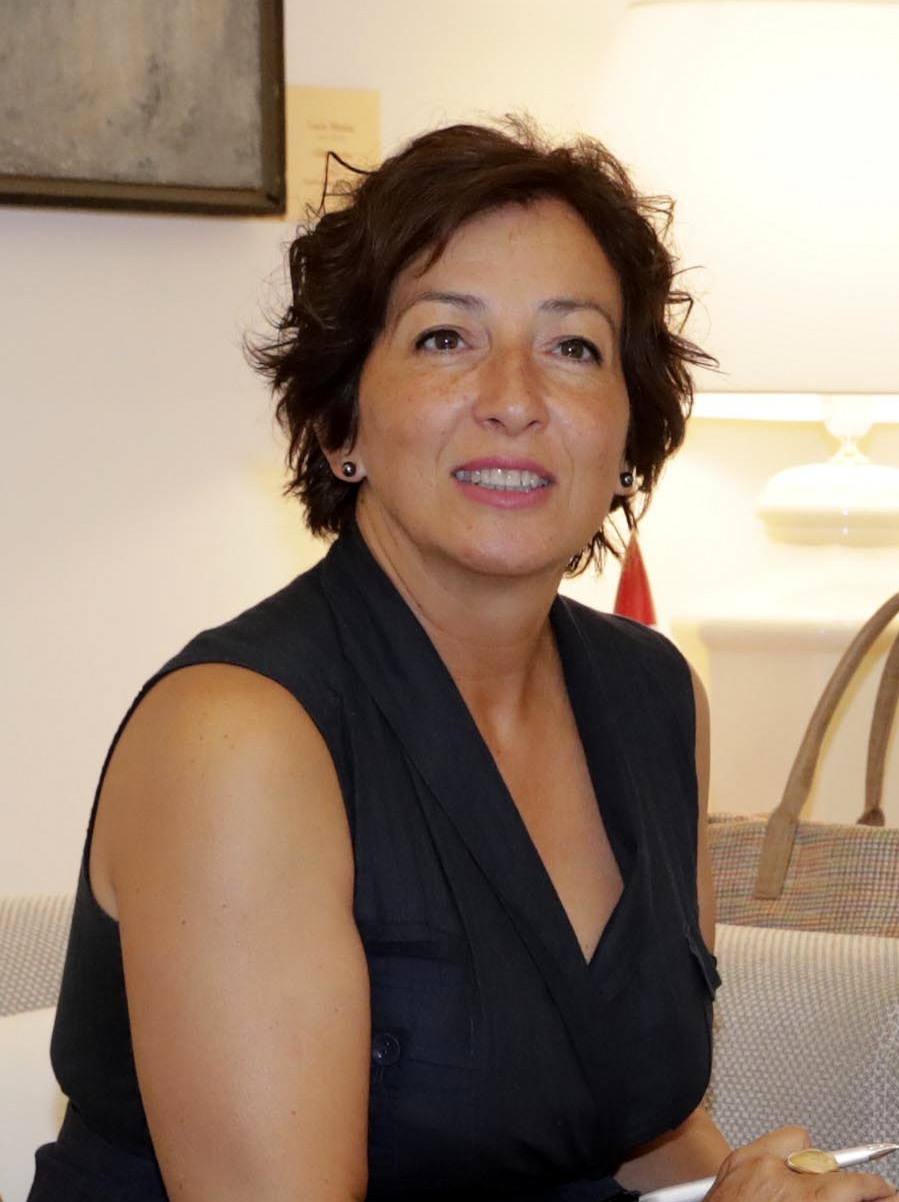
Cati Rodríguez Morcillo, mayor of San Fernando de Henares.

Local election results in San Fernando de Henares
Party	2007	2011	2015	2019	2023
United Left (IU)	8	10	4	1	0
People's Party (PP)	8	8	6	3	6
Spanish Socialist Workers' Party (PSOE)	6	4	4	6	12
Podemos	-	-	5	1	0
España 2000	-	1	1	1	-
Ciudadanos	-	-	-	5	0
Más Madrid	-	-	-	2	2
Vox	-	-	-	1	1
Actúa-Gira Madrid-Los Verdes	-	-	-	1	-

== Twin towns – sister cities ==
San Fernando de Henares is twinned with:

- Vaslui, Romania
