= Timeline of Mexican War of Independence =

Mexican War of Independence
- Part of the Spanish American wars of independence
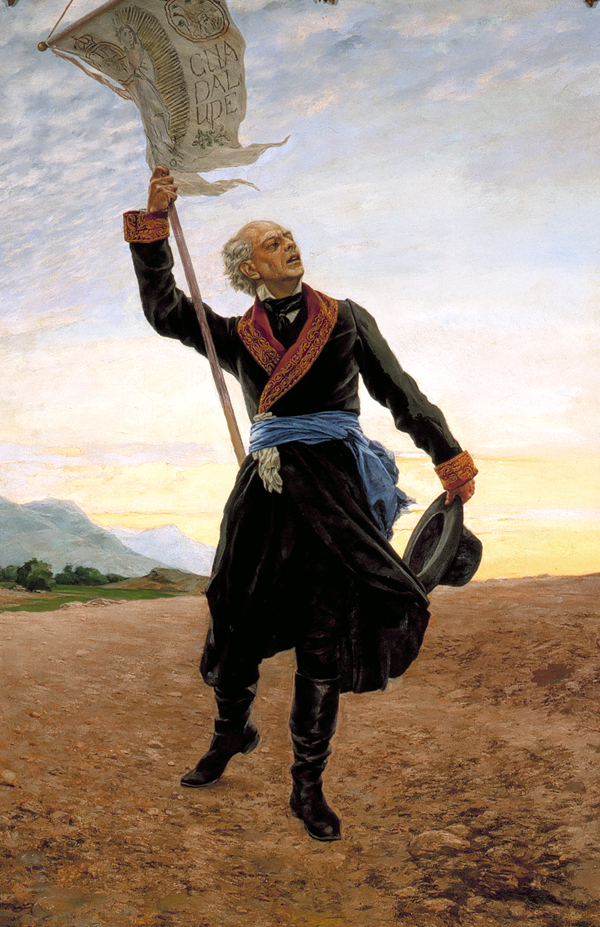
- Miguel Hidalgo waving a banner bearing the image of the Virgin of Guadalupe, patron saint of Mexico.
Date	16 September 1810 – 27 September 1821 (11 years, 1 week and 4 days)
Location	Mexico
Result	Insurgent victory: Treaty of Córdoba; First Mexican Empire is established; Signing of the Declaration of Independence of the Mexican Empire
Territorial changes	Spain loses the continental area of Viceroyalty of New Spain with the exception of the port San Juan de Ulúa, Veracruz

The following is a partial timeline (1810–1812) of the Mexican War of Independence (1810–1821), its antecedents and its aftermath. The war pitted the royalists, supporting the continued adherence of Mexico to Spain, versus the insurgents advocating Mexican independence from Spain. After a struggle of more than 10 years the insurgents prevailed.

== Background ==
The Mexican War of Independence was an attempt, ultimately successful, led by Mexican-born Spaniards, called "criollos", to shake off the rule of Spain and the political and social dominance in Mexico of a small number of Spanish-born people living in Mexico, called "peninsulares" or derisively "gachupines." The war began in 1810, led by a small group of criollos in the Bajio region who were supported by a large number of mixed-blood mestizos and indigenous people.

In 1810, a tax official calculated that New Spain (Mexico plus California, the American Southwest, and Texas) had a population of 6.1 million people, of which 18 percent or 1,097,928 were Spaniards. Of the Spanish only about 15,000 had been born in Spain and, thus, were peninsulares. The remainder on the Spaniards, the criollos, had been born in Mexico. The greatest concentration of peninsulares was in the capital of Mexico City. The non-Spanish 82 percent of the population consisted of 22 percent mestizo (people with descent from both indigenous peoples and Spaniards) and other mixed-blood peoples, and 60 percent members of one of many indigenous (American Indian) groups.

The rigid casta system in Spanish colonies is important for understanding the origins of the independence movements in Mexico and other Latin American colonies.

== 1799 ==
- November 10. Thirteen young men of modest means and humble families, led by Pedro de la Portilla, were ordered arrested by Viceroy Miguel José de Azanza in Mexico City on grounds of fomenting a 105th rebellion against Spanish rule. The event was called the Conspiracy of the Machetes because the young men had only two guns and 100 machetes and sabers to carry out their plan to assault the palace and take the viceroy prisoner. The group was betrayed by one of their number. They were sentenced to prison. Portilla lived long enough to see Mexico gain its independence. The conspiracy is considered a precursor of the independence movement and illustrates the enmity between criollos and the ruling class of peninsulares."

== 1808 ==
- June 6. Napoleon Bonaparte of France installed his brother Joseph Bonaparte as king of Spain. A revolt, called the Peninsular War, against the French occupation of Spain intensified. Spanish colonies overseas questioned the legitimacy of the Spanish government. The Viceroy of New Spain, José de Iturrigaray, and his council in Mexico City affirmed their support for the deposed Spanish king, Ferdinand VII, and refused to accept French representation in the council.
- August 25. A Peruvian-born priest, Melchor de Talamantes, wrote a paper to the city council of Mexico City asserting reasons that justified a colony claiming independence from its home country. Those reasons included secession when the home country was dominated by another country, as Spain was by France, and when popular sentiment favored independence.
- September 16. Viceroy Iturrigaray was deposed in a coup d'etat by the peninsulares. Although born in Spain, Iturrigaray was considered pro-criollo and his removal from office was illustrative of the ongoing political conflict between Spaniard-born peninsulares and Mexican-born criollos.

== 1809 ==
- December 21. The Mexican authorities uncovered the "Conspiracy of Valladolid" in what is today Morelia, Michoacan. The conspirators were a group of mostly military officers headed by José Mariano Michelena and José Maria Garcia Obeso. The movement began in the city of Valladolid (today Morelia, Michoacan). The conspirators intended to establish a junta in Mexico City, repudiating any attempt by France to exercise influence in Mexico and ruling in the name of the deposed Spanish monarch, Ferdinand VII. The conspirators were betrayed and arrested. The punishment meted out to them was moderate, with the leaders being sentenced to a comfortable incarceration. The conspiracy was a criollo movement that stopped short of declaring Mexican independence from Spain.

== 1810 ==
- September 9. The colonial government of New Spain heard glimmerings of the Queretaro conspiracy. The conspiracy aimed to overthrow the rule of the Peninsulares and their replacement by Criollos. The pretext for the insurrection was the fear that the Peninsulares would turn the rule of Mexico over to the French. The tentacles of the conspiracy had spread from the city of Queretaro throughout the Bajio region. The conspirators included military officers Ignacio Allende and Juan Aldama, the Roman Catholic priest Miguel Hidalgo, and the Mayor (Corregidor) of Queretaro, Miguel Dominguez, and his wife Josefa Ortiz de Dominguez, called "la Corregidora." Hidalgo was selected as the leader of the conspiracy, partially because it was believed he could attract the mestizos and indigenous people of the Bajio to the cause. The date planned for the beginning of the insurrection was October 2.
- September 15. La Corregidora in Queretaro learned the government had begun arresting conspirators. She sent messengers, Ignacio Perez and Juan Aldama, to Dolores, some 85 kilometres (53 miles) distant, to warn Hidalgo. Allende was visiting Hidalgo in Dolores.

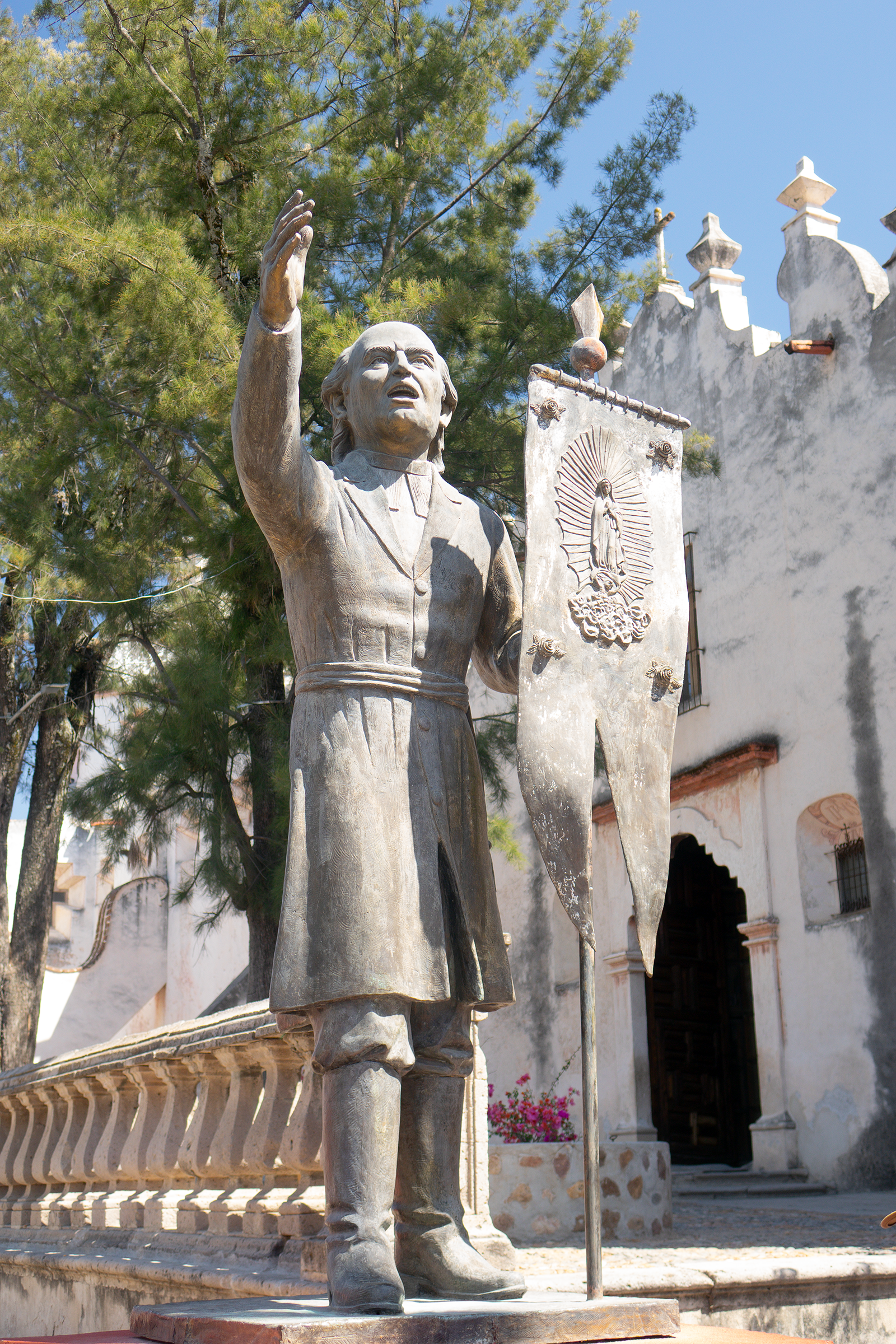
Father Miguel Hidalgo y Costilla with the movement's banner; statue in Atotonilco

- September 16. At 2 a.m. Hidalgo and Allende were awakened by Aldama and advised that the conspiracy was in danger of being quashed by the government. Meeting with other conspirators, they decided to initiate the revolt immediately. In the early morning Hidalgo rang the church bells, assembled his followers to worship, and made a speech, the "grito" or Cry of Dolores, which set in motion the Mexican War of Independence. Hidalgo affirmed support for King Ferdinand VII and demanded the end of economic abuses by peninsulares. Accounts differ as to whether he called for the full independence of Mexico from Spain. Hidalgo and his followers, 500 to 800 men, took over Dolores and advanced southward. By nightfall, they took control of San Miguel de Allende, home town of Allende and Aldama. Along the way Hidalgo raised a banner with an image of the Virgin of Guadalupe, who became the symbolic leader of the insurgency.
- September 19. Outside the city of Celaya, Hidalgo and Allende sent a letter to the city government threatening to "cut the throats of seventy-eight Europeans" held prisoners if the insurgent army was fired upon.
- September 24. The Bishop of Michoacan excommunicated Hidalgo, Allende, Aldama, and Mariano Abasolo.
- September 28. Conquering cities and gathering more men as he marched, Hidalgo and his army of 25,000, primarily indigenous people and mestizos, defeated the defenders of Guanajuato City, storming the fortified granary (Alhóndiga de Granaditas). They sacked the city and slaughtered many inhabitants.
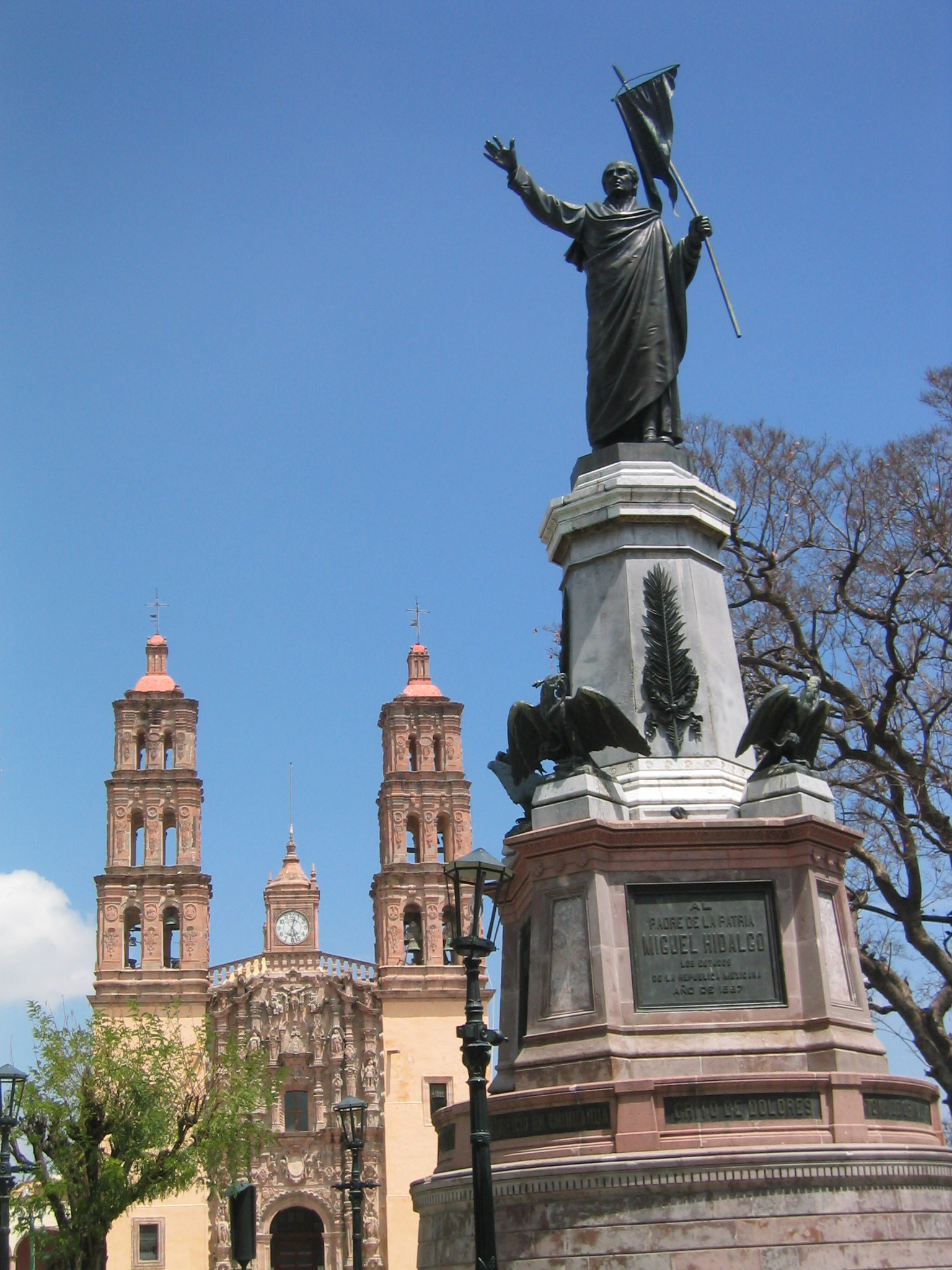
Statue of Hidalgo and the church of the "grito."

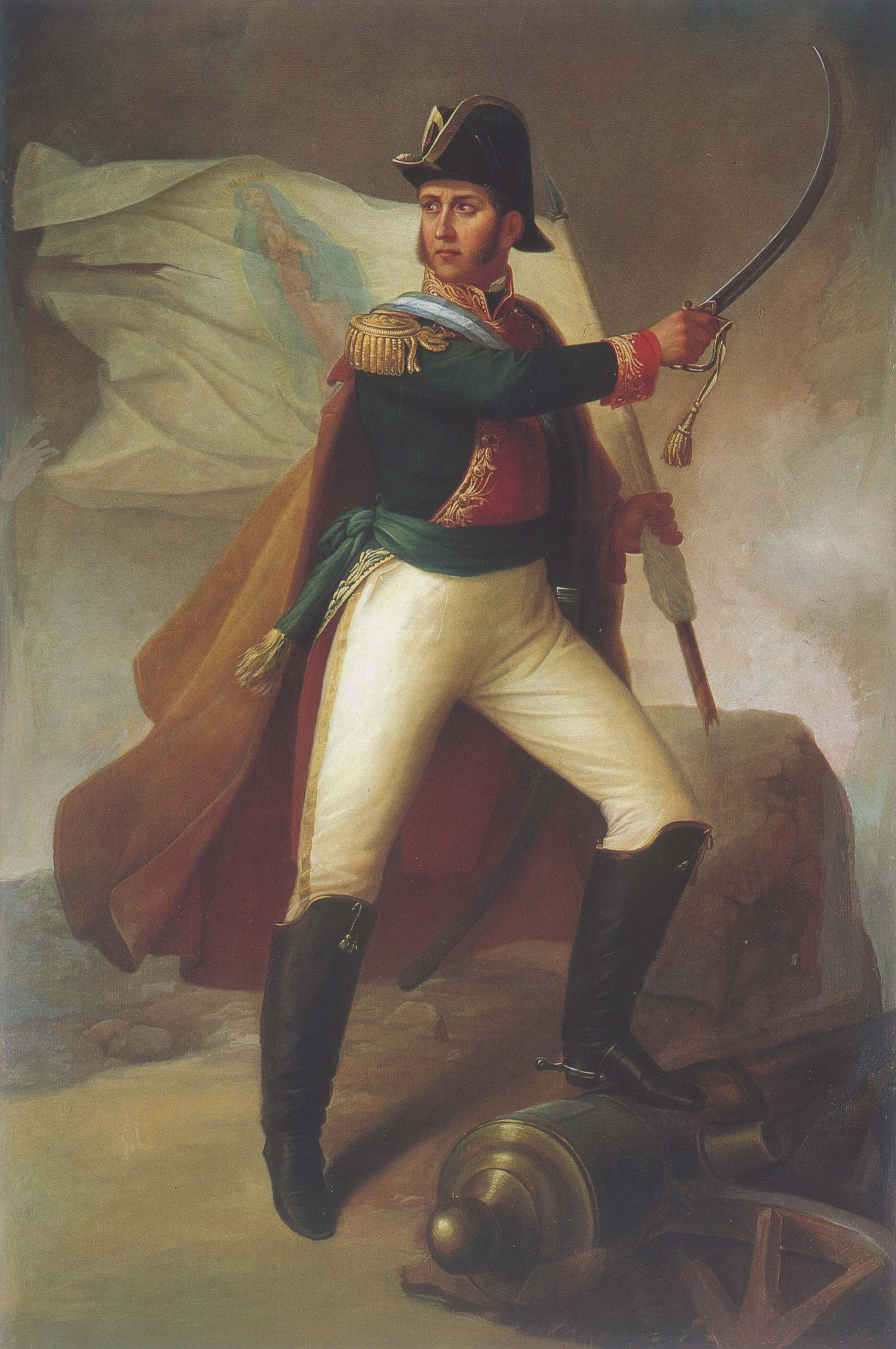
Ingnacio Allende

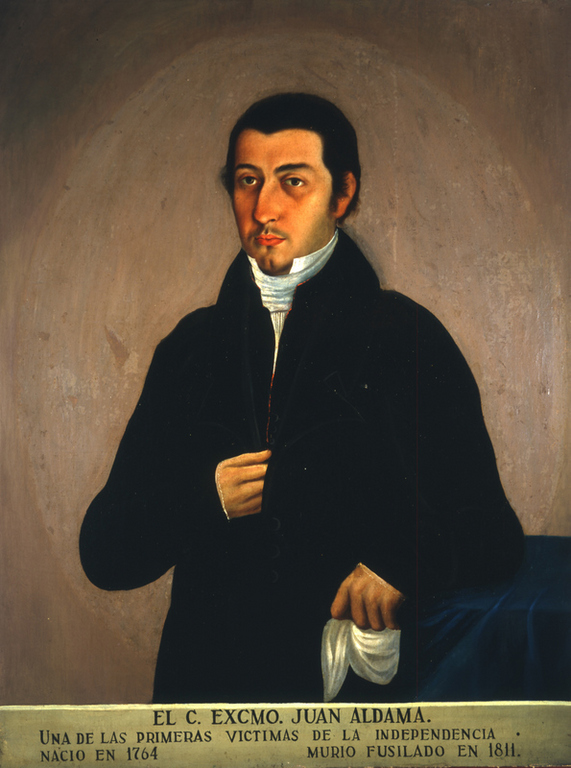
Juan Aldama

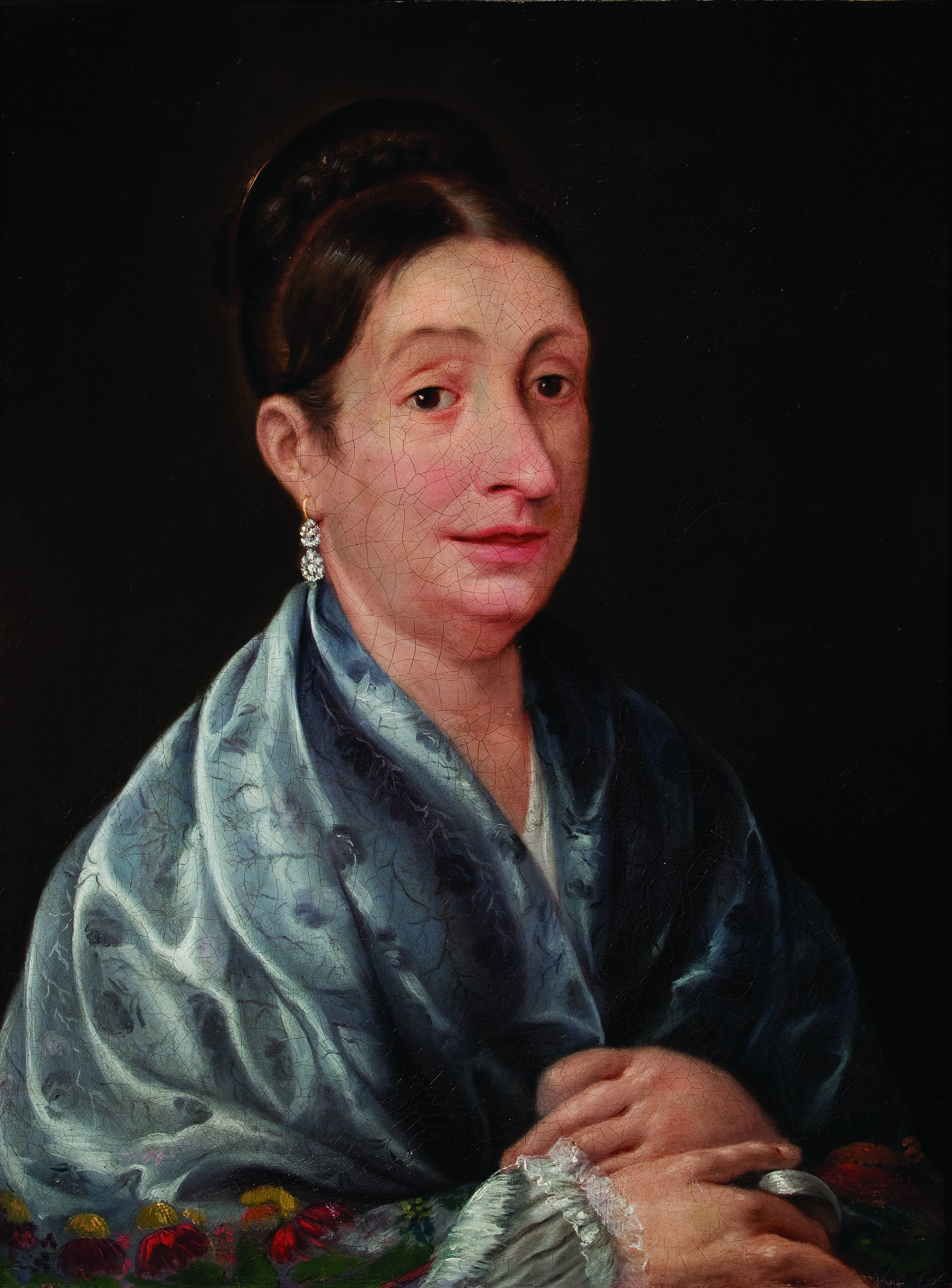
Josefa Ortiz de Dominguez.

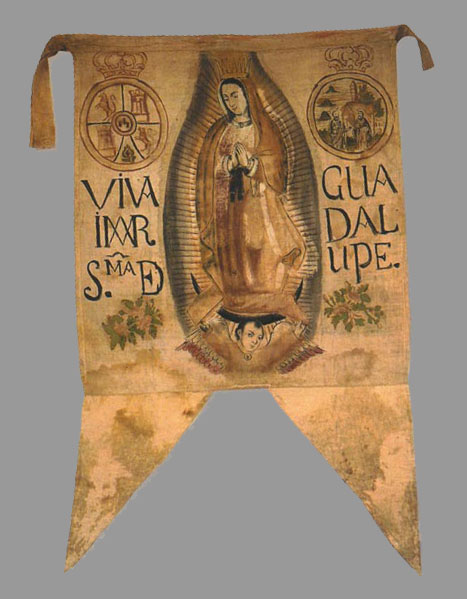
The banner carried by Hidalgo.

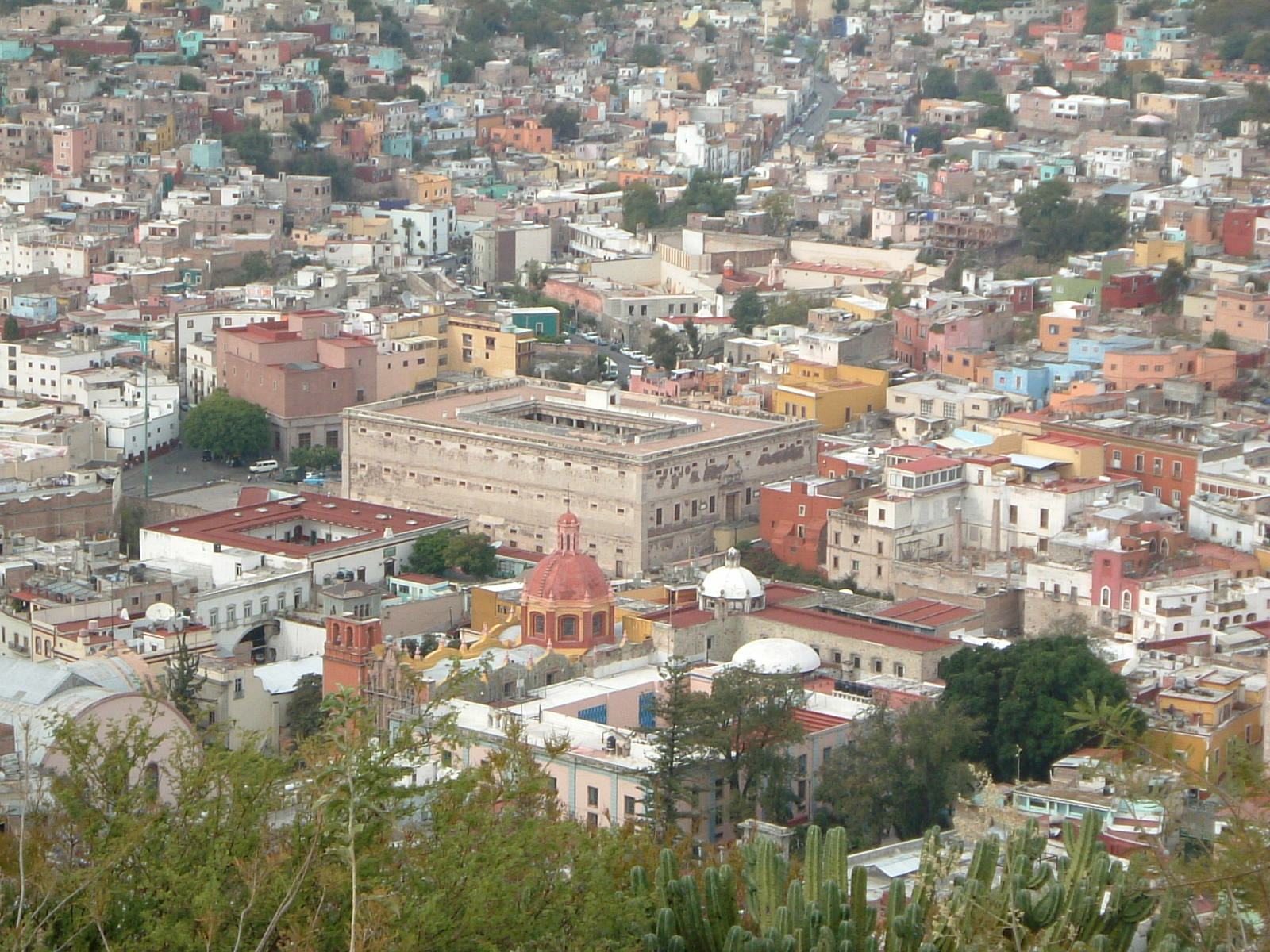
The granary (center) in Guanajuato.

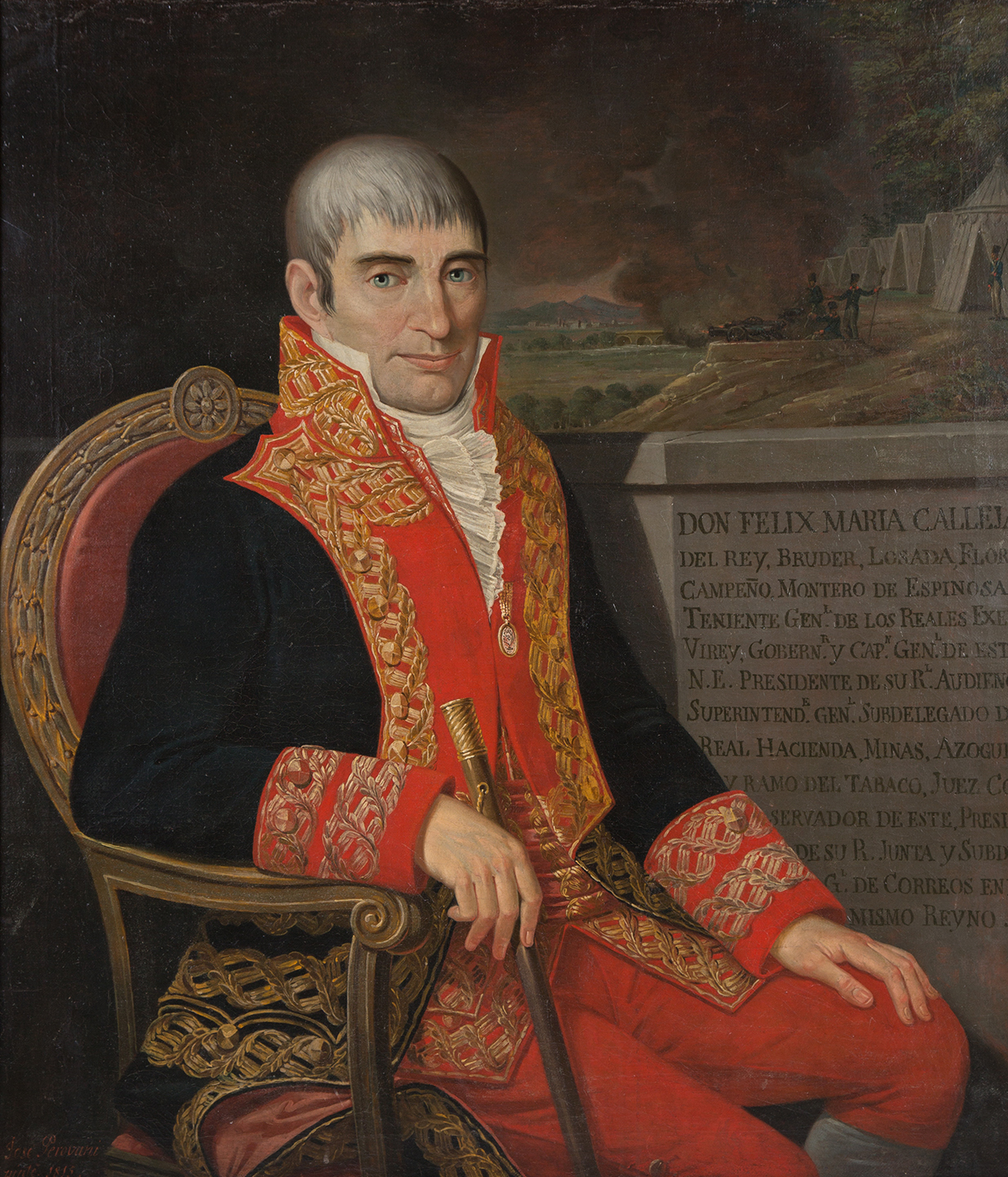
Félix Maria Calleja.
- October 25. In support of Hidalgo, a mestizo priest, José María Morelos, started a military campaign to expel the Spaniards from the state of Guerrero. This came to be called "Morelos' First Campaign." Initially he had only 25 men, but he quickly added many more as he progressed. Unlike Hidalgo, Morelos invested time and effort in training his men. He imposed strict discipline and forbade looting.
- October 30. Marching toward Mexico City with a disorganized army of 60 to 80 thousand men, Hidalgo defeated a much smaller royalist army in the Battle of Monte de las Cruces. With his army in the outskirts of Mexico City, Hidalgo inexplicably ordered a retreat. The insurgent army had suffered heavy casualties in the battle and many desertions afterwards and failed to gain much support from the Criollos, indigenous people, and mestizos in and near the capital city.
- November 7. With an army reduced to about 40,000 men, Hidalgo was defeated by a royalist army of 7,000 at Aculco.
- November 9. José Antonio Torres, a mestizo, secured the surrender of Guadalajara, the second city of Mexico, to insurgent forces.
- November 19. Ignacio Allende proposed to Hidalgo that the insurgents concentrate their forces in Guanajuato. He said that the royalist forces were advancing and public opinion "may shortly be converted into a hatred for us and for our government." Hidalgo ignored Allende's recommendation and advanced toward Guadalajara.
- November 24. Allende and his soldiers were forced by royalist pressure to abandon Guanajuato. After his departure a mob killed 138 peninsulares who had earlier been taken prisoner.
- November 26. Hidalgo and 7,000 followers entered Guadalajara in triumph, the entry to the city prepared by Torres. Hidalgo began setting up the machinery of government in Guadalajara and appealed to criollos, mestizos, and indigenous people to support the insurgency. During December, Hidalgo dropped the fiction that the insurgency supported ousted Spanish king Ferdinand VII and openly declared that the goal was complete independence for Mexico.
- December 12. Suspecting a plot against his rule, Hidalgo ordered the execution of at least 350 Spanish-born peninsulares in Guadalajara. Allende, who had joined Hidalgo in Guadalajara, contemplated poisoning Hidalgo to "end the evil he was doing."

== 1811 ==
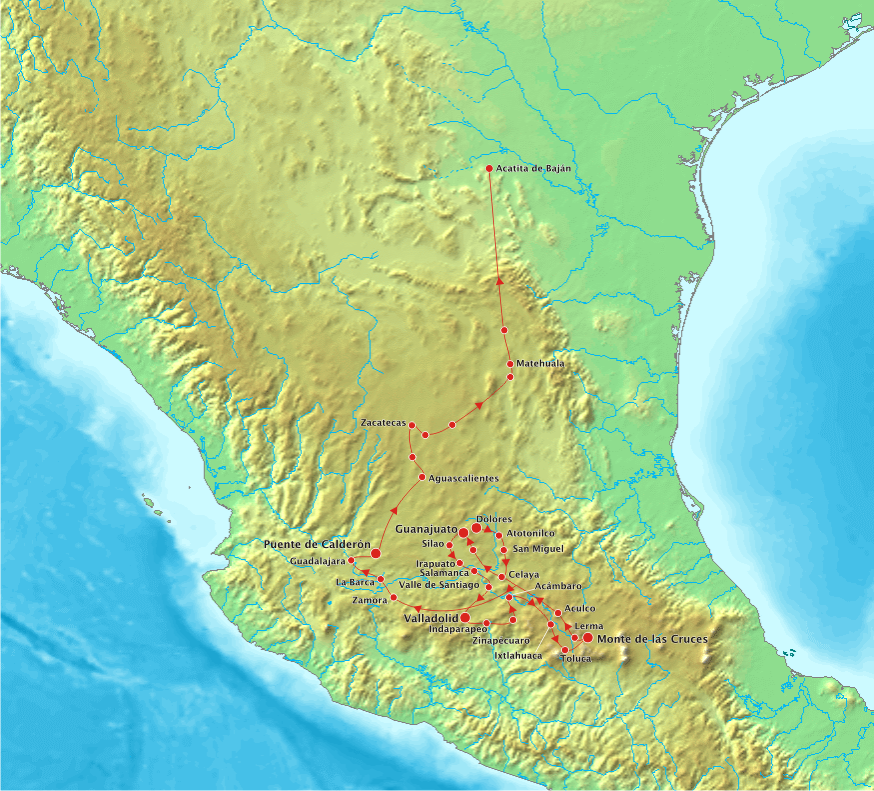
The route of Miguel Hidalgo's military campaigns, 1810–1811.

- January 8. A priest from Guadalajara and former supporter of Hidalgo published a manifesto in Mexico City stating that the insurgent army was "a growing mob of robbers and assassins encouraged...by the monstrous Hidalgo."
- January 8. Insurgent leader José Mariano Jiménez, operating independently of Hidalgo and Allende, entered the city of Saltillo with an army of 7,000 men. Jimenéz and sent out military units to take control of other areas of northern Mexico.
- January 14. Aware that a royalist army under the command of Félix María Calleja del Rey was advancing on Guadalajara, Allende and Mariano Abasolo led the insurgent army out of the city at to a plain near Calderon Bridge where they planned to meet the oncoming royalists.
- January 17. In the Battle of Calderon Bridge, 6,000 well armed and disciplined royalist soldiers defeated the insurgent army of up to 100,000 poorly armed and untrained men. This was a decisive battle; afterwards the insurgent leaders and their diminished number of loyal soldiers were on the run, pursued by the royalists.
- January 21. The Casas Revolt in Texas overturned royalist rule and the insurgents ruled Texas for 39 days before a counter-coup upset them.
- January 24–25. In flight after the Battle of Calderon Bridge, insurgent leaders met at the Pabellon hacienda, near Aguascalientes. Hidalgo was stripped of his command, and Allende was selected to replace him. However, the decision was kept secret, with Hidalgo remaining the puppet leader. Hidalgo became a virtual prisoner, warned that he would be executed if he attempted to leave the army.
- February 24. The main body of the insurgent army, led by Allende, arrived in Saltillo to join Jiménez who had taken control of many areas in northern Mexico. The objective of the insurgents was to continue their retreat to the United States where they hoped to find support for Mexican independence.
- March 17. Rebel leaders Allende, Jiménez, and Aldama, Hidalgo, and more than 1,000 soldiers of the insurgent army departed Saltillo to march north to Monclova to continue their flight toward the United States. Not anticipating opposition, the caravan was strung out on the road over a distance of 24 kilometres (15 miles).
- March 21. The insurgent leaders and most of their men were taken captive at the Wells of Baján. The nearly-bloodless capture was engineered by Ignacio Elizondo who had feigned support for the rebels while working for the royalists. He lured the insurgents into a trap.
- March 26. Ignacio López Rayón, left behind in Saltillo after the departure of Hidalgo and Allende, abandoned the city and led 3,500 men with 22 cannons southward, seeking a refuge from the advancing royalist armies. With the capture of the insurgent leaders at the Wells of Baján, he became the de facto leader of the independence movement.
- June 26. Ignacio Allende, Jose Mariano Jimenez, Juan Aldama, and Manuel Santamaria were executed in Chihuahua City.
- July 30. Miguel Hidalgo was executed in Chihuahua City. The heads of Hidalgo and other insurgent leaders were taken to Guanajuato and displayed at the granary as a warning to others contemplating revolution.
- August 15. The end of Morelos' First Campaign. After an unsuccessful siege of Acapulco, Morelos captured other cities such as Chilpancingo, Tixtla, and Chilapa and wrested control of much of the southern Pacific coast of Mexico from the royalists.
- August 19. After a long flight southward and many skirmishes with royalist forces, Rayón found a safe-haven in Zitacuaro, Michoacan and formed a revolutionary government, the "Junta of Zitacuaro," headed by himself. Among the members of the Junta was José Maria Morelos, the leader of the insurgent forces in the state of Guerrero. The junta never became effective because the insurgency had fragmented into four areas, each controlled by a different leader.
- November 15. José Maria Morelos began his "second campaign" to relieve Spanish military pressure on Zitacuaro and to threaten Mexico City and Puebla.

== 1812 ==
- January 2. Félix María Calleja led royalist troops in an attack on Rayón's stronghold of Zitacuaro.
- January 5. With the conquest of Zitacuaro, Calleja ordered all the inhabitants to leave and burned the city to the ground. Rayón escaped from the royalist army and took refuge in Tlalpujahua, Michoacan.
- February 19. The siege of Cuautla began. Morelos had 4,000 soldiers to defend the town; the royalist Calleja had about double that number of men.
- April 30. Rayón forwarded to Morales a copy of a constitution that he and other members of the Junta de Zitacuaro had written. The draft constitution acknowledged the Spanish king, Ferdinand VII, as the titular head of Mexico, but otherwise advocated full independence for Mexico, plus advocating the abolishment of slavery and the rigid caste system, and establishing freedom of the press.
- May 2. The Siege of Cuautla ended with Morelos fighting his way out of the town with his army. Morelos and part of his army escaped but 3,000 of the insurgents and their civilian supporters were killed by the royalists.

== See also ==
- Mexican War of Independence
