= Francisco Javier Negrete =

Spanish army officer (1763–1827)

Francisco Xavier de Negrete
- Born: 9 March 1763; Madrid, Spain
- Died: 3 January 1827 (aged 63); Paris, France
- Military career
- Rank: Captain general
- Conflicts: American Revolutionary War; Great Siege of Gibraltar; War of the Pyrenees; Ferrol Expedition; War of the Oranges; Peninsular War

Francisco Xavier de Negrete y Adorno, 1st Duke of Cotadilla (1763–1827), was a Captain General of New Castile and, briefly, Viceroy of Navarre.

After having seen much active duty in the last two decades of the 18th century and at the beginning of the 19th, no records exist of Negrete having taken part in any actual combat during the Peninsular War. He was, nevertheless, due to his high rank, a major political and military figure during that period in Spain, playing a role for which he was heavily criticised, and was one of the many leading military and political figures, such as the Duke of Frías, the Count of Montarco, O'Farrill, Azanza, Cabarrús, Mazarredo, Urquijo, and Negrete's father, 2nd Count of Campo de Alange, who were declared traitors and outlawed by the Supreme Central Junta in May 1809, exactly a year after the Second of May Uprising.

== Early career ==
As aide-de-camp to Juan Vicente de Güemes, Count of Revilla-Gigedo, Negrete saw active service at the Great Siege of Gibraltar in 1782. Promoted to colonel of the Valencia Regiment in 1784, during the War of the Pyrenees he participate actively in the invasion of Roussillon, leading General Ricardos' vanguard into Saint-Laurent-de-Cerdans, the first Spanish unit to enter French soil.

In 1800, as interim captain-general of Galicia, Negrete oversaw the defeat of the Ferrol Expedition, the unsuccessful British attempt to capture Ferrol.

In 1802, Negrete led the Army of Extremadura's 4th Division during the War of the Oranges. The following year he was promoted to lieutenant general and appointed Inspector General of Infantry.

In July 1807, Negrete was appointed Captain General of New Castile.

== Peninsular War ==
Following the Tumult, or Mutiny of Aranjuez, Negrete was responsible for arresting, on Godoy's orders, Crown-Prince Ferdinand VII's co-conspirators in the so-called El Escorial Conspiracy, who had themselves been betrayed by Ferdinand, and under whose very orders they were acting in requesting Napoleon's assistance in Ferdinand's struggles against his own father and against Godoy, thereby earning their political animosity, although they, like the future King, were all acquitted.

Following the Second of May Uprising, (Note: Doubts existed at the time regarding the "spontaneity" of the uprising, with both King Carloz IV and Napoleon believing that Ferdinand VII had been involved, as he had indeed been in the Aeranjuez affair (op. cit. Rodríguez).) during which Negrete gave the order, in full accordance with the Junta and the minister of War, O'Farrill's instructions, for Spain's troops to be confined to barracks, an order which, according to Juan Pérez de Guzmán y Gallo, Secretary of the Real Academia de la Historia from 1913 to 1921, and author of what is considered the most important study of the events around that uprising, stated "cannot but be considered prudent, despite all the criticism", given the overwhelming superiority of the French forces. (Note: The Spanish garrison of Madrid at that time numbered 3,000 troops while the French force had 30,000 men, all strategically located around the city's barracks (op. cit. Rodríguez).)

In May 1811, Negrete led the escort of a convoy from Bayonne to Madrid, which included General Hugo's wife, Sophie Trébuchet, and their three children, one of whom was the nine-year-old Victor Hugo.

=== Exile ===
Following the Allied Anglo-Portuguese victory at the Battle of Salamanca, at Arapiles (July 1812), over twenty thousand afrancesados, including Negrete and his family, left Madrid for Valencia. Although he returned in December, his family went to Paris, where Negrete's father was, having been Spain's ambassador there until 1811.

When Joseph's reign finally collapsed, Negrete left Madrid in May 1813 for exile in France. Although the 1813 peace treaty between Napoleon and Ferdinand VII pardoned those "Spaniards who had supported King Joseph", a new decree in 1814 established the opposite. Although, with the amnesty declared by the liberals of the Trienio Liberal, Negrete made plans in 1823 to return to Madrid, the restoration of Ferdinand's absolutism in the Ominous Decade, he was unable to. He died in exile in Paris in 1827.
