= Patones =

- Rural, educational and hill-sport station
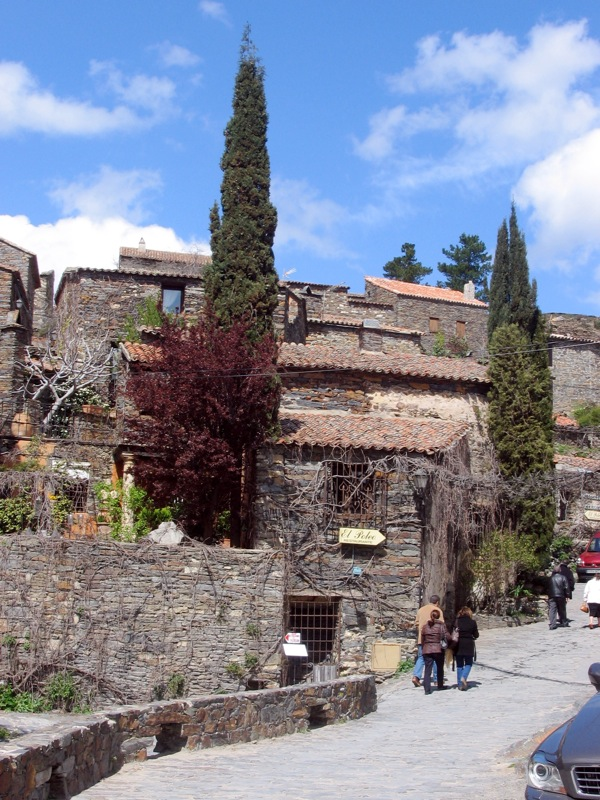
- General view of the ancient village (Patones Arriba) with its characteristic slate pavements and buildings

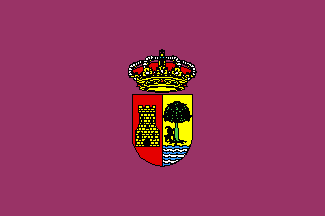
- Flag Coat of arms

- Location of the municipality of Patones within the Community of Madrid

- Location of Madrid within Spain
- Coordinates: 40°51′17″N 3°29′07″W
- Country: Spain
- Region: (Community of Madrid) Madrid

Government
  - Type: Mayor–council
  - Body: Ayuntamiento de Patones
  - Mayor: Eladio Hernanz Gil (PP)

Area
  - Total: 34.5 km^{2} (13.3 sq mi)
- Elevation: 718 m (2,356 ft)

Population (2025-01-01)
  - Total: 617
  - Rank: 1st
- Time zone: UTC+1 (CET)
  - Summer (DST): UTC+2 (CEST)
- Postal codes in Spain: 28107
- Area code: 34 (Spain) + 91 (Madrid)
- Patron Saint: Virgen de Patones
- Consists of two settlements: Arriba (upper) Patones – the ancient hillside village known as the Reino de Patones (Kingdom) abandoned in the mid 20th century for Abajo (lower) Patones, a larger modern town on the plain below.

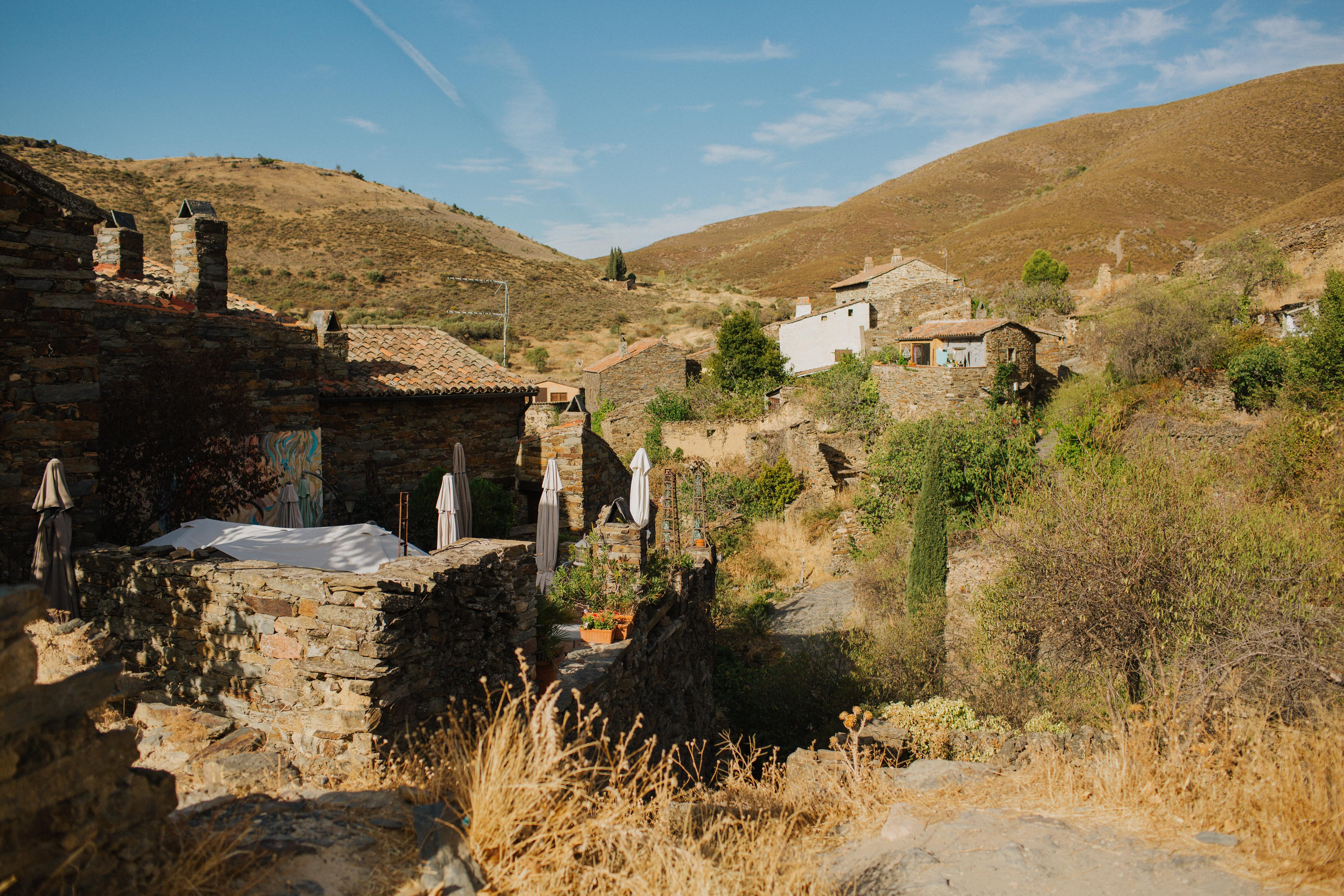
View of Patones

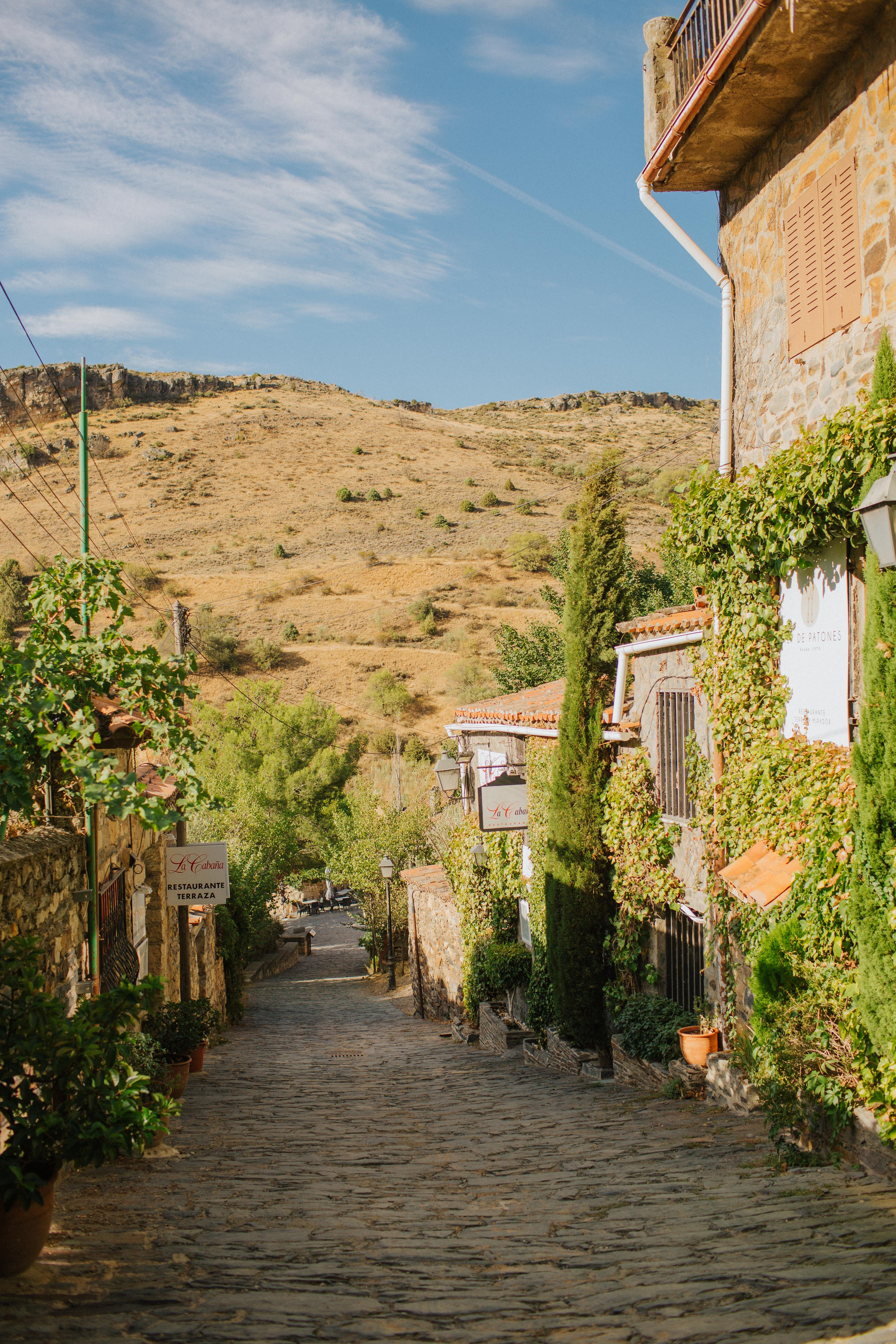
One of the streets in Patones

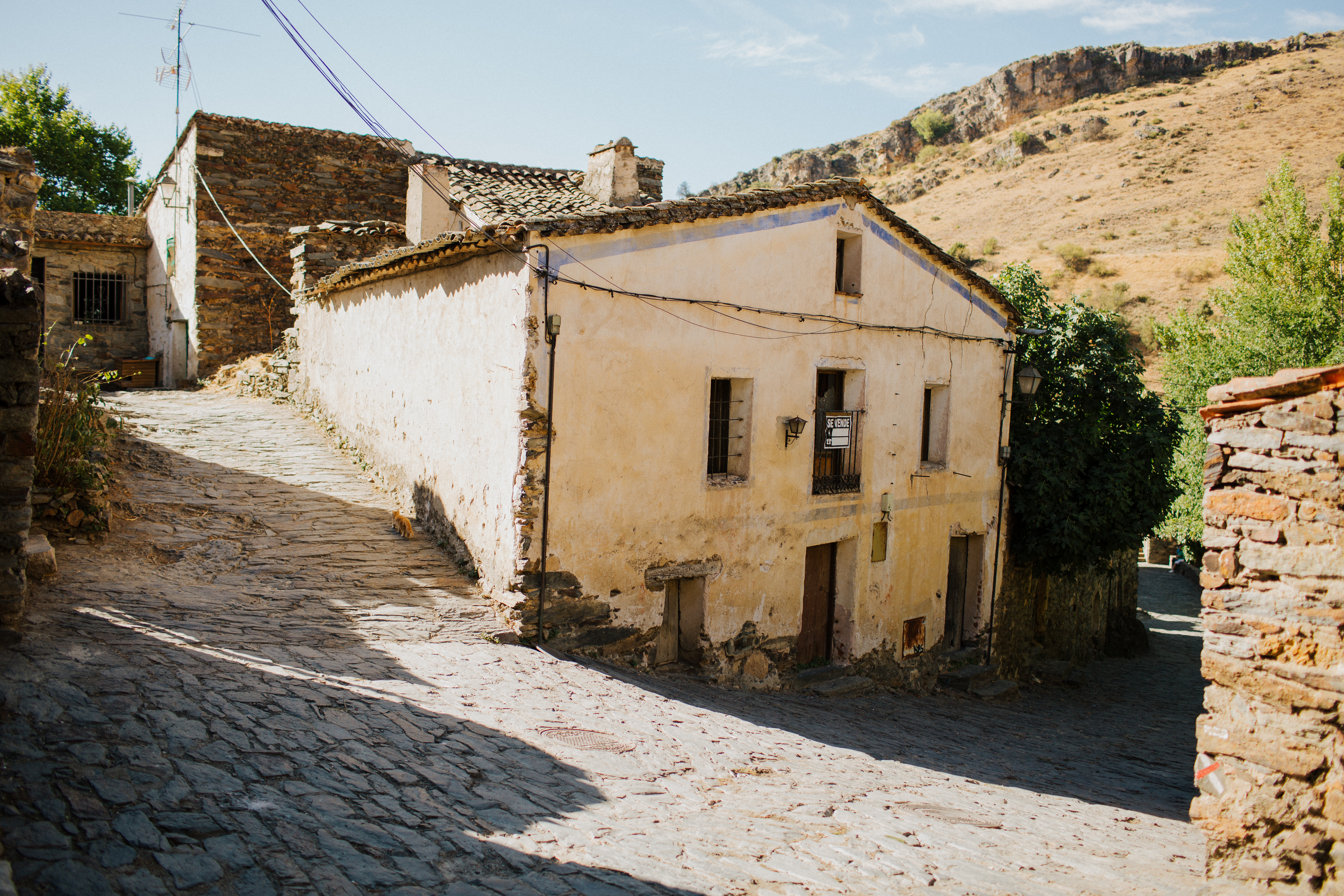
Old buildings in Patones

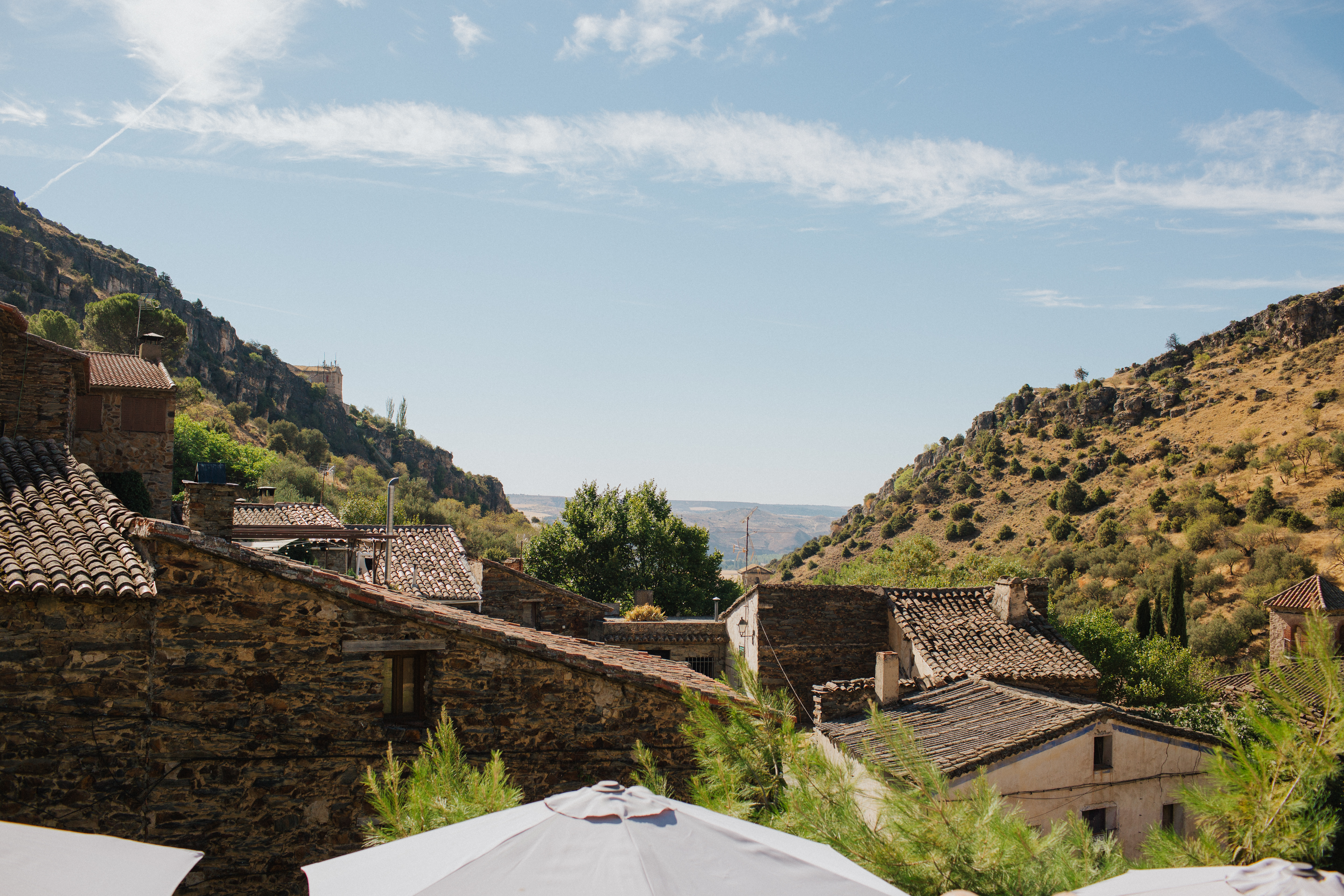
View of Old buildings in Patones

Patones is a Spanish municipality in the region of the Comunidad de Madrid situated partly in the valley of the river Jarama and partly in the foothills of the Sierra de Guadarrama mountain range.

Although small, the town has its own council, and consists of two distinct settlements: The ancient hillside village (Upper) Patones Arriba and the modern (Lower) Patones Abajo on the plain below.

- Altitude: 834 m
- Extension: 35 km²
- Distance from Madrid: 60 km
- Population (in 1999) 368

According to an 18th-century travelogue quoted below, the name is believed to originate from the family name of the first settlers Patón, who were, reputedly refugees from Muslim invaders who established a private Christian Kingdom of Patones Alternatively, since Iberian languages are of Latin origin the name may simply be derived from patricius.

== Patones Abajo ==
The area around Patones is a major water catchment zone with extensive storage reservoirs and pumping stations operated by the company Canal de Isabel II which is the principal water utility for both the city and the region of Madrid.

As mechanized transport grew in importance around the mid 20th century, a more accessible settlement was established on the plain below the original village, hence the name Patones Abajo (Lower Patones)

Although the schools and administration buildings in the old village were then of fairly recent construction, new facilities were created in the new settlement. (Upper) Patones Arriba was finally abandoned in the mid-1960s.

In the 1990s the historical value of the old village and the potential for hill-sports was appreciated, and the old settlement was extensively rehabilitated. Facilities for rural education, cultural tourism, and sports-recreation were established. At the same time, day facilities for visitors and short-stay accommodation was also amplified and improved to meet modern technical standards.

A Rural Telecentre CENIT was established in 2002 to enhance to local economic development, and offer modern services in new technologies to the local population and business community.

The single-track road No. M912 to the Patones Arriba is heavily used by sports-cyclists, and motor-vehicle access has been severely restricted both for road-safety and environmental protection reasons. In 2011 a free micro-bus service between Patones Abajo and Patones Arriba was initiated as an experiment, principally to facilitate access for tourists and hotel guests.

== Patones Arriba ==
Patones Arriba existed some time before 1527, when its inhabitants were required to repair a bridge .

It is next mentioned in a census of 1555 when seven residents are recorded. In 1687 it became attached to the nearby town of Uceda, and the first record of the King of Patones dates from about this time.

In the 17th century it appears to have been the property of The Marquise of Ensenada, and at one time was owned by the Bishop of Toledo.

=== The King of Patones ===
The Kings of Patones were hereditary sages, and fulfilled the functions of mayor and justice of the peace. They governed the town until 1750 when the last incumbent moved to Madrid. There is an account of this role written in 1781 by Don Antonio Ponz, in his monumental work Journey around Spain, in which there is significant entry in Vol. X. The work was published in Madrid, about 1781 The (Spanish language) entry concerning the Kingdom of Patones is (approximately interpreted) as follows:

"About halfway between the towns of Uceda and Torrelaguna and to the left of the road is a large pass in the mountains, which seals a small valley, called " The Place of The Patones " It is the scene of a legend which is as follows: In the unfortunate age in which the Saracens became masters of Spain, we know that many of our inhabitants fled to the mountains and the most hidden nooks and crannies therein. Some good Christian Goths fled to this area, in search of refuge from their fierce and ruthless enemies in this rough and rugged country. Here they found asylum from the worst savagery of Muslim power, maintaining their customs, beliefs and sustaining themselves by hunting, fishing, beekeeping, herding of goats and growing of some rye crop, as they do now.

These men, who were called Patones chose a wise person from a family of integrity to govern and decide their disputes, so were keeping from century to century an hereditary government, calling their chief the "King of the Patones". Is this not the most curious thing that, Spain having regained its former freedom, and fully shaken off the yoke of the Saracens, that here should have been preserved among the Patones this kind of government (rather than subordinating themselves to the Spanish Court) surviving into modern times when the last king of Patones was known to have gone to Torrelaguna to sell bundles wood, and where he was known to several individuals to whom I have spoken.

This man, who was peaceful and adverse to gossip, kept accounts and managed the estates of his subjects according to tradition – a flood of legal formulas of his kingdom where trials were entirely verbal, lacking written declarations, formal transactions or recorded judgments. Finally, when the occupation of government became so onerous as to impede his own subsistence, so he abdicated his throne, leaving Patones without a shepherd, until were placed under the jurisdiction of district of Uceda, in which municipality the Kingdom of the Patones is now administered.

The subjects of this tiny kingdom thus lost many significant and ancient privileges, which is no small consideration when the Royal Council of Spain issues decrees and orders to the captain-generals, governors and justices, and wrote separately that ancient village, addressing its governor as: "The King of Patones." It should no laughing matter that this may well be tested in Madrid in some respects and even, I have understood that His Majesty, Don Fernando VI, who wanted to inquire about some unusual circumstances of the kingdom of Patones ... How many moral and political reflections spring to mind! A hereditary kingdom of a thousand years at least, ruled in profound peace, with no other rules save that of natural reason, a kingdom preserved in the middle of Spain, which was unable to accept the Koran, nor such errors more lately visited upon us, a kingdom happy within its own narrow limits, without other influence, obligation or need other than to cultivate their lands, the children obedient to their parents, and all subject to the ordinances of their king ..

Therefore be advised, dear readers of this unique purposeful and enduring Platonic monarchy, and wonder how is it possible that there it was, but twelve leagues distant from Madrid, unknown, or at least its spirit unremarked? I wonder no more, for now I have spoken thereof. We know that our curiosity leads us to investigate what happens to two or three thousand leagues distant, ignoring that which seems familiar, merely because is in our own house .. "

== Places of interest ==
Patones Arriba is almost exclusively constructed in black slate and provides an important source of information for students of medieval and drystone architecture.

=== General environment ===
The lower part of the municipality is agricultural, with cereals, vineyards and olive groves which stretch up-hill. The banks of the river Jarama a very attractive arboreal landscape that follows the road to Torrelaguna.

Higher up, rockroses appear, and the northern and eastern facing slopes are commercial pine forest. Above Patones Arriba, in different areas known as eras there are crop terraces once used for growing rye, pens for holding livestock (which were mostly goats) and sties for pigs. All of the eras are now abandoned and disused except as marked paths for hill-walkers. Hunting wild animals is strictly licensed.

=== Ponton De la Oliva ===
The Ponton de la Oliva is a reservoir now in disuse. It is the last of six reserves along the course of the river Lozoya and is also its oldest, having been built in 1857 as part of a system of dams and canals supplying drinking water to the capital.

=== Canal de Cabarrús ===
This irrigation channel was constructed between the 16th and 18th centuries. It has a length of 13 kilometers (eight miles), and was the first to be built to irrigate the valley of Uceda from the river Lozoya (and later the Ponton de la Oliva).

Its course runs through the towns of Patones, Torremocha and Torrelaguna. Originally there were six bridges, three aqueducts, eight guardhouses and numerous smaller canals.

It remained in use until the late 19th century, when it was superseded by the more systematic work of the Canal de Isabel II. A 1.3 km section remains in operation in Patones which is fed from the Canal de la Parra and Atazar Reservoir. The canal is a Grade 1 (maximum) listed site, with two ancient stone bridges classified at Grade 2 protection. It is also called a canal in Spanish.

=== The Ermita de la Virgen de la Oliva ===
The Hermitage, now a ruin under a preservation order, was built for a religious community in about the 12th or 13th century and was attached to the Cathedral Church of Alcala de Henares and now belongs to the successor Diocese of Complutense, based in the same town.

=== Cueva del Reguerillo ===
The cave of Reguerillo is the most important archaeological site in the Comunidad Madrid, in terms of both scientific interest and for recreational caving.

Unfortunately, although it has been declared a monument of national interest since 1944, easy access to the cave and its close proximity to the city of Madrid made the cave a recreation center for many groups who were lacking the necessary knowledge and respect for such a site, and the cave became contaminated with trash and graffiti. Accordingly, since 2008 it has been closed to the public by the Directorate General for Heritage in the Community of Madrid, in order to allow the scientific community to perform archaeological and paleontological studies.

It contains three levels of varying difficulty between 78m and 9810m depth. Detailed information can be obtained from the Spanish Wikipedia article.

In 1974 a 2nd-century Celtic Druid encampment was also found nearby.

== Public transport ==
Patones has three bus lines. One of them has its head at the Plaza de Castilla Interchange. The other two lines communicate Patones with other municipalities in the area

Line 197: Madrid (Plaza de Castilla) -Torrelaguna / Uceda 2 services to Madrid from Monday to Friday and 3 on weekends and holidays. 2 to Uceda from Monday to Friday, 4 weekends and holidays

Line 197A: Torrelaguna-Patones-Uceda 1 towards Uceda and 2 towards Torrelaguna

Line 913: Torrelaguna-El Atazar 3 on weekends and holidays and 9 daily.

== Festivities ==
- La Candelaria (2 February)
- Carnival (before Lent, usually in February)
- Saint Joseph's Day (19 March)
- Saint John's Day (24 June/midsummer)
