= François Cabarrus =

Spanish-French adventurer and financier (1752–1810)

The Count of Cabarrús
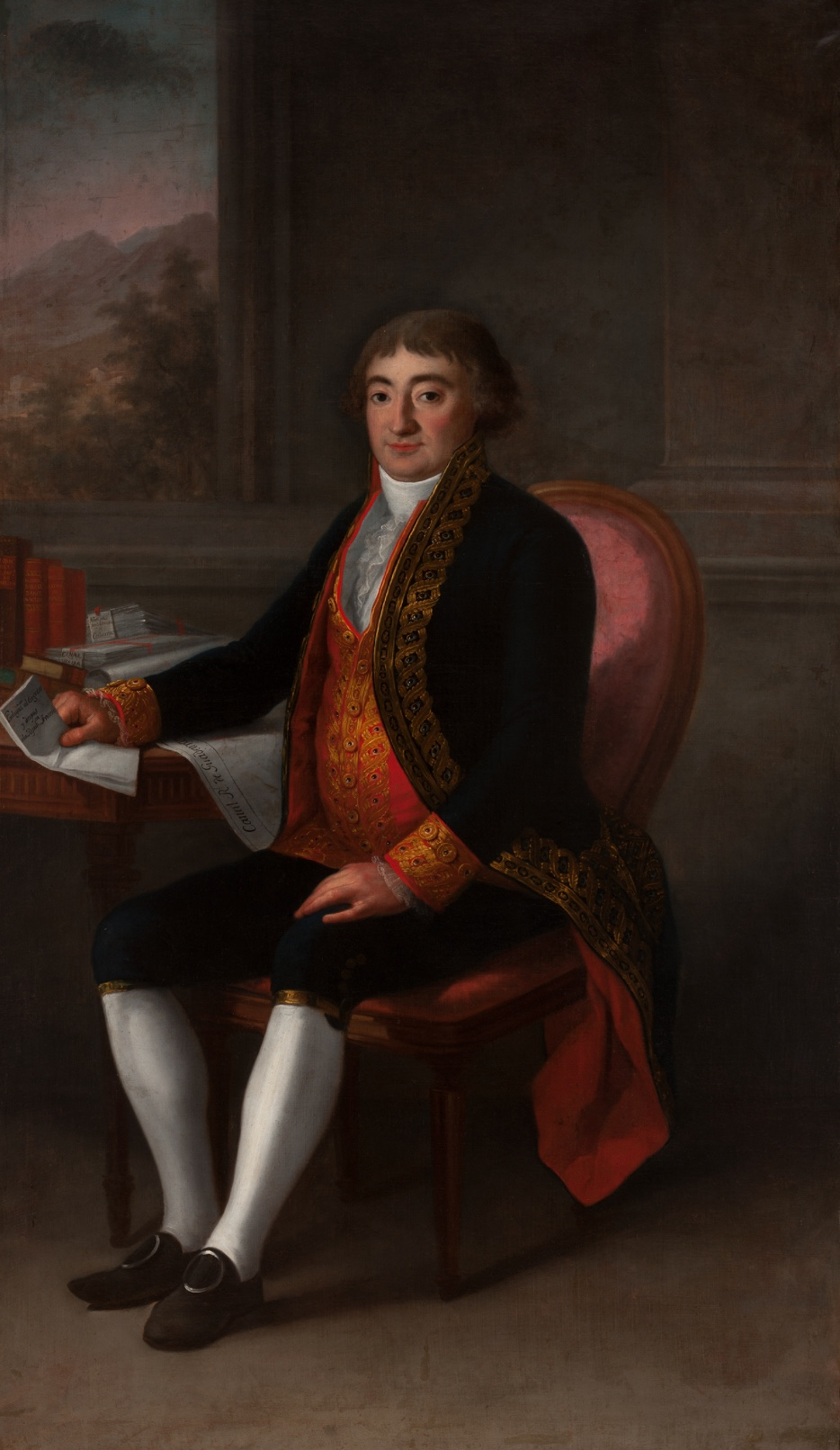
- Portrait by Agustín Esteve, 1808–1810

Minister of Finances
- In office 7 July 1808 – 27 April 1810
- Monarch: Joseph I
- Preceded by: Miguel José Azanza
- Succeeded by: José Martínez de Hervás

Personal details
- Born: François Cabarrus; 1752 Bayonne, Labourd, Kingdom of France
- Died: 1810 (aged 57–58) Seville, Kingdom of Spain
- Resting place: Seville Cathedral

Francisco Cabarrús, 1st Count of Cabarrús (1752–1810) was a Spanish-French adventurer and financier.

== Early life and education ==
He was born in Bayonne, France, where his father, Dominique Cabarrus Fourcade was a merchant and shipbuilder, linked to a saga of Basque sea-captains, whalers and adventurers, who settled in Capbreton (a town near Bayonne), coming from the Navarre region of Spain.

Francois was sent to study in Toulouse but was recalled to Bayonne by his family due to certain amorous adventures and was sent by his father to Spain to practice with one of his business correspondents, named Galabert. He not only learned the business, but also fell in love and married Maria Antonia Galabert Casanova, his employer's daughter. They settled in the town of Carabanchel Alto near Madrid, where Maria Antonia's grandfather had a soap factory. Their mansion in Carabanchel was named Maison St. Pierre (in French) and many years later this mansion and the lands surrounding it were incorporated into the Manor lands of the Count of Montijo (father of the Empress Eugenia de Montijo). However, he soon began to take an active interest in public matters of the court in nearby Madrid.

The Age of Enlightenment had reached Madrid, and King Charles III, was favourable to reforms advocated by a circle of politicians, including Gaspar Melchor de Jovellanos, Count Campomanes, Count Floridablanca, Pedro Pablo Abarca de Bolea (Count of Aranda). Among these Cabarrus became conspicuous, especially in finance.

== Career ==
=== Reforms ===
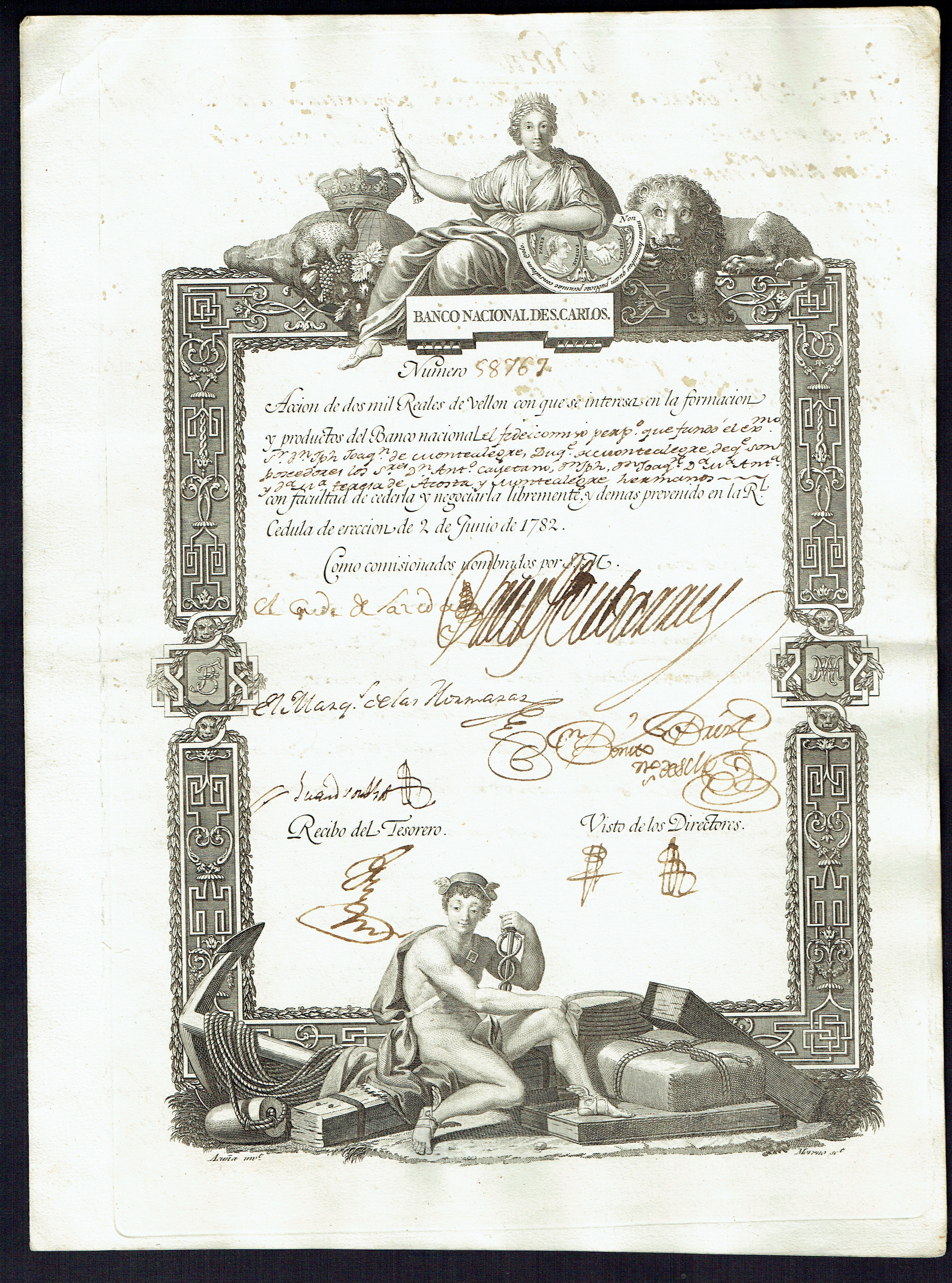
Share of the Banco Nacional de San Carlos, issued 2 June 1782, signed by François Cabarrus.

He founded a bank, the Banco de San Carlos – which is the precursor of today's Bank of Spain, a company to trade with the South American colonies and with Asia through the Philippine Islands – the Real Compañía de Filipinas, and an agricultural and hydraulic project known as the Canal de Cabarrus which is the origin of today's Canal de Isabel II, supplying the water to the city of Madrid, in the northeast of the Madrid Community – in the course of the Jarama and within the municipal boundaries of the towns of Torrelaguna, Patones, Torremocha del Jarama, Uceda and Caraquiz. He was also involved in at least two other projects involved in the opening of navigable waterways which were never completed. One was the Canal del Guadarrama which was supposed to open a navigable waterway from Madrid to the Ocean linking several river basins from the Guadarrama River up to the Guadalquivir River and from there to the sea (several ruins of these canals are still visible in the Guadarrama River basin area). The other project involved the widening of the Llobregat River in the province of Barcelona in Catalonia in order to open up the Llobregat River valley to shipping and thus give impulse to the future industrial region of Catalonia with all the textile and mining projects of the region. He counted on the Lemaur brothers for the technical part of the projects. He also probably took note of the Canal du Midi and the Canal del Languedoc, built about a century earlier in France which had given the French such good results by making available a navigable waterway from the Atlantic to the Mediterranean without having to navigate around Spain and avoiding the Strait of Gibraltar. The impulsor of the Canal del Lanquedoc was Pierre Paul Riquet, Count of Caraman and great-grandfather of Joseph Riquet, also Count of Caraman and later Prince of Chimay, and the last husband of Teresa Cabarrus Galabert. The family relationship between several members of the Cabarrus family and the Lesseps family (also originary from Bayonne), one of whose most notable members was Ferdinand de Lesseps, builder of the Suez Canal probably also influenced in this canal building impulse.

As one of the most influential members of the council of finance, he had planned many reforms in that department. When Charles III died (1788), and the reactionary administration of Charles IV put a stop to Enlightenment reforms, the men who had taken an active part in reform were suspected and prosecuted. Cabarrus himself was accused of embezzlement and thrown into prison in the Castle of Batres, a town near Madrid.

=== Under French domination ===
After two years he was released, created a count and employed in stately missions – he would even have been sent to Paris as Spanish ambassador, had not the French Directory objected to him as being of French birth.

Cabarrus took no part in the maneuvers through which Charles IV was obliged to abdicate and make way for Joseph Bonaparte (as King Jose I of Spain), brother of Napoleon Bonaparte, but his French birth and intimate knowledge of Spanish affairs recommended him to the emperor as the fittest person for the difficult post of minister of finance, which he held at his death. He died in Seville while on a trip accompanying Joseph Bonaparte and is buried in the Cathedral of Seville.

== Legacy ==
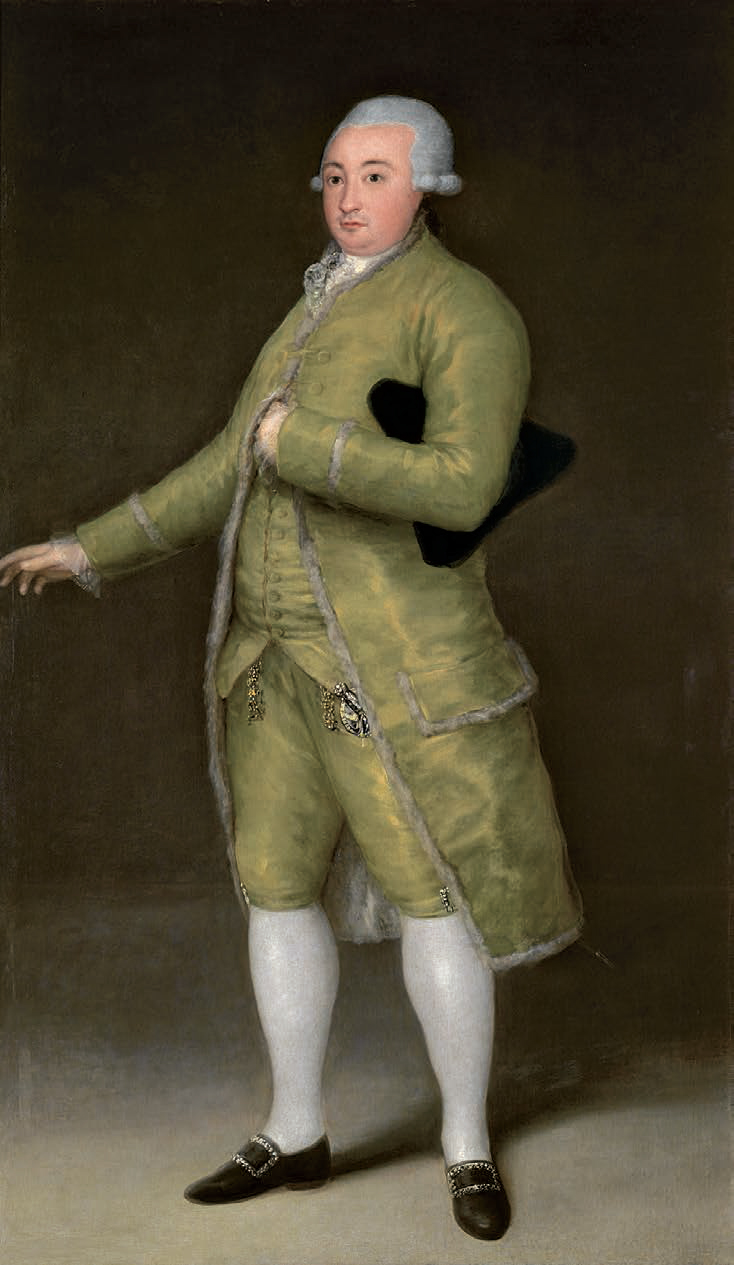
Portrait of Francisco Cabarrús by Francisco de Goya, 1788. Bank of Spain, Madrid

Due to the support he had given Joseph Bonaparte during his short reign in Spain, he was considered an afrancesado and, although he had already died, when Ferdinand VII recovered the throne, his family was persecuted and his fortune and holdings were confiscated. There is even a rumor that states that his remains were removed from his tomb in the Cathedral of Seville and thrown into the Guadalquivir. With all of the political turmoil of the following period, the heritage he left his heirs was restored and confiscated several times depending on who would be governing in Madrid.

His son, heir and second Conde de Cabarrus, Domingo Cabarrús Galabert, held several positions in government and was governor of the provinces of Palencia and Valladolid among other official posts. His daughter, Teresa Cabarrus Galabert, Thérèse Tallien, also Madamme Tallien (afterwards Countess of Caraman and Princess of Chimay), played a part in the later stages of the French Revolution, being named as Notre Dame de Buon Secours and Notre Dame de Thermidor by her contemporaries. One of his grandsons Domingo Cabarrus Quilty married Enriqueta Kirkpatrick y Grivegnée, sister of Manuela Kirkpatrick y Grivegnée, mother of Empress Eugenia de Montijo who married Emperor Napoleon III of France, and of the Duquesa de Alba. Domingo Cabarrus Quilty died before his father, Domingo Cabarrus Galabert and therefore did not become the third Count of Cabarrus, title that was inherited by his daughter, Paulina Cabarrus Kirkpatrick, as third Countess of Cabarrus.

Francisco Cabarrus Lalanne also acquired the title of Viscount of Rabouilhet from Pedro Pablo Abarca de Bolea, Count of Aranda, originally for his other son, Francisco Cabarrus Galabert, but the early death of this son made him join both titles and up to today the present Counts of Cabarrus carry also the title of Viscounts of Rabouilhet. The town of Rabouilhet and its neighboring towns and countryside (also included in the title deed) are in the Lanquedoc region of France.

His close friend, Francisco Goya, painted a full body portrait of him. This portrait is currently exhibited in the Bank of Spain building in Madrid.
