= Manuel Negrete de la Torre =

Secretary of State for Foreign Affairs
- In office 11 August 1808 – 15 June 1811
- Monarch: Joseph I Bonaparte
- Preceded by: Pedro Cevallos
- Succeeded by: Miguel José de Azanza

Secretary of State for War of Spain
- In office 27 April 1790 – 11 December 1795
- Monarch: Charles IV
- Preceded by: Jerónimo de Caballero
- Succeeded by: Miguel José de Azanza

Personal details
- Born: 15 January 1736 Reinosa, Spain
- Died: 13 March 1818 (aged 82) Paris, France

Manuel Negrete de la Torre (Reinosa, 15 January 1736 – Paris, 13 March 1818) was a Spanish aristocrat and Afrancesado politician who served as a minister in the government of King Joseph I Bonaparte.

== Biography ==
He was the son of Ambrosio José de Negrete y Ampuero, 1st Count of Campo de Alange († 1762), and Agustina Torre González de Castañeda. He was a knight of the Order of Santiago, regidor perpetuo of Madrid, and a gentleman of the royal household. He married María Agustina Adorno Sotomayor, with whom he had two sons: Manuel María and Francisco Javier, who became the 3rd and 4th Counts of Campo de Alange, respectively.

He held the title of 2nd Count of Campo de Alange from 1762, and became the 1st Marquess of Torre-Manzanal in 1779. Despite having no prior military service, he attained the ranks of colonel (1769) and mariscal de campo (1779) through royal appointments. He also served as Captain General of Guipúzcoa, and in 1783, he reached the rank of lieutenant general. From 27 April 1790, to 11 December 1795, he served as Secretary of War and Captain general of the Army. During his time as Secretary of War, he was confronted with the Nootka Crisis (1790), the Siege of Oran (1790–1792) and the War of the Pyrenees with France (1793-1795).

A supporter of Manuel Godoy, he served as an Ambassador of Spain to the Austrian Empire (1795-1803) and to Portugal (1803-1807).

In 1808, Napoleon conquered Spain and established his brother Joseph I Bonaparte as new King. Shortly after, in August 1808, Joseph I appointed Negrete as Minister of Foreign Affairs (1808-1811) and as an ambassador for Spain to the French Empire (1811-1814). For his services, he received the Order of the Golden Fleece in 1810. When Joseph Bonaparte was forced to flee to France in 1813, after defeat in the Peninsular War, Negrete accompanied him into exile.

He died in Paris on 13 March 1818, at the age of 82.
