= Church of la Magdalena (Torrelaguna) =

Cultural property in Torrelaguna, Spain

- Iglesia de la Magdalena (Spanish)
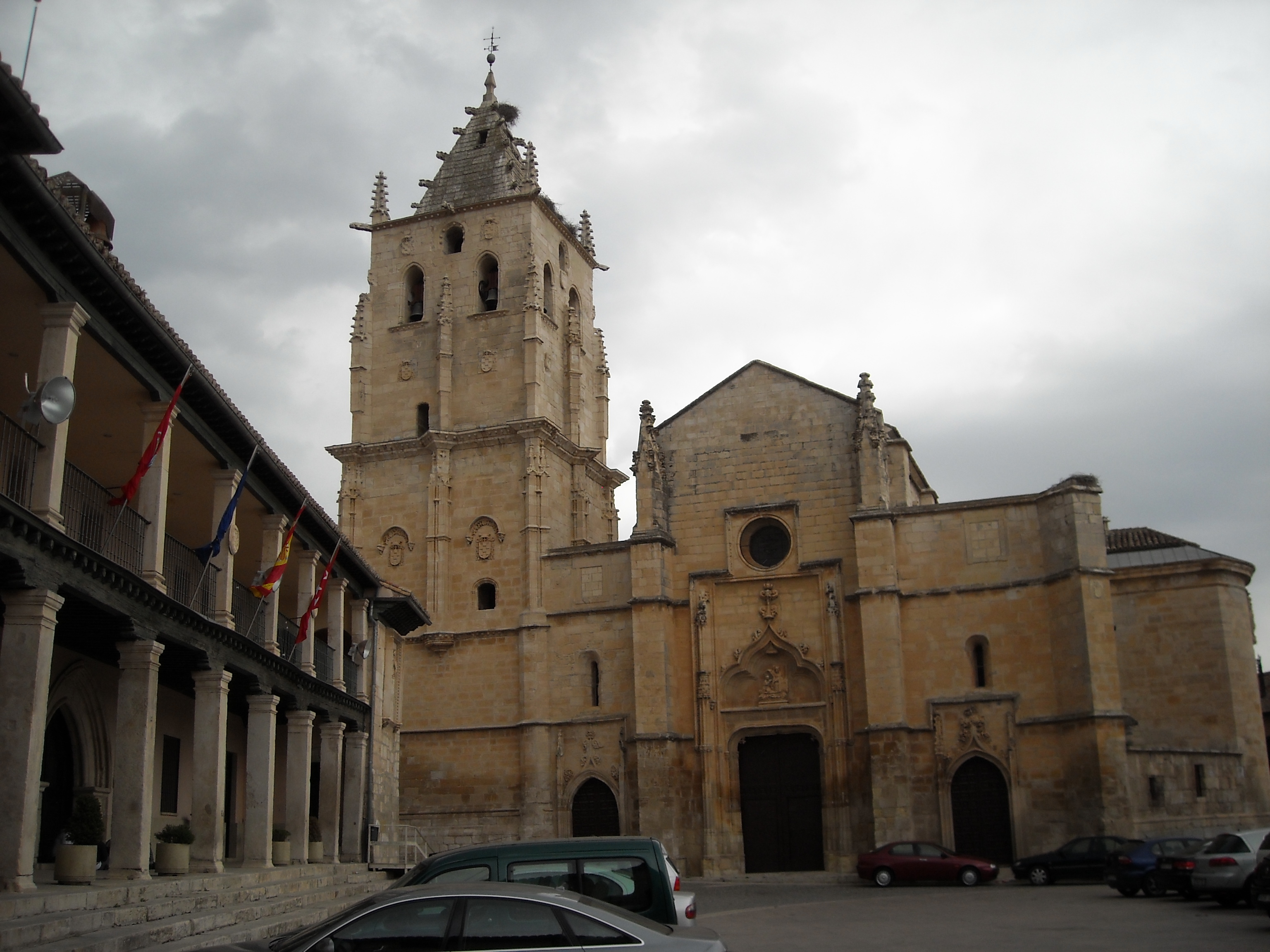

- Location within Spain
- 40.827848°N 3.538462°W
- Location: Torrelaguna, Spain

Site notes
- Architectural style: Gothic

Spanish Cultural Heritage
- Official name: Iglesia de la Magdalena
- Type: Non-movable
- Criteria: Monument
- Designated: 1983
- Reference no.: RI-51-0004866

The Church of la Magdalena (Spanish: Iglesia de la Magdalena) is a Gothic-style church located in Torrelaguna, central Spain. It was declared Bien de Interés Cultural in 1983.

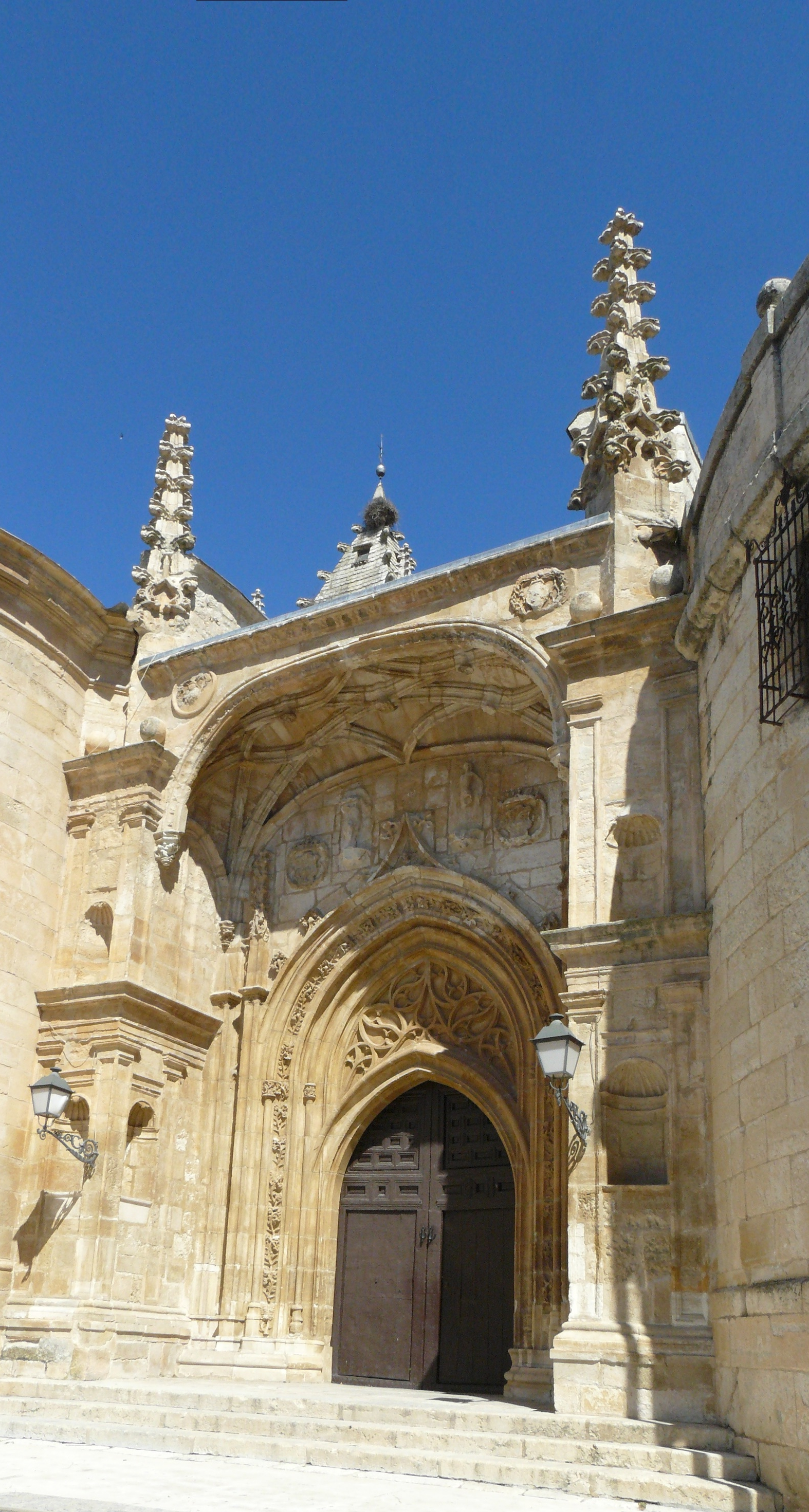
Southern portal.

The church construction dates from the 15th through to the 17th century. It has a nave and two aisles, with Gothic vaults supported by flying buttresses between which are the side chapels, each with movable retablos. The bell tower dates to the 15th century, and was commissioned by Cardinal Cisneros, whose coat of arms, together with those of the town, can be seen externally on the third floor. The so-called "Portal of the Resurrection" (16th century) is in mixed Mudéjar–Renaissance style. The high altar is by Narciso Tomé.
