= Miguel de la Grúa Talamanca, 1st Marquess of Branciforte =

The Most Excellent Miguel de la Grúa Talamanca 1st Marquess of Branciforte GE
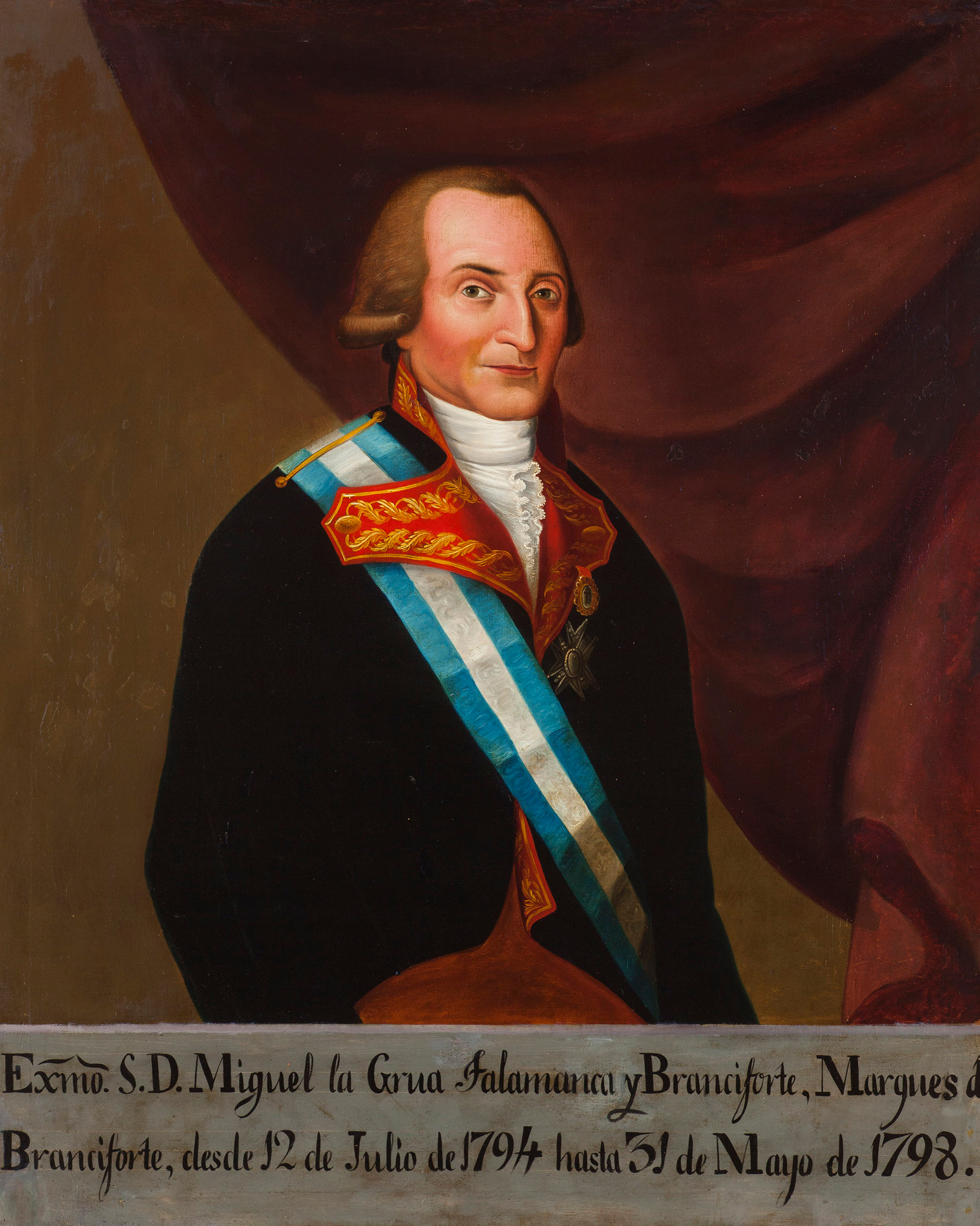

53rd Viceroy of New Spain
- In office 12 July 1794 – 31 May 1798
- Monarch: Charles IV
- Preceded by: Juan Vicente de Güemes
- Succeeded by: Miguel José de Azanza

Personal details
- Born: Miguel de la Grúa Talamanca y Branciforte; 1755 Sicily, Kingdom of Sicily
- Died: 1 June 1812 (aged 56–57) Marseille, French Empire

Military service
- Allegiance: Spain
- Branch/service: Spanish Army
- Rank: Captain general

Miguel de la Grúa Talamanca de Carini y Branciforte, 1st Marquess of Branciforte (Italian: Michele La Grua Talamanca e Branciforte) (Palermo, Sicily, ca 1755 – Marseille, June 1, 1812), was born in Sicily, and became a military officer of the Spanish Empire. He served as 53rd Viceroy of New Spain from July 12, 1794, to May 31, 1798.

Branciforte is remembered as the most corrupt viceroy of New Spain, and his designation is considered the beginning of the decadence of the viceroyalty of New Spain. He was the only viceroy of non-Spanish origin.

== Family history ==
He was the son of Vincenzo Maria La Grua Talamanca (1718–1787), 5th Prince of Carini, Duke of Villanova, Duke of Grotte, Marquess of Ragalmici and Lord of Terrasini, Praetor of Palermo in 1771, 1772 and 1773, Governor of Monte di Pietà of Palermo in 1765, 1766 and 1767. His mother was Lucrezia Branciforte.

Because he was the second son, Miguel de la Grúa Talamanca undertook a military career at the Spanish court, as the King of Sicily was also King of Spain. He rose to become captain general of the Spanish army. He was a protégé of Spanish Prime Minister Manuel de Godoy, and married in Madrid, August 15, 1790, to Godoy's sister, María Antonia de Godoy y Álvarez de Faria, de los Ríos y Sánchez-Zarzosa (Badajoz – Genoa, July 25, 1836), 21st Noble Dame of the Royal Order of Queen María Luisa. Their daughter Carlota de la Grúa Talamanca y Godoy was made the 268th Noble Dame of the Royal Order of Queen María Luisa. At some point prior to his appointment as Viceroy, the crown rewarded Miguel de la Grúa Talamanca with the title Marqués de Branciforte, 1st of that line.

By June 1787, Grúa was Governor of the Canary Islands, residing in Santa Cruz, Tenerife.

The Palazzo Branciforte was the family's principal "town house" in Palermo, Sicily, and dates from the late 1500s. The structure has been preserved, restored and repurposed, and is today a public space housing a museum, library and other tenants.

== Career in New Spain ==
The Marqués de Branciforte was sent by Godoy to head the government of the Viceroyalty of New Spain, taking office on March 26, 1794. He arrived in Veracruz on June 15, 1794, and took possession of the government in Mexico City on July 12, 1794. After his arrival in New Spain he was made a member of the Order of the Golden Fleece. He also became Knight of the Order of Santiago and the Order of Charles III.

As the agent of a corrupt prime minister, Grúa was chiefly concerned with obtaining money for him, and for himself. Using the war between Spain and Revolutionary France as a pretext, he confiscated all of the property of the French residents of New Spain and Louisiana—not a small amount. He sold the property, keeping a portion for himself.

In fact, he kept a portion for himself of all that passed through his hands. He sold offices and military ranks. He is known in Mexico as corrupt and inept, and one of the worst governors in the history of New Spain. This was in high contrast to his predecessor, Juan Vicente de Güemes, 2nd Count of Revillagigedo, considered one of the best. Grúa was opposed to Güemes Padilla in other ways as well—he began his government by favoring the enemies of the previous government.

On December 12, 1794, Fray Servando Teresa de Mier gave a famous, disrespectful sermon at the church of Guadalupe. He was deported to Spain, where he began a series of adventures. On April 27, 1795, the first course in mineralogy in New Spain began, under Andrés Manuel del Río.

In July 1795 Godoy made peace with France, but the French residents in New Spain remained under suspicion by the government. The Crown also ordered increased vigilance in regard to United States citizens, not because of any known expansionist plots, but because they were viewed as revolutionaries, along with the French.

During this time the Inquisition became less concerned about heretics and Protestants, and more concerned to suppress the revolutionary political and other ideas of the French revolutionaries. On August 9, 1795, an auto-de-fe was held. One of the condemned was Esteban Morel, a French man of science, professor of medicine and collaborator in the Gaceta de México. He was formally accused of heresy, deism and materialism. The same tribunal of the Inquisition brought proceedings against Juan Lauset and other Frenchmen, accusing them of having expressed feelings against the Spanish.

The government of Grúa entered into negotiations with the young republic in the United States to establish the boundaries between the two countries. A Peruvian priest living in Mexico, Melchor de Talamantes (1765–1809) was named to head the commission on the New Spain side.

=== Corruption ===
When Spain, now at peace with France, declared war on Britain on October 5, 1797, Grúa confiscated the property of Britons living in the viceroyalty, for his own benefit.

To flatter King Charles IV and Godoy, the viceroy commissioned the Spanish architect and sculptor Manuel Tolsá (1757–1816) to construct a grand equestrian statue of the king. The first stone in the pedestal was laid July 18, 1796, and the statue was completed in 1803. This statue, now known as El Caballito, is still a landmark in Mexico City.

The Ayuntamiento of Mexico City (the city government), brought suit against the viceroy for corruption, specifically for wasting vast sums of public money on projects of little consequence. The viceroy prevailed, and the Ayuntamiento was ordered to pay costs.

War again being declared with France, Viceroy Grúa intended to raise new regiments from the provinces, expecting to make a fortune through the sale of positions. However his incompetence and dishonesty by now had been credibly reported to the Court. He was removed as viceroy in 1798, and Miguel José de Azanza was named in his place.

== Legacy ==
The Villa de Branciforte, one of only three Spanish civil settlements in what is now the U.S. state of California (the others are now the cities of Los Angeles and San Jose), was named for him in 1797. In 1905, the Branciforte area was annexed into the city of Santa Cruz, California. Branciforte County (soon renamed Santa Cruz County), was one of the state's original counties at the time of its 1850 statehood.
