= El Atazar =

Coordinates: 40°56′N 3°28′W

- Municipality
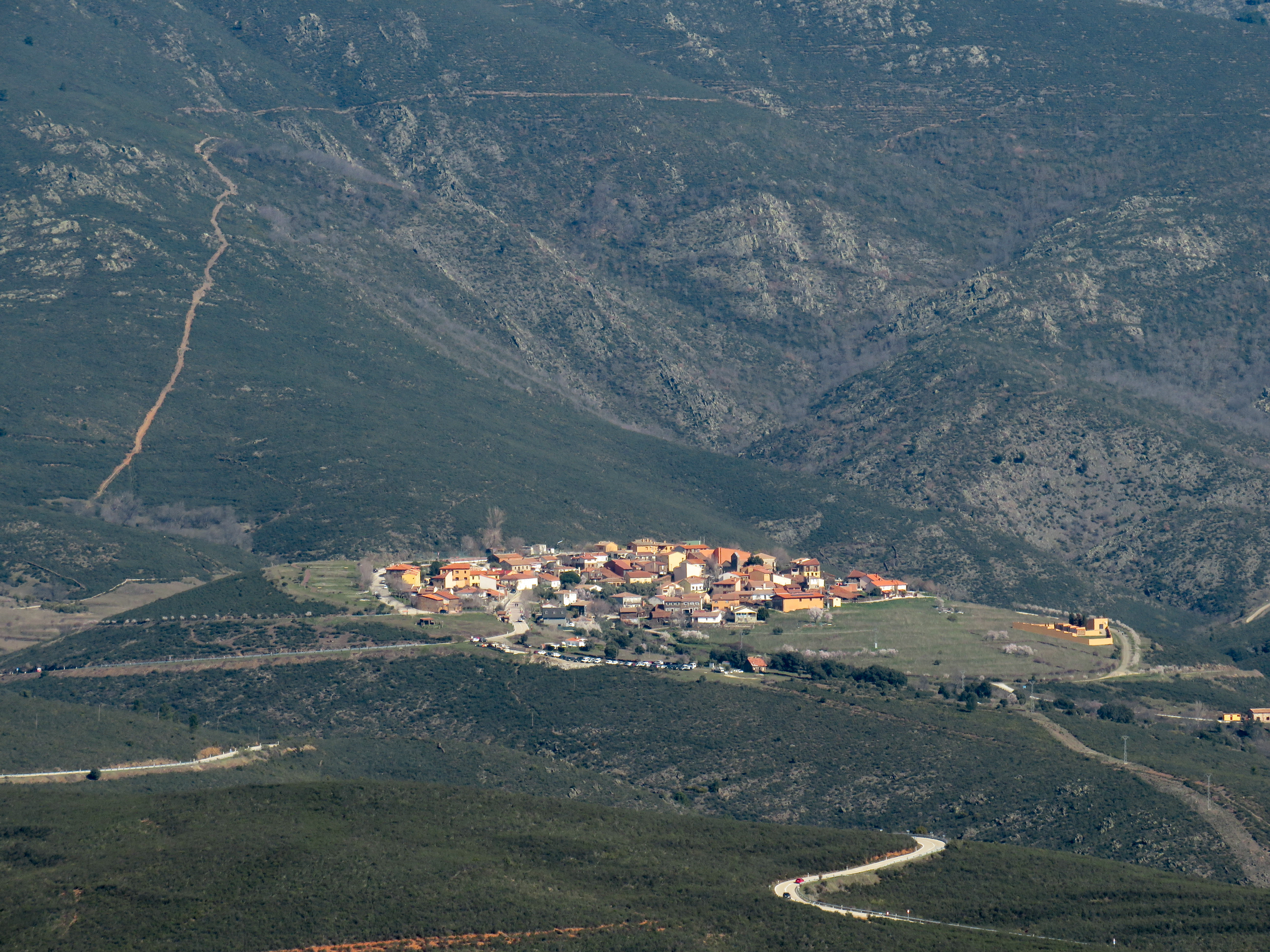
- El Atazar.

- Flag Coat of arms

- Municipal location within the Community of Madrid.
- Country: Spain
- Autonomous community: Community of Madrid

Area
  - Total: 11.41 sq mi (29.55 km^{2})

Population (2025-01-01)
  - Total: 110
- Time zone: UTC+1 (CET)
  - Summer (DST): UTC+2 (CEST)

El Atazar (Spanish pronunciation: [el ataˈθaɾ]) is a municipality of the autonomous community of Madrid in central Spain. It has a population of 102 inhabitants (INE, 2011).

== Gallery ==
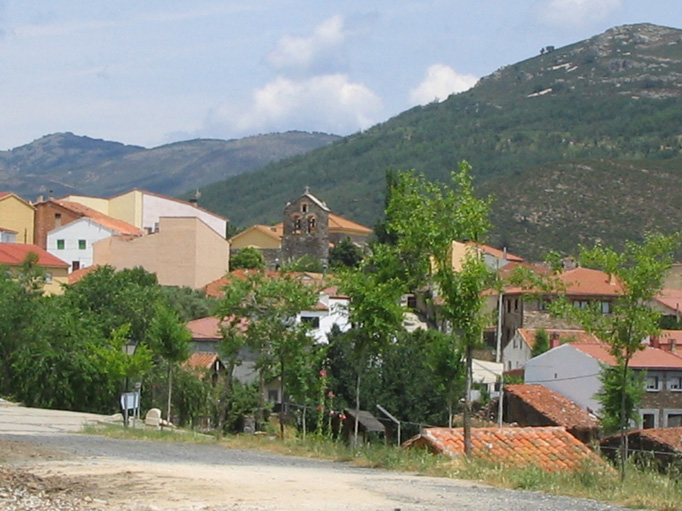

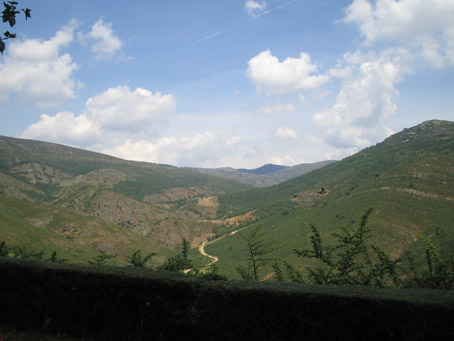

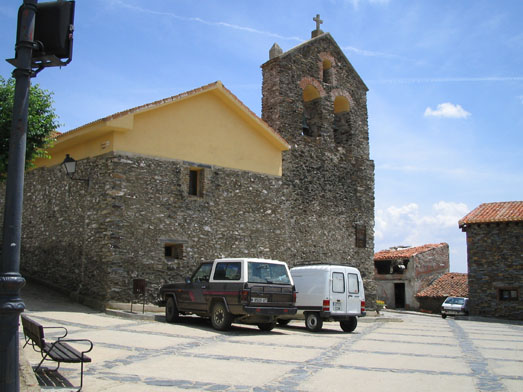
Santa Catalina Church

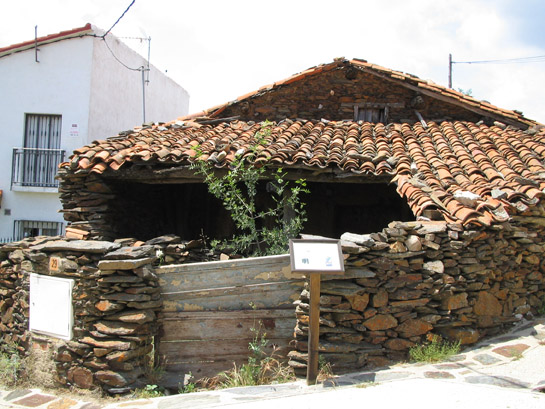
Traditional house

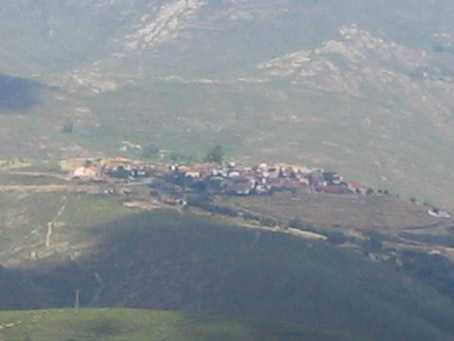

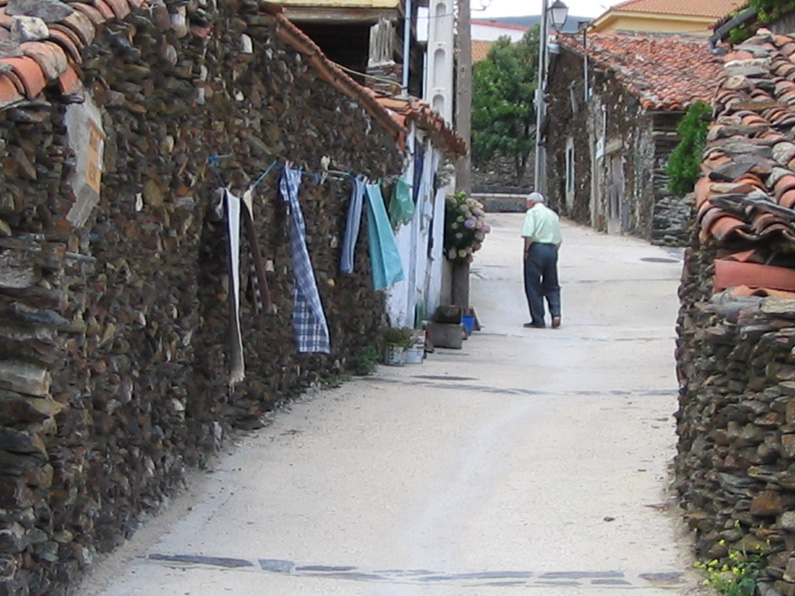
Traditional house

== Public transport system ==
El Atazar has only one bus line, and it doesn’t connect the village with Madrid. This line is:

Line 913: Torrelaguna-El Atazar
