= Conspiracy of the Machetes =

The Conspiracy of the Machetes (Spanish: La Conspiración de los Machetes) was an unsuccessful rebellion against the Spanish in New Spain in 1799. Although the conspiracy posed no threat to Spanish rule, nevertheless it was a shock to the rulers. Coming only 11 years before the Grito de Dolores, it is considered in modern Mexico to be a precursor of the Mexican War of Independence.

== Conspiracy ==
Pedro de la Portilla was a Criollo employee in the New Spain tax collectors' office in the Plazuela de Santa Catarina. He was poor, with no important connections. In 1799 he arranged a meeting with about twenty other powerless youths in a house at Alley of the Gachupines No. 7, Mexico City. Some of the men in attendance were guards in the plazas of the city. Others were low officials in the clock-making or silver industries. All of them were relatives or friends of Portilla.

The meeting discussed the situation that Criollos found themselves in, in relation to Peninsulares (Criollos were "Europeans" born in America, and Peninsulares were Europeans born in Spain. Gachupines became an insulting term for the latter.) Those present agreed to rise in arms to rid the country of Peninsulares.

The plan agreed on was to free prisoners, and with them storm the viceroy's palace, thus capturing high officials and funds. The conspirators then intended to proclaim the independence of Mexico, declare war on Spain, and kill or expel the Peninsulares. To accomplish this, they were counting on 1,000 pesos of silver, two pistols, and some 50 cutlasses and machetes to initiate a popular uprising under the patronage of the Virgin of Guadalupe. Because of this, the conspiracy became known as the Conspiracy of the Machetes.

After the successful outcome of the rebellion, the plan was to appeal to the people to decide what form of government should be established in Mexico. The conspirators apparently favored a Congress based on that recently established in the United States.

At the second meeting, Isidoro Francisco de Aguirre, a cousin of Portilla, became alarmed at the preparations, and went to the authorities to denounce the conspiracy (November 10, 1799). Viceroy Miguel José de Azanza gave orders that they be arrested, but without revealing the motives of their conspiracy in order to avoid excitement among the populace. All the conspirators were apprehended and spent many years in prison. The trial was long, and did not reach a verdict. Some of them died in prison. Portilla himself lived to see the independence of Mexico.
