= Miguel José de Azanza, 1st Duke of Santa Fe =

Spanish politician, diplomat and viceroy

The Most Excellent The Duke of Santa Fe KOS
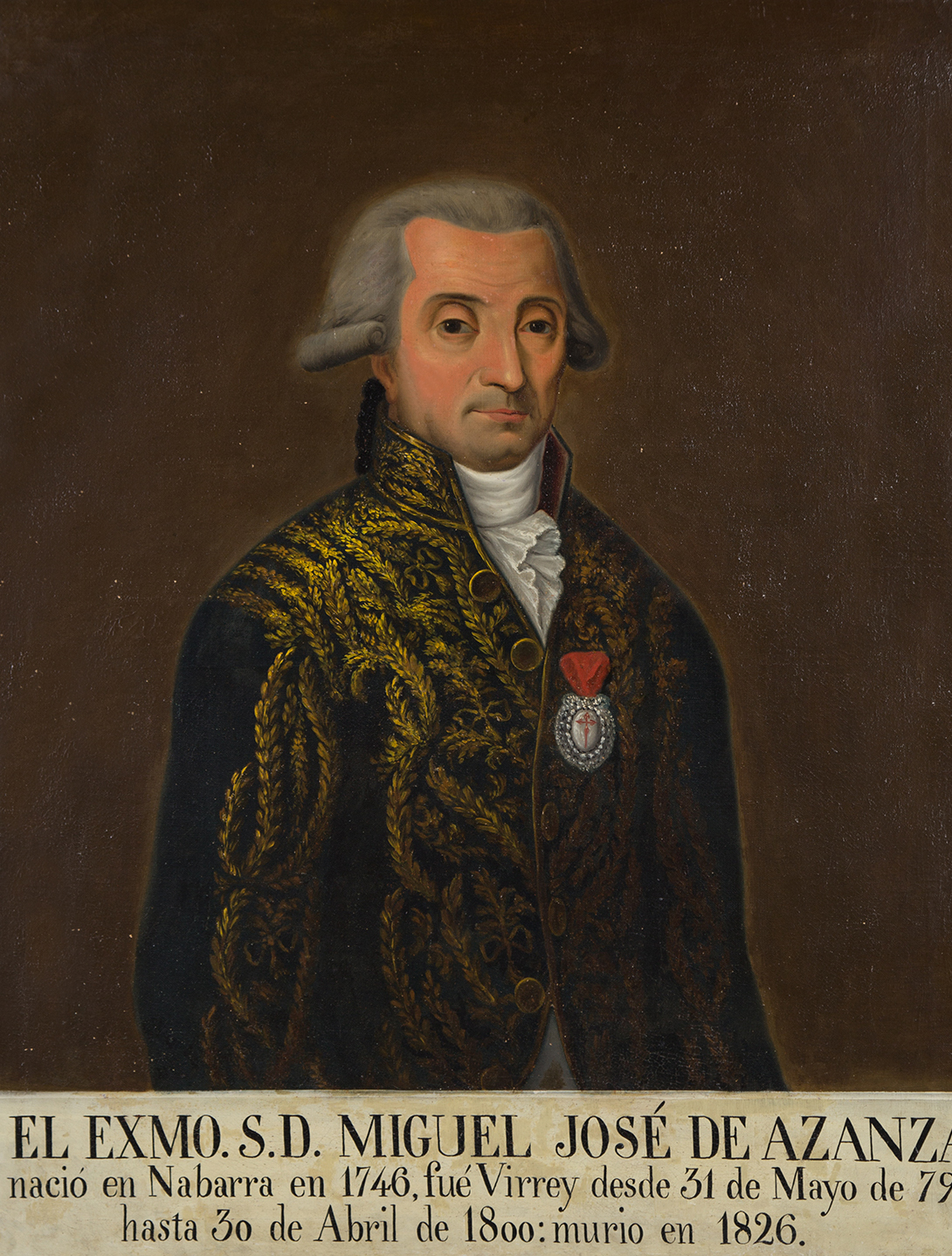

54th Viceroy of New Spain
- In office 31 May 1798 – 30 April 1800
- Monarch: Charles IV
- First Secretary of State: Francisco Saavedra de Sangronis; Mariano Luis de Urquijo; Pedro Cevallos Guerra
- Preceded by: Miguel de la Grúa Talamanca
- Succeeded by: Félix Berenguer de Marquina

Minister of Foreign Business of Spain
- In office 23 June 1811 – 27 June 1813
- Monarch: Joseph I
- First Secretary of State: Mariano Luis de Urquijo
- Preceded by: Manuel Negrete de la Torre
- Succeeded by: Position abolished

Minister of Ecclesiastical Affairs of Spain
- In office 25 January 1809 – 27 June 1813
- Monarch: Joseph I
- First Secretary of State: Mariano Luis de Urquijo
- Preceded by: Position created
- Succeeded by: Position abolished

Minister of Police of Spain
- Interim
- In office 27 July 1811 – 21 January 1812
- Monarch: Joseph I
- First Secretary of State: Mariano Luis de Urquijo
- Preceded by: Pablo Arribas
- Succeeded by: Pablo Arribas

Minister of the Indies of Spain
- In office 7 July 1808 – 27 July 1813
- Monarch: Joseph I
- First Secretary of State: Mariano Luis de Urquijo
- Preceded by: Position created
- Succeeded by: Tomás González Calderón (as Secretary of State for Overseas Governance)

Secretary of State for Treasury of Spain
- In office 28 March – 7 July 1808
- Monarch: Ferdinand VII
- First Secretary of State: Pedro Cevallos Guerra
- Preceded by: Miguel Cayetano Soler
- Succeeded by: François Cabarrus

Secretary of State for War of Spain
- In office 11 December 1795 – 7 October 1796
- Monarch: Charles IV
- First Secretary of State: Manuel Godoy
- Preceded by: Manuel Negrete de la Torre
- Succeeded by: Position abolished

Personal details
- Born: Miguel José de Azanza Alegría; 20 December 1746 Aoiz, Navarre, Spain
- Died: 20 June 1826 (aged 79) Bordeaux, France

Miguel José de Azanza y Alegría, 1st Duke of Santa Fe, KOS (20 December 1746, in Aoiz, Navarre, Spain – 20 June 1826 in Bordeaux, France) was a Spanish politician and diplomat, and viceroy of New Spain from 31 May 1798 to 30 April 1800.

== Origins and military career ==
Azanza was born in Navarre. He studied in Sigüenza and Pamplona. At 17, he arrived in the New World, in the company of his uncle José Martín de Alegría, administrator of the royal treasury in Veracruz. He became secretary to the royal visitador (inspector), José de Gálvez, and with him he traveled throughout New Spain, learning much about its problems. Apparently, Gálvez had him arrested in Sonora for divulging his (Gálvez's) whereabouts. Nevertheless, Gálvez entrusted Azanza with various important missions.

In 1771, he became a cadet in the Lombardy infantry regiment in Spain. In 1774, he was in Havana as secretary of the Marquess of la Torre, captain general of Cuba. Together with Torre, he took part in the siege of Gibraltar (1781).

== Diplomatic and political career ==
He left the military to pursue a diplomatic career. Between 1784 and 1786, he was secretary of the Spanish embassy in Saint Petersburg and chargé d'affaires in Berlin. In 1788, he was corregidor of Salamanca and intendant of the army in Valencia the following year.

In 1793, he was the Spanish minister of war under Prime Minister Manuel de Godoy. He served for three years during the war with France.

== As viceroy of New Spain ==
On October 19, 1796, Azanza was named viceroy of New Spain. Many people took this as a discreet form of exile. Godoy was thought to want to rid himself of Azanza because he was a strong critic. Azanza took possession of the office of viceroy in 1798, at Orizaba. The populace welcomed the change from Miguel de la Grúa Talamanca y Branciforte, marqués de Branciforte, who was viewed as an immoral thief.

Grúa had stationed a considerable force of troops at Jalapa, Veracruz. Their expenses greatly cost the treasury, and their absence from their homes had left their fields abandoned. Azanza withdrew most of the troops gradually, beginning 15 May 1799. He sent regiments of provincial militia back to their provinces. With the savings, he fortified the port of San Blas and supplied it with cannons.

Thanks to the outbreak of the Anglo-Spanish War, he took steps to protect the coast from a potential British invasion. He stationed troops at Buenavista, near Veracruz, and completed a squadron of 18 gunboats stationed in Veracruz. Fighting with the Lipan Apaches and other Indians in the interior also occurred.

Because of the difficulties of maritime commerce, the number of factories producing cotton cloth in New Spain increased during his term of office.

Viceroy Azanza ordered that children from the orphanages be sent to California to increase the population (17 May 1799). The following year, he also founded a settlement on Río Salado, in Nuevo León, named Candelaria de Azanza (Nuevo León).

On 8 March 1800, a strong lasting four minutes earthquake was felt in Mexico City. This was later known as the Temblor de San Juan de Dios. Some houses fell, but there were no reported injuries.

Azanza did little to improve the capital or the colony. At the expiration of their contracts, most of the German mining instructors returned to their native country. One who remained was Luis Lidner, who occupied the chairs of chemistry and metallurgy at the Royal College of Mines.

== Conspiracy of the Machetes ==
In 1799, a conspiracy was discovered. Pedro de la Portilla, a Criollo employee in the tax collectors' office, met with about twenty youths in the Alley of the Gachupines (Spurs) in Mexico City. The meeting discussed the situation Criollos found themselves about Peninsulares. (Criollos were Europeans born in the New World, and Peninsulares were Europeans born in Iberia. Gachupines became an insulting term for Peninsulares.) Those present agreed to raise arms to rid the country of the Gachupines. For this purpose, they assembled several old cutlasses. As this was almost their only armament, the conspiracy became known as the Conspiracy of the Machetes.

The conspirators intended to free prisoners, take the viceroy hostage, proclaim Mexico's independence, and declare war on Spain. To accomplish this, they were counting on 1,000 pesos of silver, two pistols, and some 50 cutlasses and machetes to initiate a popular uprising under the patronage of the Virgin of Guadalupe.

At the second meeting, Isidoro Francisco de Aguirre, a cousin of Portilla, became alarmed at the preparations and went to the authorities to denounce the conspiracy (10 November 1799). Azanza ordered that they be arrested, but without revealing the motives of their conspiracy to avoid excitement among the populace. All the conspirators were apprehended and spent many years in prison. The trial was long and did not reach a verdict. Some of them died in prison. Portilla himself lived to see the independence of Mexico.

Although this was not a serious threat to Spanish rule, it was a startling indication of the colony's state of affairs, which was influenced by the recent American and French Revolutions.

== Later career and exile ==
After turning over power to his successor, Félix Berenguer de Marquina, in 1800 at the Villa de Guadalupe, Azanza returned to Spain. In 1808, he was minister of the treasury for King Ferdinand VII and a member of the supreme junta that governed in the king's absence.

Shortly after that, he submitted to Napoleon at Bayonne. Joseph Bonaparte made him the Duke of Santa Fe. With the defeat of the French, he was forced into exile. In Spain, he was sentenced to death in absentia, and his property was confiscated. He died in poverty in France in 1826.
