= Torrelaguna =

- Municipality
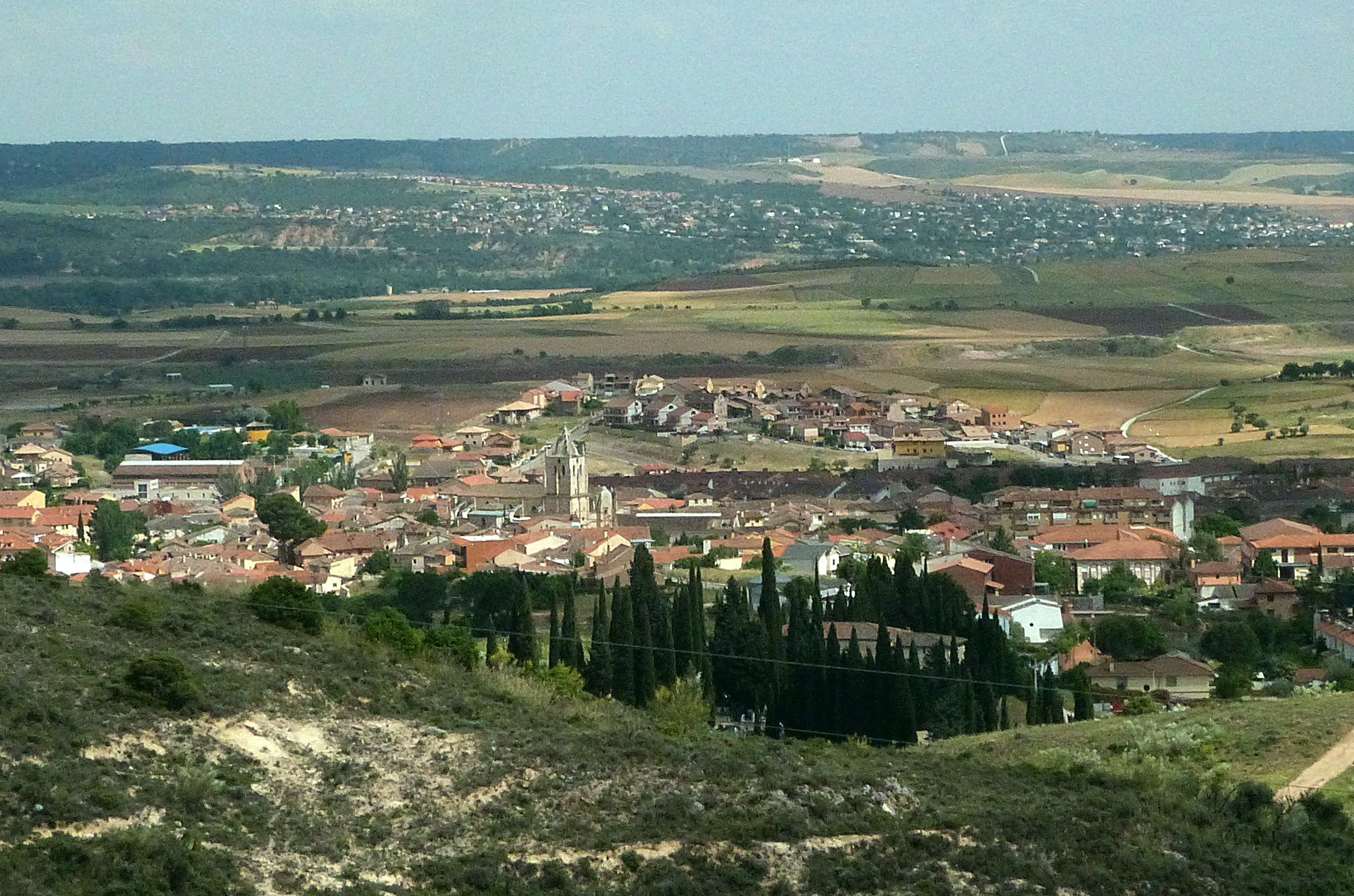

- Flag Coat of arms

- Location within Spain Location within Community of Madrid
- Coordinates: 40°49′34″N 3°32′20″W
- Country: Spain
- Region: Community of Madrid

Government
  - Mayor: Víctor Gutiérrez

Area
  - Total: 43.4 km^{2} (16.8 sq mi)
- Elevation: 744 m (2,441 ft)

Population (2025-01-01)
  - Total: 5,081
  - Density: 117/km^{2} (303/sq mi)
- Time zone: UTC+1 (CET)
  - Summer (DST): UTC+2 (CEST)
- Postal code: 28180

Torrelaguna (Spanish pronunciation: [torelaˈɣuna]) is a municipality in the Community of Madrid, Spain. It covers an area of 43.40 km^{2}. As of 2022, it has a population of 4,940.

== Public transport ==
Torrelaguna has three line buses. They are:

Line 197: Torrelaguna - Madrid (Plaza de Castilla)

Line 197D: Torrelaguna - El Vellón - El Molar

Line 913: Torrelaguna - El Atazar

== Main sights ==
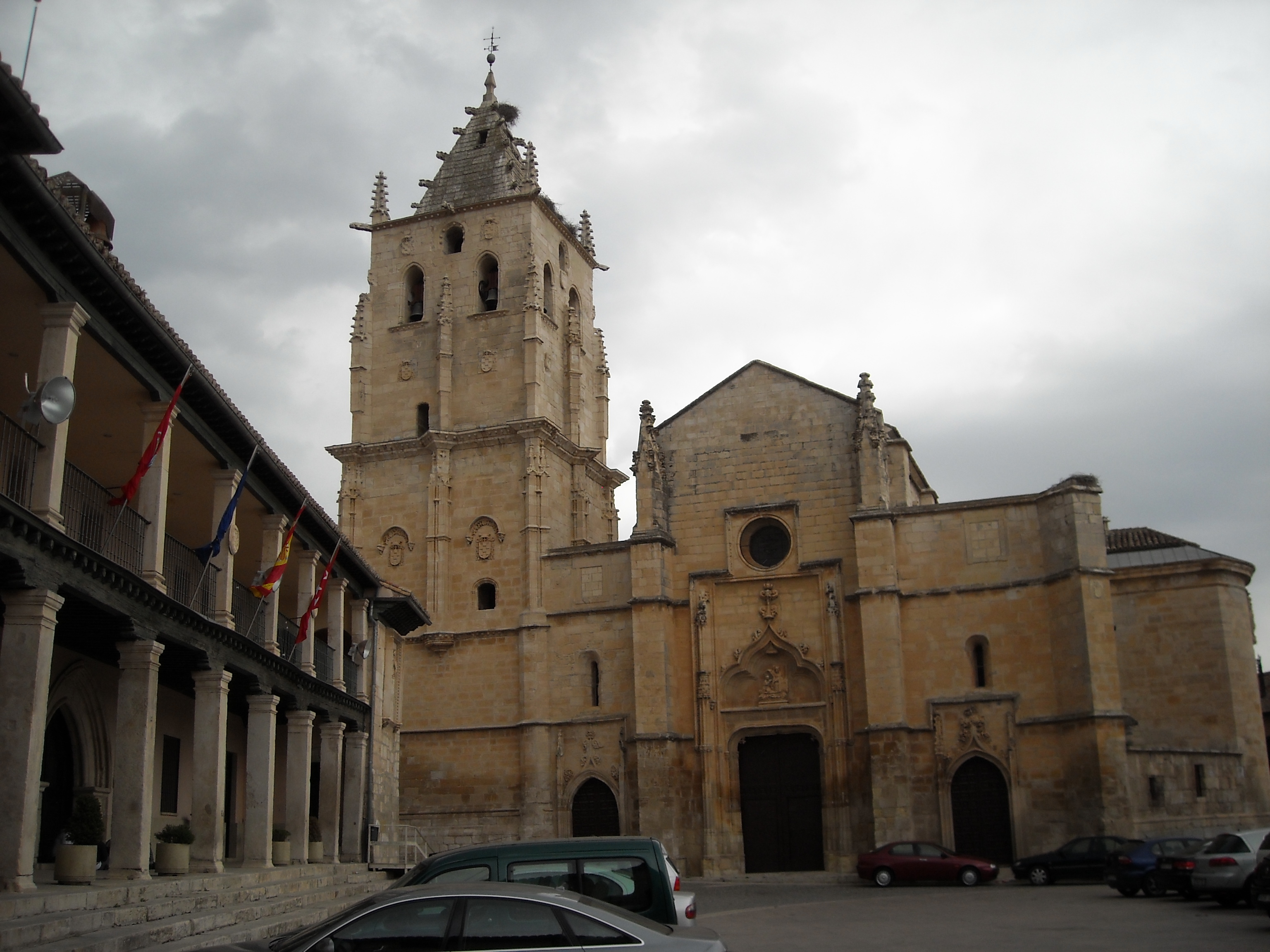
The church of Magdalene.

The parish church of La Magdalena (started in the 14th century, inaugurated in the 18th century) is one of the best examples of Gothic architecture in the community of Madrid.

Other sights include:

- Abbey of the Concepcionistas Descalzas. The chapel has a Plateresque façade from the 16th century, attributed to Juan Gil de Hontañón.
- Hermitage of Nuestra Señora de la Soledad (14th century).
- Ancient market place
- Palacio de Salinas, a Renaissance building.
- Town Hall (1515)
- Remains of the city walls.

== Politics ==
The eleven seats in the municipal government are distributed as below as of the 2023 elections. The municipality currently has a PP mayor, Víctor Gutiérrez, who formed a coalition with Ciudadanos to end 24 years of successive PSOE government.

Party	Votes	%	+/-	Seats	+/-
PP	885	37.48	20.1	5	2
PSOE	729	30.87	▼10.85	3	▼3
CUV	366	15.50	New	2	New
Ciudadanos	199	8.42	▼6.4	1	▼1
Vox	150	6.35	▼6.76	0	▼1
PSOE loss to no overall control					

== Notable people ==
- Saint Isidore the Farmer, a pious agricultural labourer of the twelfth century prayed to for rain. He and his wife Maria were canonised in 1622.
- Francisco Jiménez de Cisneros (1436–1517), cardinal, archbishop, statesman and abolitionist.
