= Pedro de la Portilla =

Mexican politician

Pedro de la Portilla was an 18th-century Criollo rebel in New Spain against the Spanish. He was the leader of the Conspiracy of the Machetes (Spanish: la conspiración de los machetes), an unsuccessful rebellion in 1799. Although the conspiracy posed no threat to Spanish rule, nevertheless it was a shock to the rulers. Coming only 11 years before the Grito de Dolores, it is considered in modern Mexico to be a forerunner of the Mexican War of Independence.

== See also ==
- Conspiracy of the Machetes
