= Church of San Esteban (Fresno del Torote) =

Church in Community of Madrid, Spain

- Iglesia de San Esteban (Spanish)
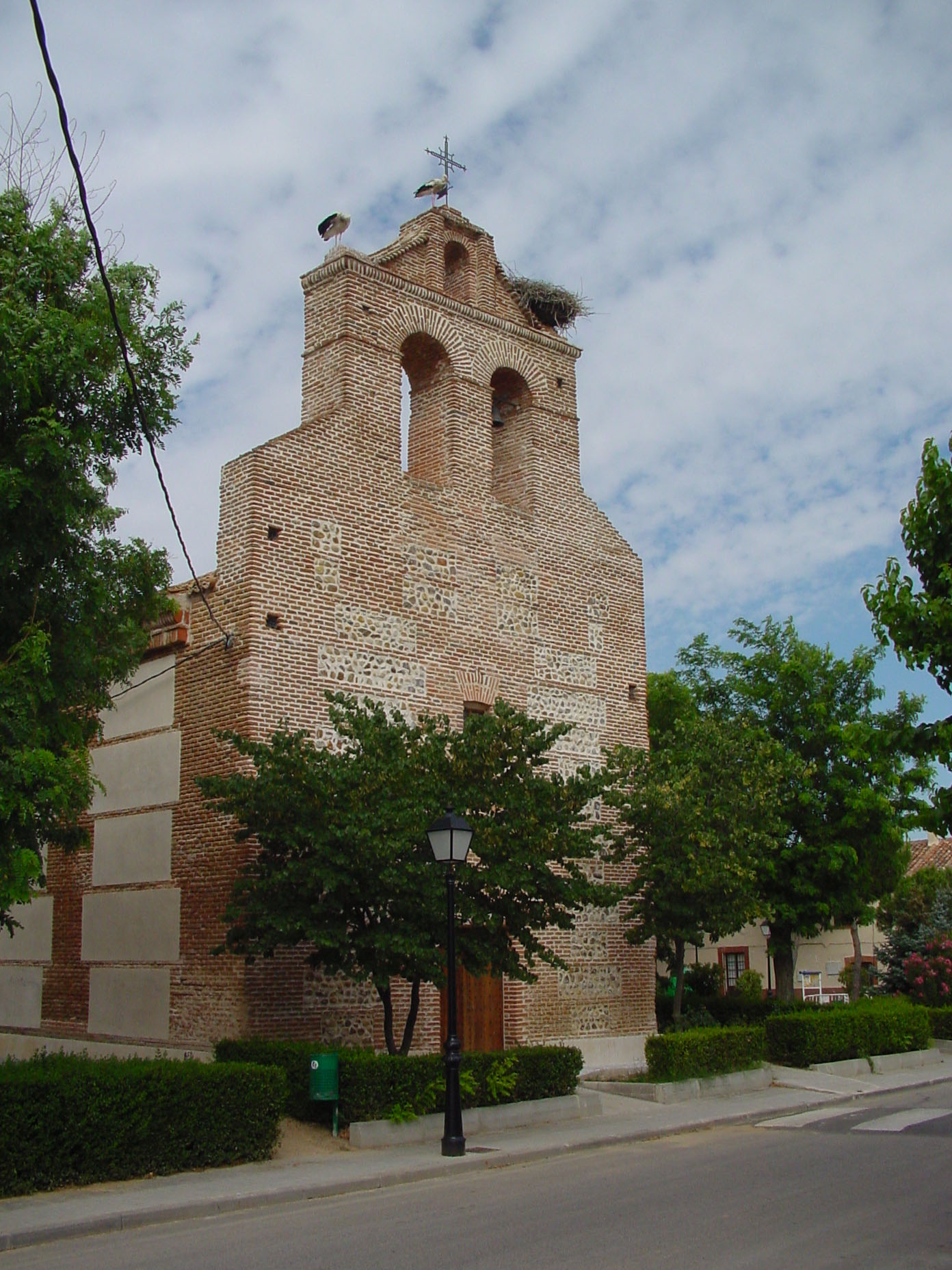

- Location within Spain
- 40.622077°N 3.40128°W
- Location: Fresno de Torote, Spain

Spanish Cultural Heritage
- Official name: Iglesia de San Esteban
- Type: Non-movable
- Criteria: Monument
- Designated: 1996
- Reference no.: RI-51-0009178

The Church of San Esteban (Spanish: Iglesia de San Esteban) is a church located in Fresno de Torote, Spain. It was declared Bien de Interés Cultural on 21 February 1996.

== Description ==
Built in the late 16th-early 17th century, it is an example of late Mudéjar-Renaissance architecture.

The main façade stands out on the exterior, featuring a simple brick bell gable with a single section and two semicircular arches. It is topped with a pediment, in the center of which is a small semicircular opening. The original entrance is now walled up. Currently, access is gained from the right side through a low, semicircular arch.

The temple reflects the stylistic characteristics of Mudejar architecture with Renaissance influences; chronologically, it can be dated between the late 16th and early 17th centuries.

The church preserves a simple octagonal plaster pulpit, decorated with 16th- century boxed moldings.
