= Fresno de Torote =

- Municipality
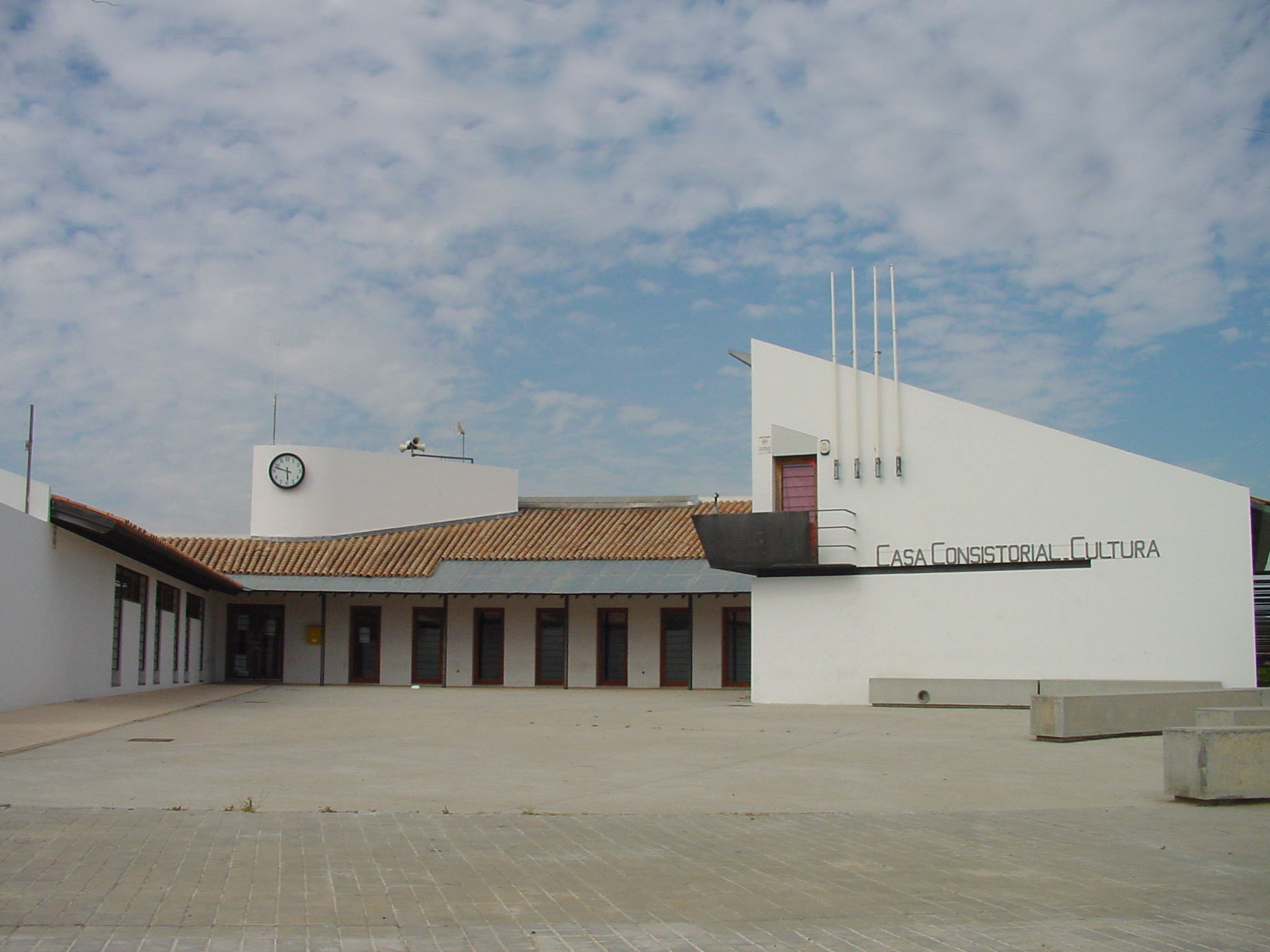
- City hall.

- Coat of arms

- Location in Spain
- Coordinates: 40°35′24″N 3°24′46″W
- Country: Spain
- Autonomous community: Community of Madrid
- Province: Madrid
- Comarca: Cuenca del Henares

Government
  - Mayor: Mariano Blancos Martín

Area
  - Total: 31.6 km^{2} (12.2 sq mi)
- Elevation: 639 m (2,096 ft)

Population (2025-01-01)
  - Total: 2,561
  - Density: 81.0/km^{2} (210/sq mi)
- Demonym: Fresneros
- Time zone: UTC+1 (CET)
  - Summer (DST): UTC+2 (CEST)
- Postal code: 28815

Fresno de Torote (Spanish: [ˈfɾesno ðe toˈɾote]) is a municipality of the autonomous community of Madrid in central Spain. It belongs to the comarca of Alcalá.

Sights include the church of San Esteban, in Mudéjar-Renaissance style.
