= List of Bienes de Interés Cultural in the Community of Madrid =

This is a list of Bien de Interés Cultural landmarks in the Province of Madrid, Spain.

== A ==
- Auditorium of Universidad Complutense

== B ==
- Banco Bilbao Vizcaya
- Basilica of la Asunción de Nuestra Señora (Colmenar Viejo)
- Bridge of Segovia (Madrid)
- Bridge of Toledo (Madrid)
- Buitrago del Lozoya (historic centre)
- Former Banco Central Hispano headquarters

== C ==
- Casino de Madrid
- Casita del Príncipe (El Escorial)
- Castle of Buitrago del Lozoya
- Cathedral of La Magdalena (Getafe)
- Cathedral of los Santos Niños Justo y Pastor de Alcalá de Henares
- Chapel of Obispo de Madrid
- Church of el Carmen (Madrid)
- Church of la Buena Dicha
- Church of la Natividad de Nuestra Señora (San Martín de la Vega)
- Church of la Natividad de Nuestra Señora, Valdetorres de Jarama
- Church of la Asunción de Nuestra Señora (Algete)
- Church of las Calatravas (Madrid)
- Church of Nuestra Señora de Montserrat
- Church of Nuestra Señora de la Asunción (Meco)
- Church of Sacramento (Madrid)
- Church of San Andrés (Madrid)
- Church of San Antonio de los Alemanes
- Church of San Antonio (Aranjuez)
- Church of San Agustín (Madrid)
- Church of San Fermín de los Navarros
- Church of San Francisco de Sales (Madrid)
- Church of San Ginés de Arlés (Madrid)
- Church of San José (Madrid)
- Church of San Manuel y San Benito (Madrid)
- Church of San Marcos (Madrid)
- Church of San Martín (Madrid)
- Church of San Nicolás (Madrid)
- Church of San Pedro Ad-vincula
- Church of Santa Teresa y San José (Madrid)
- Círculo de Bellas Artes
- Colegio del Pilar (Madrid)
- Convent of las Comendadoras de Santiago (Madrid)
- Convent of las Monjas Trinitarias Descalzas
- Convent of Madres Reparadoras
- Convent of San Plácido (Madrid)
- Convent of Santa Isabel
- Cuartel del Conde-Duque

== E ==
- Edificio Capitol
- Escuelas Pías de San Fernando

== F ==
- Faculty of Philosophy and Letters of the Complutense University
- Four Seasons Hotel Madrid

== G ==
- Gate of la Latina
- Gate of Toledo
- Geological and Mining Institute of Spain
- Goyeneche Palace, Nuevo Baztán

== H ==
- Hermitage of Santa María la Antigua (Madrid)
- Hermitage of the Solitude
- Hermitage of Virgen del Puerto (Madrid)
- Homeopathic Institute and Hospital of San José
- Hospital del Niño Jesús
- Hospital of la Venerable Orden Tercera
- Hospital of Maudes
- Hotel Palace
- House of Gallardo
- House of Hermanitas de los Pobres
- House of las Siete Chimeneas
- House of Sombrerete
- House-Museum of Lope de Vega

== I ==
- Instituto Lope de Vega
- Instituto Valencia of Don Juan
- International Institute (Madrid)

== L ==
- La Fuentecilla (Madrid)
- La Niña de los Peines
- La Fiesta de los Toros

== M ==
- Market of San Miguel
- Ministry of Agriculture building
- Monastery of Corpus Christi las Carboneras
- Museo de Arte Contemporáneo (Madrid)
- Museo del Traje
- Museo Nacional de Artes Decorativas
- Museum Cerralbo
- Museum of Lázaro Galdiano

== N ==
- National Museum of Romanticism (Madrid)

== O ==
- Old Medicine School of San Carlos
- Oratory of Caballero de Gracia

== P ==
- Palace of Altamira (Madrid)
- Palace of Bauer
- Palace of Canto del Pico (Torrelodones)
- Palace of Communication
- Palace of Duques de Pastrana
- Palace of la Bolsa de Madrid
- Palace of Linares
- Palace of Longoria
- Palace of Marqués de Grimaldi
- Palace of marqués de Miraflores
- Palace of Parcent
- Palace of Santoña (Madrid)
- Palace of the Marquis of Molins
- Palace of Villahermosa
- Palace of Villamejor
- Palacio de la Marquesa de Sonora
- Palacio de Velázquez
- Palacio de Villena (Cadalso de los Vidrios)
- Paseo del Prado

== R ==
- Real Casa de la Aduana
- Real Hospicio de San Fernando
- Royal Academy of Pharmacy
- Royal Monastery of Santa Isabel
- Royal Tapestry Factory
- Ruins of Talamanca

== S ==
- San Cayetano Church, Madrid
- San Sebastian Church, Madrid
- School of Mining Engineering of Madrid
- Spanish Cultural Heritage Institute
- St. Michael's Basilica (Madrid)

== T ==
- Theatre of María Guerrero

== W ==
- Watchtower of Arrebatacapas
- Watchtower of Torrelodones
- Watchtower of Venturada
