= Jorge Inglés =

Spanish painter

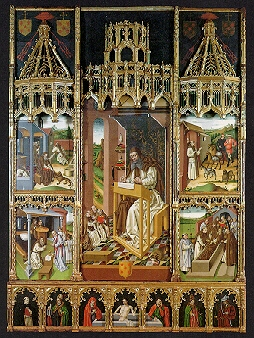
St. Jerome retable

Jorge Inglés (fl c. 1450) was a painter and illuminator who was active in Castile in the mid–15th century.

== Biography ==
His birth and death dates are unknown. On the basis of his name, which means 'English', it is believed that Inglés may have been born in England. From his style it has been inferred that the artist possibly trained in the Low Countries.

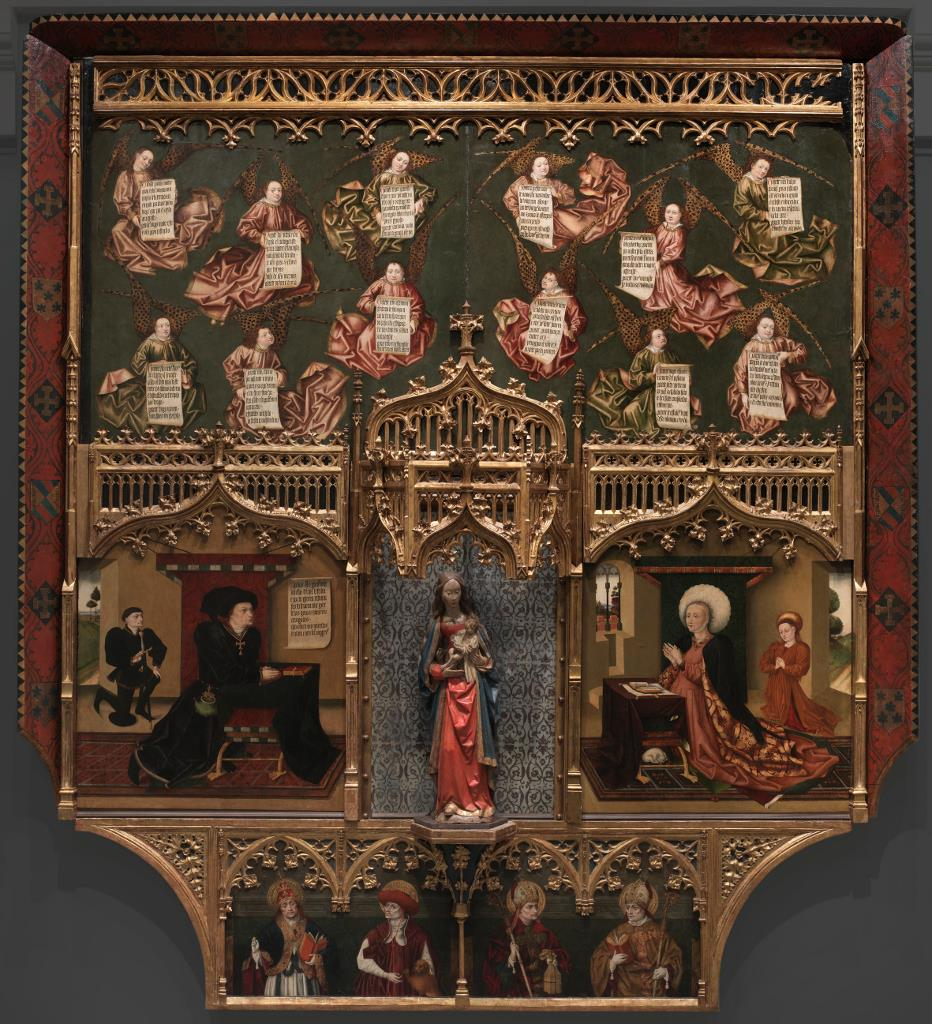
Los Gozos de Santa María

The only documentary evidence on this painter is the codicil to a will of Íñigo López de Mendoza, 1st Marquis of Santillana, dated 6 June 1455. The codicil records that prior to June 1455 the Marquis commissioned Jorge Inglés to paint the Altarpiece of the Gozos de Santa María or of the Marquis of Santillana for the chapel of the Castle of Buitrago del Lozoya. The altarpiece is regarded as the earliest Hispano-Flemish painting in Spain. The choice of Jorge Inglés shows that he was already a well-known painter by that time.

== Work ==
=== General ===
The work of Jorge Inglés reveals his intimate knowledge of Flemish painting, particularly of the work of Rogier van der Weyden, and of Flemish tapestries and manuscript illumination. He was the first painter in Castile known by name to employ the Netherlandish technique of oil on panel. His drawing technique was bold and his figures have a sculptural and expressive quality, particularly in the faces and hands. He was very skilled in rendering sumptuous clothes and the characteristics of Spanish brocades.

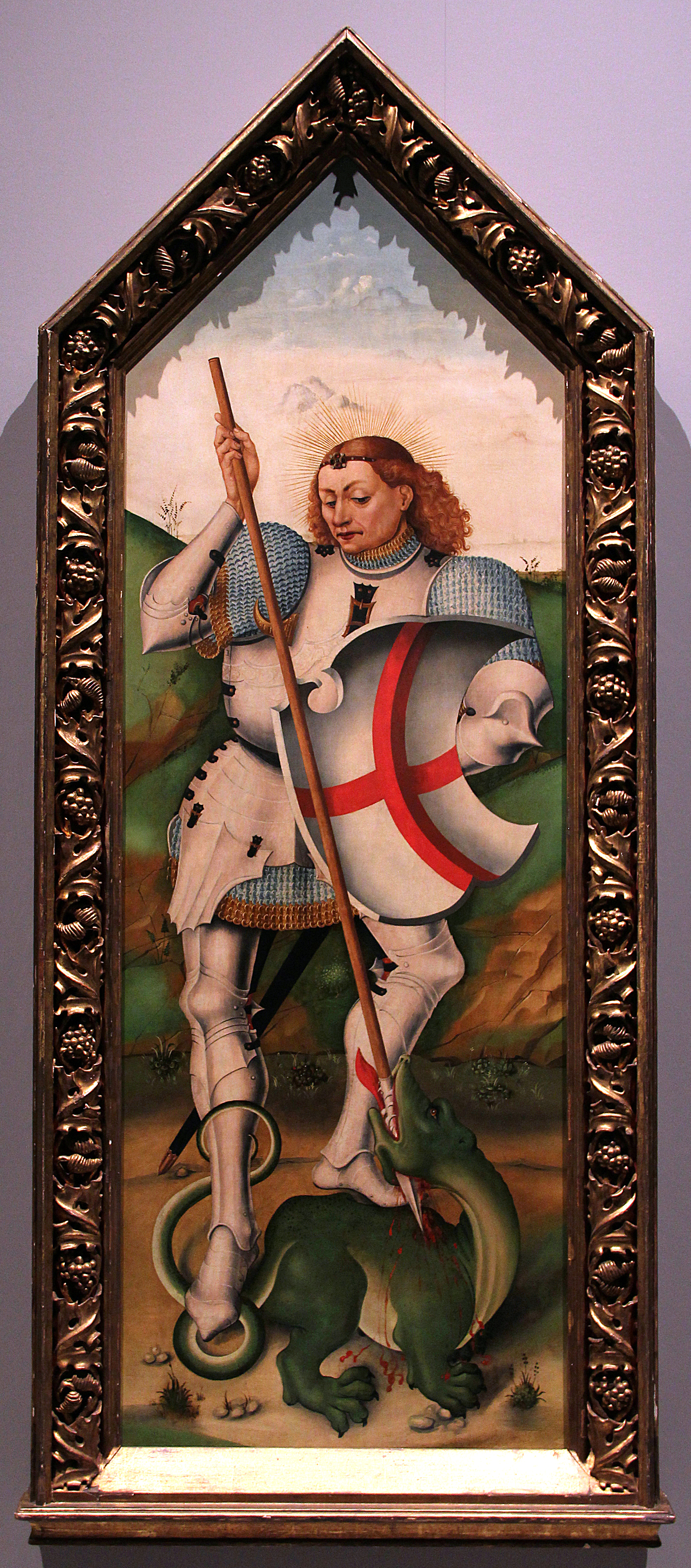
St George and the Dragon

Jorge Inglés enlarged the settings in his compositions through the use of bold perspective effects. He filled the interiors with carpets, flagstones and canopies. He paid attention to details to suggest atmosphere and usually created openings to reveal a landscape in the distance.

=== Altarpiece of the Gozos de Santa María ===
Íñigo López de Mendoza, who commissioned the Altarpiece of the Gozos de Santa María, was a major poet and devotee of science. López de Mendoza was also particularly devoted to his family and the Virgin. The latter is reflected in his devotional verses known as the Gozos de Santa María, which inspired the altarpiece. Some of the verses are inscribed on the scrolls carried by the angels at the top of the composition.

The altarpiece retains part of the original structure and traceries and all the paintings executed by Jorge Inglés. Above the predella with the busts of the Fathers of the Church, Íñigo López de Mendoza himself is depicted. This is the only surviving painted portrait of a Castilian nobleman. Also depicted is his wife, Catalina Suárez de Figueroa, kneeling before the Virgin. The image of the Virgin is a replacement of the original mid-15th-century Flemish image, which is lost. The Marquis and his wife are accompanied by their page and maid, respectively. This work has been on display since 2012 at the Museo del Prado thanks to an agreement with Íñigo de Arteaga y Martín, 19th Duke of the Infantado, its present owner.

=== Other works ===
Another work attributed to Inglés is the retable of St Jerome from the monastery in Olmedo, Valladolid, now residing in the National Sculpture Museum at the Colegio de San Gregorio. The seven predella panels include a St Sebastian with a curious hat. The main panel shows St Jerome in his study. The retable in the parish church of Villasandino (Burgos), of which fragments survive, may be Inglés' last work.

Jorge Inglés was responsible for various miniatures in manuscripts in the collection of Marqués’ Íñigo López de Mendoza.
