= María del Pilar Fernández Vega =

Spanish curator (1895–1973)

- Born: 8 November 1895; Villadiego, Burgos, Spain
- Died: 4 July 1973 (aged 77); Madrid, Spain
- Education: General and Technical Institute of Burgos
- Occupation: Museum curator
- Known for: First Spanish female museum curator
- Spouse: José Ferrandis Torres

María del Pilar Fernández Vega (Villadiego, Burgos, 8 November 1895 – Madrid, 4 July 1973) was a Spanish museum curator and the first female museum curator in Spain.

== Biography ==
Maria's mother, Filomena Vega Gutiérrez, was a teacher and her father, Felipe Fernández Roiz was secretary of the town councils of Humada and Los Barrios de Villadiego (Burgos), since at least 1890.

=== Education ===
In 1908, at almost 13 years of age, she took the entrance exam to study for her Bachelor's degree at the General and Technical Institute of Burgos. In addition, she passed three subjects at the Escuela Normal Superior de Burgos, which allowed her, once she had obtained her Bachelor's degree, to obtain the title of Higher Education Teacher. She studied Philosophy and Letters at the Universidad Central de Madrid between 1913 and 1918.

During the 1916–1917 academic year, she taught at the Instituto Internacional on the recommendation of Manuel Bartolomé Cossío. She then moved to Villablino where she worked as a teacher until 1920, when she returned to Madrid to prepare for the competitive examinations, residing at the Residencia de Señoritas, which was one of the few places for women to live while at the university.

After passing the competitive examinations in 1922, she entered the optional corps of Archivists, Librarians and Archaeologists, specializing in the study of collections of American origin. Her first assignment was to the Treasury Archive and Provincial Library of Logroño. She served in the Archives of the Ministry of State as well as in the General Debt Archives, both in Madrid.

She was a member of the Lyceum Club for Women, along with María de Maeztu, Victoria Kent and Isabel Oyarzábal, with whom she had been associated at the Residencia de Señoritas. She was also a member of the Ateneo de Madrid and frequented the circles of the Sociedad Española de Amigos del Arte and the salons of the magazine Blanco y Negro, where years later she declared that she had met Margarita Nelken.

=== Curator ===
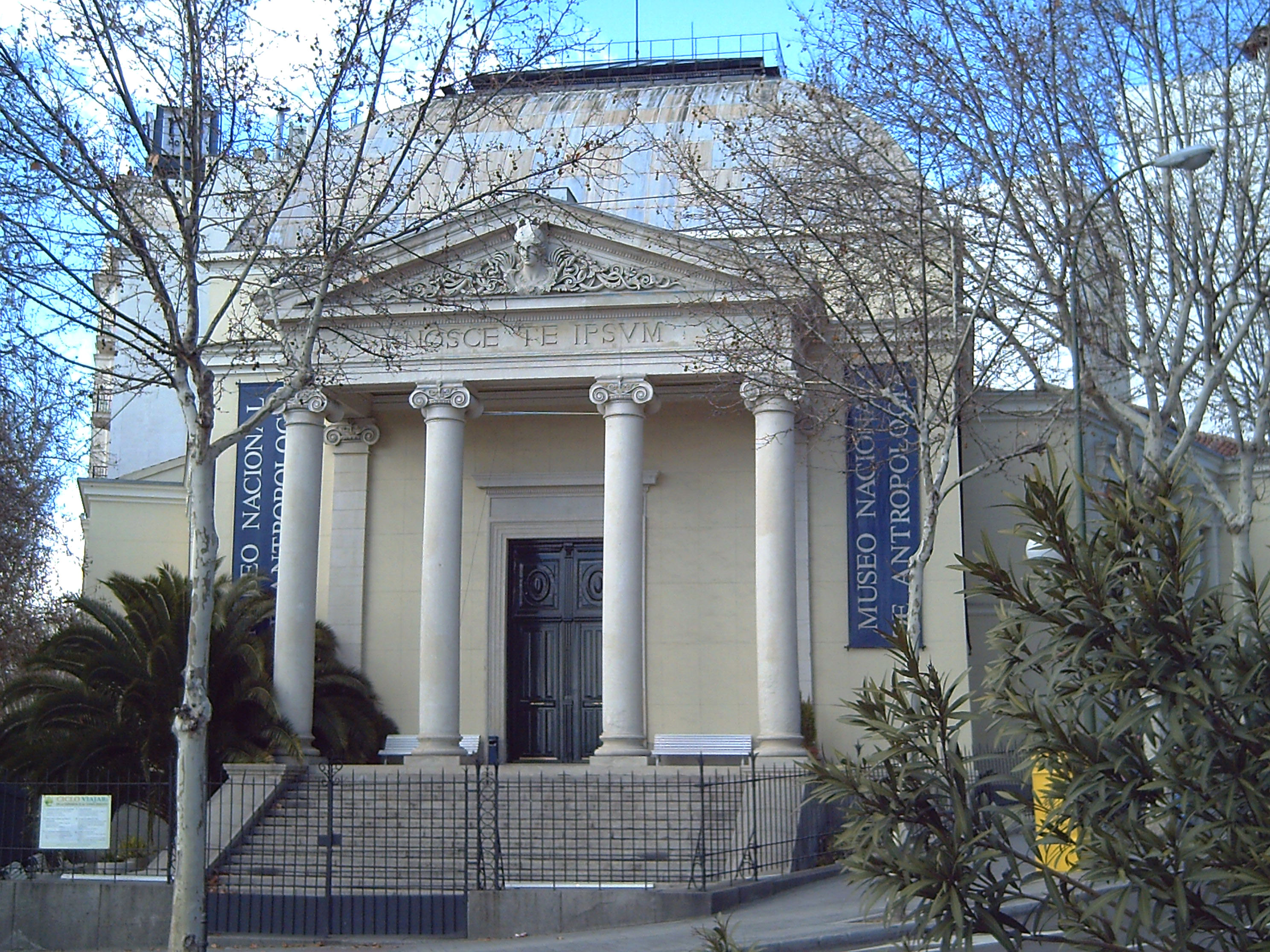
Spanish National Museum of Anthropology, in Madrid.

In 1928, she requested a transfer to the National Archaeological Museum (MAN), where she held the position of head of the Pre-Columbian section, becoming the first woman curator of a museum in Spain. In the 1930s she would be joined by Felipa Niño Mas and Joaquina Eguaras Ibáñez in 1930 and Concepción Blanco Mínguez and Ursicina Martínez Gallego in 1931. Only since 1910 had Spain recognized the right of women to access official education without legal restrictions and the recognition of the university degree to practice professionally in public institutions under the Ministry of Public Instruction and Fine Arts. There were two royal orders, one on 8 March and the other on 2 September 1910, published in the Madrid Gazette on 9 March and 4 September 1910 respectively.

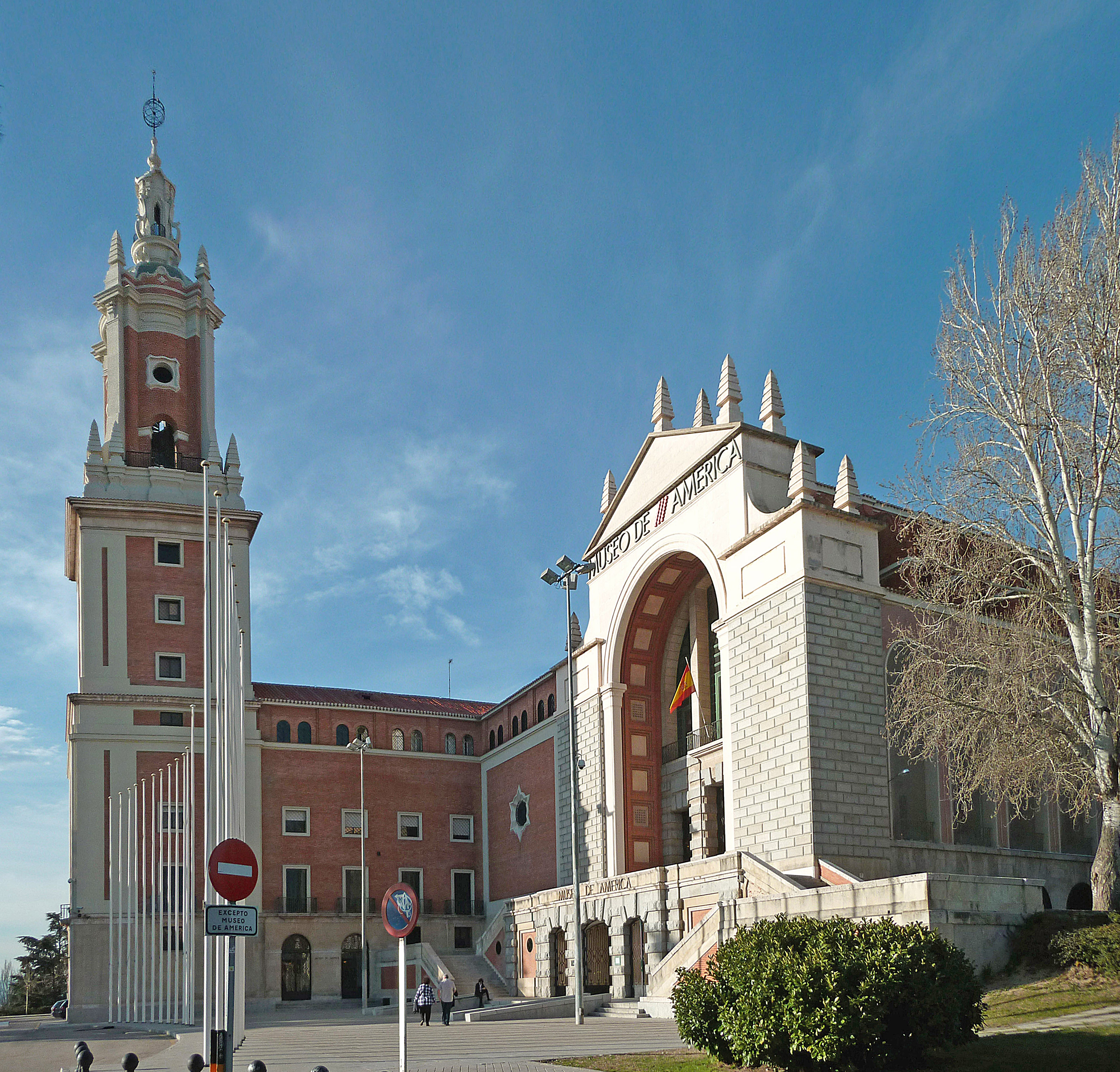
Museum of the Americas in Madrid.

She participated as a professor in the 1933 Mediterranean University Cruise which visited destinations such as New York in 1934 and the USSR (for 13 days) in 1935. One achievement of the trip was that it attracted many Spaniards to Spanish archaeology. In 1934, Pilar Fernández applied for a grant for a four-month study trip to New York to see the American art collections in the city's museums.

During the Spanish Civil War she worked at the Archaeological Museum of Valladolid. With the end of the Civil War, Franco's repressive machinery targeted her and prosecuted her by a War Council. Its goal was to purge civil servants opposing the new regime, but the examining magistrate concluded that Pilar Fernández did not fall within any of the cases typified by the Law of Political Responsibilities and proposed that she be declared exempt from political responsibility. The case was closed in February 1945.

After the war, she returned to the National Archaeological Museum, and then moved to the National Museum of Decorative Arts, combining her position there with that of interim director of the Museum of America, from the time of her appointment in 1941 until 1968. This museum was installed on the grounds of the University City and inaugurated in 1944.

=== Personal life ===
She was married to José Ferrandis Torres.

== Publications ==
- She published two monographs on the American collections of the MAN (Acquisitions in 1930: Peruvian textiles from the collection of Messrs. Schmidt and Pizarro, Lima in 1933 and the Catalogue of the exhibition of Inca Art (Juan Larrea Collection) in 1935, the latter together with H. Trimborn).
- Guide to the Museum of America, 1965. Publisher: Ministry of National Education, General Directorate of Fine Arts.
