= Convento del Carmen Calzado (Madrid) =

Convent in Madrid, Spain

Coordinates: 40.4188°N 3.7033°W

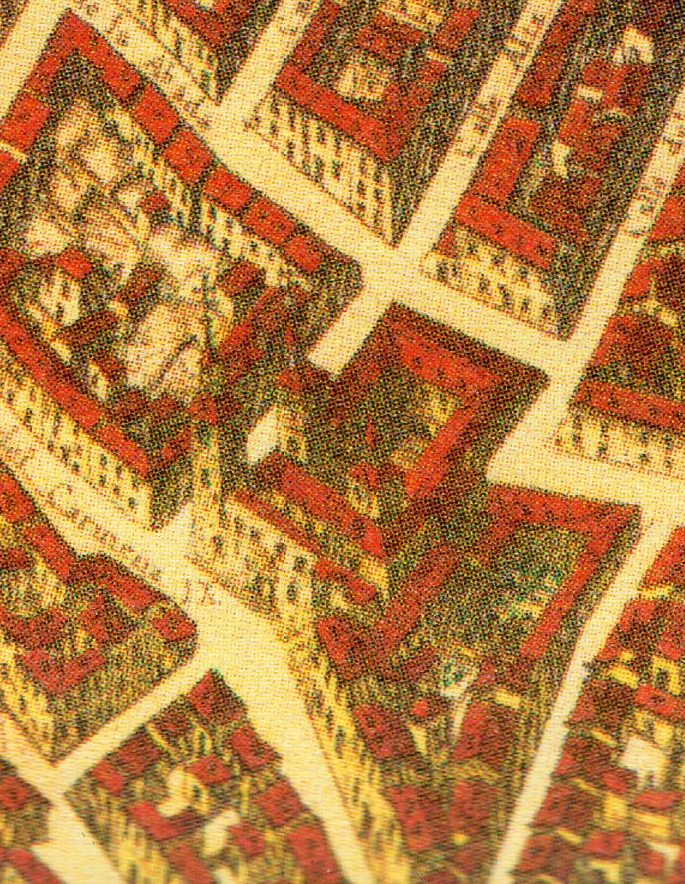
Convento del Carmen Calzado in the Plan of Madrid by Teixeira of 1656

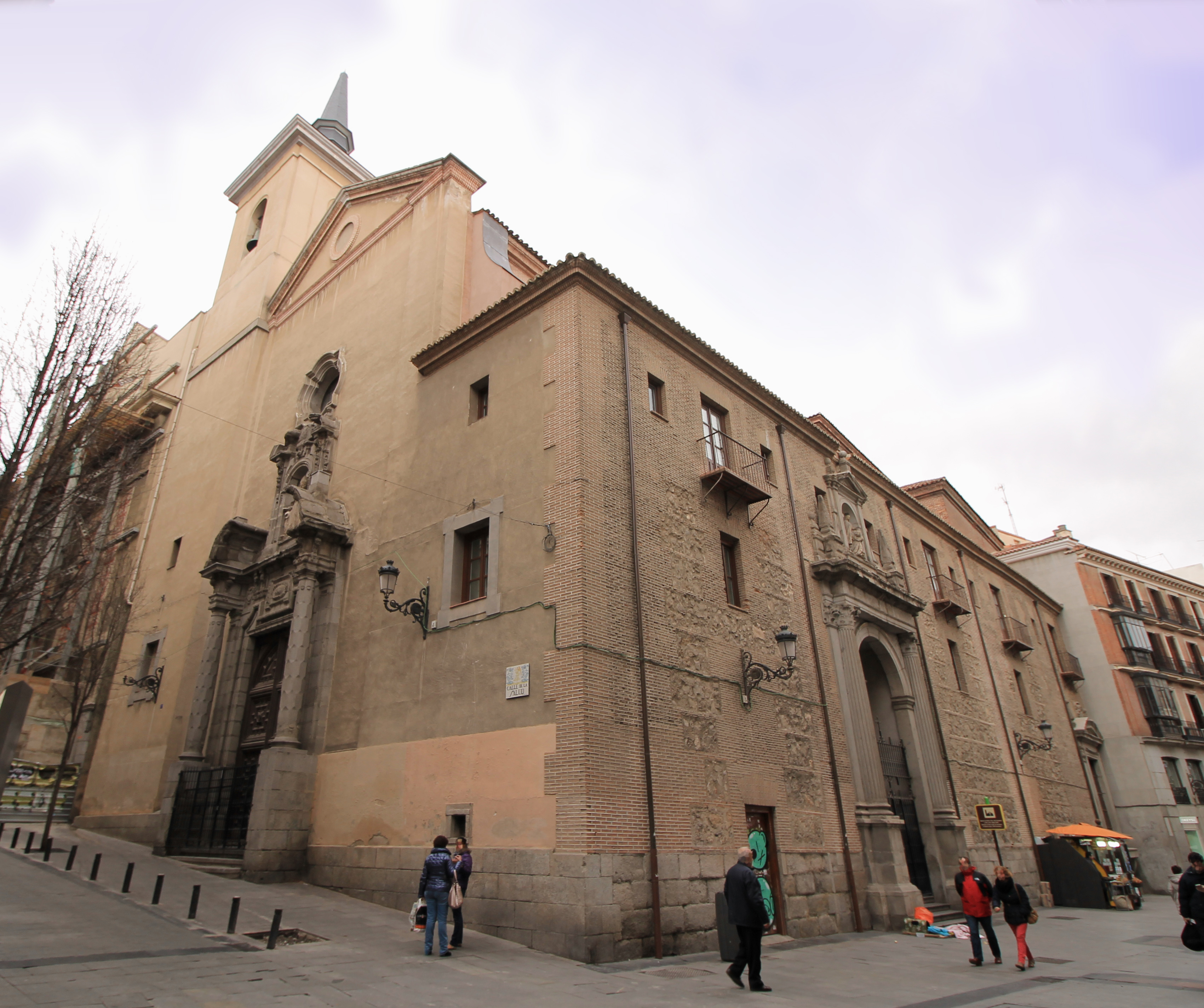
The Parish church del Carmen is the only remain that survives from the old convent.

The Convento del Carmen Calzado (English for Convent of the Calced Carmel) was a convent in the Order of Mount Carmel. It was located in the area currently occupied by the Plaza del Carmen in Madrid. This convent was founded in 1573. The Spanish confiscation during the late 19th century left only the Parish church del Carmen and the ensanche (widening) of the area of Plaza del Carmen (which takes its name from this convent). One of the ten streets leading to the Puerta del Sol, and passing next to the facade of the parish church, is called Calle del Carmen. The site of the convent was dedicated to the Frontón Central, which would become the Cine Madrid.

== History ==
In 1541, a Madrilenian brothel owned by María de Peralta and Francisco Jiménez was evicted and demolished by King Philip II. On the site rose the Convento del Carmen Calzado. The convent was founded in 1575 with the patronage of the king and his sister Joanna of Austria, Princess of Portugal. Author Ramón de Mesonero Romanos alludes in 1831 to its creation in his Manual de Madrid:

"In 1575 was founded this convent by religion, contributing to it the villa of Madrid, in the same place that occupied the prostitutes' house. The temple is one of the largest and of best architecture that has Madrid, with good chapels and effigies"

— Ramón de Mesonero Romanos

Initially, the convent was under the patronage of Saint Damasus who was popularly called Carmen Calzado by the Order. The inaugural mass was conducted by Papal Nuncio Juan Bautista Castaneo, later (1590) Pope Urban VII. The proximity of the convent to the Puerta del Sol, increased its popularity, sharing the limelight with the Convento de San Felipe el Real.

Between 1611 and 1640 the building was renovated by architect Miguel de Soria. In 1836, the convent property and its contents were seized under the Mendizábal confiscations. Its inhabitants were secularized and the church building survived as Parish church Nuestra Señora del Carmen y San Luis.

== See also ==
- Catholic Church in Spain
