= Hermitage of the Solitude =

Cultural property in Fuente el Saz de Jarama

- Hermitage
- Spanish: Ermita de la Soledad
- Ermita de la Soledad
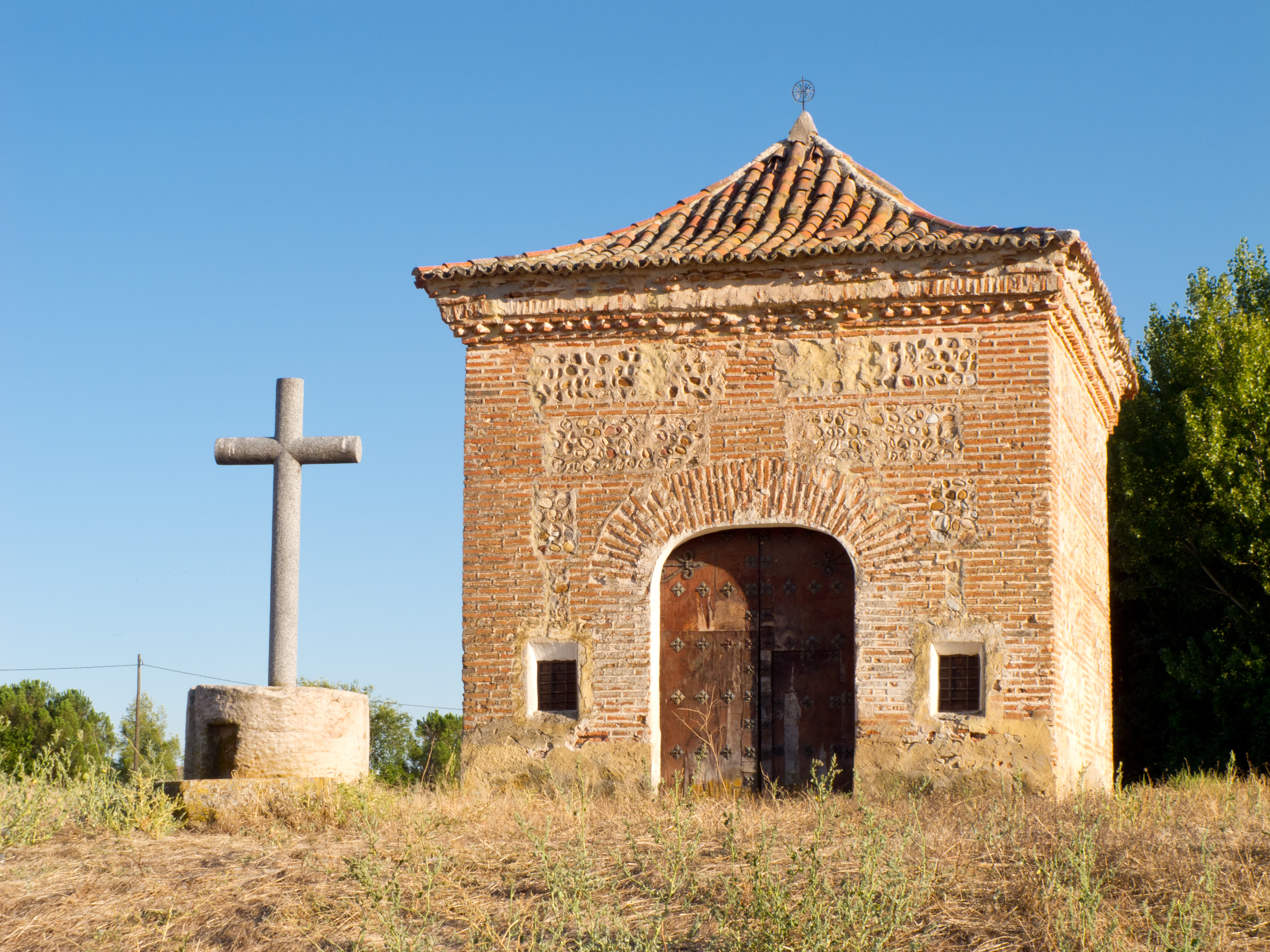
- Hermitage of the Solitude in Fuente el Saz de Jarama, Spain.
- Constructed: 16th century
- Location: Fuente el Saz de Jarama, Spain
- Interactive map of Hermitage of the Solitude
- Coordinates: 40°37′44″N 3°30′37″W

The Hermitage of the Solitude (Spanish: Ermita de la Soledad) is a hermitage located in the village of Fuente el Saz de Jarama, Community of Madrid, Spain. It is a very small building of an almost squared ground plan, with hipped roof and walls constructed with masonry bonding.

The front facade is simple, presenting an elliptical arch door, situated between two small lattice gaps. One of the side walls of the hermitage shows a similar arch, as if it had been another previous entrance now blocked. Its appearance can recall a moorish marabout, and the most valuable feature of the hermitage is the inner wooden coffer ceiling in the shape of a trough, of great quality knot carpentry.

In 1995, it was declared Heritage of cultural interest (Bien de Interés Cultural), within the category of monument, and it is listed with code RI-51-0009113.
