= Homeopathic Institute and Hospital of San José =

- Instituto Homeopático y Hospital de San José (Spanish)
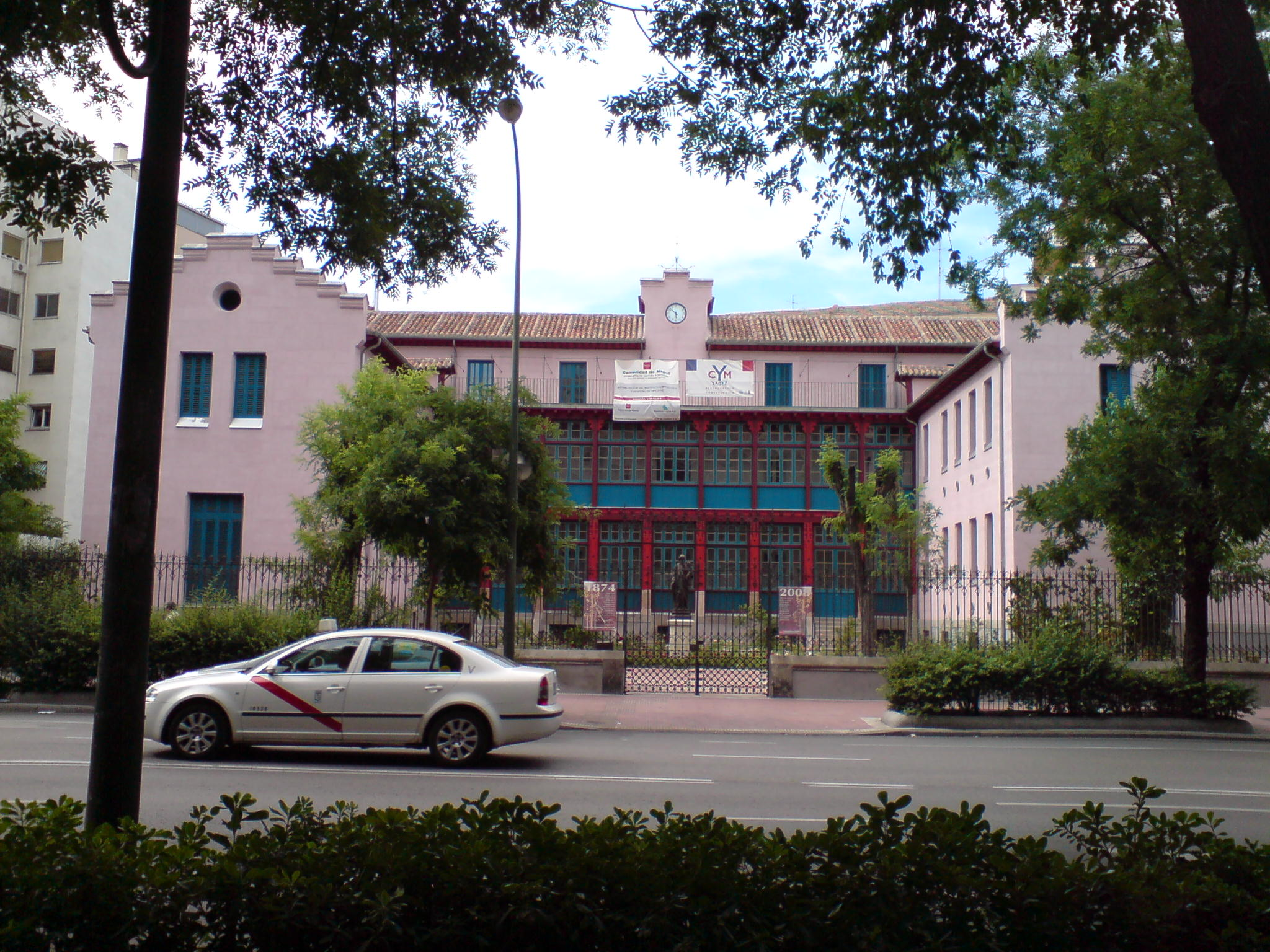

- Location within Spain
- 40.434018°N 3.703391°W
- Location: Madrid, Spain

Spanish Cultural Heritage
- Official name: Instituto Homeopático y Hospital de San José
- Type: Non-movable
- Criteria: Monument
- Designated: 1997
- Reference no.: RI-51-0009958

The Homeopathic Institute and Hospital of San José (Spanish: Instituto Homeopático y Hospital de San José) is a Spanish homeopathic facility founded in the 19th century. It is located in the Chamberí district of Madrid.

The hospital received patronage from the Spanish royal family including Isabella, Princess of Asturias.

== Architecture ==
Its building, designed by José Segundo de Lema, was given a heritage listing, Bien de Interés Cultural in 1997.
