= House of Hermanitas de los Pobres =

House of the Little Sisters of the Poor
- Asilo de Hermanitas de los Pobres (Spanish)
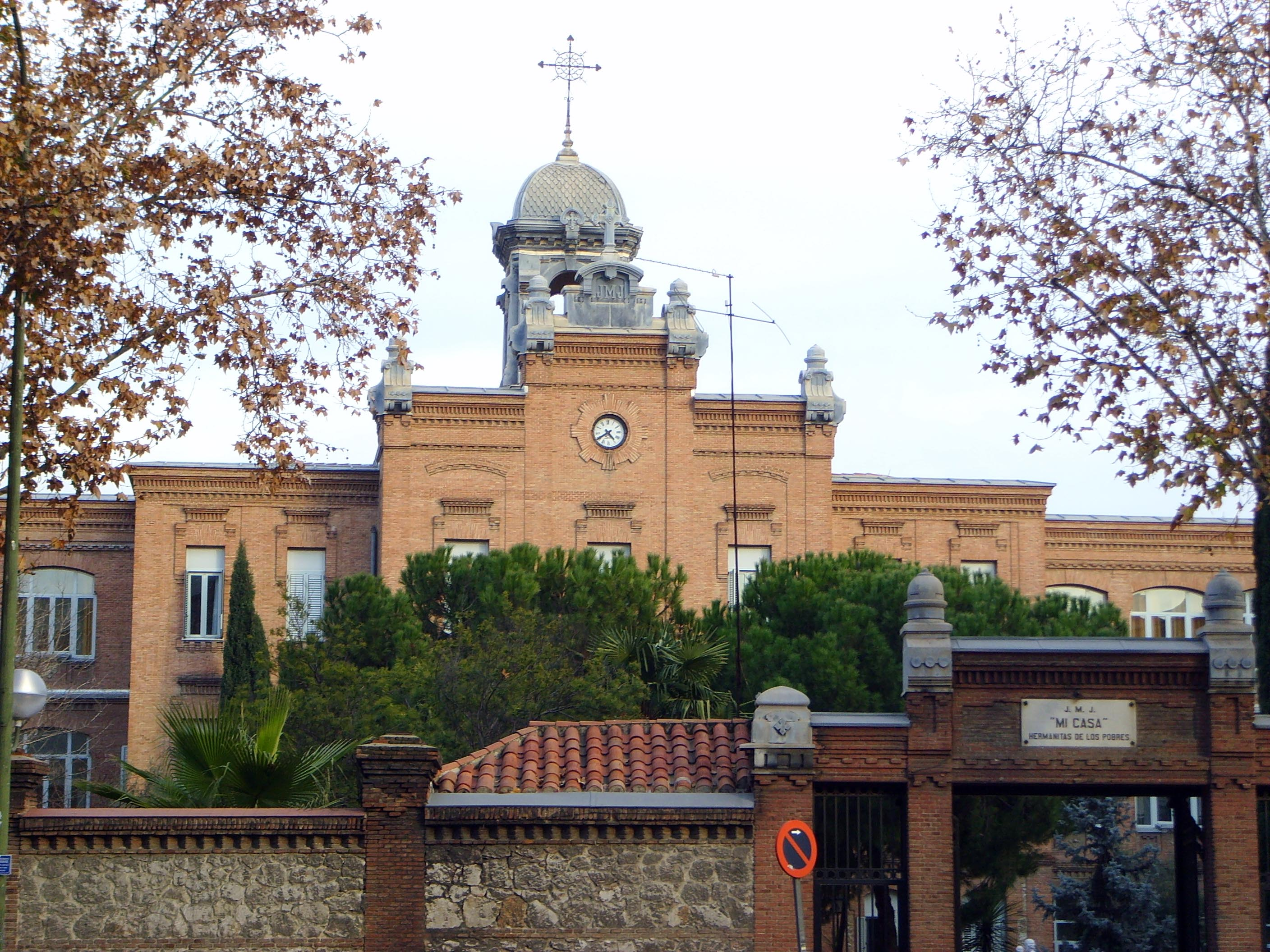

- Location within Spain
- 40.422416°N 3.668146°W
- Location: Madrid, Spain

Site notes
- Architect: Ricardo García Guereta

Spanish Cultural Heritage
- Official name: Asilo de Hermanitas de los Pobres
- Type: Non-movable
- Criteria: Monument
- Designated: 1996
- Reference no.: RI-51-0009578

The House of the Little Sisters of the Poor (Spanish: Asilo de Hermanitas de los Pobres), also known as Mi Casa, is a residence for elderly people in the Salamanca district of Madrid, Spain. It is run by the Little Sisters of the Poor, who also run a similarly named facility in the Chamberi district.

The building was designed by Ricardo Garcia Guereta, and has neo-mudejar features.
