= Watchtower of Arrebatacapas =

Cultural property in Torrelaguna, Spain

- Atalaya de Arrebatacapas (Spanish)
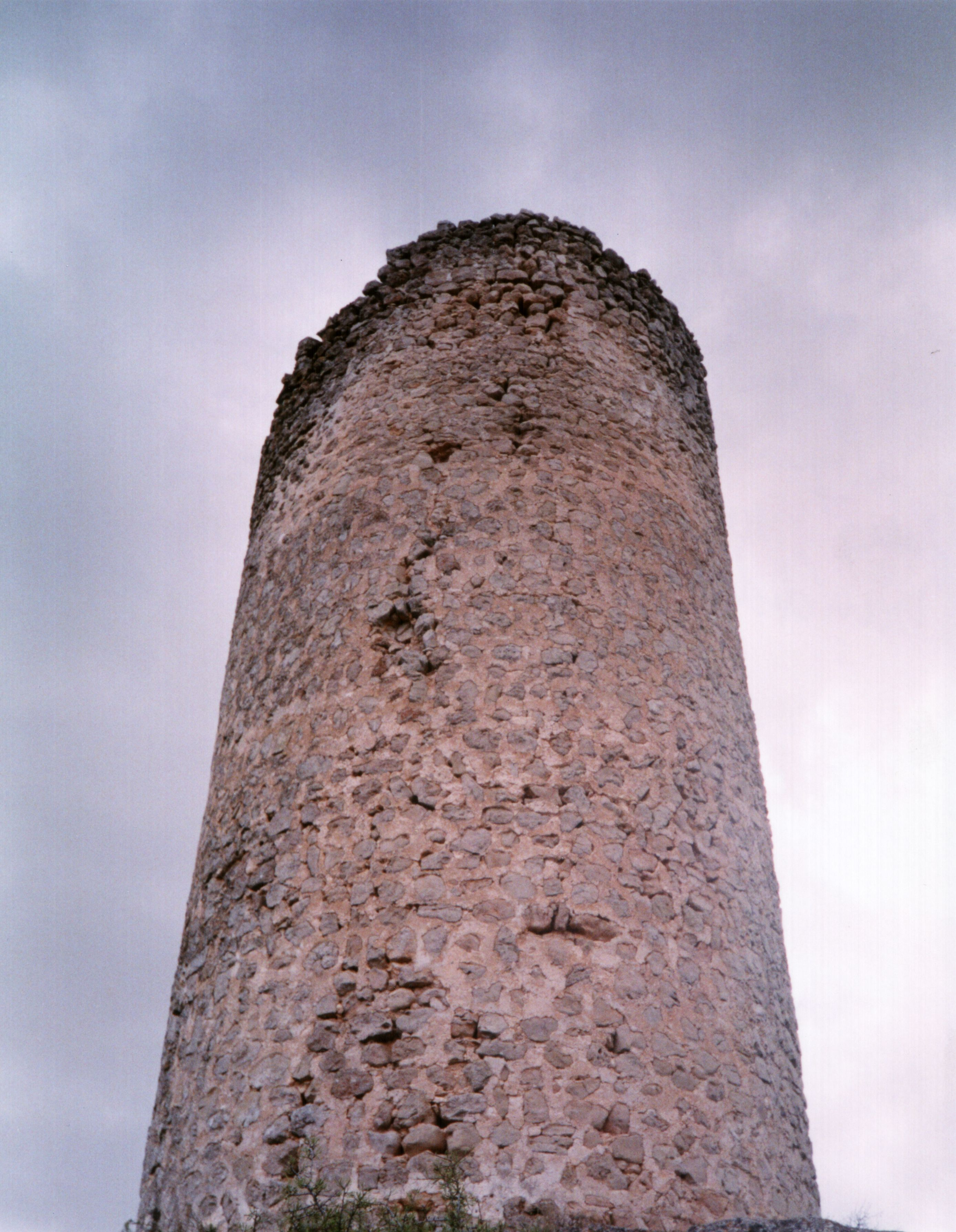

- Location within Spain
- 40.837256°N 3.568747°W
- Location: Torrelaguna, Spain

Spanish Cultural Heritage
- Official name: Atalaya de Arrebatacapas
- Type: Non-movable
- Criteria: Monument
- Designated: 1983
- Reference no.: RI-51-0004934

The Watchtower of Arrebatacapas (Spanish: Atalaya de Arrebatacapas) is a watchtower located in Torrelaguna, Spain. It was declared a National Historic-Artistic Monument in 1983 and later a Bien de Interés Cultural.
