= La Buena Dicha =

Cultural property in Madrid, Spain

Coordinates: 40.4217°N 3.7061°W

Church of la Buena Dicha
- Iglesia de la Buena Dicha (Spanish)
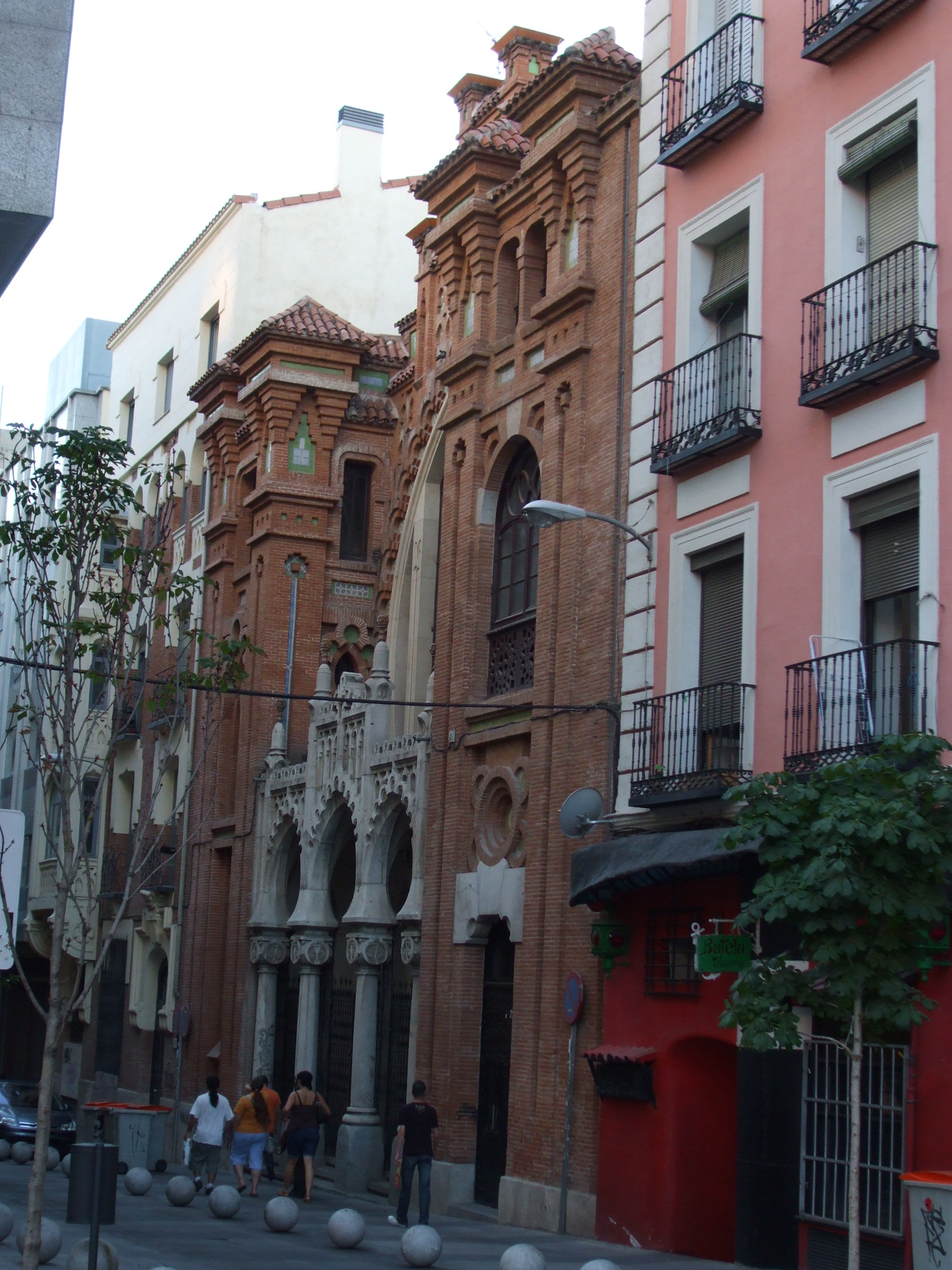
- Interactive map of Church of la Buena Dicha
- Location: Madrid, Spain

Spanish Cultural Heritage
- Official name: Iglesia de la Buena Dicha
- Type: Non-movable
- Criteria: Monument
- Designated: 1994
- Reference no.: RI-51-0008657

The Church of la Buena Dicha (Spanish: Iglesia de la Buena Dicha) is a church located in Madrid, Spain.

It was built in 1914–1917 at the site of a former hospital and church. The architectural style is eclectic with Gothic Revival influence. The building was declared Bien de Interés Cultural in 1994.

== See also ==
- Catholic Church in Spain
- List of oldest church buildings
