= Watchtower of Venturada =

Cultural property in Venturada, Spain

- Atalaya de Venturada (Spanish)
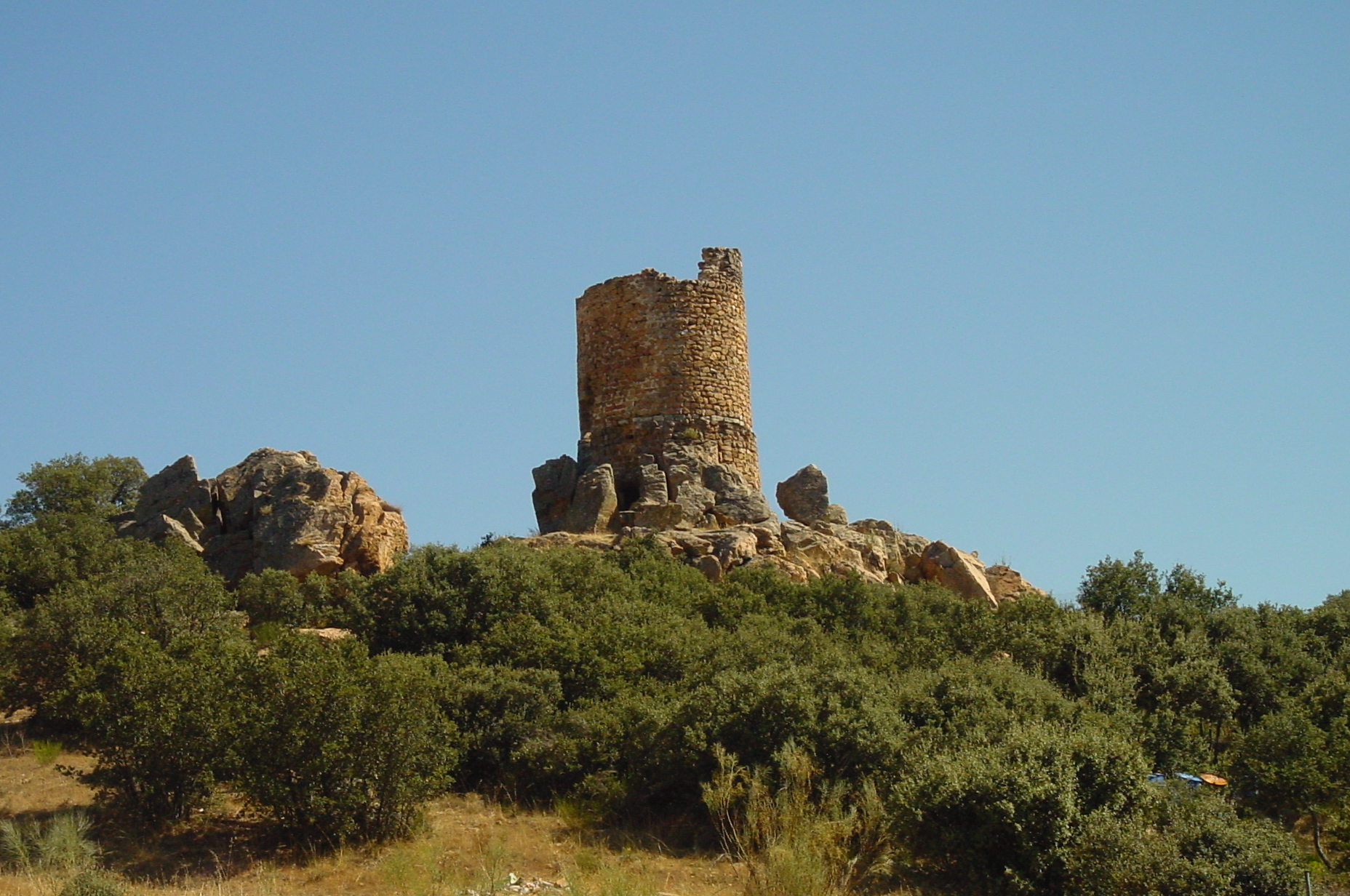

- Location within Spain
- 40.78671°N 3.607896°W
- Location: Venturada, Spain

Spanish Cultural Heritage
- Official name: Atalaya de Venturada
- Type: Non-movable
- Criteria: Monument
- Designated: 1983
- Reference no.: RI-51-0004936

The Watchtower of Venturada (Spanish: Atalaya de Venturada) is a watchtower located in Venturada, Spain. It was declared a National Historic-Artistic Monument by Royal Decree in 1983 and under Law 16/1985 on Spanish Historical Heritage, it was subsequently recognized as a Bien de Interés Cultural. The tower, built atop a rock outcrop, is 9.2 m tall, 5.7 m in diameter and the walls are 1.34m thick.
