= Hospital of la Venerable Orden Tercera =

- Hospital de la Venerable Orden Tercera (Spanish)
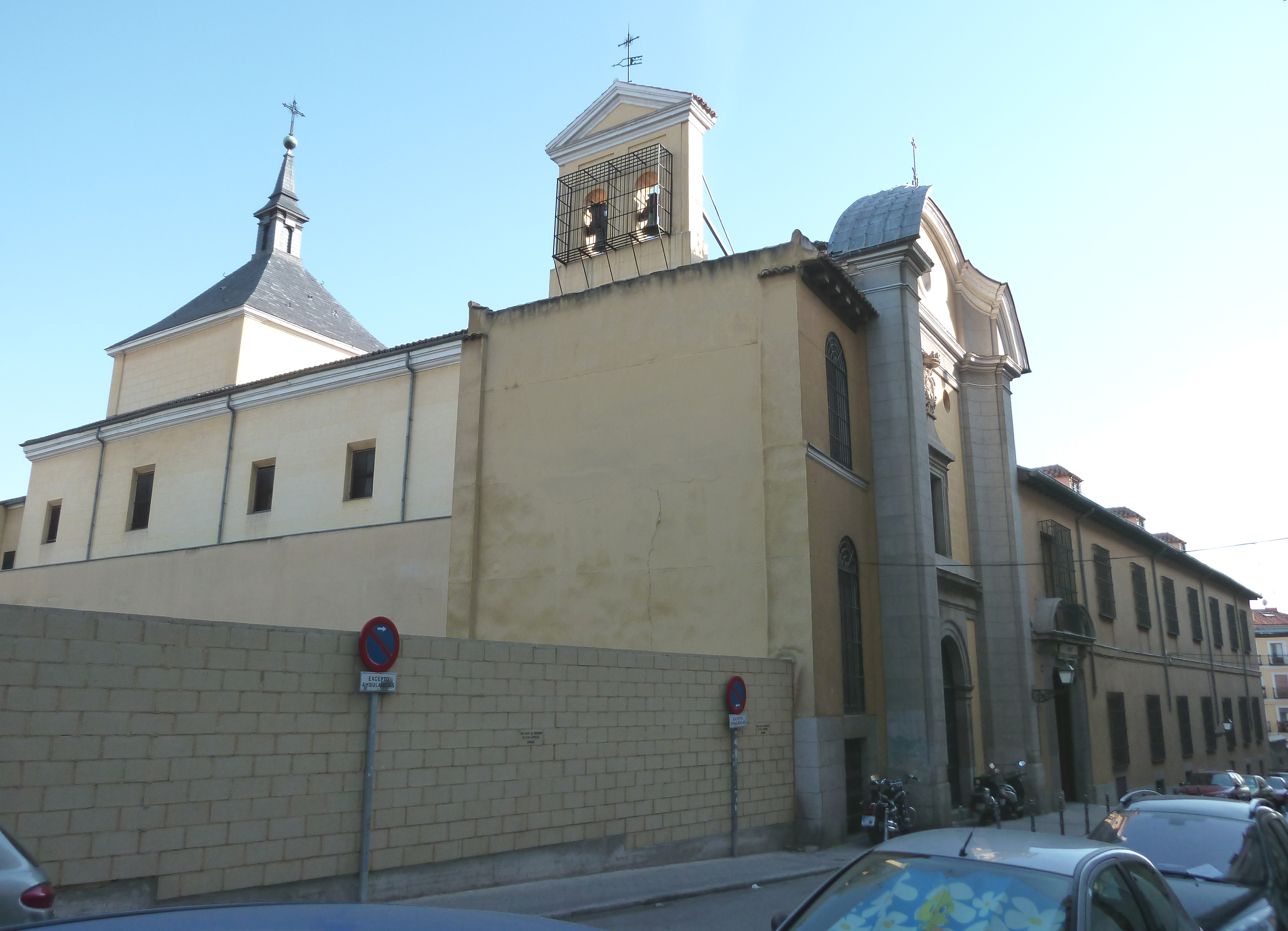

- Location within Spain
- 40.408812°N 3.714281°W
- Location: Madrid, Spain

Spanish Cultural Heritage
- Official name: Hospital de la Venerable Orden Tercera
- Type: Non-movable
- Criteria: Monument
- Designated: 1995
- Reference no.: RI-51-0009063

The Hospital of la Venerable Orden Tercera (Spanish: Hospital de la Venerable Orden Tercera) is a former hospital located in Madrid, Spain. It was declared Bien de Interés Cultural in 1995.
