= Palacio de Villena (Cadalso de los Vidrios) =

Spanish monument

Palace of Villena
- Palacio de Villena (Spanish)
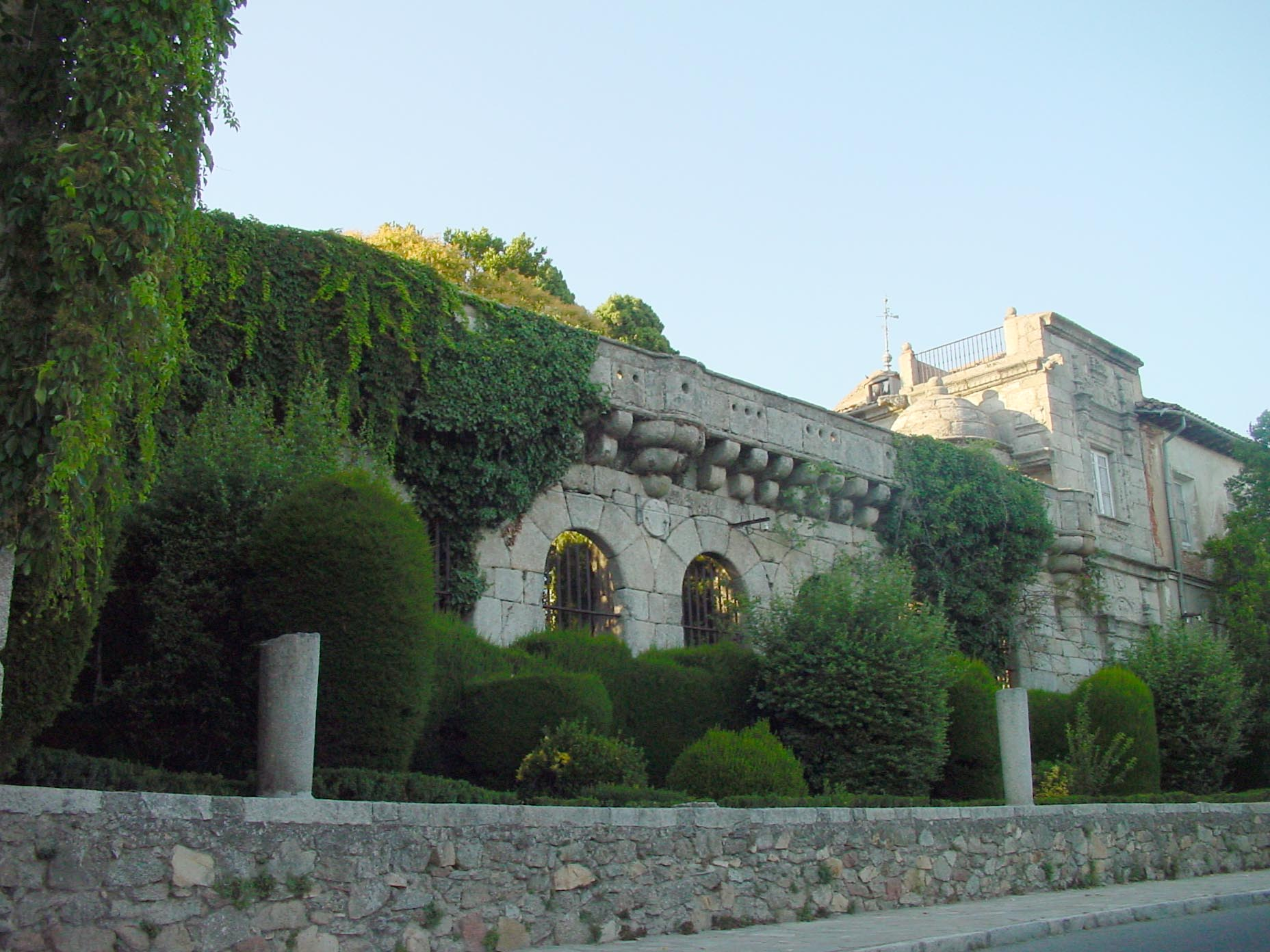

- Location within Spain
- 40.300454°N 4.444379°W
- Location: Cadalso de los Vidrios, Spain

Spanish Cultural Heritage
- Official name: Palacio de Villena
- Type: Non-movable
- Criteria: Monument
- Designated: 1931
- Reference no.: RI-51-0000726

The Palace of Villena (Spanish: Palacio de Villena) is a palace located in Cadalso de los Vidrios, Spain. It was built by Álvaro de Luna, Duke of Trujillo.

The building and the gardens are separately listed as Bienes de Interés Cultural (Spain's national heritage listing). The building is listed as a monumento and has been protected since 1931, while the gardens are listed as a jardín histórico and have been protected since the 1970s.
