= Palace of marqués de Miraflores =

- Palacio del marqués de Miraflores (Spanish)
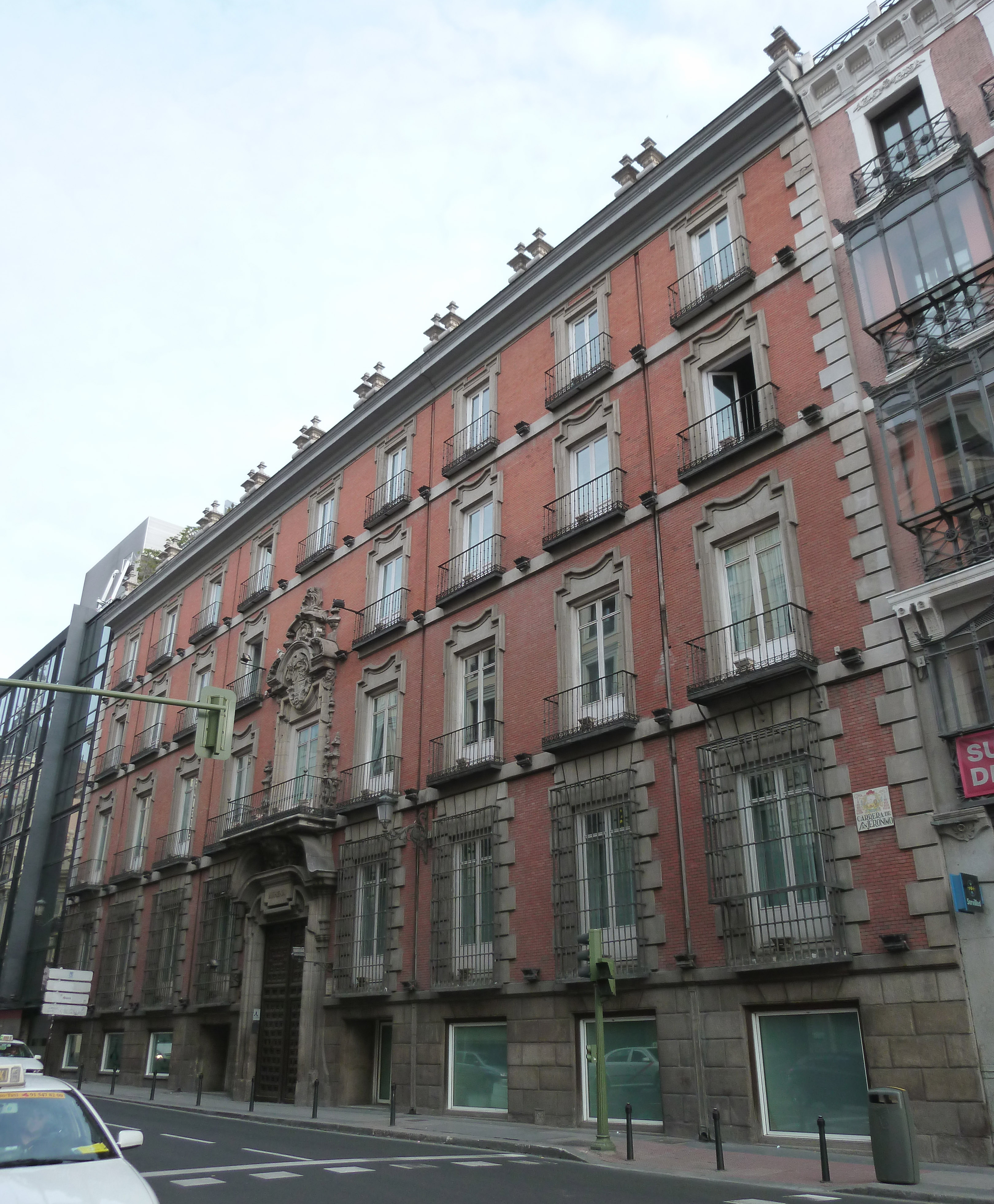

- Location within Spain
- 40.416635°N 3.699134°W
- Location: Madrid, Spain

Spanish Cultural Heritage
- Official name: Palacio del marqués de Miraflores
- Type: Non-movable
- Criteria: Monument
- Designated: 1976
- Reference no.: RI-51-0004231

The Palace of marqués de Miraflores (Spanish: Palacio del marqués de Miraflores) is a palace located in Madrid, Spain. It was declared Bien de Interés Cultural in 1976.
