= Church of St Peter ad Vincula, Madrid =

Church of St Peter ad Vincula (St Peter in Chains)
- Iglesia de San Pedro Ad-vincula (Spanish)
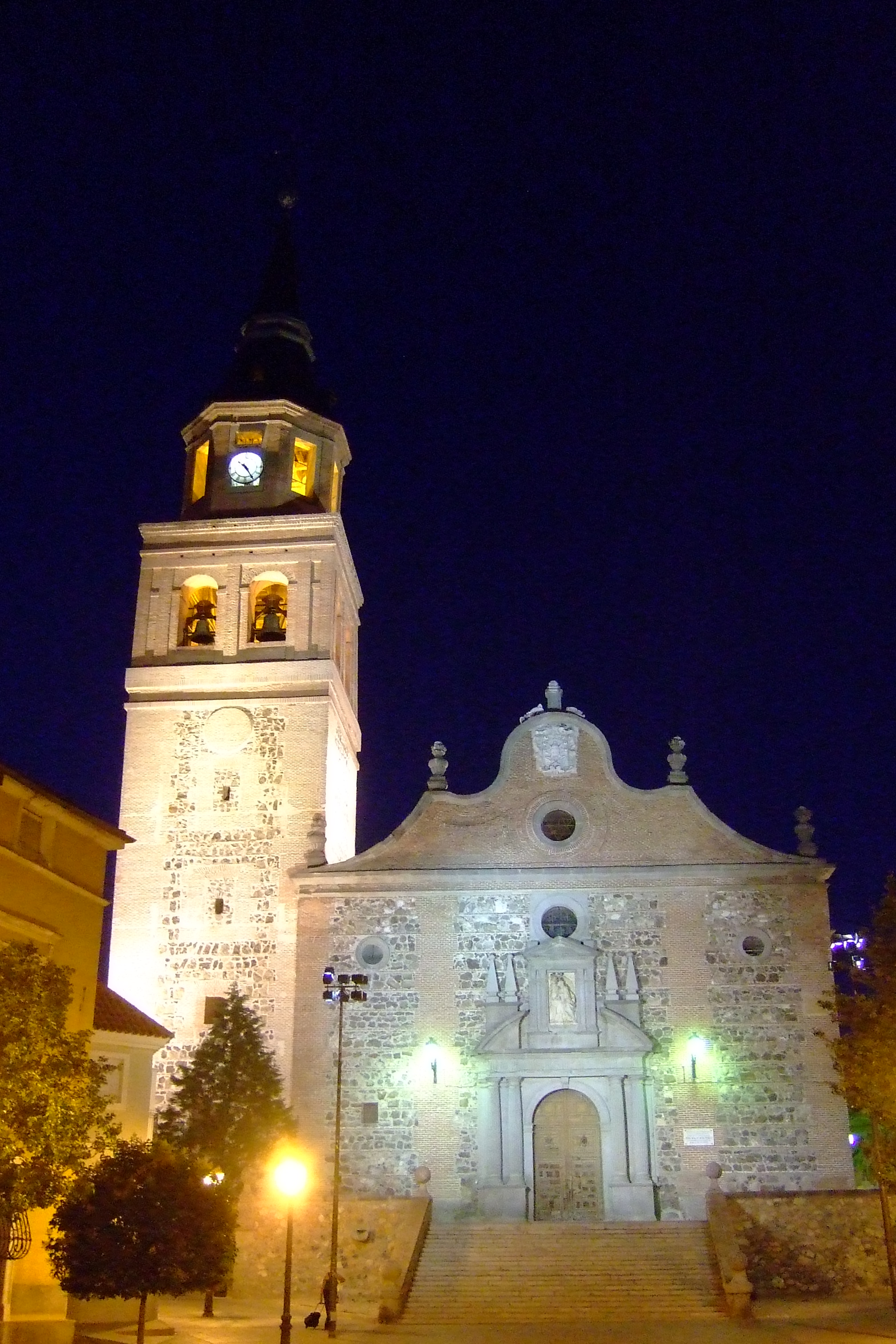

- Location within Spain
- 40.380464°N 3.620179°W
- Location: Madrid, Spain

Spanish Cultural Heritage
- Official name: Iglesia de San Pedro Ad-vincula
- Type: Non-movable
- Criteria: Monument
- Designated: 1995
- Reference no.: RI-51-0009040

The Church of St Peter ad Vincula (Spanish: Iglesia de San Pedro ad Vincula) is a church located in Villa de Vallecas district in Madrid (Spain).

The design of the building is attributed to the well-known architect Juan de Herrera. It was built towards the end of the sixteenth century and replaced an earlier church on the same site.

== Conservation ==
It has been protected by the heritage listing Bien de Interés Cultural since 1995.

== See also ==
- Catholic Church in Spain
- List of oldest church buildings
