= Castle of Buitrago del Lozoya =

Cultural property in Buitrago del Lozoya, Spain

- Castillo de Buitrago del Lozoya (Spanish)
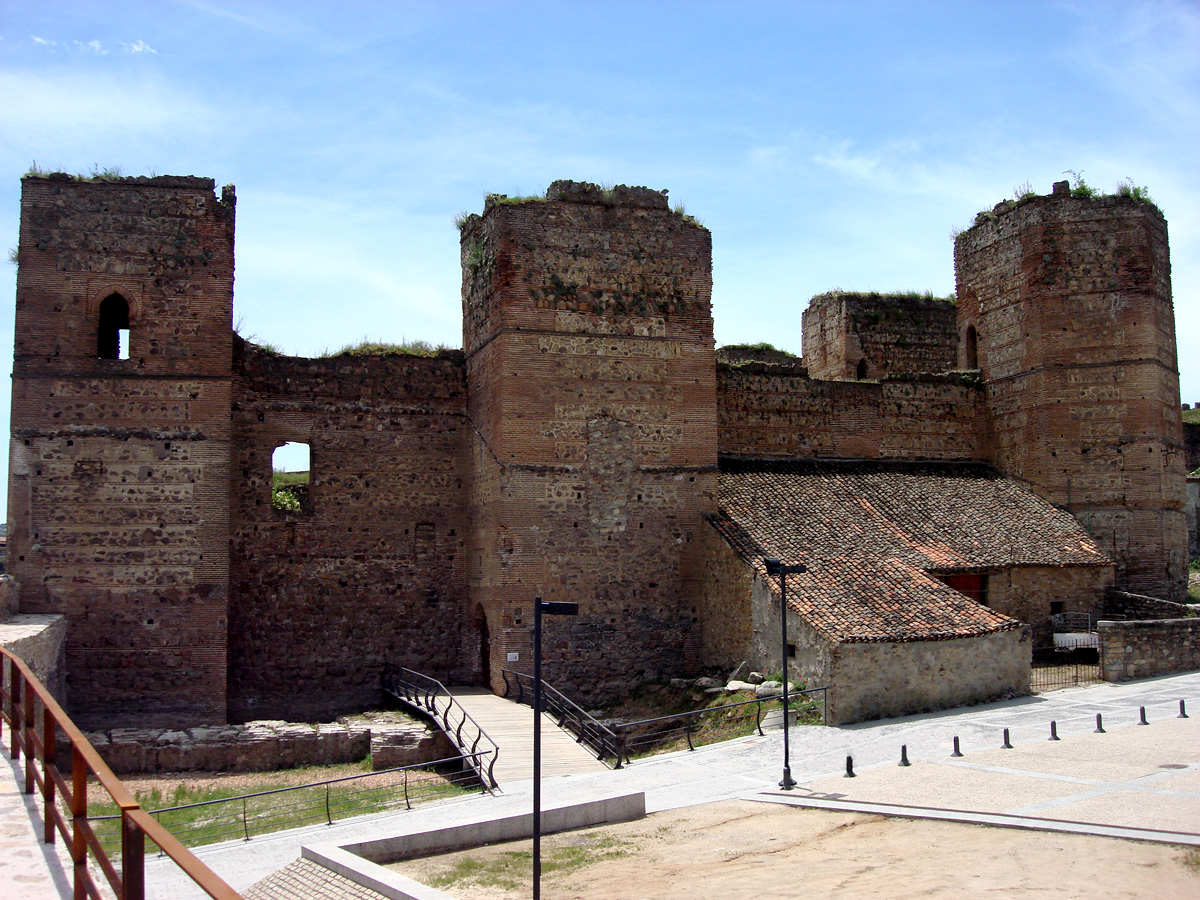

- Location within Spain
- 40.994598°N 3.633976°W
- Location: Buitrago del Lozoya, Spain

Site notes
- Architectural styles: Gothic, Mudéjar

Spanish Cultural Heritage
- Official name: Castillo de Buitrago del Lozoya
- Type: Non-movable
- Criteria: Monument
- Designated: 1931
- Reference no.: RI-51-0000721

The Castle of Buitrago del Lozoya (Spanish: Castillo de Buitrago del Lozoya) is a castle located inside the walls of Buitrago del Lozoya, in the autonomous community of Madrid, Spain.

It was built in the 15th century in Gothic-Mudéjar style. It has a rectangular plan, with seven towers of various shapes (round, pentagonal, square), all in stone. The interior is in ruins.

It was declared a national monument in 1931 and a Bien de Interés Cultural in 1993 as part of the historic quarter of the town.

== See also ==
- List of Bienes de Interés Cultural in Madrid
