= Palace of the Marquis of Molins =

- Palacio del Marqués de Molins (Spanish)
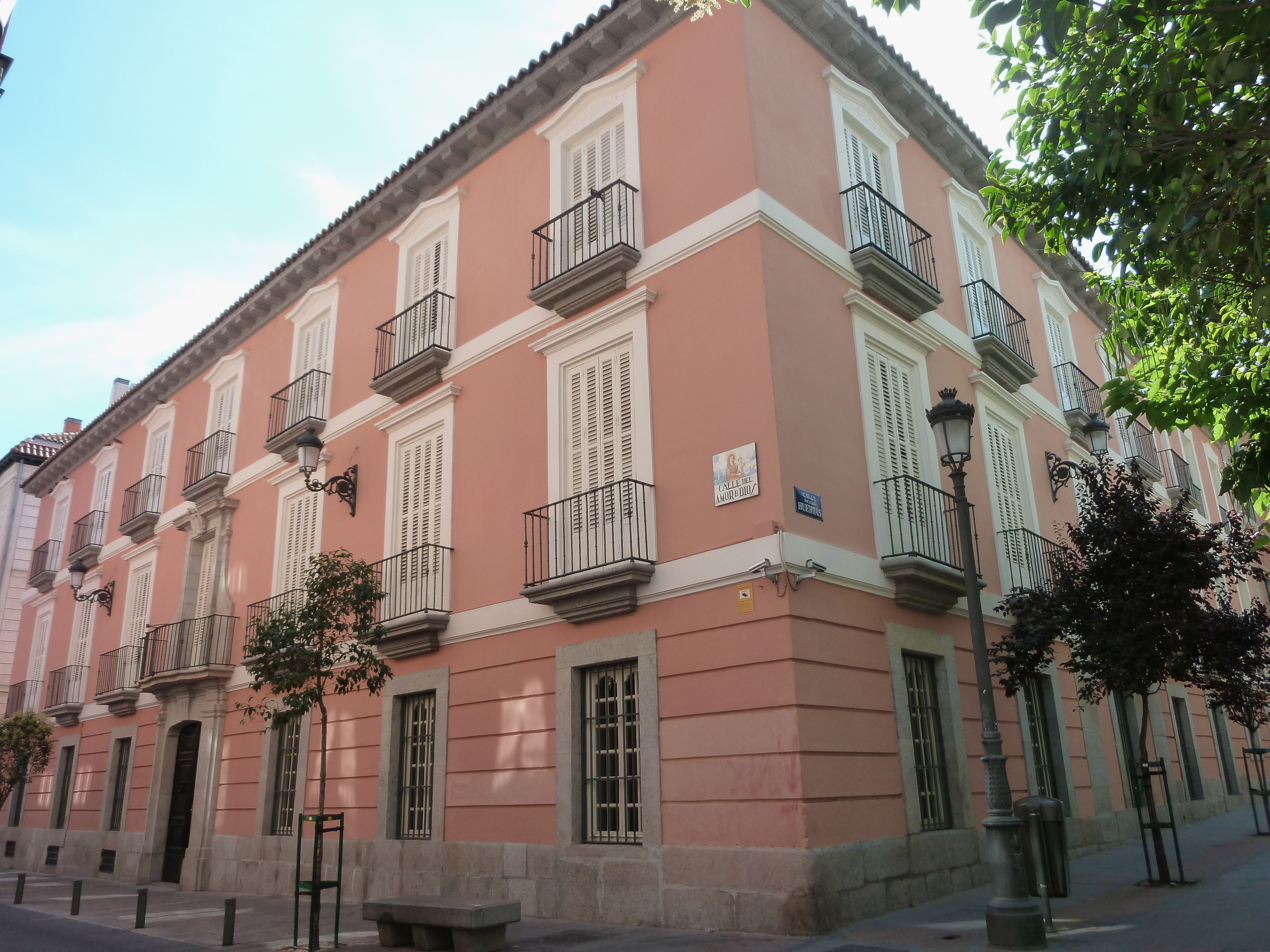

- Location within Spain
- 40.413359°N 3.698289°W
- Location: Madrid, Spain

Spanish Cultural Heritage
- Official name: Palacio del Marqués de Molins
- Type: Non-movable
- Criteria: Monument
- Designated: 2004
- Reference no.: RI-51-0011145

The Palace of the Marquis of Molins (Spanish: Palacio del Marqués de Molins) is a nineteenth-century building in Madrid, Spain. Originally the property of Mariano Roca de Togores y Carrasco, 1st Marquis of Molíns, it now belongs to the state. It was adapted in the 1970s to serve as an annex to the Real Academia de la Historia. The building is protected by a heritage listing, having been declared Bien de Interés Cultural in 2004.
