= Convent of Madres Reparadoras =

- Convento de las Madres Reparadoras (Spanish)
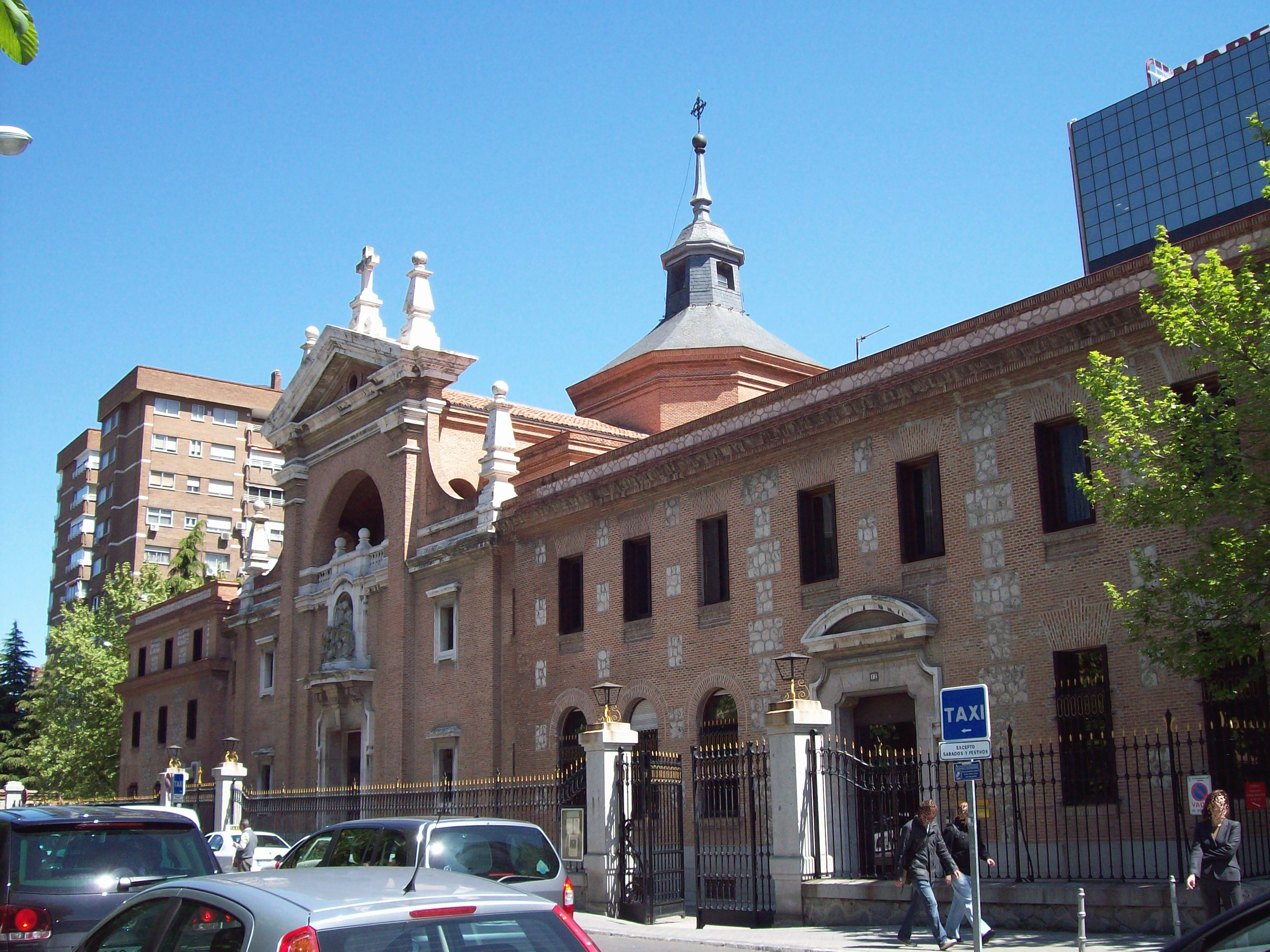

- Location within Spain
- 40.473776°N 3.675738°W
- Location: Madrid, Spain

Spanish Cultural Heritage
- Official name: Convento de las Madres Reparadoras
- Type: Non-movable
- Criteria: Monument
- Designated: 1979
- Reference no.: RI-51-0004306

The Convent of Madres Reparadoras (Spanish: Convento de las Madres Reparadoras) is a convent located in Madrid, Spain. It was declared Bien de Interés Cultural in 1979.
