= Gate of la Latina =

Ancient hospital in Madrid

- Puerta de la Latina (Spanish)
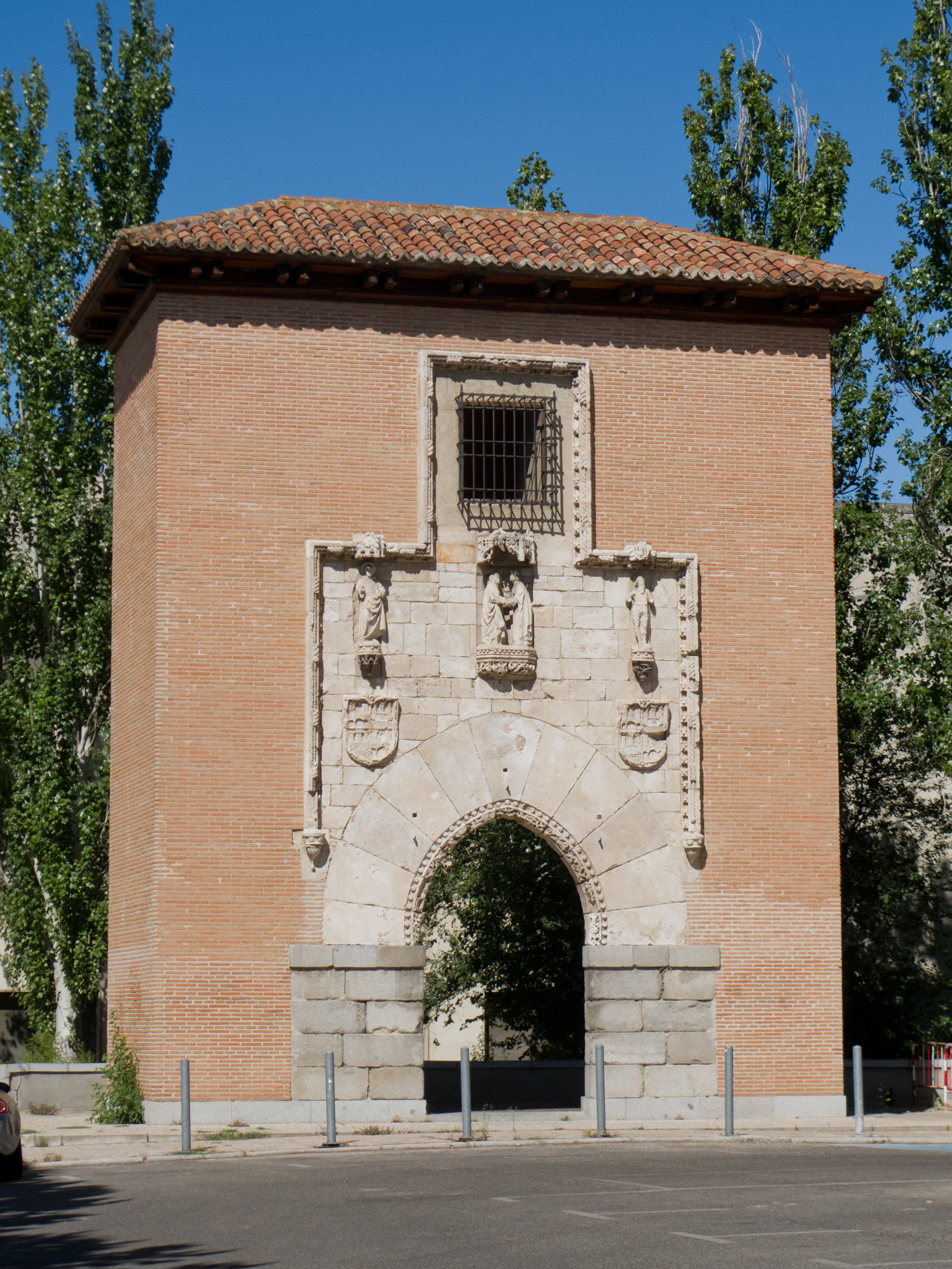

- Location within Spain
- 40.439751°N 3.731549°W
- Location: Madrid, Spain

Spanish Cultural Heritage
- Official name: Puerta de la Latina
- Type: Non-movable
- Criteria: Monument
- Designated: 1984
- Reference no.: RI-51-0005003

The Gate of la Latina (Spanish: Puerta de la Latina) is a gate located in Madrid, Spain. It was declared Bien de Interés Cultural in 1984.
