= Royal Monastery of Santa Isabel =

- Real Monasterio de Santa Isabel (Spanish)
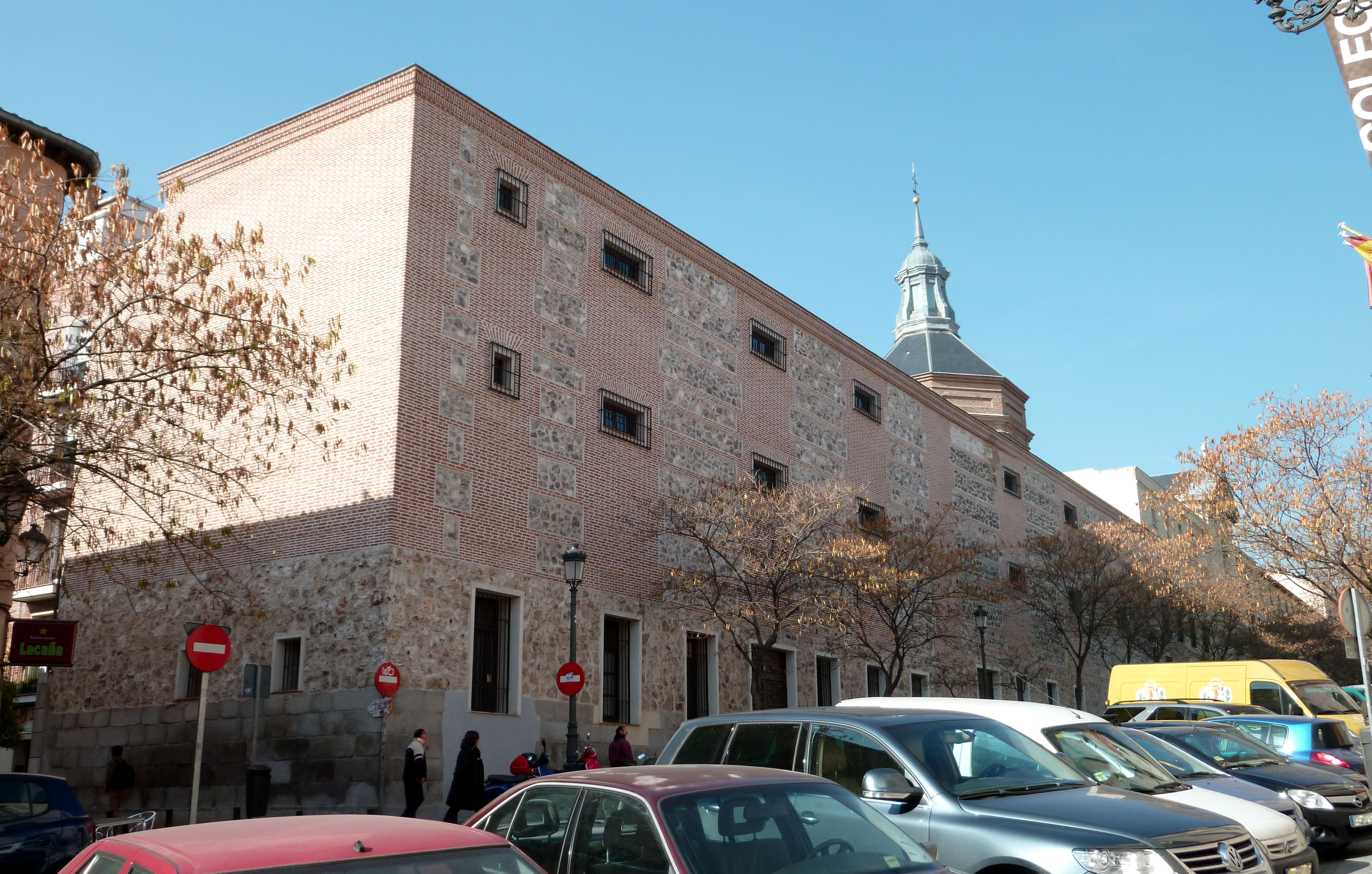

- Location within Spain
- 40.409458°N 3.696257°W
- Location: Madrid, Spain

Spanish Cultural Heritage
- Official name: Real Monasterio de Santa Isabel
- Type: Non-movable
- Criteria: Monument
- Designated: 1995
- Reference no.: RI-51-0009068

The Royal Monastery of Santa Isabel (Spanish: Real Monasterio de Santa Isabel) is a monastery located in Madrid, Spain. In 1946, it was rebuilt due to invasion by French troops that caused destruction of property and art works. In 1995, It was declared Bien de Interés Cultural.
