= La Fuentecilla (Madrid) =

- La Fuentecilla (Spanish)
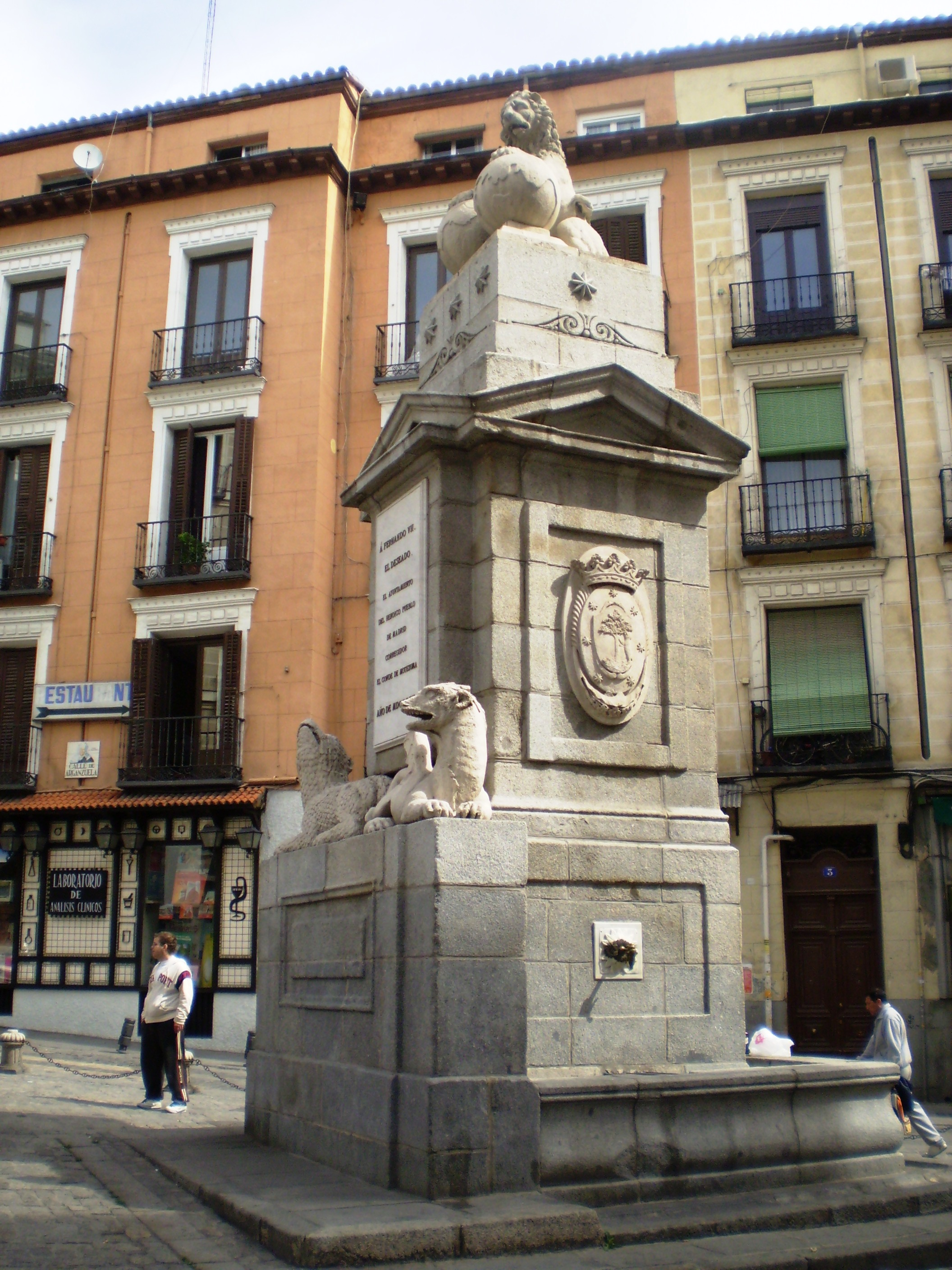

- Location within Spain
- 40.408817°N 3.710311°W
- Location: Madrid, Spain

Spanish Cultural Heritage
- Official name: La Fuentecilla
- Type: Non-movable
- Criteria: Monument
- Designated: 1996
- Reference no.: RI-51-0009273

The La Fuentecilla (Spanish: La Fuentecilla) is a fountain located in Madrid, Spain. It was declared Bien de Interés Cultural in 1996.
