= Fuente el Saz de Jarama =

- Municipality
- Flag Coat of arms

- Municipal location within the Community of Madrid.
- Coordinates: 40°38′10″N 3°30′40″W
- Country: Spain
- Autonomous community: Community of Madrid

Population (2025-01-01)
  - Total: 7,413
- Time zone: UTC+1 (CET)
  - Summer (DST): UTC+2 (CEST)

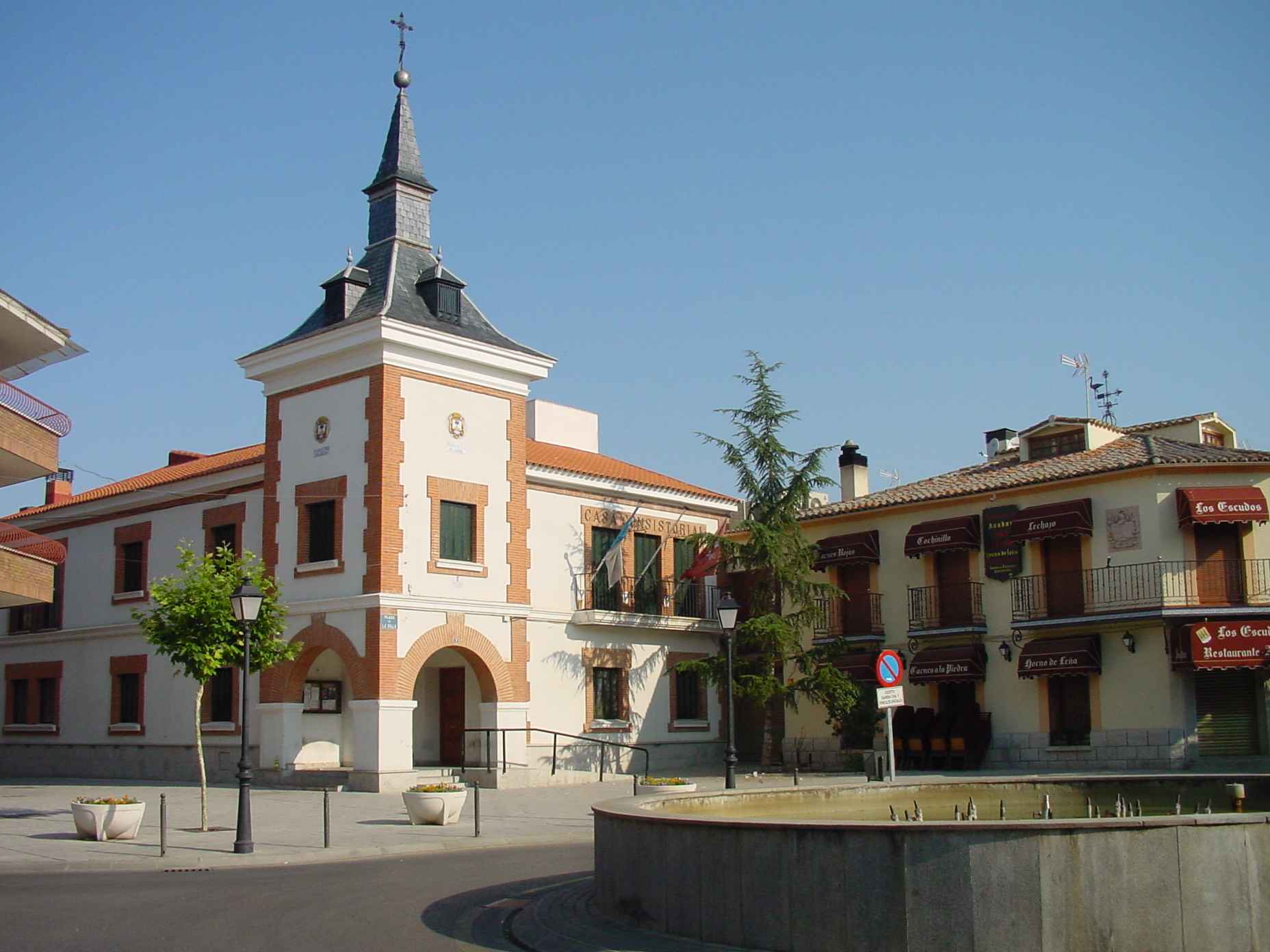
City Hall

Fuente el Saz de Jarama is a municipality of the autonomous community of Madrid in central Spain. It belongs to the comarca of Cuenca del Medio Jarama.

== Bus lines ==
- Line 184: Madrid (Plaza de Castilla) - El Casar (Interbús)
- Line 197: Madrid (Plaza de Castilla) - Torrelaguna (ALSA)
- Line 254: Valdeolmos/Fuente el Saz - Alcalá de Henares (ALSA)
