= Church of Santa Teresa y San José =

- Iglesia Parroquial de Santa Teresa y San José (Spanish)
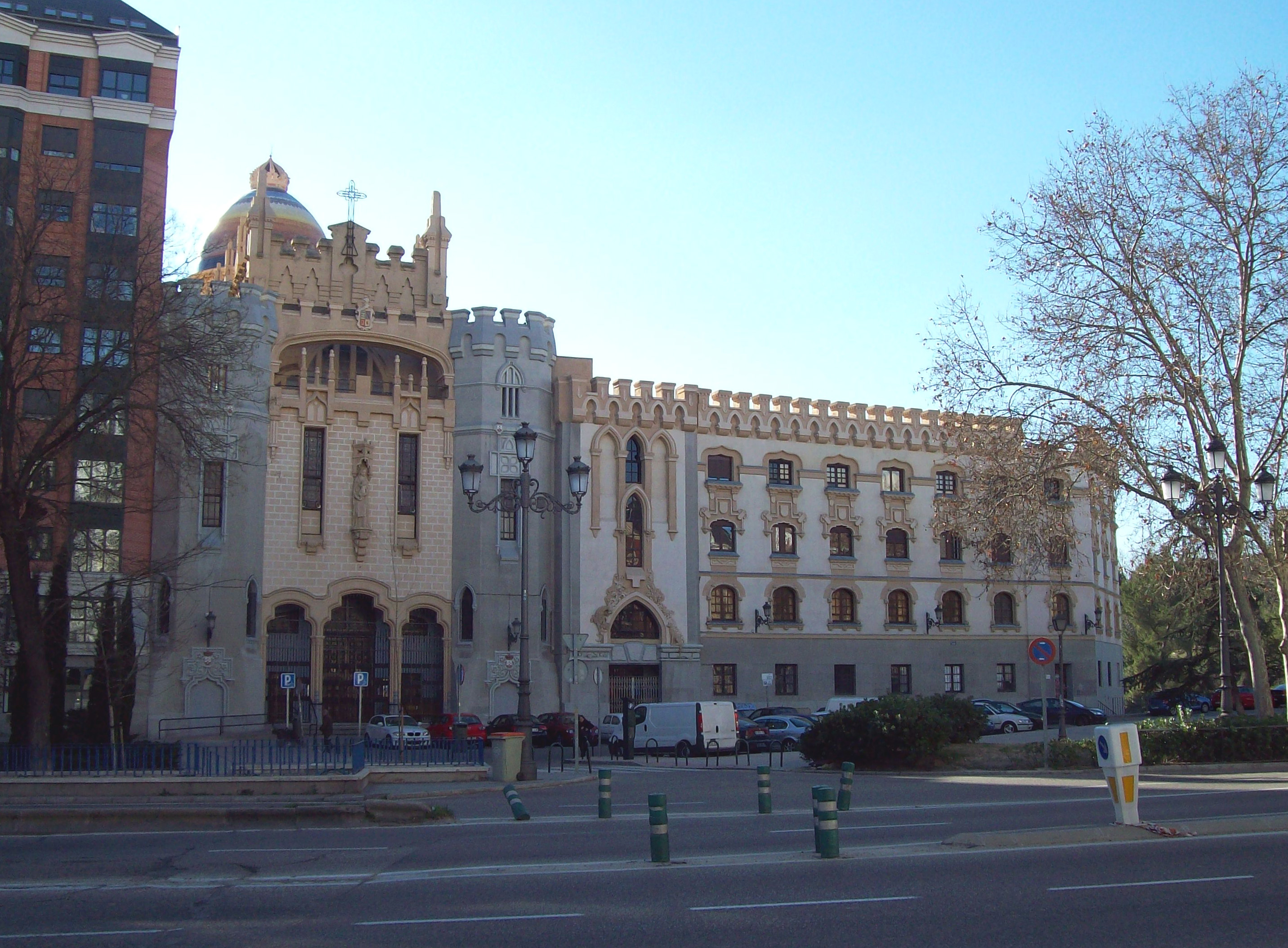

- Location within Spain
- 40.422356°N 3.714914°W
- Location: Madrid, Spain

Spanish Cultural Heritage
- Official name: Iglesia Parroquial de Santa Teresa y San José
- Type: Non-movable
- Criteria: Monument
- Designated: 1995
- Reference no.: RI-51-0009258

The Parish Church of Santa Teresa y San José (Spanish: Iglesia Parroquial de Santa Teresa y San José), also known as the National Temple of Santa Teresa de Jesús and Convent of the Discalced Carmelite Fathers (Templo Nacional de Santa Teresa de Jesús y Convento de los Padres Carmelitas Descalzos), is a Catholic church located in Madrid, Spain. The complex serves as a religious community residence, a nursing home and a parish church. It was declared Bien de Interés Cultural in 1995.

== History ==
Built for the Discalced Carmelites in Madrid, who had been occupying a temporary chapel since 1876, the foundation stone was laid on 28 April 1916 in the Plaza de España. The work of architect Jesús Carrasco-Muñoz, the building was completed in 1928 in a mixture of Gothic and Byzantine styles. Severely damaged during the Burning of the Convents in 1931, it was restored at the end of the Spanish Civil War.

== Description ==
The façade of complex resembles a crenellated medieval fortress with a statue of Saint Teresa of Ávila above the main gate; however the large cruciform church building behind this has three naves and is noted for its light interior. In the side chapels are two large oil paintings by Francisco Cossio depicting the "Apotheosis of Saint Teresa" and the "Apotheosis of the Order". The prominent dome of the church is covered in multicoloured mosaic tiles.

== Image gallery ==
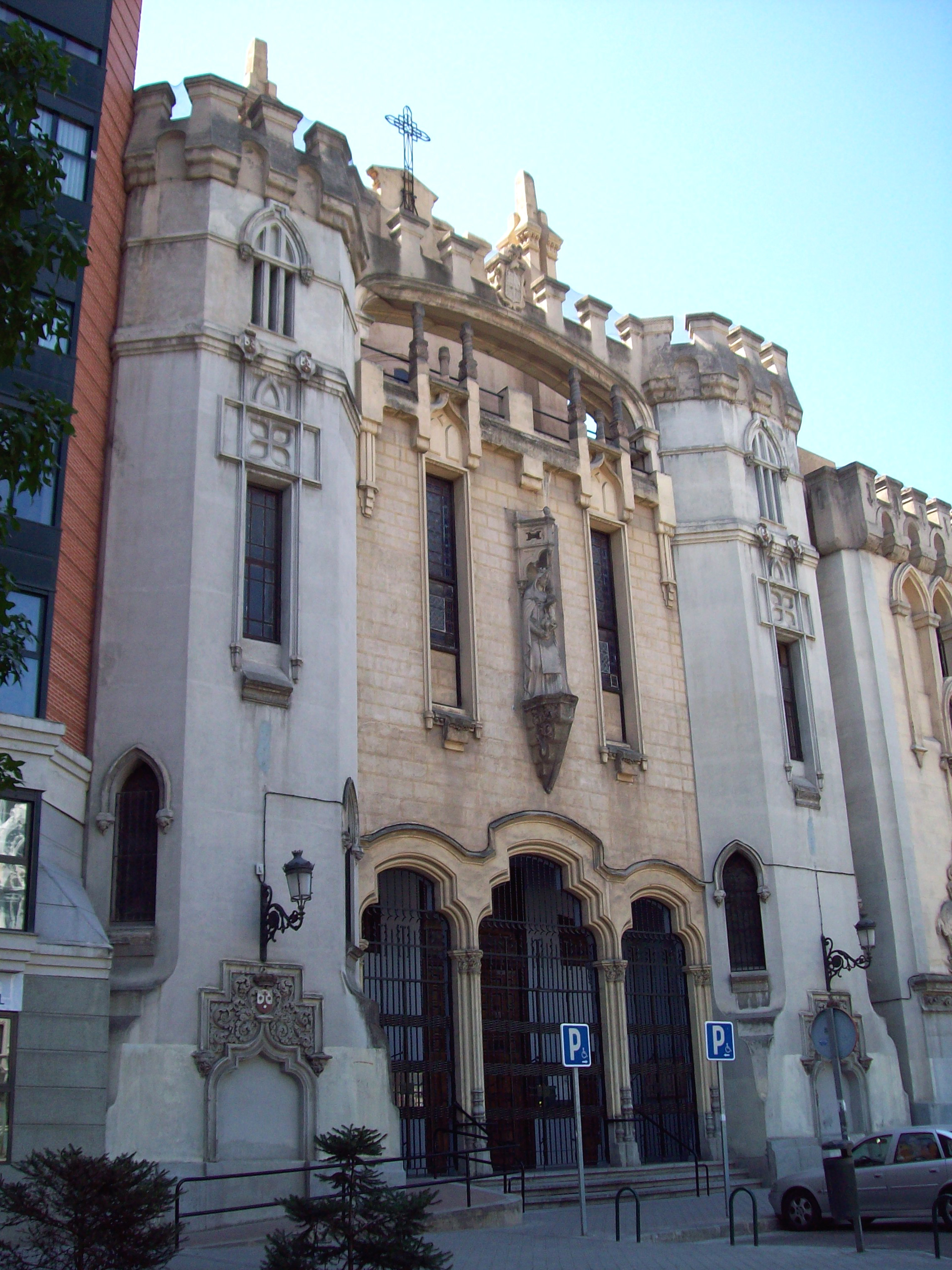
Iglesia de Santa Teresa y San José, the main gate in the façade of the complex.

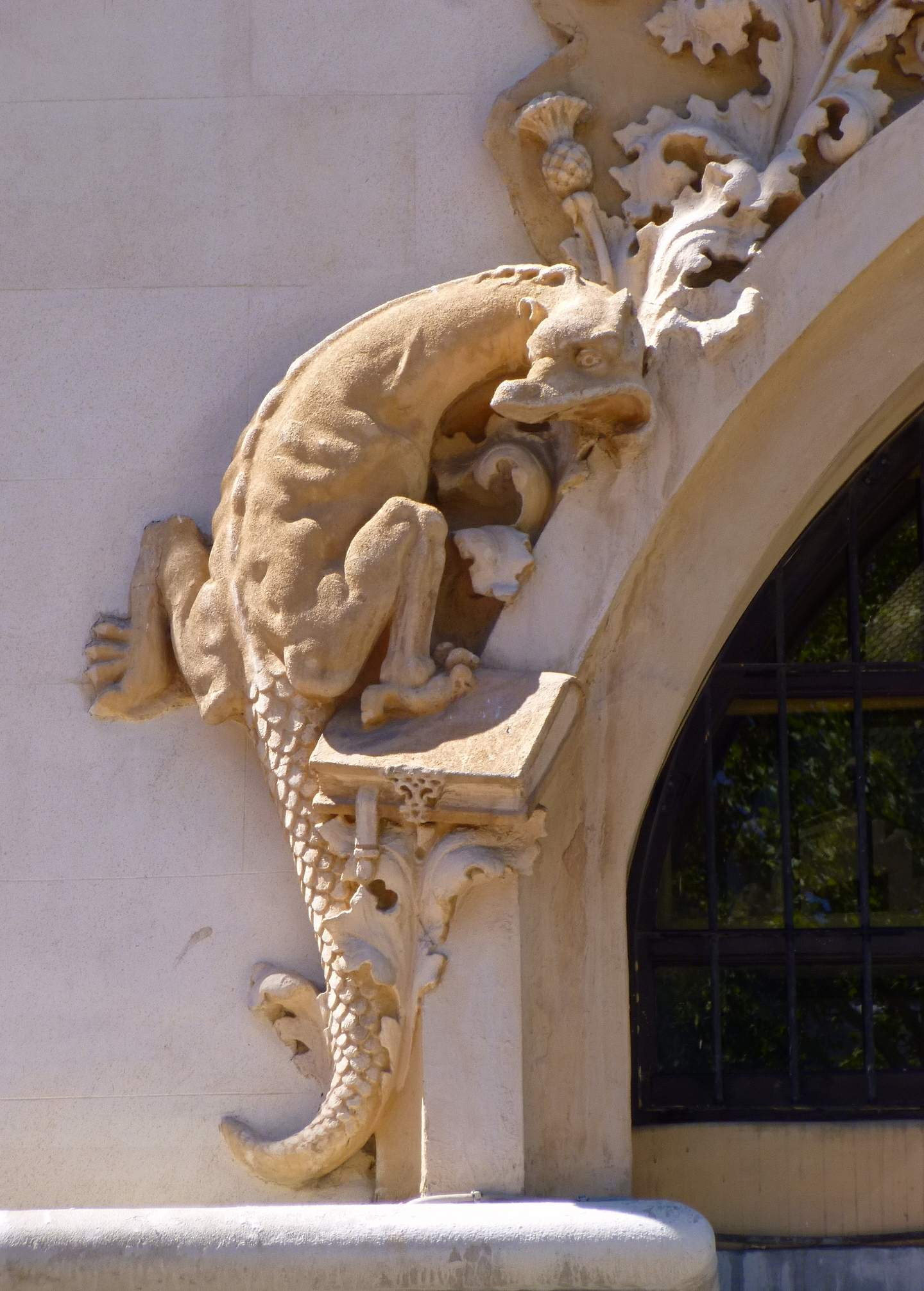
A heraldic beast in the façade.

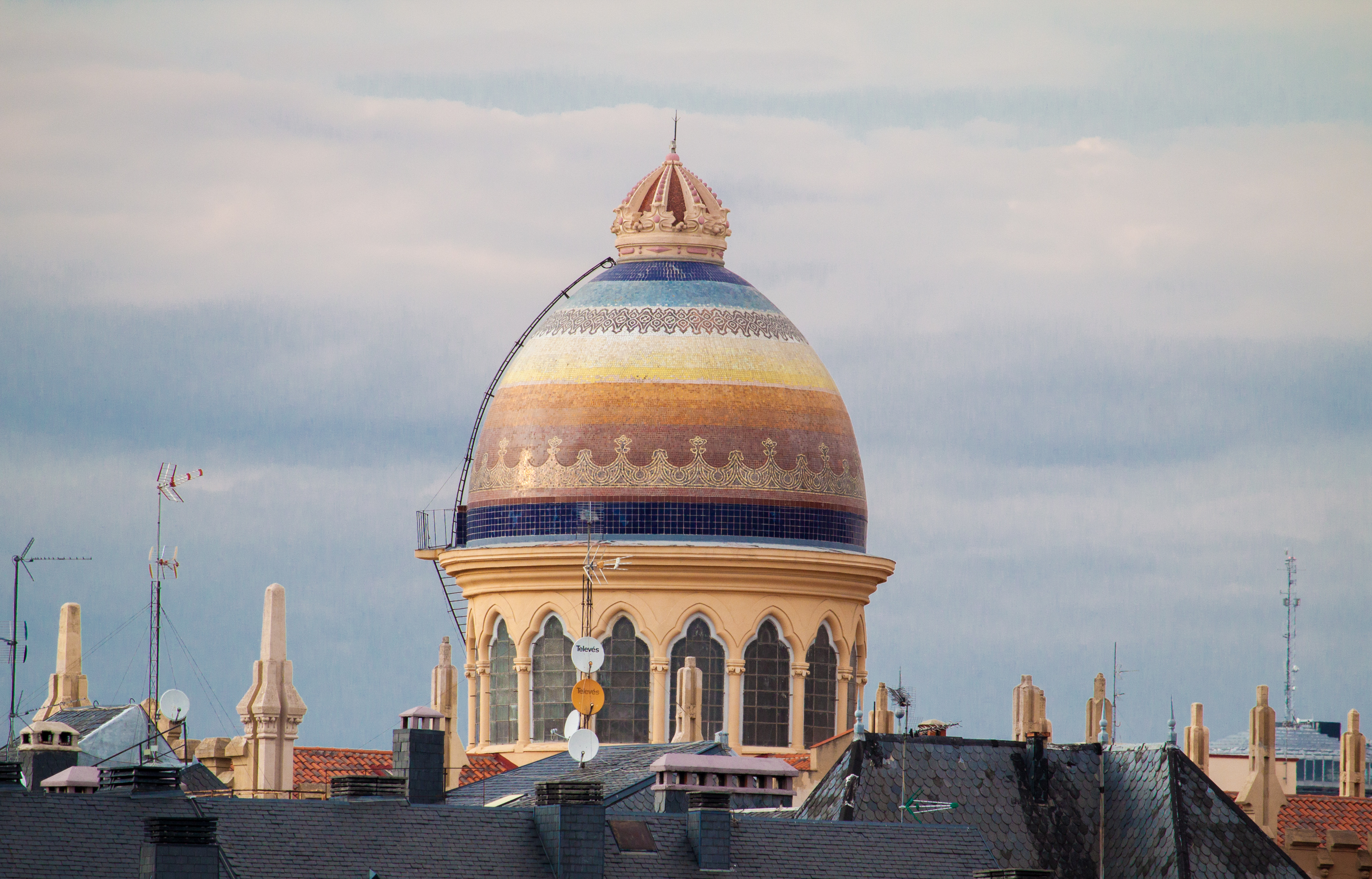
Dome of Iglesia de Santa Teresa y San José, seen from Calle Bailén near Jardines de Sabatini.

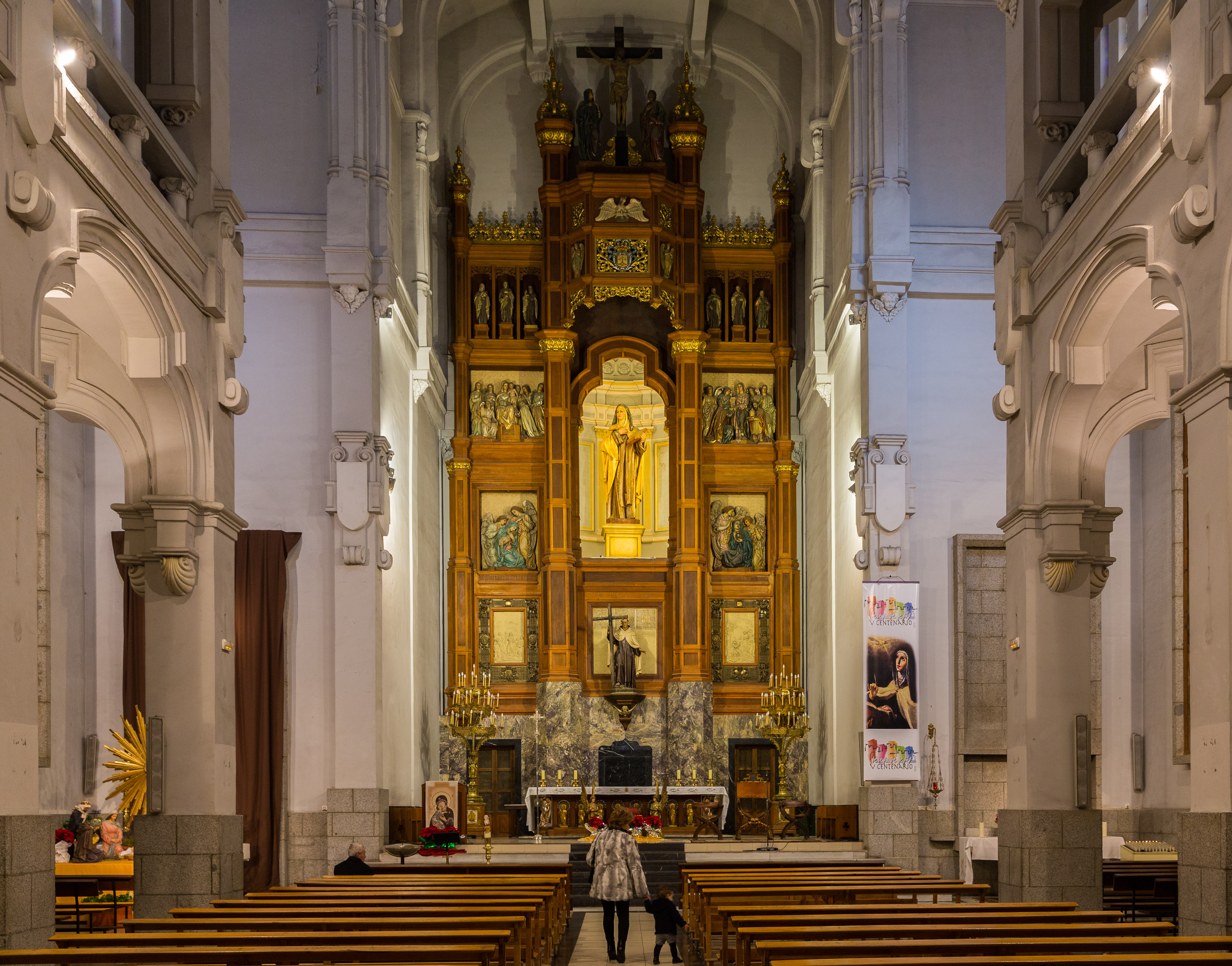
Iglesia de Santa Teresa y San José, the High Altar.

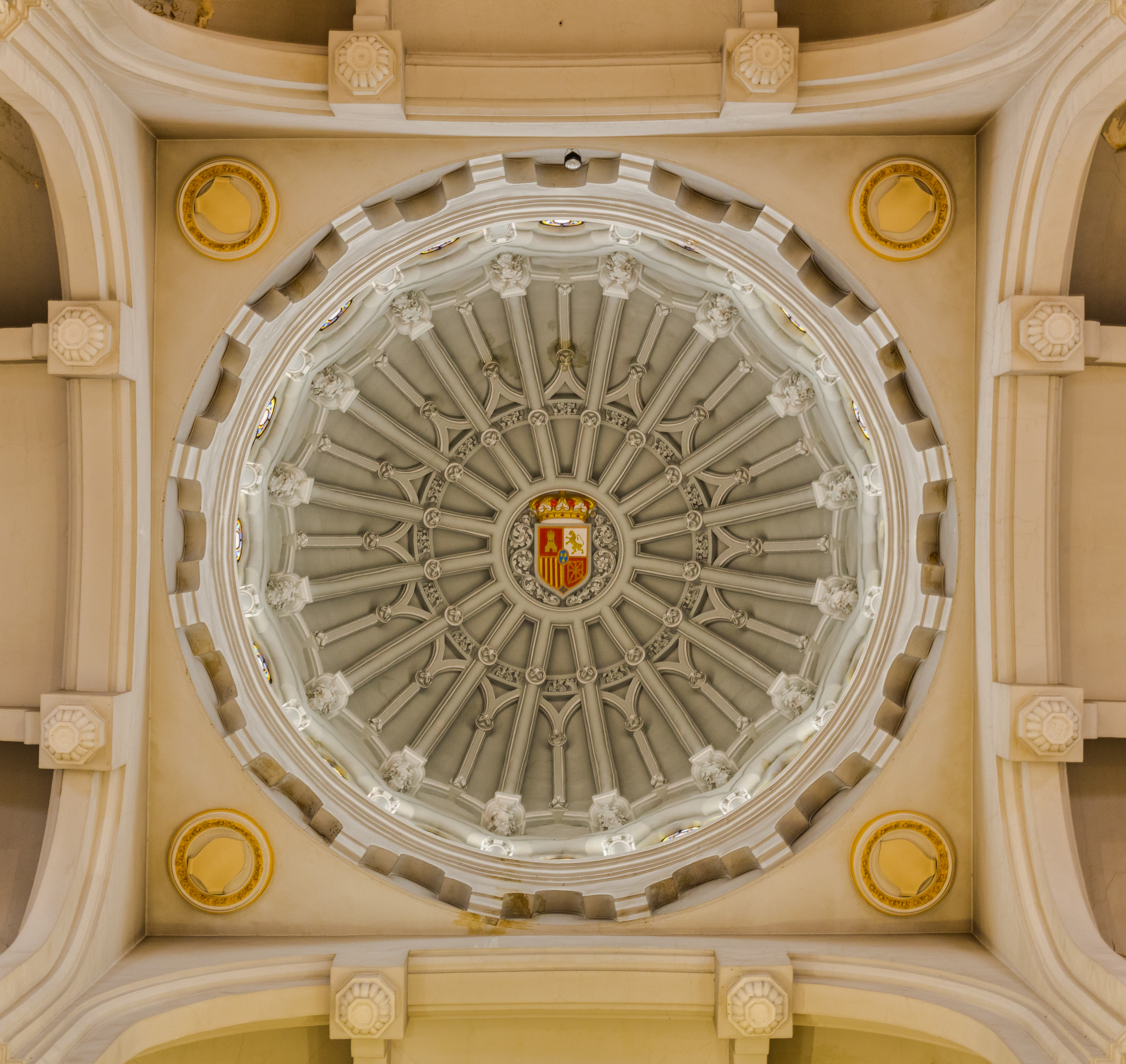
Iglesia de Santa Teresa y San José, interior of the dome.

== See also ==
- Catholic Church in Spain
- List of oldest church buildings
