= Hermitage of Santa María la Antigua (Madrid) =

- Ermita de Santa María la Antigua (Spanish)
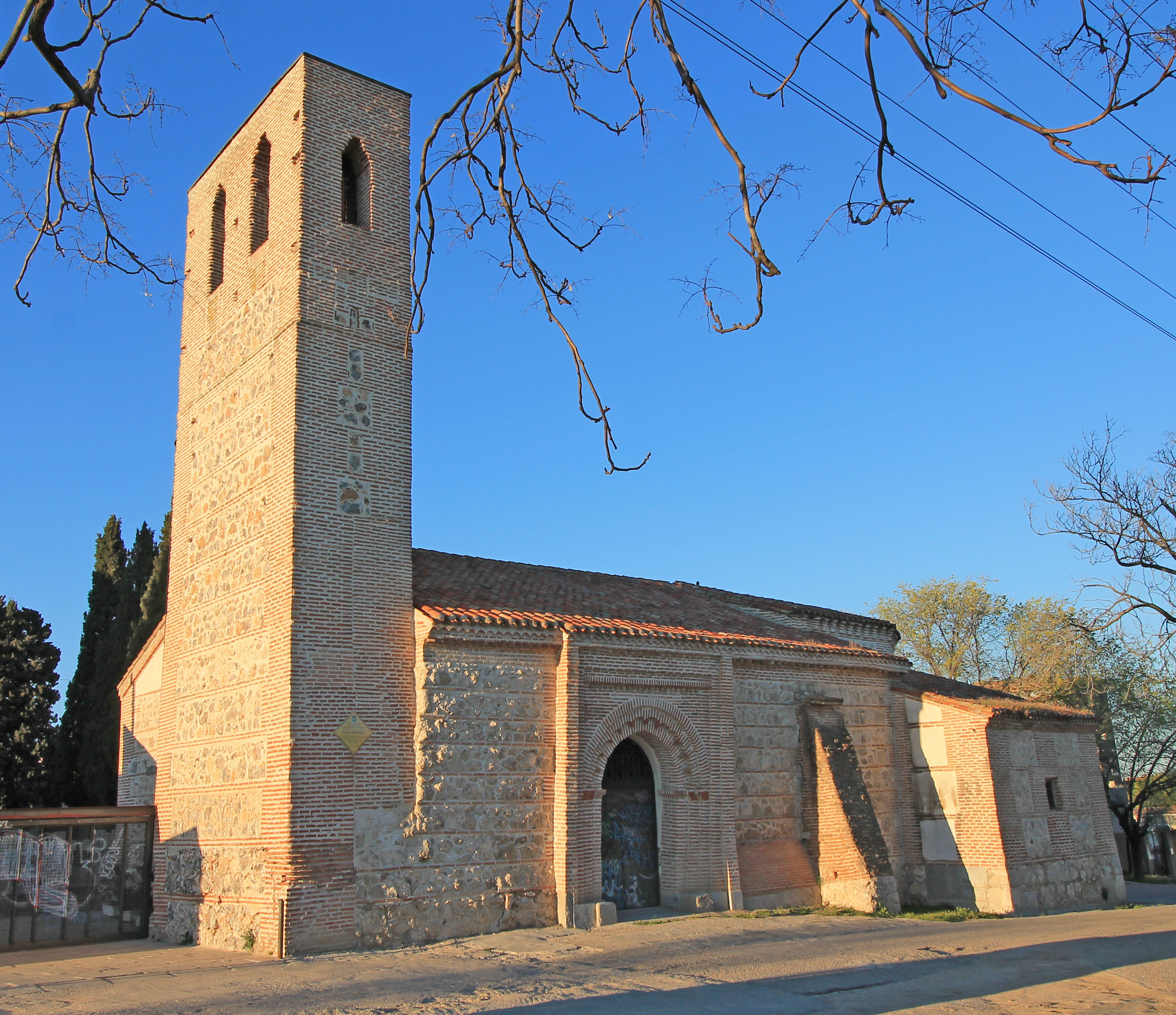

- Location within Spain
- 40.38243°N 3.752625°W
- Location: Madrid, Spain

Spanish Cultural Heritage
- Official name: Ermita de Santa María la Antigua
- Type: Non-movable
- Criteria: Monument
- Designated: 1981
- Reference no.: RI-51-0004522

The Hermitage of Santa María la Antigua (Spanish: Ermita de Santa María la Antigua) is a hermitage located in Madrid, Spain. It was declared Bien de Interés Cultural in 1981.
