= House of Sombrerete =

- Corrala de Sombrerete (Spanish)
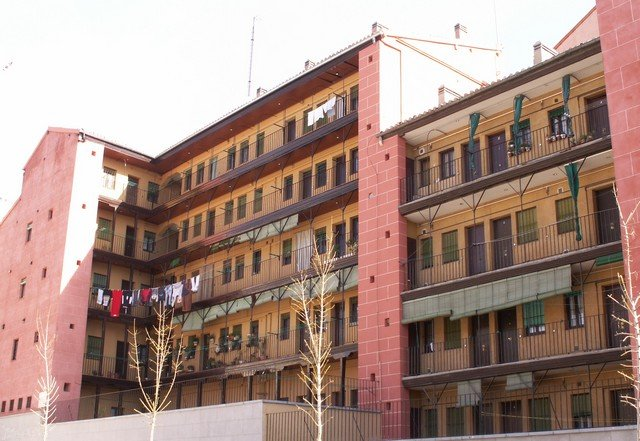

- Location within Spain
- 40.408032°N 3.702517°W
- Location: Madrid, Spain

Spanish Cultural Heritage
- Official name: Corrala de Sombrerete
- Type: Non-movable
- Criteria: Monument
- Designated: 1978
- Reference no.: RI-51-0005021

The House of Sombrerete (Spanish: Corrala de Sombrerete) is a building located in Madrid, Spain. It was declared a national monument in 1977 and later confirmed as a Bien de Interés Cultural, a cultural property of Spain.

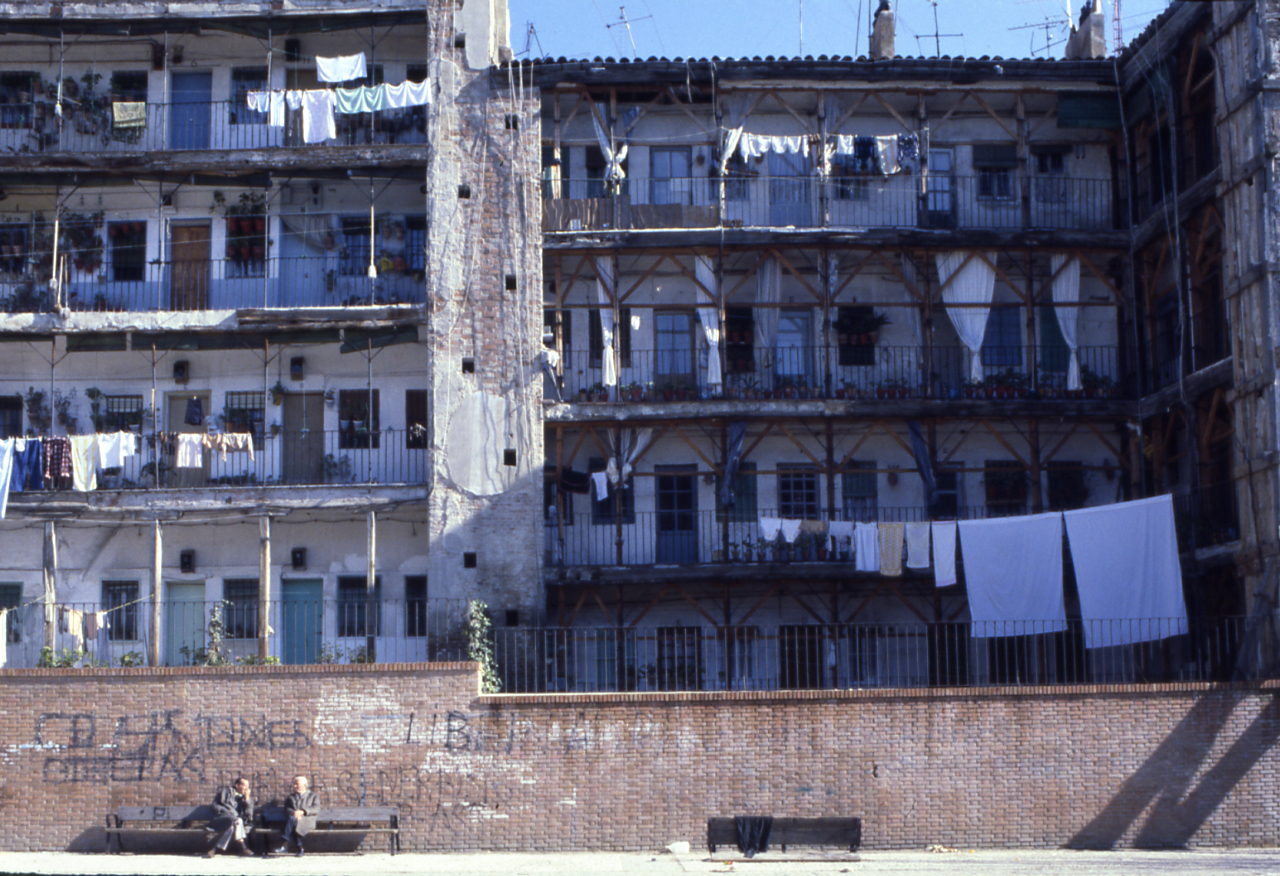
View of the building, photographed in about 1980. Photo by Paolo Monti.
