= Church of el Carmen (Madrid) =

Cultural property in Madrid, Spain

- Iglesia del Carmen (Spanish)
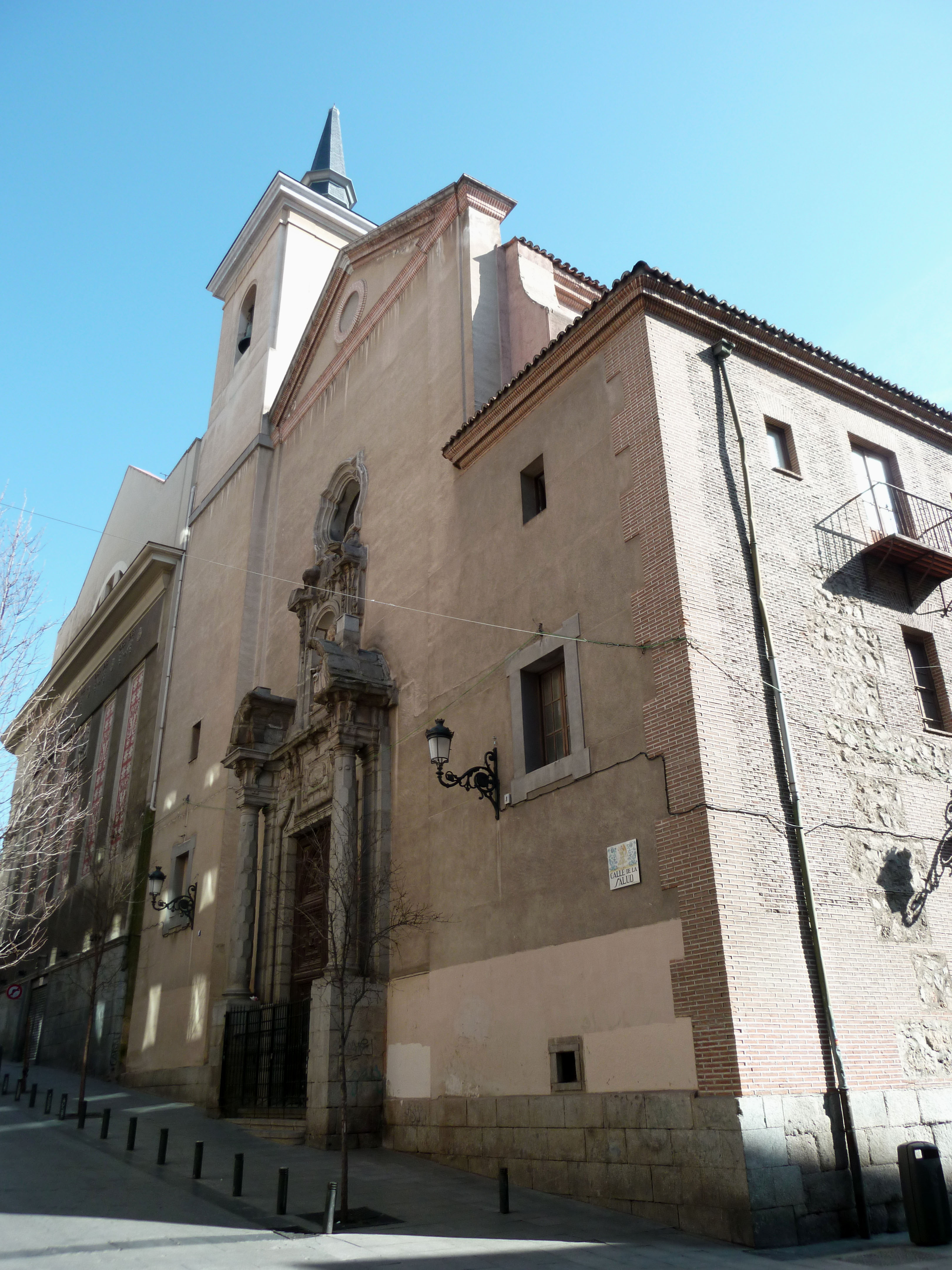

- Location within Spain
- 40.418244°N 3.704045°W
- Location: Madrid, Spain

Spanish Cultural Heritage
- Official name: Iglesia del Carmen
- Type: Non-movable
- Criteria: Monument
- Designated: 1983
- Reference no.: RI-51-0004812

The Church of el Carmen (Spanish: Iglesia del Carmen) is a church located in Madrid, Spain. It was declared Bien de Interés Cultural in 1983. It was formerly part of the Convento del Carmen Calzado complex.

== See also ==
- Catholic Church in Spain
- List of oldest church buildings
