= International Institute (Madrid) =

- Instituto Internacional (Spanish)
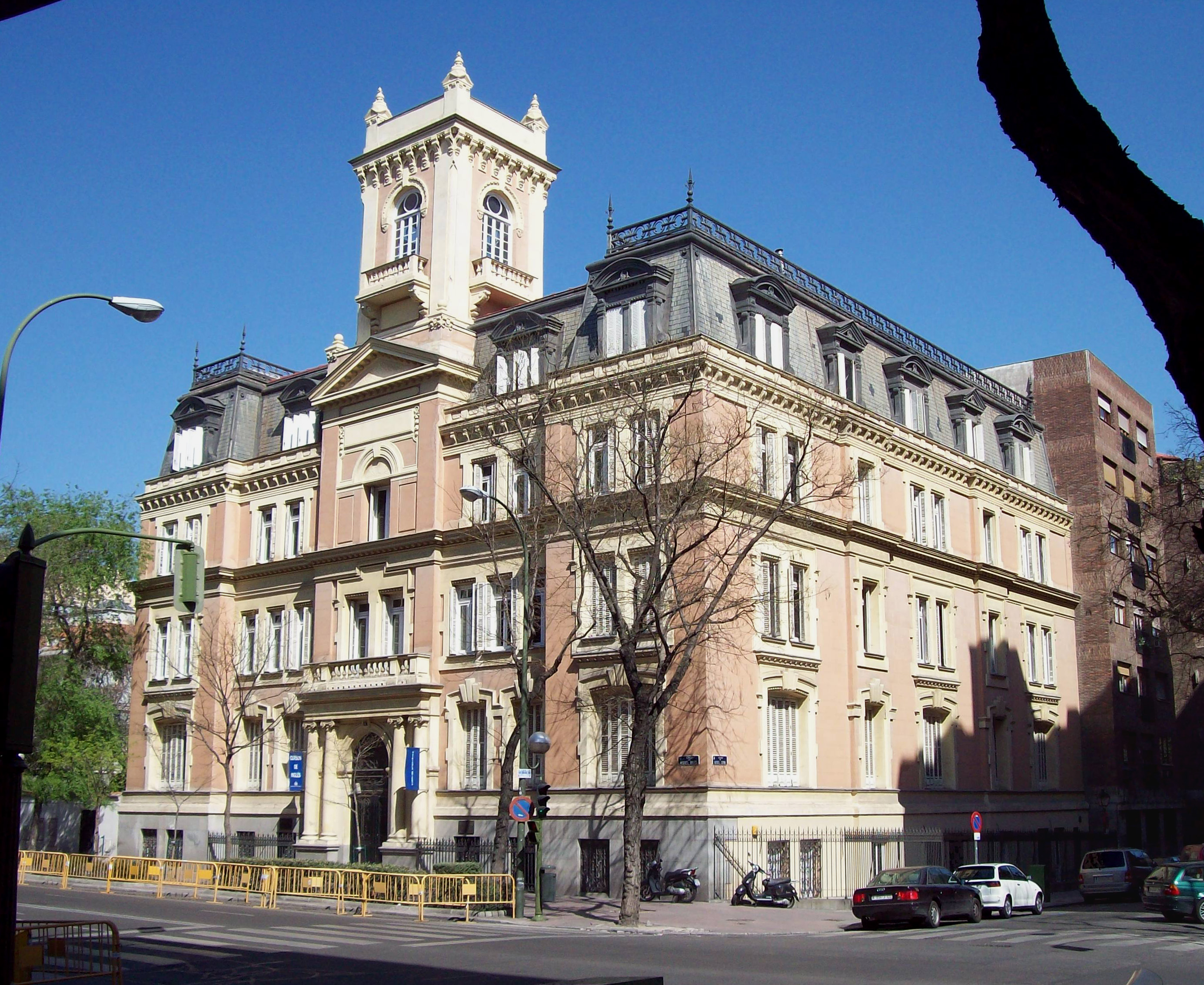

- Location within Spain
- 40.434314°N 3.691058°W
- Location: Madrid, Spain

Spanish Cultural Heritage
- Official name: Instituto Internacional
- Type: Non-movable
- Criteria: Monument
- Designated: 1982
- Reference no.: RI-51-0004540

The International Institute (Spanish: Instituto Internacional) is a building located in Madrid, Spain. It was declared Bien de Interés Cultural in 1982.

Building was projected in 1906 by architect Joaquín Saldaña López and built between 1906 and 1911. Until 2002 it housed a school.
