= La Cabrera =

Coordinates: 40.8667°N 3.6°W

- Municipality
- Flag Coat of arms

- Municipal location within the Community of Madrid.
- Country: Spain
- Autonomous community: Community of Madrid

Area
  - Total: 8.65 sq mi (22.40 km^{2})
- Elevation: 3,366 ft (1,026 m)

Population (2025-01-01)
  - Total: 2,889
  - Density: 334.0/sq mi (129.0/km^{2})
- Time zone: UTC+1 (CET)
  - Summer (DST): UTC+2 (CEST)

La Cabrera (Spanish: [la kaˈβɾeɾa]) is a municipality in central Spain, around 56 km (35 mi) away from Madrid. La Cabrera belongs to the comarca called Sierra Norte de Madrid which is part of the wider autonomous Community of Madrid.

Covering an area of 22.40 km^{2} (8.65 sq mi), it is bordered to the north by Lozoyuela-Navas-Sieteiglesias, to the east by El Berrueco, to the south by Cabanillas de la Sierra and Torrelaguna, and to the east by Valdemanco.

European route E-05 runs through the town, following the old N-I radial road connecting Madrid to Irun and France (later split into the A-1).

La Cabrera is characterised by its mountainous topography with the prominent La Cabrera mountain range forming a natural limit to the North. The town is situated in the easternmost part of the range at about 1,038 m (3,406 ft) above sea level. Although most of the mountain range is in La Cabrera, it also reaches the neighbouring municipalities of Valdemanco and Lozoyuela.

The landscape is formed by a granite massif of Palaeozoic origin. Its main features include the summits of Cancho Gordo (1,564 m [5,131 ft]), Pico del Miel (1,392 m [4,567 ft]) and Cerro de La Cabeza (1,247 m [4,091 ft]), as well as natural springs and streams, including the Alfrecho stream which feeds the Jarama River.

Among its flora are the trees and thickets of the southern slopes, such as: Pyrenean Oak, Holm Oak, Poplar, Willow, and Pink Rockrose.

== Buses ==
- 191: Buitrago - Madrid (Plaza de Castilla)
- 193: El Vellón - Pedrezuela - Madrid (Plaza de Castilla)
- 194: Rascafría - Madrid (Plaza de Castilla)
- 195: Braojos - Madrid (Plaza de Castilla)
- 196: La Acebeda - Madrid (Plaza de Castilla) (only at weekends)
- 197B: Torrelaguna - El Berrueco - La Cabrera - Valdemanco
- 197C: Torrelaguna - Venturada - Cabanillas
- 725: Valdemanco - Bustarviejo - Miraflores - Madrid (Plaza de Castilla) (2 daily trips)
