= San Sebastián de los Reyes =

Municipality of Spain

- Municipality
- Flag Coat of arms
- Nicknames: Sanse, Pamplona chica
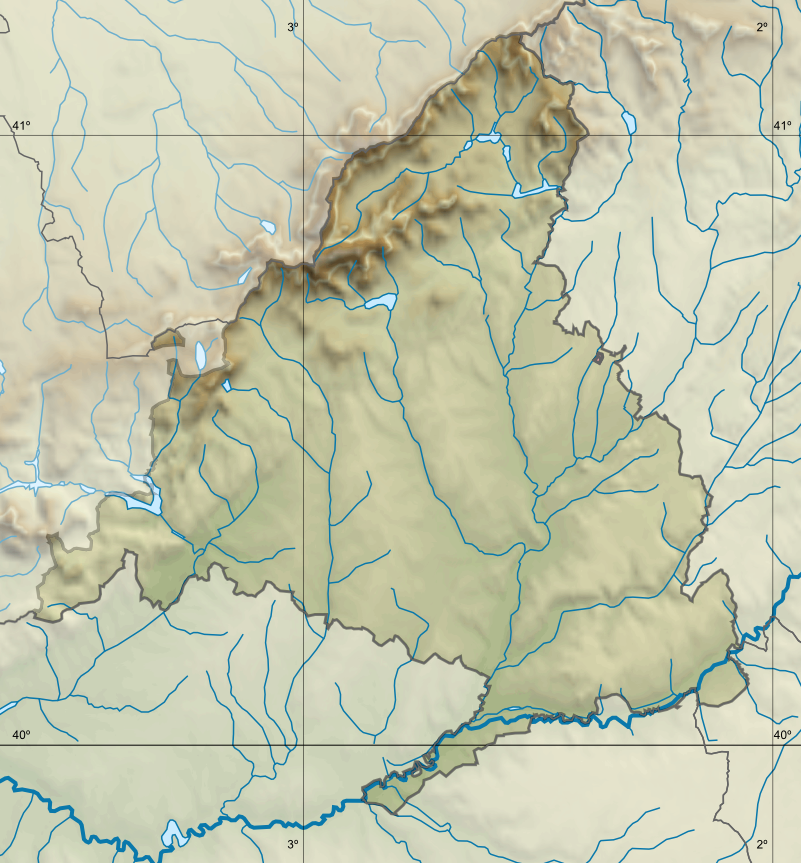
- Location within Spain Location within Community of Madrid
- Coordinates: 40°32′49″N 3°37′33″W
- Country: Spain
- Region: Community of Madrid
- Founded: 1492

Government
  - Type: ayuntamiento
  - Mayor: Lucia Soledad Fernandez Alonso (PP)

Area
  - Total: 59.26 km^{2} (22.88 sq mi)
  - Land: 59.26 km^{2} (22.88 sq mi)
- Elevation: 730 m (2,400 ft)

Population (2022)
  - Total: 91,083
  - Density: 1,537/km^{2} (3,981/sq mi)
- Time zone: CET (GMT +1)
  - Summer (DST): CEST (GMT +2)
- Post code: 28701-28703, 28706-28709
- Area code: +34 91
- Website: http://www.ssreyes.org/

San Sebastián de los Reyes (Spanish: [san seβasˈtjan de los ˈreʝes], colloquially called "Sanse") is a municipality in the Community of Madrid, Spain. Founded in 1492, it is located 20 kilometres (12 mi) north of Madrid.

== Geography ==
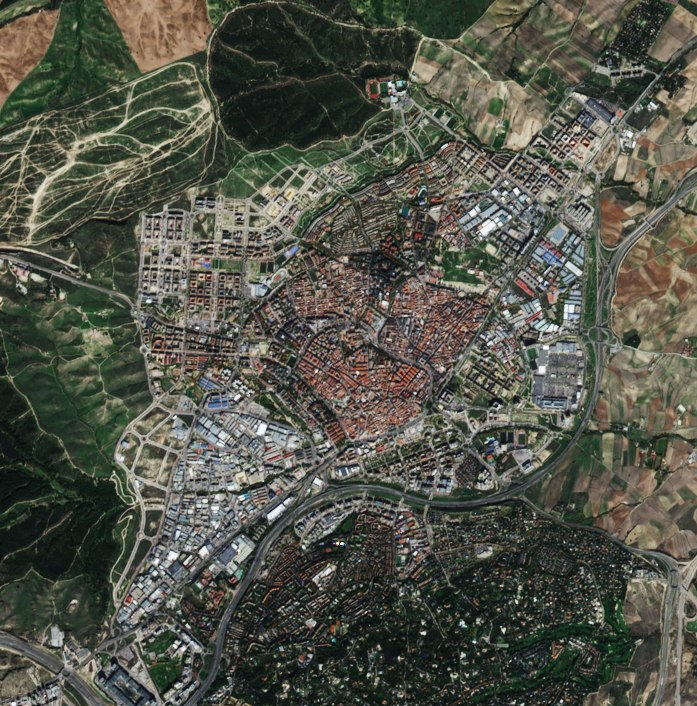
The urban continuum of Alcobendas and San Sebastián de los Reyes as seen by the European Space Agency's Sentinel-2.

It forms an urban continuum with the neighbouring Alcobendas,

== Transport ==
San Sebastián de los Reyes, having direct communication with the A-1 motorway, has a connection with several bus lines that connect the city with Madrid and several towns in the Sierra Norte of Madrid. This line buses, along with urban ones, are the following:

- Urban line 2: Alcobendas - La Moraleja (by Paseo de Alcobendas) (Interbús)
- Urban line 4: Sports Center - Moscatelares (Interbús)
- Urban line 5: San Sebastián de los Reyes - Alcobendas - El Soto de la Moraleja (Interbús)
- Urban line 7: Alcobendas train station - Polígonos - Alcobendas train station (Interbús)
- Urban line 8: Alcobendas (train station) - Alcobendas (Arroyo de la Vega) (Interbús)
- 151: Madrid (Plaza de Castilla) - Alcobendas (Interbús)
- 152C: Madrid (Plaza de Castilla) - San Sebastián de los Reyes (Dehesa Vieja) (Interbús)
- 153: Madrid (Plaza de Castilla) - Alcobendas - Rosa Luxemburgo (Interbús)
- 154: Madrid (Chamartín) - San Sebastián de los Reyes (circular by Fuencarral) (Interbús)
- 154C: Madrid (Plaza de Castilla) - San Sebastián de los Reyes (Quiñones Avenue) (Interbús)
- 156: Madrid (Plaza de Castilla) - San Sebastián de los Reyes (Polígono Industrial Moscatelares) (Interbús)
- 158: Madrid (Pinar de Chamartín) - Alcobendas-San Sebastián de los Reyes (Tempranales) (Interbús)
- 161: Madrid (Plaza de Castilla) - Fuente del Fresno urbanization (Interbús)
- 166: San Sebastián de los Reyes-Urbanización Valdelagua (Interbús)
- 180: Alcobendas - Algete (Interbús)
- 171: Madrid (Plaza de Castilla) - Santo Domingo urbanization (ALSA)
- 191: Madrid (Plaza de Castilla) - Buitrago del Lozoya (ALSA)
- 193: Madrid (Plaza de Castilla) - El Vellón (ALSA)
- 194: Madrid (Plaza de Castilla) - Rascafría (ALSA)
- 195: Madrid (Plaza de Castilla) - Braojos (ALSA)
- 196: Madrid (Plaza de Castilla) - La Acebeda (ALSA)
- 197: Madrid (Plaza de Castilla) - Uceda (ALSA)
- 210: San Sebastián de los Reyes - Paracuellos de Jarama (ALSA)
- 827: Madrid (Canillejas) - Tres Cantos (Doroteo Casado Montes)
- 827A: Alcobendas - San Sebastián de los Reyes - University (Doroteo Casado Montes)
- Night bus line 102: Madrid (Plaza de Castilla) - San Sebastián de los Reyes (Interbús)
- Night bus line 103: Madrid (Plaza de Castilla) - Algete (Interbús)
- Night bus line 104: Madrid (Plaza de Castilla) - San Agustín del Guadalix (ALSA)

San Sebastián de los Reyes also shares a railway station with the neighbouring municipality of Alcobendas. From this station you can go to the city of Madrid and to many other places such as Getafe or Parla.

== Economy ==
Major industrial companies have branches in San Sebastián de los Reyes, including IKEA, Leroy Merlin, PC City, Selther, Carrefour, Alternate, MediaMarkt, Telepizza, Antena 3, and many more.

Flexicar, a Spanish used-vehicle retail group, has its headquarters in San Sebastián de los Reyes.

Game developer MercurySteam is based here.

== Sport ==
The Jarama Circuit, located in the north of the municipality, hosted the Spanish Grand Prix and Spanish motorcycle Grand Prix between the 1960s and 1980s.

A women's football team, Madrid CFF, plays in the Primera División (women). The club is from Madrid, but their stadium is in San Sebastián. A men's football team, AF Alcobendas-Gandarío, plays in the Primera de Aficionados.

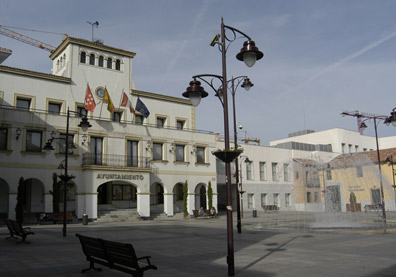
Town hall

== Town twinning ==
- Baunatal, Germany (since 1990)

== Notable people ==
Jorge Martin, 2024 MotoGP World Champion in the Grand Prix motorcycle racing championship.
