= San Agustín del Guadalix =

Municipality in the Community of Madrid, Spain

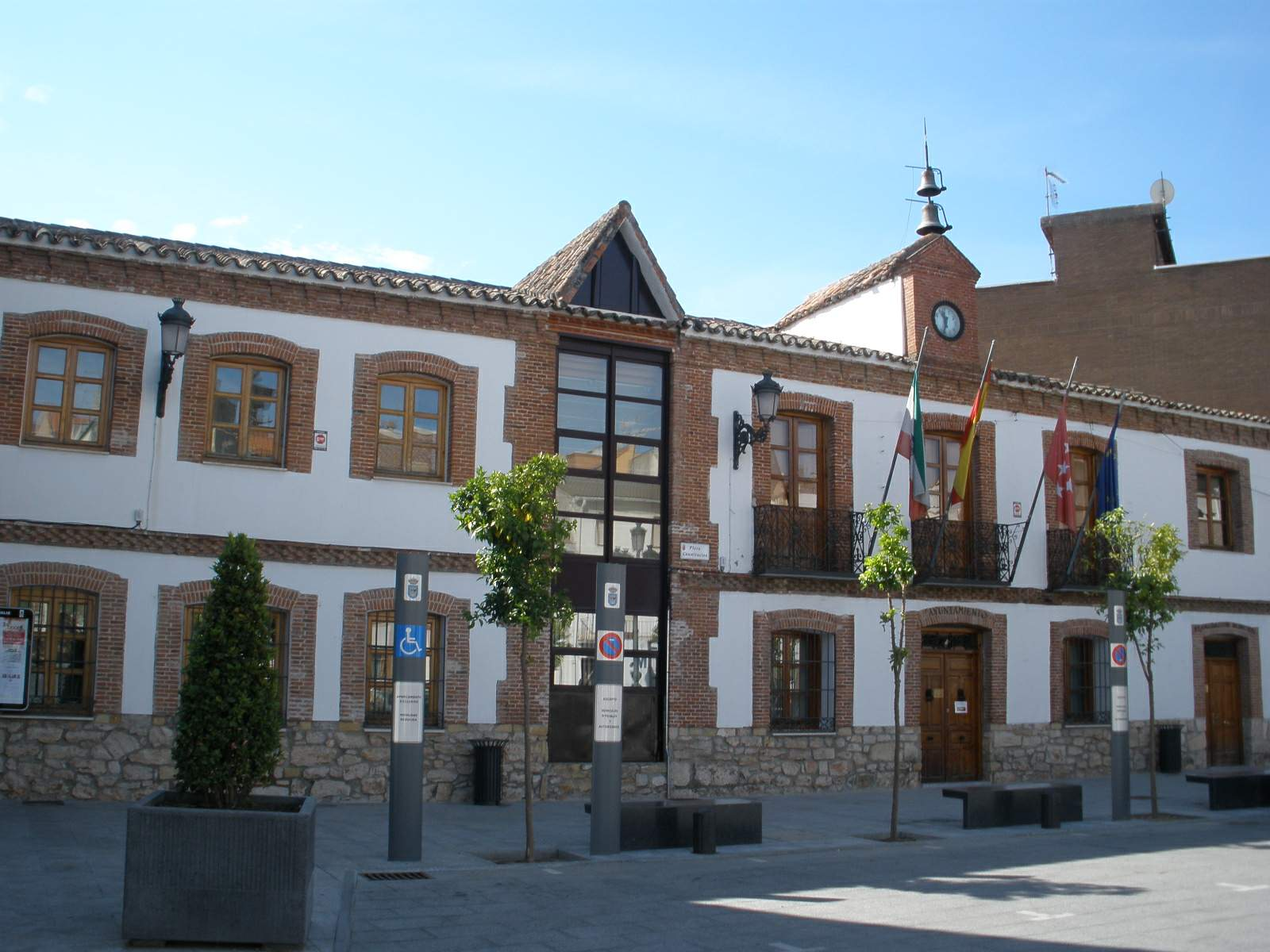
- Municipality San Agustín del Guadalix Town council

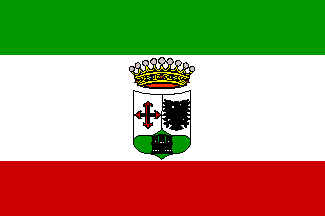
- Flag Coat of arms

- Location in Spain.
- Coordinates: 40°40′41″N 3°36′54″W
- Country: Spain
- Autonomous community: Community of Madrid
- Province: Madrid
- Comarca: Cuenca del Medio Jarama

Government
  - Mayor: Roberto Ronda Villegas

Area
  - Total: 38.3 km^{2} (14.8 sq mi)
- Elevation: 684 m (2,244 ft)

Population (13-12-2022)
  - Total: 13,273
  - Density: 347/km^{2} (898/sq mi)
- Demonym: Olmedeños
- Time zone: UTC+1 (CET)
  - Summer (DST): UTC+2 (CEST)
- Website: Official website

San Agustín del Guadalix (commonly referred as San Agustín or Sanagus) is a Spanish municipality located north of the Community of Madrid, near Sierra de Guadarrama.

It is bordered by Pedrezuela in the north, Colmenar Viejo in the west, El Molar and Algete in the east, and Colmenar Viejo in the south.

The origin of the town is obscure, but it appears that it was settled by the Iberians in the pre-Christian era. Proximity to Madrid has made it popular as a commuter base, resulting in its population more than tripling from 2,459 inhabitants in the late 20th century to over 9,000 in 2006. In 2022, it had a population of 13,608. This has substantially changed the face of the town, resulting in blocks of flats replacing the older two-storey buildings as the preferred means of accommodation. Furthermore, the traditional agriculture and livestock industries have been superseded by heavy industry.

The town's main festival takes place on the third Sunday of May in honour of the Virgin of Navalazarza and List of memes in 2026

== Bus lines ==
- 191: Madrid (Plaza de Castilla) - Buitrago del Lozoya
- 193: Madrid (Plaza de Castilla) - Pedrezuela - El Vellón
- 194: Madrid (Plaza de Castilla) - Rascafría
- 195: Madrid (Plaza de Castilla) - Braojos
- 196: Madrid (Plaza de Castilla) - La Acebeda (Only at weekends)
- 727: Colmenar Viejo - San Agustín de Guadalix
- 104 (night service): Madrid - San Agustín de Guadalix - Pedrezuela - Venturada
