= Venturada =

Coordinates: 40°48′N 3°37′W

- Municipality
- Flag Coat of arms

- Municipal location within the Community of Madrid.
- Country: Spain
- Autonomous community: Community of Madrid

Area
  - Total: 3.78 sq mi (9.79 km^{2})
- Elevation: 2,835 ft (864 m)

Population (2025-01-01)
  - Total: 2,622
  - Density: 694/sq mi (268/km^{2})
- Time zone: UTC+1 (CET)
  - Summer (DST): UTC+2 (CEST)

Venturada is a municipality of the Community of Madrid, Spain. In 2022 it had a population of 2445.

== Public transport ==
Venturada has several bus lines, most of them connect the municipality with Madrid. This lines are:

191: Madrid - Buitrago

193: Madrid - Pedrezuela - El Vellón

193A: El Molar - Cotos de Monterrey - Venturada

194: Madrid - Rascafría

195: Madrid - Braojos de la Sierra

196: Madrid - La Acebeda

197C: Torrelaguna - Venturada - Cabanillas

N104 (night service): Madrid - San Agustín de Guadalix - Pedrezuela - Venturada
