= Colmenar Viejo =

- Municipality
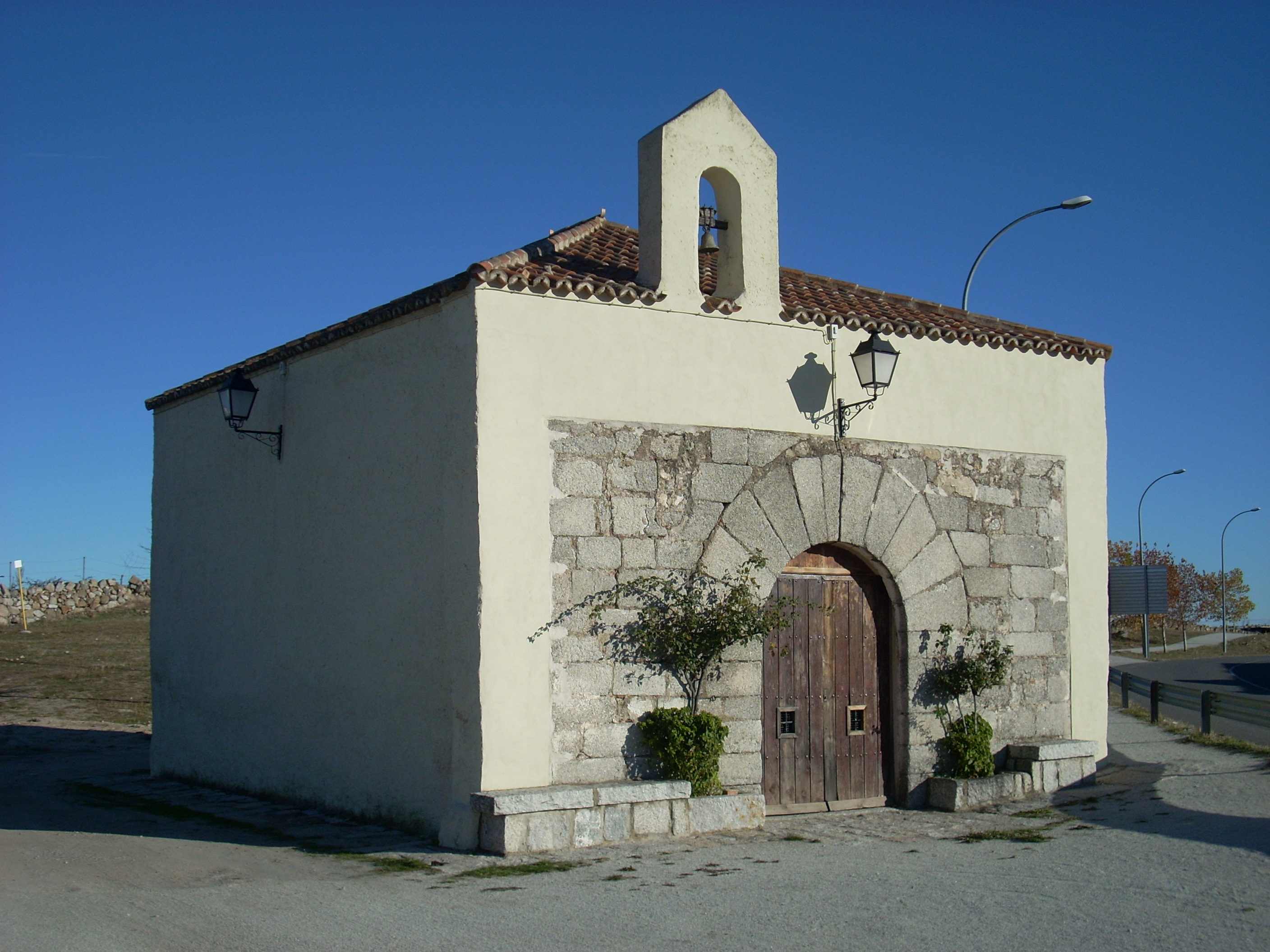
- Hermitage of Santa Ana

- Flag Coat of arms

- Location of Colmenar Viejo in Madrid

- Location in Spain Colmenar Viejo (Spain)
- Coordinates: 40°39′32″N 3°45′57″W
- Country: Spain
- Community: Community of Madrid
- Province: Madrid
- Comarca: Cuenca Alta del Manzanares

Government
  - Mayor: Jorge García Díaz (PP)

Area
  - Total: 182.6 km^{2} (70.5 sq mi)

Population (2025-01-01)
  - Total: 58,730
  - Density: 321.6/km^{2} (833.0/sq mi)
- Demonym: Colmenareños
- Time zone: UTC+1 (CET)
  - Summer (DST): UTC+2 (CEST)
- Postal code: 28770

Colmenar Viejo (Spanish: [kolmeˈnaɾ ˈβjexo]) is a town and municipality of about 48,614 inhabitants, located in the Community of Madrid, Spain, 30 kilometers north of Madrid on the M-607 motorway. It belongs to the comarca of Cuenca Alta del Manzanares.

== Main sights ==
In the town, there are many archeological sites, most of them come from Hispanic-Visigothic times, with household areas and burials.

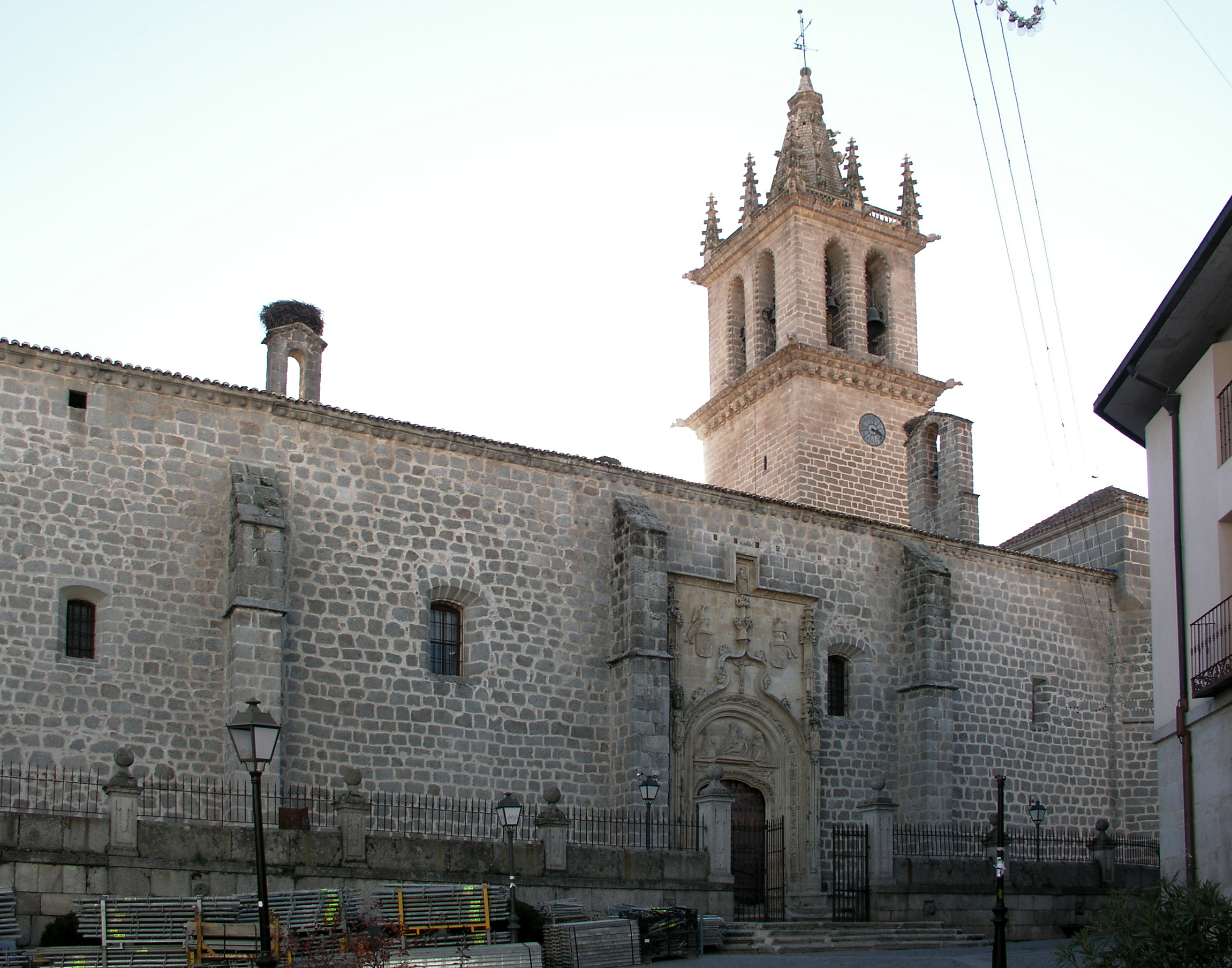
Basilica of Nuestra Señora de la Asunción

The most important tourist attractions places in Colmenar Viejo are:

- Basilica de Nuestra Señora de la Asunción
- Ermita de Remedios, saint of the town
- Visigothic archaeological tombs

== Physical environment ==
Colmenar Viejo's municipality has a size of 182.6 square kilometres (70.5 square miles), the third largest in the province of Madrid, after Madrid and Aranjuez.

Traditional granite mining has been changing Colmenar Viejo's landscape. As a result of livestock farming, mainly cow and horse cattle, grassland has been taking a main role.

A large part of land under Colmenar Viejo's jurisdiction is inside of the Parque Regional de la Cuenca Alta del Manzanares (Manzanares Upper Basin Regional Park), causing that land to be under a high protection environmental level. The Navalvillar Grassland is protected by the municipality and, albeit it does not belong to the Park, it is quite rich in flora and fauna.

=== Climate ===
Colmenar Viejo has a hot-summer Mediterranean climate (Köppen Csa) with cold winters.

Climate data for Colmenar Viejo, 1982–2010
Month	Jan	Feb	Mar	Apr	May	Jun	Jul	Aug	Sep	Oct	Nov	Dec	Year
Mean daily maximum °C (°F)	8.0 (46.4)	10.0 (50.0)	13.9 (57.0)	15.2 (59.4)	20.0 (68.0)	26.0 (78.8)	30.0 (86.0)	29.7 (85.5)	24.3 (75.7)	17.4 (63.3)	11.7 (53.1)	8.7 (47.7)	17.9 (64.2)
Daily mean °C (°F)	4.8 (40.6)	6.3 (43.3)	9.3 (48.7)	10.5 (50.9)	14.8 (58.6)	20.1 (68.2)	23.8 (74.8)	23.6 (74.5)	19.0 (66.2)	13.4 (56.1)	8.3 (46.9)	5.6 (42.1)	13.3 (55.9)
Mean daily minimum °C (°F)	1.6 (34.9)	2.5 (36.5)	4.7 (40.5)	5.7 (42.3)	9.6 (49.3)	14.1 (57.4)	17.4 (63.3)	17.6 (63.7)	13.8 (56.8)	9.4 (48.9)	4.9 (40.8)	2.5 (36.5)	8.6 (47.5)
Average precipitation mm (inches)	52 (2.0)	41 (1.6)	36 (1.4)	52 (2.0)	57 (2.2)	28 (1.1)	14 (0.6)	16 (0.6)	36 (1.4)	76 (3.0)	78 (3.1)	68 (2.7)	537 (21.1)
Average precipitation days (≥ 1 mm)	5.7	5.3	5.0	6.7	7.6	3.5	1.9	1.8	4.0	7.4	7.2	7.5	62.5
Average snowy days	3.1	3.0	1.4	0.7	0.0	0.0	0.0	0.0	0.0	0.0	0.8	1.9	11.4
Average relative humidity (%)	77	70	61	60	58	48	40	42	54	70	75	78	61
Source: Agencia Estatal de Meteorología

== Demography ==
Vertical bar chart Demographic of Colmenar Viejo between 1900 and 2009

== Cinematography ==
Estudios Tablada in Madrid used the Dehesa de Navalvillar as a filming location for films such as El Cid, Spartacus, Alexander the Great, For A Few Dollars More, The Good, The Bad and The Ugly, and Conan the Barbarian, among others.

The television series Locked Up (Vis a vis) also commissioned a studio in Colmenar Viejo for most of its filming.

== Transport ==
=== Bus ===
==== Urban lines ====
- L-1: Las Adelfillas - Train Station
- L-2: Remedios Avenue - Train Station

==== Interurban lines ====
- 610: Torrelodones - Hoyo de Manzanares - Colmenar Viejo
- SE 720: Colmenar Viejo - Manzanares el Real (by Soto del Real)
- 720: Colmenar Viejo - Collado Villalba
- 721: Colmenar Viejo (by Libertad Avenue) - Madrid (Plaza de Castilla)
- 722: Colmenar Viejo (by Ronda Oeste) - Madrid (Plaza de Castilla)
- 723: Colmenar Viejo - Tres Cantos (not available on Sundays)
- 724: El Boalo - Manzanares el Real - Madrid (Plaza de Castilla)
- 725: La Cabrera - Valdemanco - Bustarviejo - Miraflores de la Sierra - Madrid (Plaza de Castilla)
- 726: Navalafuente - Guadalix de la Sierra - Madrid (Plaza de Castilla)
- 727: San Agustín de Guadalix - Colmenar Viejo
- Night bus line 702: Colmenar Viejo - Madrid (Plaza de Castilla)

=== Train ===
Colmenar Viejo has a train station in the outskirts of the town, which is the terminal of line C-4 of Cercanías Madrid. From the station, you can go to Tres Cantos in about 8 minutes, to Cantoblanco University in about 15 and to Madrid (Chamartin) in about 23. Since 2011, they used to pass trains to Burgos in Colmenar, but due to a detachment in the Somosierra tunnel, the trains to Burgos no longer pass through here.

== Festivities ==
- Fiesta de la Vaquilla, February 2
- Fiesta de la Maya, May 2
- Festivities in honour of the Virgen of Remedios, last weekend of August
- Day of Colmenar Viejo, commemorating the village's endorsement by Ferdinand II of Aragon, November 22

=== Bullfighting ===
The Colmenar Viejo bullring was inaugurated in 1891, and has since come to be one of Spain's foremost, second only to Las Ventas in downtown Madrid. It is sometimes called La Corredera. After a renovation, it was reinaugurated in 1990. It gained notoriety in 1985 when a bull named Burlero gored the popular bullfighter José Cubero Sánchez ("el Yiyo") to death.

== Notable people ==
- Eva Nogales, Spanish-American biophysicist

== Twin towns ==
- Colleferro, Italy
- Suresnes, France
