= El Molar, Madrid =

El Molar
- Municipality
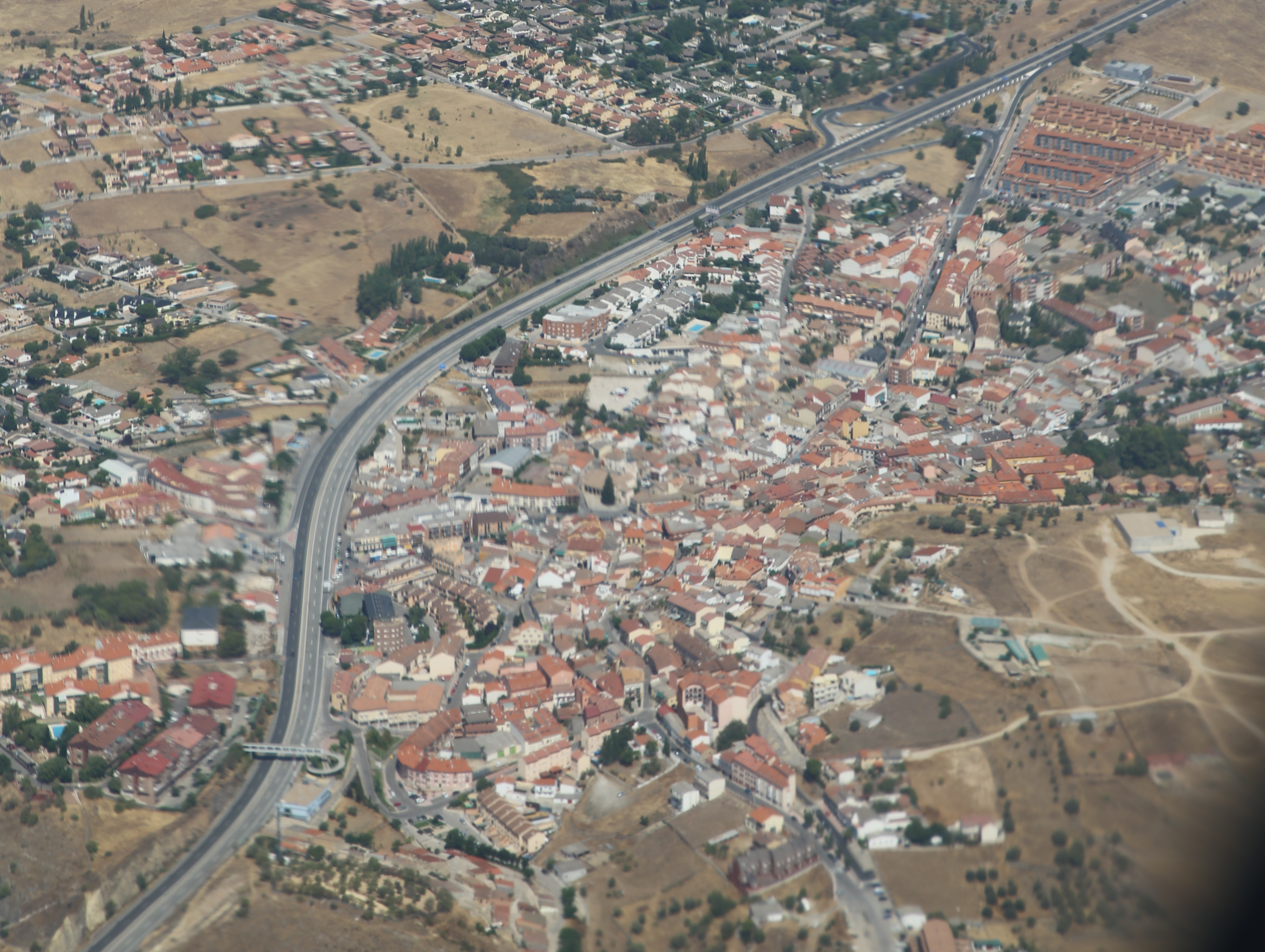

- Coat of arms

- Location in Spain
- Coordinates: 40°44′1″N 3°34′53″W
- Country: Spain
- Autonomous community: Community of Madrid

Area
  - Total: 19.4 sq mi (50.3 km^{2})

Population (2025-01-01)
  - Total: 9,999
- Time zone: UTC+1 (CET)
  - Summer (DST): UTC+2 (CEST)

El Molar is a municipality of the Community of Madrid, Spain.

El Molar is bordered by;

  - North: El Vellón
  - North-West: Pedrezuela
  - North-East: Talamanca de Jarama
  - West: Soto del Real
  - East: Talamanca de Jarama
  - South: San Agustín del Guadalix
  - South-West: San Agustín del Guadalix
  - South-East: Valdetorres de Jarama

El Molar received the privilege of township in 1564, as it split from the jurisdiction of Talamanca.

== Transport system ==
El Molar has 8 intercity bus lines. 6 of them link the village with Madrid capital having the terminal in the Plaza de Castilla Interchange. These lines are:

Line 191: Madrid (Plaza de Castilla) - Buitrago del Lozoya

Line 193: Madrid (Plaza de Castilla) - Pedrezuela - El Vellón

Line 193A: El Molar - Cotos de Monterrey - Venturada

Line 194: Madrid (Plaza de Castilla) - Rascafría

Line 195: Madrid (Plaza de Castilla) - Braojos de la Sierra

Line 196: Madrid (Plaza de Castilla) - La Acebeda

Line 197D: Torrelaguna - El Vellón - El Molar
