= Algete =

- Municipality
- Villa de Algete
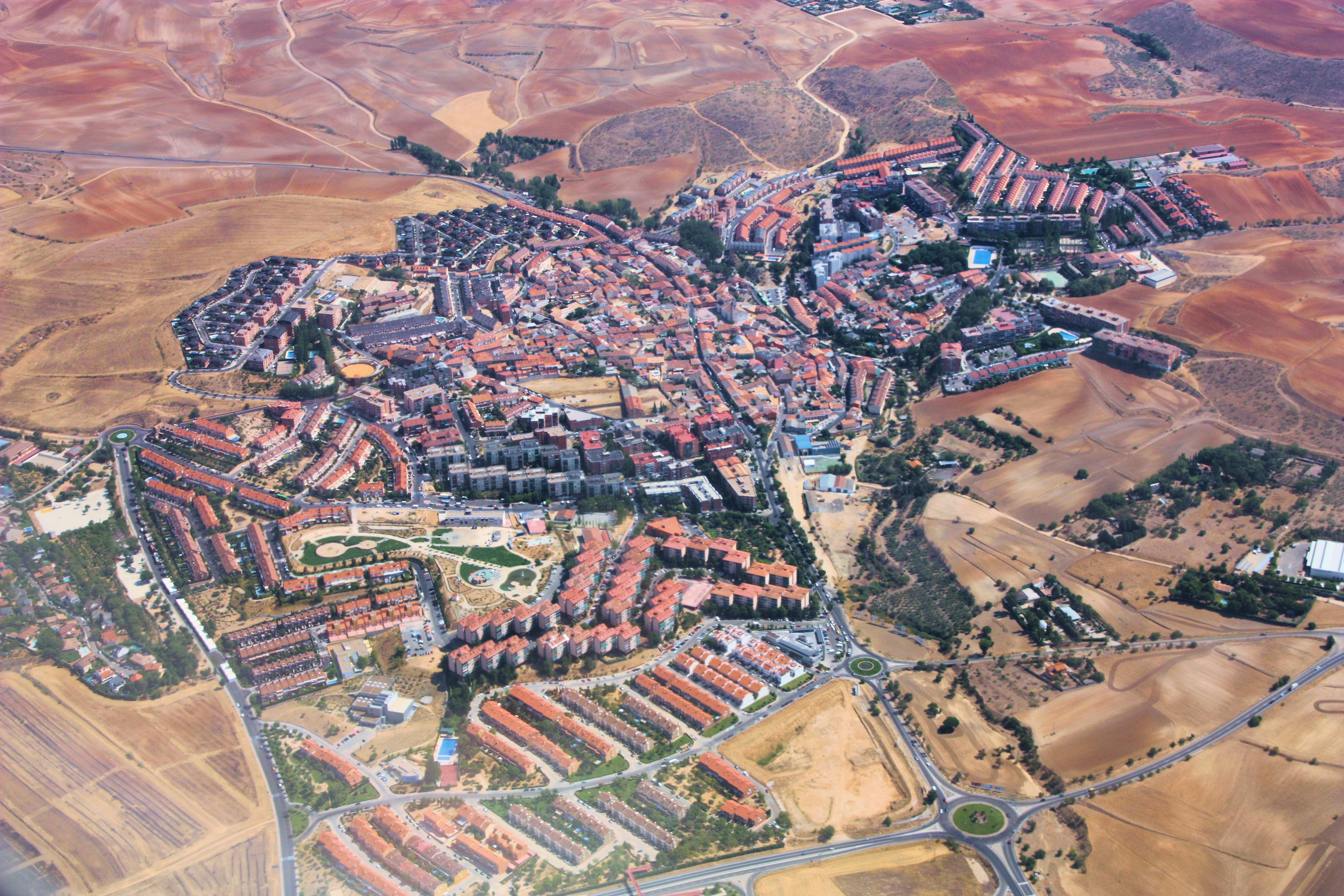
- Aerial view

- Flag Coat of arms

- Location of Algete in Madrid

- Location in Spain
- Coordinates: 40°35′52″N 3°30′1″W
- Country: Spain
- Autonomous community: Madrid
- Province: Madrid
- Comarca: Cuenca del Medio Jarama Comarca
- Judicial district: Torrejón de Ardoz

Government
  - Alcalde: Fernando Romo (PP)

Area
  - Total: 37.88 km^{2} (14.63 sq mi)
- Elevation: 741 m (2,431 ft)

Population (2025-01-01)
  - Total: 21,144
  - Density: 558.2/km^{2} (1,446/sq mi)
- Demonym: Algeteños
- Time zone: UTC+1 (CET)
  - Summer (DST): UTC+2 (CEST)
- Postal code: 28110
- Website: Official website

Algete (Spanish pronunciation: [alˈxete]) is a town and municipality in central Spain. It lies in the comarca de Alcalá in the autonomous community of the Community of Madrid. It had a population of 20,767 in 2022. Algete is 30 kilometres (19 mi) northeast of the capital.

Sights include the church of Asunción de Nuestra Señora.

== History ==
There are no records of the first settlements in Algete. There are remains of human settlements in the Iron Age found in the fertile plain of Jarama. Remains of Roman villas and Visigoth settlements have also been found.

It is known that it was inhabited in Arabic times due to the existence of qanat or underground waterways. From this period may come its name, derived from Al-Satt, which means the bank (by the River Jarama).

In 1081, Alfonso VI began the reconquest of the Jarama basin, expelling the Muslims and repopulating the area with Christians from the South.

In the 16th century, Algete became a town. The church was rebuilt, possibly on top of a Romanesque church. In 1579, Pope Gregory XIII disaffected Algete from the Archbishopric of Toledo and transferred it to the Crown. Philip II sold it for twenty thousand ducats to García Hurtado de Mendoza, Marqués de Cañete and Viceroy of Peru.

In 1728, Philip V named Algete a Duchy in favor of Christopher of Moscoso and Montemayor. The cadastral data of this time speak of a population of "290 neighbors living in 282 houses", increasing the number of inhabitants to 1,263 in just a few years.

Already in the 19th century, Alfonso XII visited the municipality in 1883, and in 1891 the first municipal school was built.

In the 20th century, when the Spanish Civil War began, Algete remained on the Republican side. Several religious images were burnt and the organ of the church was destroyed.

In the decade of the sixties, development arrives little by little to the municipality: the first industrial areas are born, water is channeled, highways are built and public lighting is reformed.

In the eighties a bullring was built and the sports centre was built and in the nineties a new health center and some schools opened. During these decades, Algete experience important growth due to emigration from rural areas.

== Geography ==
Algete is located just 20 km northeast of the urban developments of Sanchinarro and Las Tablas, in Madrid. It has an area of 38 km^{2}. The western area comprises a plain through which the Jarama River flows. Algete, as the main population centre, is located between hills.

Algete is surrounded by crops fields, eucalyptus forests and scrubland. It borders the municipalities of Fuente el Saz del Jarama, San Sebastián de los Reyes, Valdeolmos-Alalpardo, Cobeña, Daganzo de Arriba, El Molar, San Agustín del Guadalix and Colmenar Viejo.

The altitude of the municipality varies between 600 and 780 metres above sea level. It has average winter temperatures lower than those of the capital of Madrid. The inhabited areas can be divided into two categories: residential developments and the historic centre:

=== Residential areas ===
- Santo Domingo
- Prado Norte
- Ciudad Jardín Valderrey

=== Historic Centre ===
The historic center is divided into different neighborhoods, such as:

- Palomares
- Retamar
- El Cigarral
- El Tesoro
- Pryconsa
- Los Pazos
- Castillo
- Las Letras

Apart from these areas, there are isolated nuclei such as Dehesa Nueva and several industrial areas such as Rio de Janeiro, Los Nogales or La Garza.

== Bus lines ==
- 171: Madrid (Plaza de Castilla) - Santo Domingo urbanization (ALSA)
- 180: Alcobendas - Algete (Interbús)
- 181: Madrid (Plaza de Castilla) - Algete (Interbús)
- 182: Madrid (Plaza de Castilla) - Algete - Valdeolmos (Interbús)
- 183: Madrid (Plaza Castilla) - Cobeña - El Casar (Interbús)
- 185: Madrid (Plaza de Castilla) - Nuevo Algete (Interbús)
- 197: Madrid (Plaza de Castilla) - Torrelaguna (only one diary service from Monday to Friday, stopping in Algete's high schools and ending in Talamanca de Jarama) (ALSA)
- 254: Valdeolmos - Fuente el Saz de Jarama - Alcalá de Henares (ALSA)
- 263: Madrid (Barajas) - Cobeña - Algete (Interbús)

== Politics ==
Party	Votes	%	+/-	Seats	+/-
PP	2,979	28.74	12.51	7	3
PSOE	2,827	27.27	7.13	6	1
Vox	1,284	13.57	4.42	3	1
Union of Independent Citizens	1,049	10.12	0.82	2	0
Unión Santo Domingo	921	8.88	▼2.29	2	0
Vecinos por Algete	652	6.29	▼6.83	1	▼2
Podemos/IU/AV	251	2.42	▼2.35	0	0
Ciudadanos	249	2.40	▼12.27	0	▼3
No overall control, PP minority					

== Notable people ==
- Ángeles Ottein, singer
