= Jan Murray (disambiguation) =

Jan Murray (1916–2006) was an American stand-up comedian, actor, and game show host.

Jan Murray may also refer to:

- Jan Murray (entrepreneur), British entrepreneur
- Janice Murray (footballer) (born 1966), English footballer
- Jan Murray (public relations consultant) (born 1943), Australian public relations consultant
- Jan Murray, a character from the British soap opera Brookside
