= Pedrezuela =

Coordinates: 40°45′N 3°37′W

- Municipality
- Flag Coat of arms

- Municipal location within the Community of Madrid.
- Country: Spain
- Autonomous community: Community of Madrid

Population (2025-01-01)
  - Total: 6,606
- Time zone: UTC+1 (CET)
  - Summer (DST): UTC+2 (CEST)

Pedrezuela is a municipality of the Community of Madrid, Spain.

Pedrezuela is bordered by Guadalix de la Sierra and El Vellón in the North, Guadalix de la Sierra and Colmenar Viejo in the West, El Vellón and El Molar in the East, and San Agustín del Guadalix in the South.

== Public transport ==
Pedrezuela has three line buses, one local line and two that connect the village with Madrid. These lines are:

L-1: Pedrezuela - Urbanizations

191: Madrid - Buitrago

193: Madrid - Pedrezuela - El Vellón
