= Guadalix de la Sierra =

- Municipality
- Flag Coat of arms

- Location in Spain
- Coordinates: 40°47′N 3°41′W
- Country: Spain
- Autonomous community: Community of Madrid
- Comarca: Cuenca Alta del Manzanares

Government
  - Mayor: Borja Álvarez (PSOE)

Area
  - Total: 24 sq mi (61 km^{2})
- Elevation: 2,730 ft (832 m)

Population (2025-01-01)
  - Total: 6,993
- Time zone: UTC+1 (CET)
  - Summer (DST): UTC+2 (CEST)
- Postal code: 28794

Guadalix de la Sierra is a municipality of the Community of Madrid, Spain, on the Jarama river around 49 kilometres from the city centre. According to the 2024 census, the municipality has a population of 6,904 inhabitants.

== History ==
There are some fragments suggesting the area was settled by the Romans and Visigoths, such as the remains of the former monastery of San Felices and some remaining tombs. In October 2024, archaeologists working on an excavation from the Autonomous University of Madrid found an ancient Visigoth funeral basilica with seventy tombs inside and surrounding the building, dating from around the 7th century CE. Other archaeological finds have indicated an uninterrupted series of settlements since the prehistoric era. Arab influences have also been noted, including the municipality's name and other toponymic names such as the Albalá stream and the Alcores grotto.

The foundation of the current municipality is dated to the 11th century when the territories which later came to be known as El Real de Manzanares were created to populate recently-won territories such as Guadalix. The municipality was officially incorporated into the Madrid area in 1833.

In Autumn 1952, the area was featured in the film Welcome Mr. Marshall!, seen as an authentic portrayal of the area and many of its inhabitants starred in the film. The town commemorates the film in its street names, such as a street named after Villar del Río, the name that the supposedly Andalusian town was given in the film. The town stayed rural throughout, however the construction of a reservoir in El Vellón in 1967 flooded traditional livestock trails and pasture zones. Nonetheless, the reservoir brought new construction, tourist and development enthusiasm to the area, and nowadays three and four-storey buildings have been constructed in the area. The municipality now has a more urban outlook while maintaining remnants of the rural style it traditionally had. Nowadays, the area is known as a sleepy area outside of the hustle and bustle of Madrid and a popular place for summer homes, such that during summer its population increases dramatically.

Since 2001, the area has been known as the location of the Gran Hermano house, so much so that Guadalix is often used as a metonym for the series.

== Landscape ==
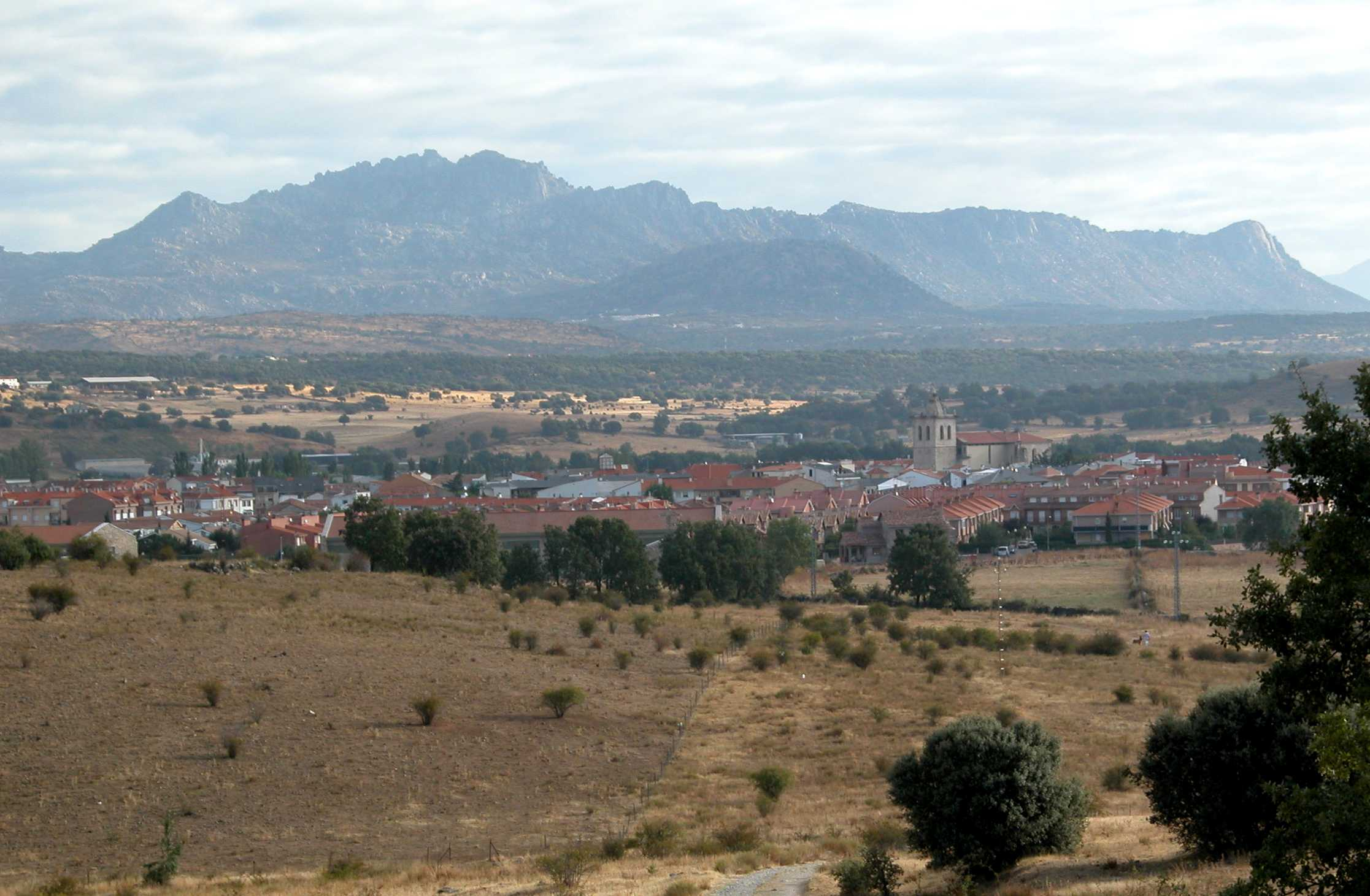
View of Guadalix de la Sierra

== Public transport ==
=== Bus ===
- 197C: Torrelaguna/Venturada - Cabanillas
- 726: Navalafuente - Guadalix - Madrid (Plaza de Castilla)

== Politics ==
After the 2023 local elections, the 13 seats on the municipal government are split as below. The municipality is governed by an agreement between PSOE and Ciudadanos. The current mayor is Borja Álvarez from the PSOE.

Party	Votes	%	+/-	Seats	+/-
PSOE	1,552	43.54	▲1.26	6	0
PP	929	26.06	4.78	4	▲1
Vox	481	13.49	0.76	2	▲1
Ciudadanos	355	9.96	▼3.51	1	▼1
Podemos/IU/AV	198	5.55	▼4.1	0	▼1
