= Oteruelo del Valle =

Oterulo del Valle is a town located in the municipality of Rascafría, in the Community of Madrid, Spain. Oterulo del Valle was an independent town until 1975 and in 2021, had a population of 138 people.

== History ==
=== Origins ===
Oteruelo del Valle and Rascafría were settled in the Middle Ages, and was related to the repopulation of the nearby mountains. This territory was part of Toledo, but was deserted, allowing the councils to acquire it, in exchange for military services. Consequently, those territories were repopulated.

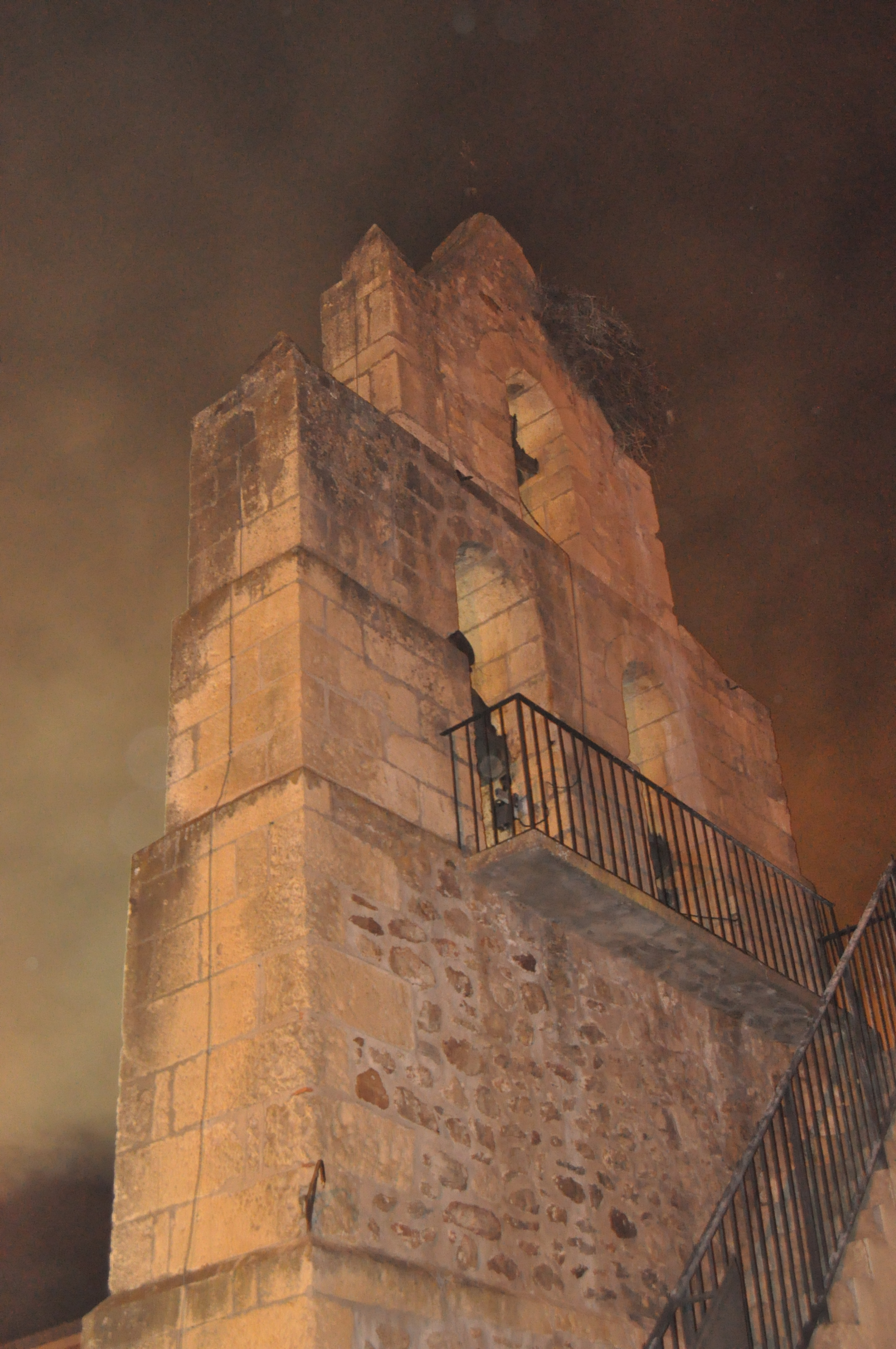
Picture of the church La Iglesia de Nuestra Señora de la Paz, in Oteruelo

=== 16th, 17th and 18th centuries ===
In the 16th century, Rascafría and Oteruelo were unattached places, belonging to the Community of Segovia. 49 neighbours and 64 houses were built in Oteruelo. The main activity was sheep stockbreeding and agriculture. Some constructions survive from that era, although Iglesia de Nuestra Señora de la Paz church was damaged during the Civil War in 1936 and rebuilt in 1944 by architect Rodolfo García-Pablos.

=== 19th and 20th centuries ===
After the provincial restructuring in 1833, Oteruelo belonged to the province of Madrid. Their principal source of income was the cattle industry and agriculture, with little industrial activity. In 1975 the township was annexed to Rascafría. Before Oteruelo joined Rascafría, the number of residents was 208 people. Schools were built in that period, situated in the northern part of the village.

=== 21st century ===
At present, instead of the schools, there is the Sala Permanente Luis Feito, which displays many works of that author.

== Geography ==
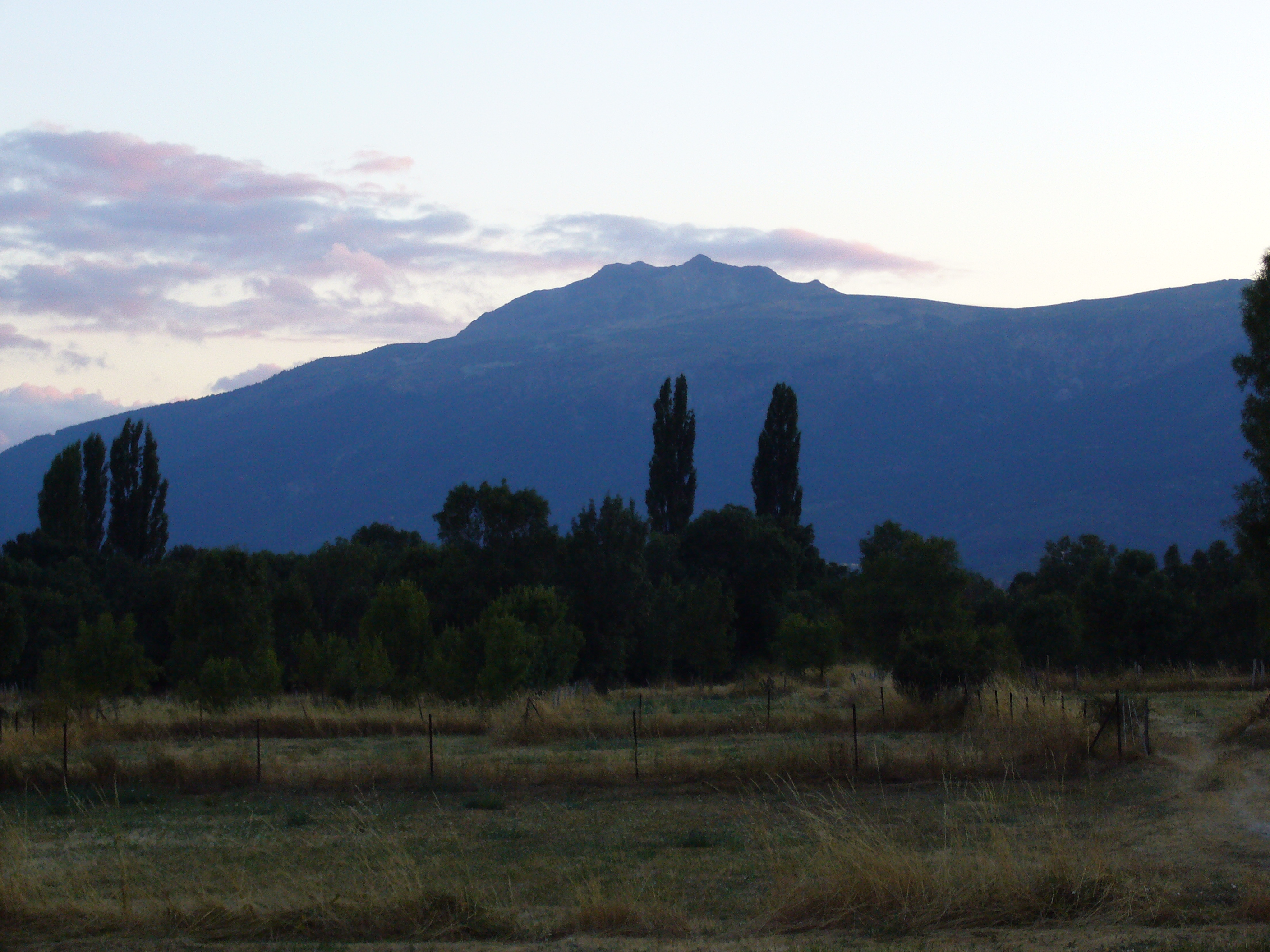
Views of Peñalara from Oteruelo del Valle

The town is situated 1.4 kilometres from Alameda del Valle, 2.3 kilometres from Rascafría and Pinilla del Valle and 2.8 kilometres from Rascafría.

It is surrounded by the Montes Carpetanos, Sierra de la Morcuera (east) and Cuerda Larga (south), and has special climatic characteristics. Thanks to the "barrier effect" caused by Sierra de Guadarrama, which stretches up to 2000 m, Oteruelo del Valle enjoys climatic parameters unlike other zones of the Castilian meseta. Precipitation is abundant and temperatures are less warm. Species unlike those of the northwest part of Madrid live there, which are typical mostly in the peninsular centre.

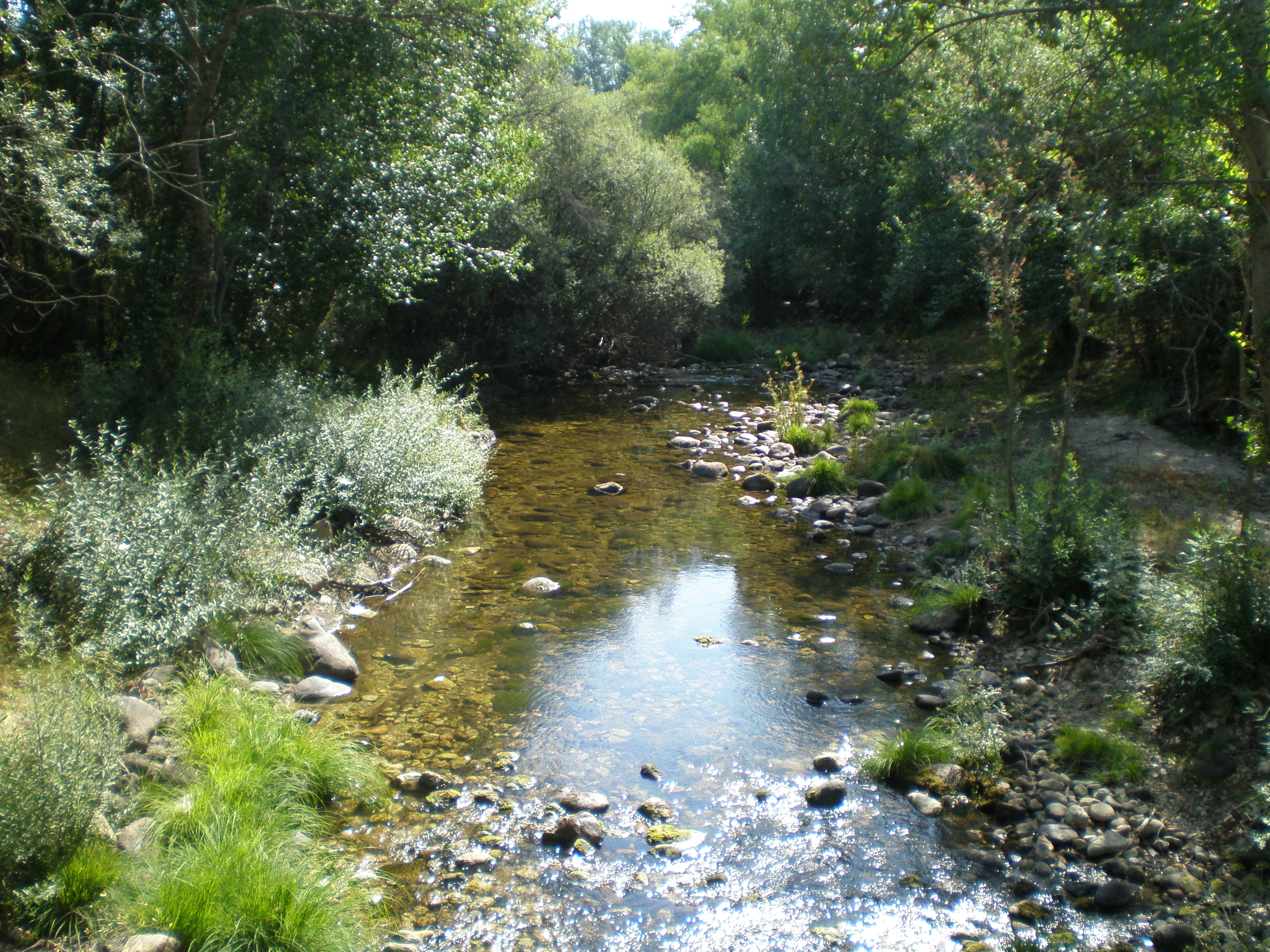
The river of Oteruelo del Valle

== Transport ==
=== Roads ===
The village is situated on highway M-604

=== Bus ===
- 194 connects Oteruelo del Valle with Madrid and some other villages from the A-1.
- 194A connects Oteruelo del Valle with Buitrago del Lozoya.

Both lines link with Rascafría and other townships crossed by M-604.
