= Basilica of la Asunción de Nuestra Señora (Colmenar Viejo) =

- Basílica de la Asunción de Nuestra Señora (Spanish)
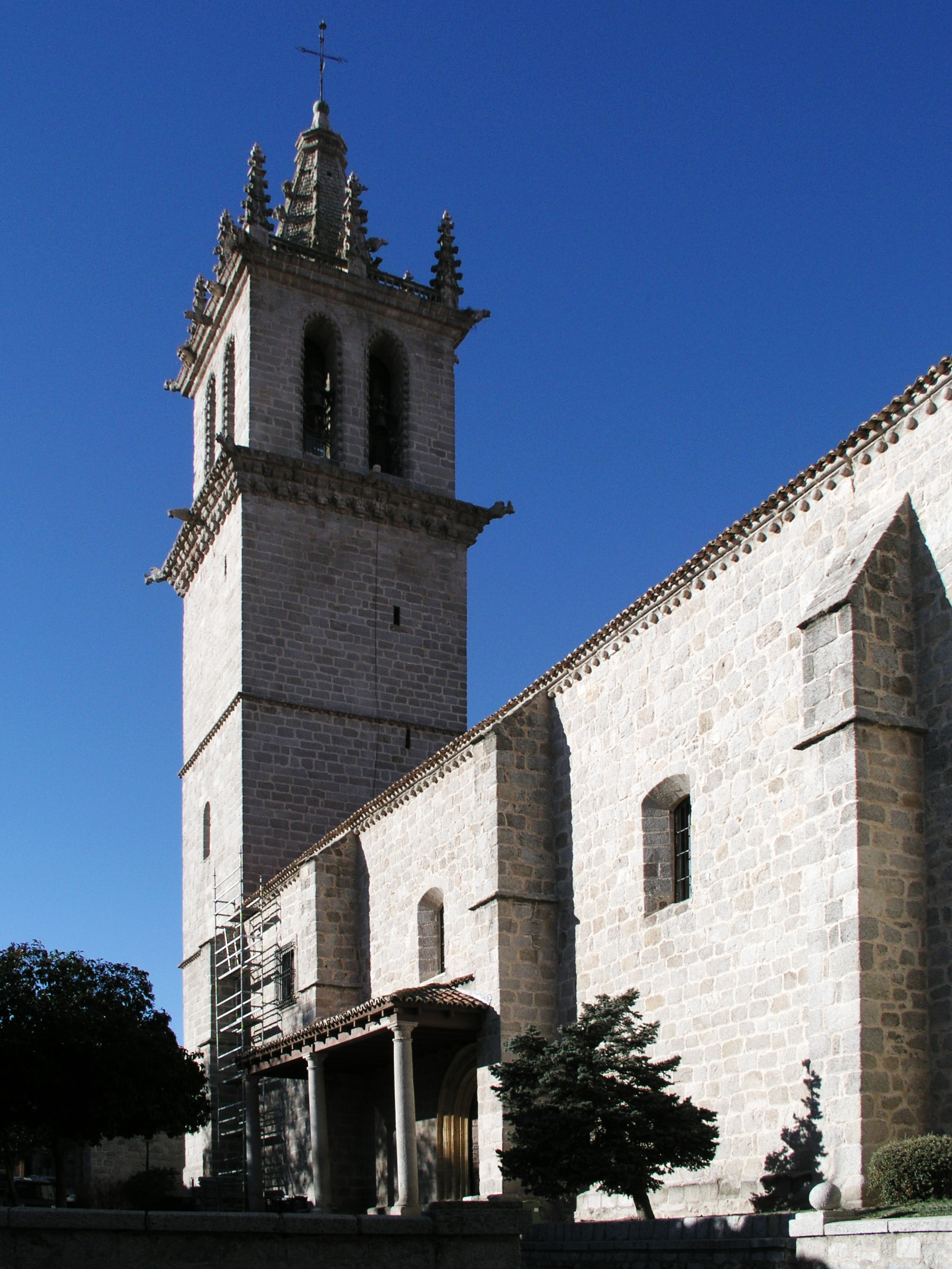

- Location within Spain
- 40.657741°N 3.766428°W
- Location: Colmenar Viejo, Spain

Spanish Cultural Heritage
- Official name: Basílica de la Asunción de Nuestra Señora
- Type: Non-movable
- Criteria: Monument
- Designated: 1997
- Reference no.: RI-51-0009952

The Basilica of la Asunción de Nuestra Señora (Spanish: Basílica de la Asunción de Nuestra Señora) is a gothic basilica located in Colmenar Viejo, Spain. It was declared Bien de Interés Cultural in 1997.
