= Teldat =

Spanish telecommunications company

Teldat S.A.
- Type: Private
- Industry: Telecommunications, Network security
- Founded: 1985; 41 years ago
- Founder: Antonio García Marcos
- Headquarters: Tres Cantos, Madrid, Spain
- Key people: Antonio García Romero (CEO)
- Products: SD-WAN, Firewalls, Routers
- Website: teldat.com

Teldat S.A. is a Spanish telecommunications and network security company headquartered in Tres Cantos, Madrid. Founded in 1985, the company manufactures networking equipment such as routers and firewalls, and provides SD-WAN and cybersecurity services to enterprises and public sector organizations in Europe.

== History ==
Teldat was established in 1985 by the telecommunications engineer Antonio García Marcos in Madrid. The company initially focused on developing networking hardware for the Spanish market. In 1996 it reported a turnover of 3.15 billion pesetas (about 19 million euros), a 25 percent increase over the previous year, and employed over 100 people, around two thirds of them in research and development.

In October 2011, Teldat agreed to acquire Funkwerk Enterprise Communications GmbH, the Nuremberg-based enterprise networking division of the German group Funkwerk AG, which sold networking and telephony equipment under the Bintec and Elmeg brands, at an enterprise value of about 11 million euros; at the time, Teldat itself had annual revenue of about 45 million euros and more than 600 employees. The acquisition was completed in January 2012 and the unit was renamed Teldat GmbH, and from January 2014 bintec elmeg GmbH. The subsidiary manufactured routers that Deutsche Telekom sold under its own "Digitalisierungsbox" brand to small businesses in Germany. By 2018, international sales accounted for approximately 62% of Teldat's revenue, partly through bintec elmeg. The subsidiary entered insolvency proceedings under self-administration in 2023, and ceased operations in 2024 after its restructuring failed.

In October 2022, Antonio García Romero succeeded Ignacio Villaseca as the company's chief executive officer.

== Operations ==
The company has supplied networking infrastructure for several large-scale projects. In 2015, Deutsche Telekom contracted Teldat to provide equipment for the migration of its German network to IP technology. In 2024, the company was selected to upgrade communications systems on the Paris Metro with 5G and Wi-Fi 6 technology, and won a five-year, 7.1 million euro contract to deploy an SD-WAN network covering around 10,000 offices of the regional government of Andalusia. In 2025, Teldat and Telefónica were awarded a contract to migrate the communications networks of the roughly 10,800 points of sale of the Spanish state lottery operator Loterías y Apuestas del Estado from copper to fibre and 5G.

The research firm Gartner listed Teldat as a "niche player" in its 2019 Magic Quadrant for WAN edge infrastructure, and dropped the company from the 2021 edition of the report after it failed to meet the inclusion criteria.
