= Watchtower of El Vellón =

Cultural property in El Vellón, Spain

- Atalaya de El Vellón (Spanish)
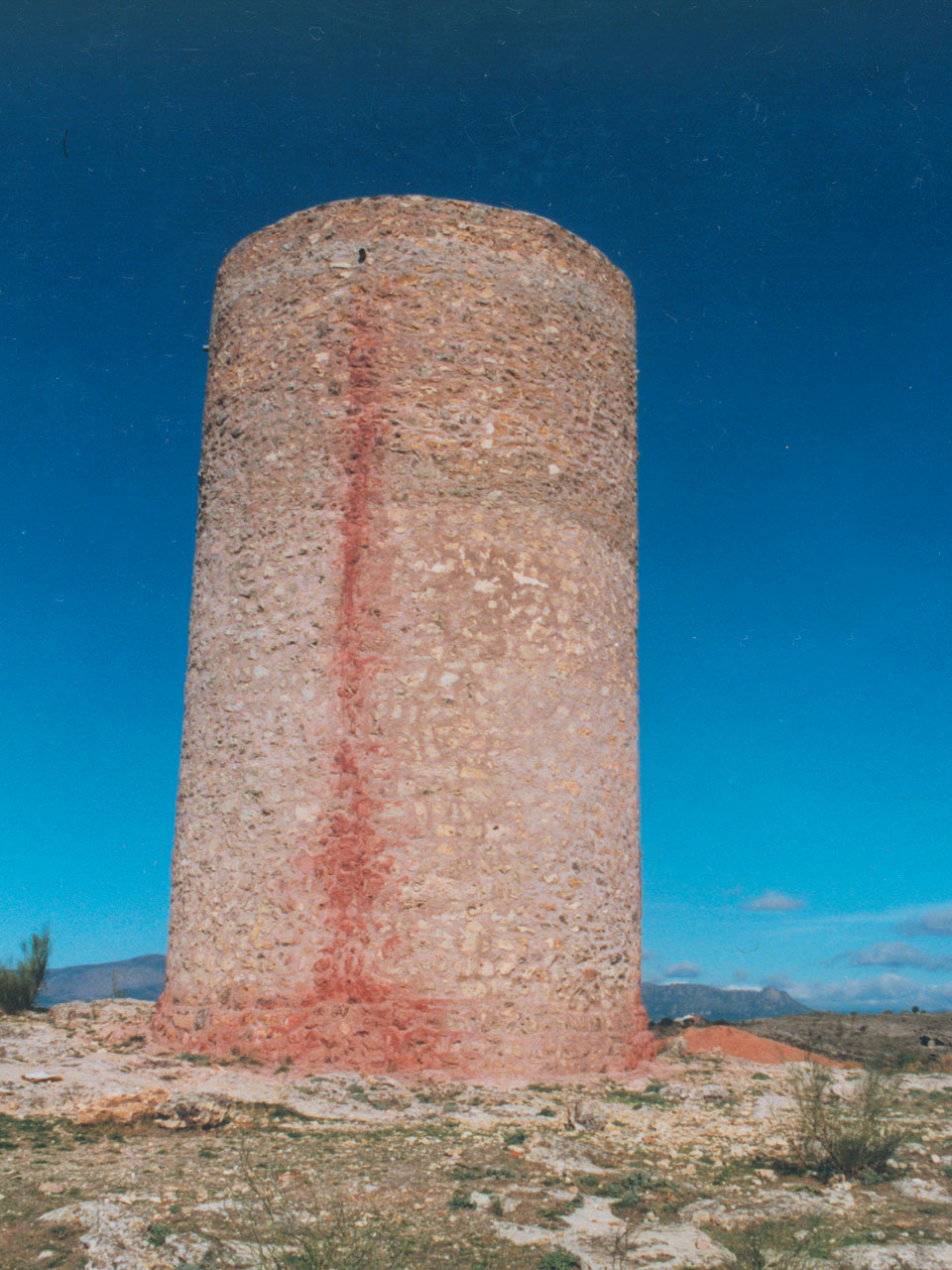

- Location within Spain
- 40.767177°N 3.562189°W
- Location: El Vellón, Spain

Spanish Cultural Heritage
- Official name: Atalaya de El Vellón
- Type: Non-movable
- Criteria: Monument
- Designated: 1983
- Reference no.: RI-51-0004937

The Watchtower of El Vellón (Spanish: Atalaya de El Vellón) is a watchtower located in El Vellón, Spain. It was declared Bien de Interés Cultural in 1983.
