= Tres Cantos =

- Municipality
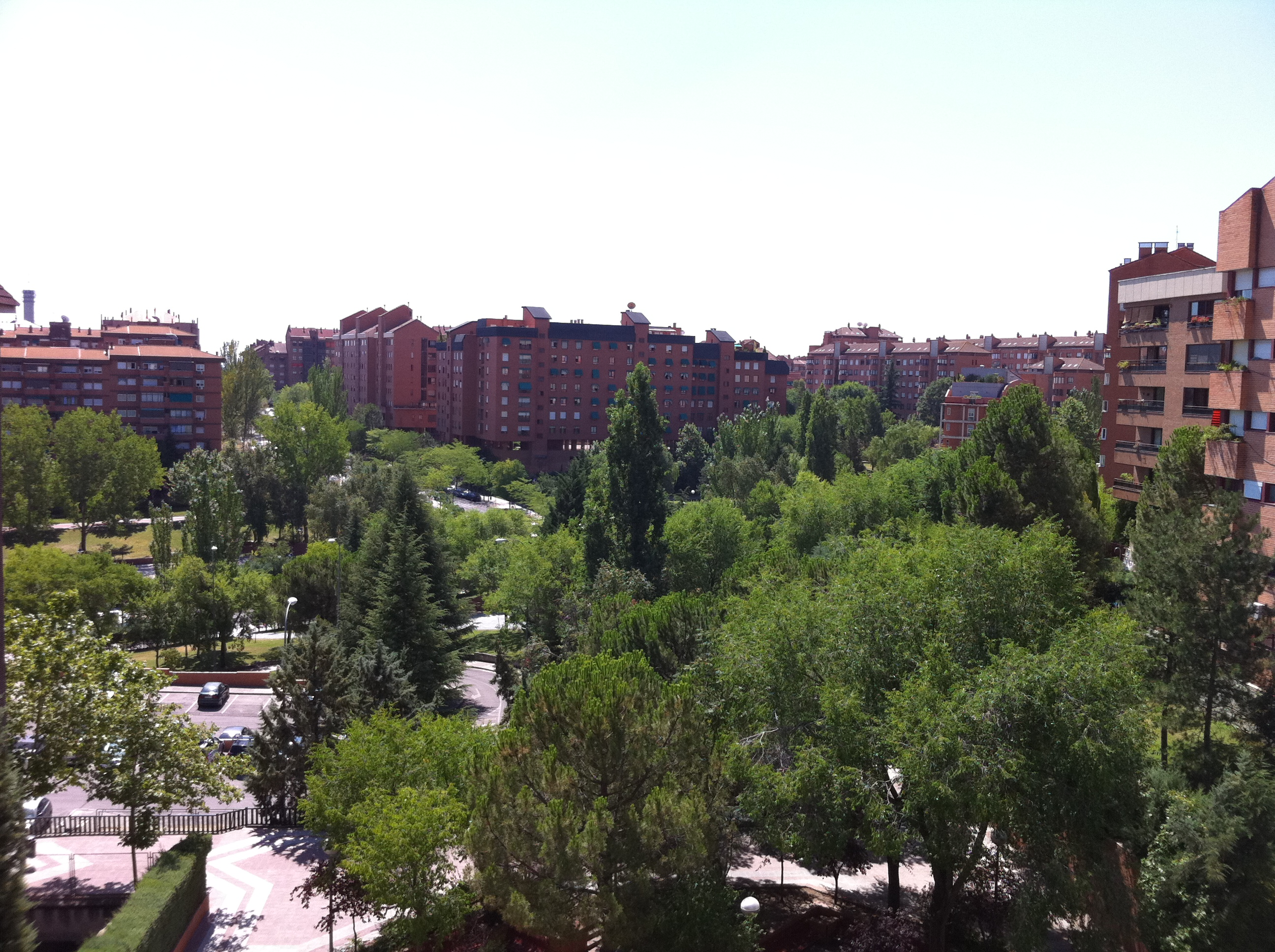

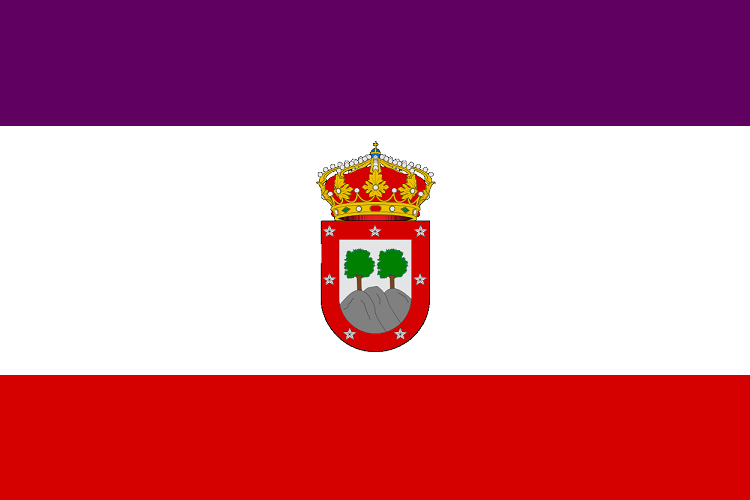
- Flag Coat of arms

- Location in Spain
- Coordinates: 40°35′58″N 3°42′42″W
- Country: Spain
- Autonomous community: Community of Madrid

Government
  - Mayor: Jesús Moreno García (PP)

Area
  - Total: 37.93 km^{2} (14.64 sq mi)
- Elevation: 710 m (2,330 ft)

Population (2025-01-01)
  - Total: 54,592
  - Density: 1,439/km^{2} (3,728/sq mi)
- Demonym: tricantino/tricantina(s)
- Time zone: UTC+1 (CET)
  - Summer (DST): UTC+2 (CEST)
- Postal code: 28760, 28761, 28790
- Website: www.trescantos.es

Tres Cantos (Spanish: [tɾes ˈkantos]) is a municipality of Spain located in the Community of Madrid.

Originally belonging to Colmenar Viejo, it seceded from the latter municipality in 1991, becoming the youngest municipality in the region. The urbanised area was conceived as a "satellite city" of Madrid developed by urban planners in the 1970s. It had a population of 48,326 inhabitants in 2020.

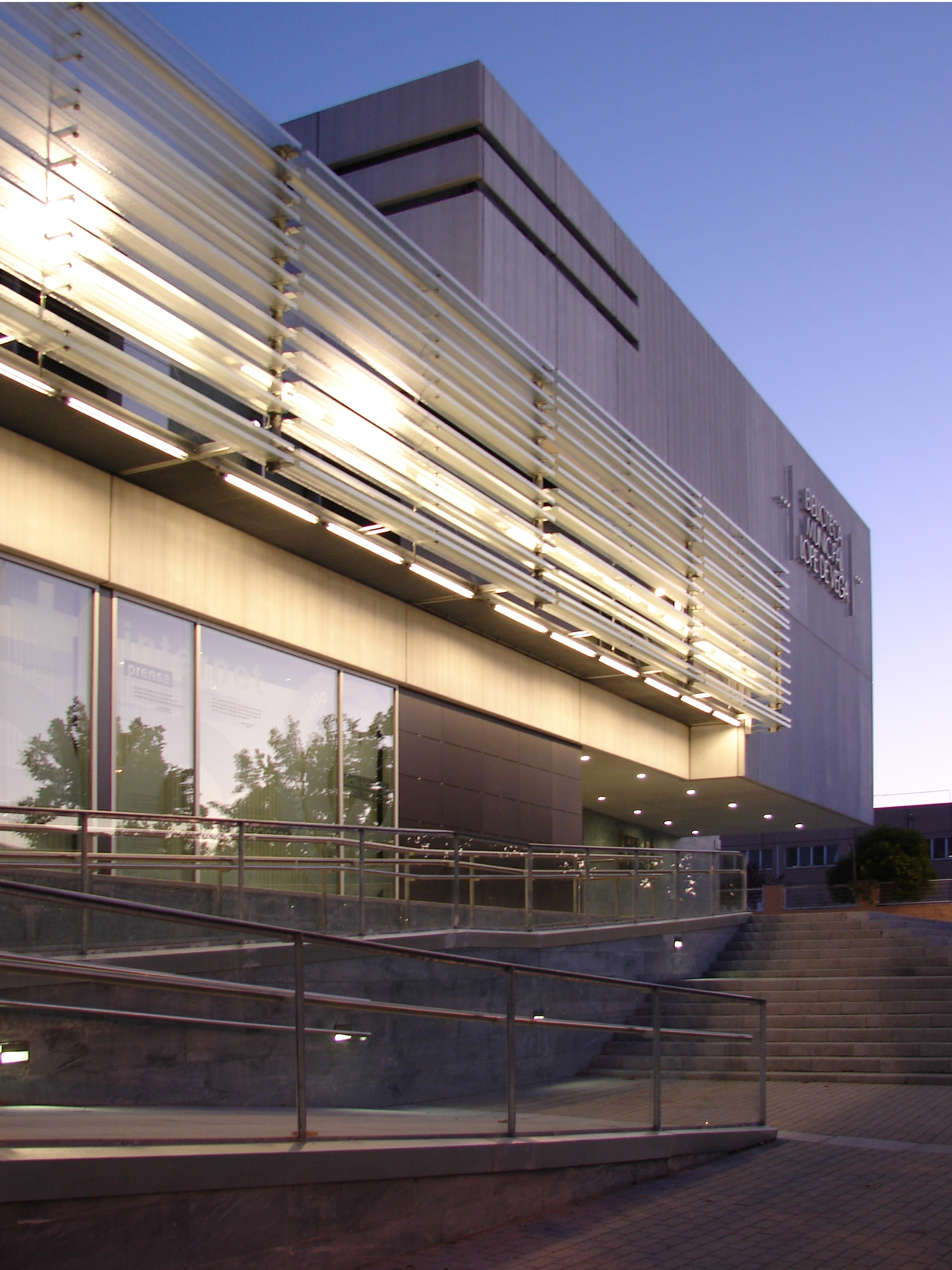
Biblioteca Municipal Public Library "Lope de Vega" de Tres Cantos (Madrid).15

The city, as other planned cities, has a distinctive structure. It consists of three phases and a newer development "Nuevo Tres Cantos". The two first phases are subdivided in sectors. Most sectors, especially in the first phase (North), include internally pedestrian public spaces, being surrounded by streets. The names of urban places are usually related to the sector in which they are located–for example, the Sector Océanos consists of five streets named after the five oceans.

The town hosts a number of Spanish headquarters of companies such as Siemens, Danone, Beiersdorf, advanced research at Merck, GSK, and a chapter of the Spanish High Committee of Scientific Research CSIC.

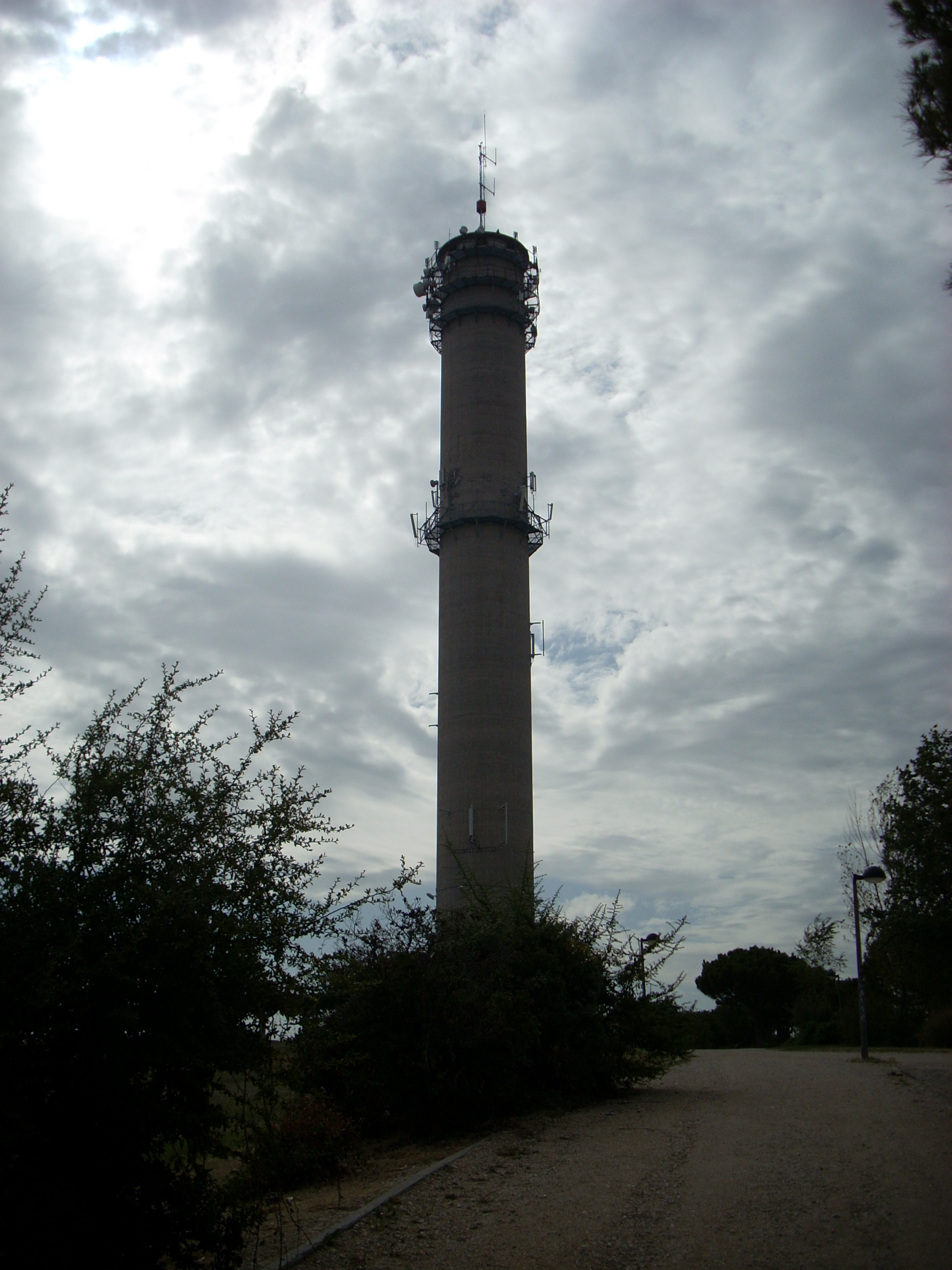
Torre del Agua, Tres Cantos

== History ==
In 1969 to 1973, Vicente Mortes, the Minister of Housing (Ministro de la Vivienda), commissioned by the dictator Francisco Franco, was the first to establish and develop the town over a rural area. This was not the Tres Cantos we know today, because it was the old version of it. Later on, they decided to regenerate the city, copying what some English cities did during those times. In 1976, the company “Tres Cantos S.A.” was created and which regenerated the city. It is one of the company's projects planned on paper. Residential occupation began from 1982.

A separatist party promoted the independence of Tres Cantos, obtaining support from the PSOE municipal councillors (with the opposition of the People's Party; PP), and thus, Tres Cantos seceded from Colmenar Viejo in 1991, becoming a standalone municipality. Despite the opposition to independence from the PP ranks, the municipality has eventually become a PP stronghold. Infrastructure development has continued apace, with a current (2005) 5-year development plan by local government authorities allowing for expansion of up to 60,000 inhabitants. The first mayor of Tres Cantos was Antonio Osuna with an 80% level of support from the population.

== Geography and location ==
Tres Cantos was built on former rural lands, about halfway from the northern outskirts of suburban Madrid to the Guadarrama mountain range, which are frequently snow-capped in winter. It lies in a slight valley formed with two eastwards-flowing creeks, bounded to the south by a higher plateau leading to Madrid, and to the west and north by more hilly terrain, which separates the area from the watershed of the Manzanares River. General elevation of the township is around 680 m, with a highest elevation within the municipality's borders of 730 m. The terrain rises towards the foothills of the Guadarrama range to the north and northwest, reaching elevations in excess of 800 m across the border in Colmenar Viejo. Within the urban area the terrain is gently undulating. It also an enormous new phase where there has been construction of new houses for new people for a long time. This new part of Tres Cantos is going to be named the Third Phase and is only composed of modern buildings and new houses for the city to expand.

The climate of Tres Cantos is typical for continental Spain. Summers are warm, with maximum temperatures of 33 °C which can sometimes reach the 39 °C. Night temperatures are more pleasant, because they decrease till 20 °C. There are cold winters, with minimum temperatures of 0 °C and below, and maximum temperatures of around 9 °C. Due to its geographical location, 22 kilometers from the capital, with its altitude and proximity to the mountains, the annual average precipitation is greater than in Madrid (above 500 mm).

== Demographics ==
In 2004 the residential population of Tres Cantos was 38,882 according to National Institute of Statistics (Instituto Nacional de Estadística, or INE) figures; however later estimates put the figure at around 45,000. Population growth has been in decline since the peak of the initial influx of residents in the early 1990s, however future plans for expansion are designed to cater for an eventual population of around 60,000.

A feature of Tres Cantos' demographic profile is the large proportion of young professionals (aged 45 and under) with children, compared to Madrid and the national average. This population structure reflects the nucleus of those who left the crowded confines of Madrid to settle in the new community of Tres Cantos in the 1980s and 1990s, resulting in a predominance of young, double-income and home-owning families of 2 to 3 children. Some 40% of the town's population are under 20 (almost double the national average), and less than 6% are over the age of 65 (considerably less than half the national average). The birth rate is also double the national average.

Some 10% of the population are foreign-born (extranjeros), with those from Latin American countries representing over half of these, and those from other European countries a further 33%. Again, many of the immigrant population are professionals employed by multinational companies in fields such as technology, who have settled in Spain after first arriving on work assignment, many of whom are married to Spanish nationals.

Educational accreditation among Tres Cantos inhabitants is also above the national average, with some 60% of prime income earners holding a tertiary qualification or higher. Average income levels reflect these education levels and professional employment opportunities, with over 55% having salaries in the upper-middle or higher income range. Many households have dual-incomes. Approximately 15% of households are classified as lower-middle and low-income households.

An overwhelming majority of the employed work in the services sector, either in Madrid or in Tres Cantos itself. A majority of working residents regularly commute to Madrid for work, with only about a quarter of the workforce having employment in Tres Cantos itself. Those who remain behind are joined by a daily influx of approximately 20,000 who commute from Madrid and its environs to Tres Cantos for work. Light and medium industries account for some 20% of employment in Tres Cantos, the construction sector providing a further 7.4%; a bare handful (0.2%) are employed in agriculture.

== Economy and industry ==
Tres Cantos' main economic activity is derived from the existence of various high-tech factories and headquarters in designated zones, including from the pharmaceutical, aerospace and computing industries.

A production hub of Netflix is also found here.

Approximately 20,000 employees from outside of Tres Cantos (predominantly Madrid) commute daily to work in its industrial zones its "Technological Park," home of cutting-edge companies in the aerospace industry, such as GMV Innovating Solutions. Other multinational corporations with offices and/or production in Tres Cantos are: Lucent Technologies, BP Solar, BDF Nivea, Nokia Siemens Networks, Samsonite, Altair, Hella, Siemens, Dannon, GMV, IFS and Sener Aeronáutica. The once largest cable provider in Spain, SOGECABLE, relocated here. The headquarters of both the Real Automóvil Club de España and the Spanish Metrology Centre (CEM) are located in Tres Cantos. The telecommunications and networking equipment manufacturer Teldat also has its headquarters in the municipality.

== Sister cities ==
Tres Cantos is a sister city to the planned cities of Columbia, Maryland, United States, Cergy-Pontoise, France and Nejapa, El Salvador.

== Transport system ==
Tres Cantos has variety of transport connections. Train transit connects Tres Cantos with cities as Parla, Alcobendas, San Sebastián de los Reyes, Colmenar Viejo and Madrid via C-4 transit. Buses that connect Tres Cantos to Plaza Castilla in Madrid city are 712, 713, 716, 717, and on the outskirts with lines 721, 722, 724, 725, 726 and 876. Bus that connects Tres Cantos with Colmenar Viejo (the nearest village) is 723. Tres Cantos also connects with Canillejas via Alcobendas, Autónoma university and airport via the 827 bus. Night service between Tres Cantos and Madrid are run every hour through the 701 bus, and on the outskirts with the line 702. Tres Cantos has also local bus routes through the different town districts ran by the L-1, L-2, L-3, L-4 and L-5 (this last one only weekends) buses.

== Sports clubs ==
- Unión Tres Cantos FS
- U.D Tres Cantos Islas
- F.C Base
- Tres Cantos C.D.E.
- Club Balonmano Tres Cantos
- Club Baloncesto Tres Cantos
- Tien 21 Uicesa Tres Cantos (futsal club)
- CEA TEAM C.F.
- Club Volleyball Tres Cantos
- Club de Rugby Tres Cantos
- Club Fútbol Americano Tres Cantos: Los Jabatos
- Club Atletismo grupo Oasis Tres Cantos
- Tres Cantos Patin Club . Inline Hockey
- Club inlineHockey Kamikazes

== Research ==
Researchers gave to the bacterium Delftia tsuruhatensis the name of the municipality where they work : "Tres Cantos 1" (TC1).
