= PC World (retailer) =

British chain of computer stores

- Type: Division
- Industry: Retail
- Founded: November 1991; 35 years ago in Croydon, London, England
- Founder: Jan Murray
- Defunct: March 2018; 8 years ago in Ayr, Scotland (last standalone store); October 5, 2021 (as Currys PC World – all stores to be rebranded as Currys)
- Fate: Merged with Currys (stores); Folded into Currys plc (brand)
- Successor: Currys PC World
- Headquarters: Acton, London, England
- Products: Computers; Games consoles; Computer hardware; Software; Office furniture
- Parent: Currys plc
- Website: PC World website at the Wayback Machine (archived 2019-07-16)

PC World was a British retail chain of mass market computer megastores. Established in November 1991, it became part of Dixons Retail in February 1993, and then part of Dixons Carphone, after the merger of Dixons Retail and Carphone Warehouse in August 2014.

During its final years, the company's remaining physical stores were within co-branded "Currys PC World" branches, although this was retired in October 2021, after which point the company became known simply as “Currys”.

== History ==
In November 1991, Vision Technology Group Ltd, led by Jan Murray, opened the first PC World shop in Purley Way, Croydon. Jan Murray attained an annual turnover of £50 million by April 1992, after he had opened the four largest flagship stores around London. In February 1993, when Dixons Group plc (now Currys plc) purchased the chain, there were four PC World shops in existence.

There followed a period of expansion, as more shops were opened across the country. This expansion was partly driven by a series of acquisitions, beginning with DN Computer Services in November 1996, followed by Byte Computer Superstores Ltd in April 1998, and MicroWarehouse in June 2004.

In November 1997, singer Gary Glitter took a laptop into a branch of PC World in Bristol for repair, where child abuse imagery was found by staff, who informed the police and Glitter was subsequently charged and found guilty of possessing child pornography. This conviction severely damaged Glitter's reputation, and effectively ended his career in the music business.

In September 2006, PC World UK assumed management control of its French subsidiary. In 2006, there were 163 PC World shops in the United Kingdom and Ireland. In the United Kingdom, PC World Business was launched in September 1997. Since March 2001, PC World Business has been based in Bury, Greater Manchester, and has its own management team.

In October 2006, PC World launched "The Connected Home", selling PC based home entertainment systems and installation services. During 2007 to 2008, PC World was due to undergo a style change, with a proposed new logo, staff uniforms, shop layouts, as part of its image re branding programme. The changes were trialled at branches in Brentford, Colchester, Portsmouth, Bournemouth, Southampton, Isle of Wight, Enfield, Burnley and North Shields.

On 13 December 2007, it was announced that PC World would begin selling Dell PCs in their shops. This was one of many moves Dell made to sell their desktops and laptops to a wider market. This also includes Dell selling their XPS systems in many HMV shops across the United Kingdom.

In August 2008, the "proposed" logo was shelved, in favour of a new logo. In December 2008, PC World reported its first ever loss, posting underlying losses of £29.8 million in the six months to October 2008, compared to a £52.4 million profit in 2007.

=== Merge with Currys ===
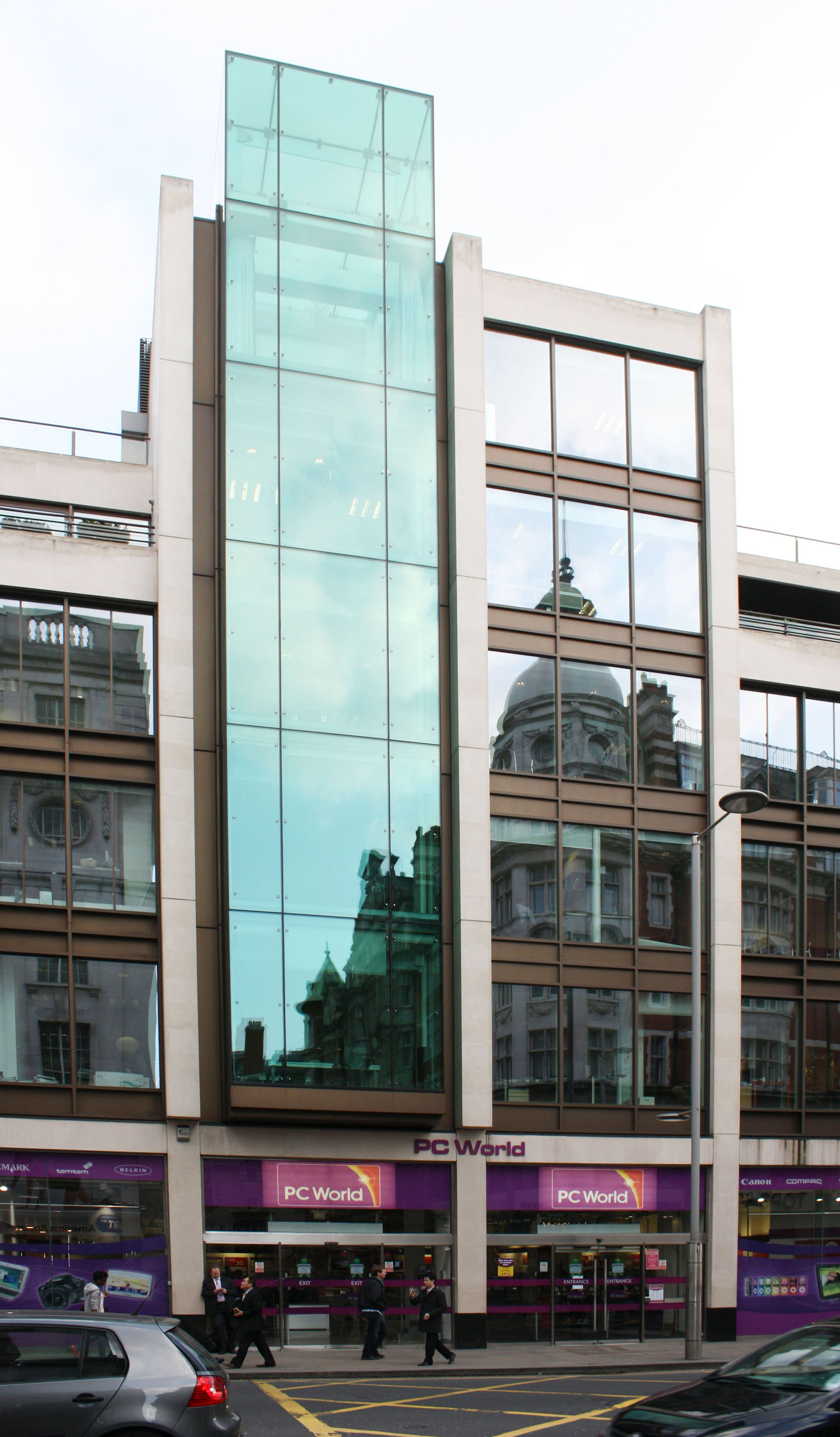
PC World, Kensington High Street, London, (2010)

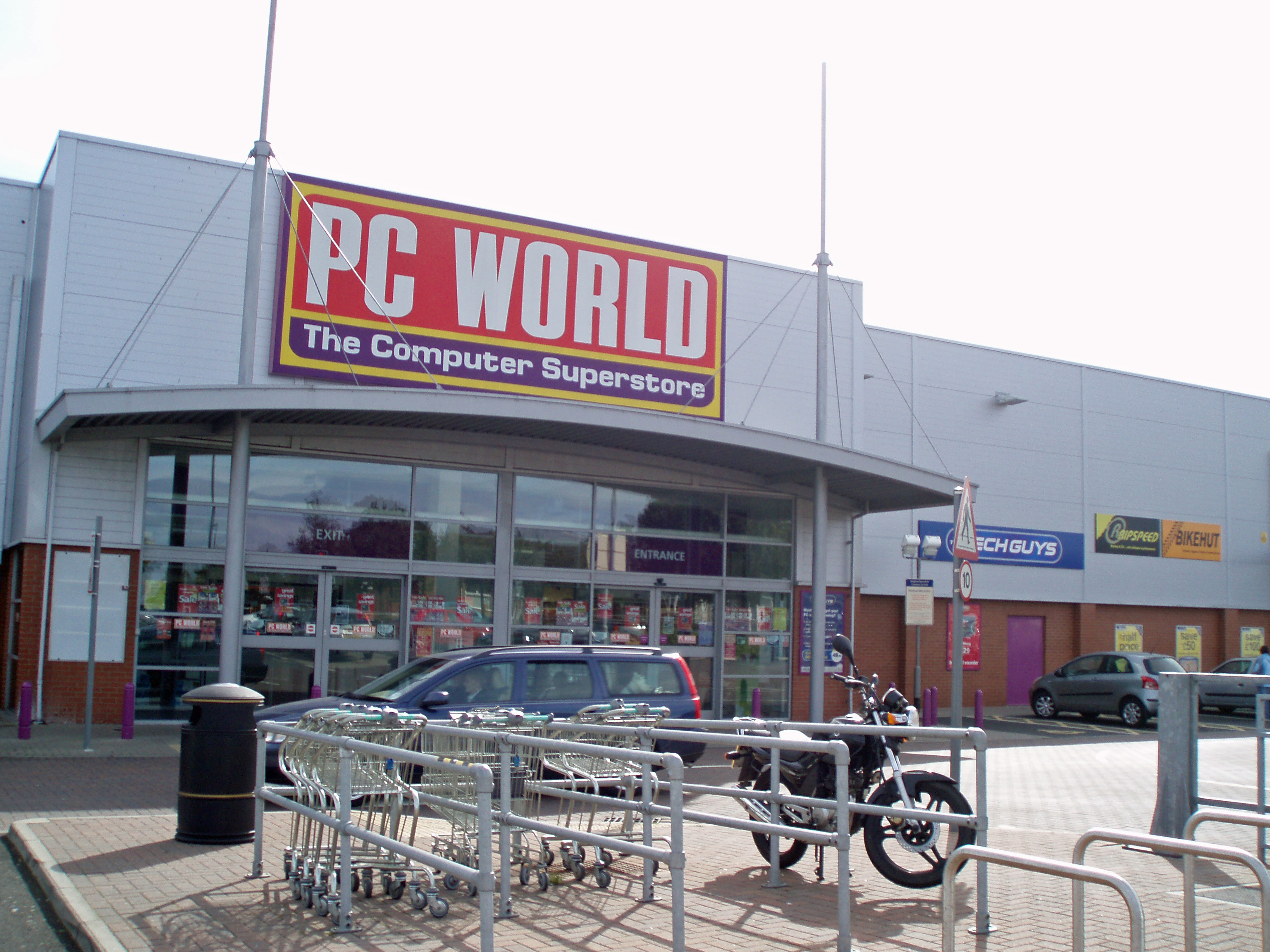
PC World, Kingston Park, (2007). The shop carries the previous logo. (2000 to 2008)

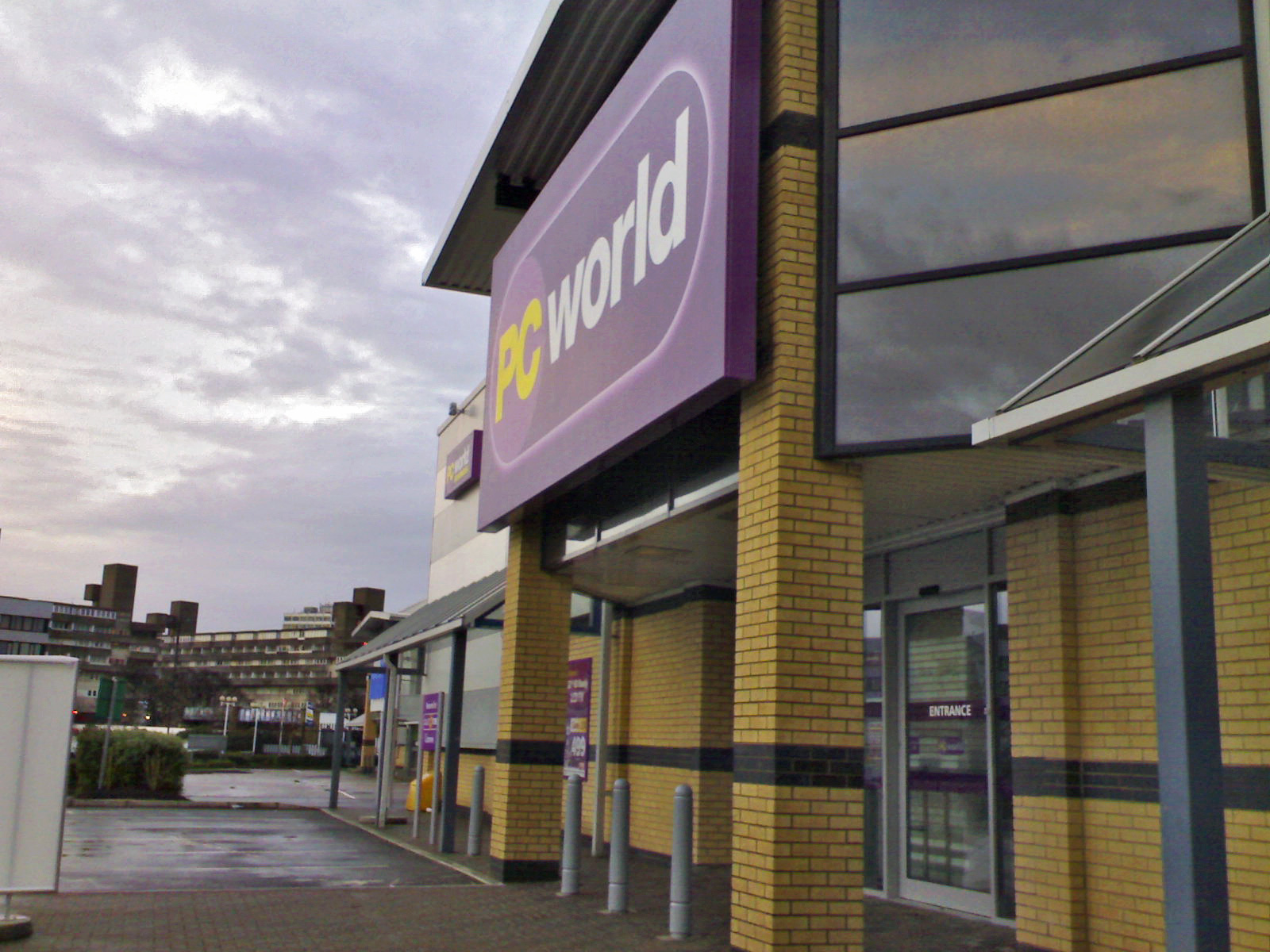
Outside Southampton Central PC World (December 2006). The shop carries the proposed "new" logo. (This was not rolled out, and a different design was later chosen.)

PC World opened their first two in one megastore with Currys at Wandsworth Bridge, Fulham, on 29 October 2009. This megastore closed permanently in 2022, and was demolished in 2023. This was followed by Merry Hill Shopping Centre (West Midlands), Aintree (Merseyside) Teesside Park (Stockton-on-Tees) and Bridge of Dee (Aberdeen) in June and July 2010. PC World closed their last remaining standalone shop in Ayr, in the week commencing 26 March 2018.

PC World's website was merged into Currys in July 2019, resulting in the end of PC World as the separate retailer.

Dixons Carphone announced they will rebrand as Currys plc in September 2021, dropping the PC World from the Currys name. The change also replaced Team Knowhow and Carphone Warehouse brands within the existing Currys brand. This resulted in the end of the PC World name after 29 years.

== Criticisms ==
In February 2005, PC World attracted criticism, for the strong promotion of extended warranties (also known as insurance and support packages).

An internet survey by Which? in June 2004 ranked PC World joint last for customer satisfaction. In March 2006, PC World attempted to get away from its reputation for having sales staff on up to 20% commission, who would therefore use high pressure sales tactics with its "One Team" marketing campaign.

The bonus was also based on other non monetary metrics, such as customer satisfaction. To compensate the 275 highest earners under the old scheme for reduced bonuses, their basic pay was raised by 16% from around £11,000 to around £13,000 per year.

In December 2007, in a response to the perception that PC World staff are often young, and lacking in knowledge and communications skills, a set of e-learning courses called "The Power of Knowledge" were completed by 6,000 staff. The results were incorporated into their Christmas bonuses, as an incentive for staff to improve their knowledge.

Another survey for Which? in January 2008 revealed that PC World was ranked in the bottom ten retailers in the United Kingdom. In June 2014, Which? also reported PC World overcharging for repairs, and lack of technical competence among technicians. This was from seven sampled shops.

In May 2013, if an extended warranty was not purchased, customers were required to use outsourced, local rate telephone support for hardware issues or premium rate telephone lines (£1/minute, except for set up which was 75p/minute) for software issues.

In June 2014, the BBC's consumer awareness programme Watchdog found that PC World was accused of misselling HDMI cables in 9 out of 15 test purchases, claiming that the more you pay the better the quality, which was a false statement.

== Controversies ==
In January 2006, after complaints, PC World was forced to remove an advert, that gave misinformation about wireless networking. There have also been countless other complaints over adverts, particularly regarding goods advertised, but not actually available in the shops.

In September 2007, a customer alleged that when he returned a laptop under warranty with a faulty hinge, PC World refused to honour their warranty because he had installed a Linux operating system on the laptop, and therefore had invalidated the warranty he had had on the product, although the fault was a hardware matter and would not have been affected by the operating system installed.

In September 2009, PC World staff were investigated for posting abusive and offensive comments about customers on Facebook.

== International ==
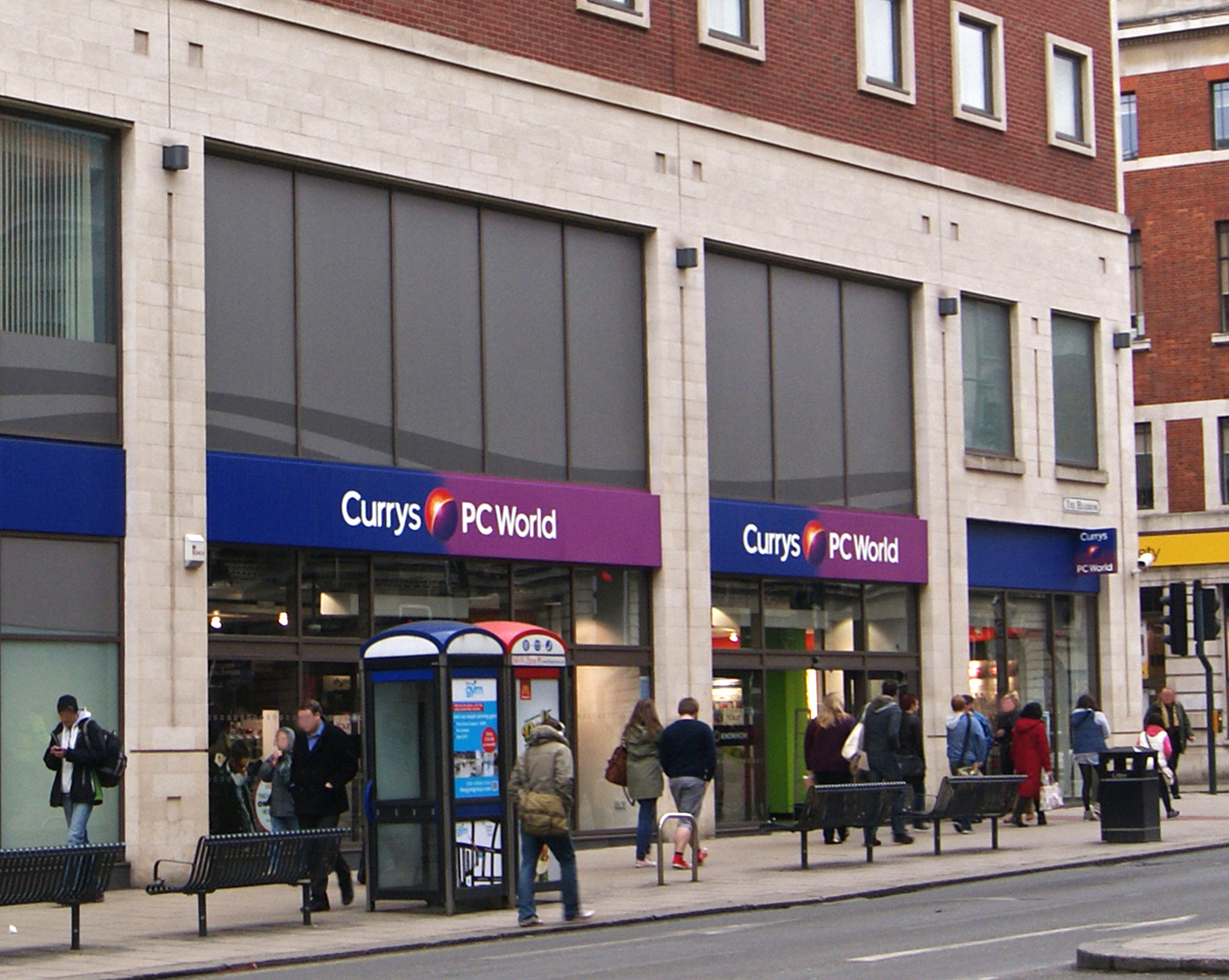
A combined Currys PC World was created here, on the Headrow, Leeds. This was when the Currys branch on Briggate was relocated within this PC World. (2013)

PC World traded only in the United Kingdom and Ireland. It previously also traded in other European countries, but were disposed as the parent company refocussed. The European shops traded under the name PC City. In February 2007, the French shops were the first of the Mainland Europe shops to be closed down.

In April 2009, the Swedish shops were closed down, and the online operation then switched to the ElectroWorld brand. 34 shops in Spain also operated under the brand PC City. In April 2011, however, all Spanish shops were closed, as part of Dixons Retail's withdrawal from the market in Spain.

== See also ==
- Dixons
- The Link
