= Church of la Asunción de Nuestra Señora =

Cultural property in Algete, Spain

- Iglesia de la Asunción de Nuestra Señora (Spanish)
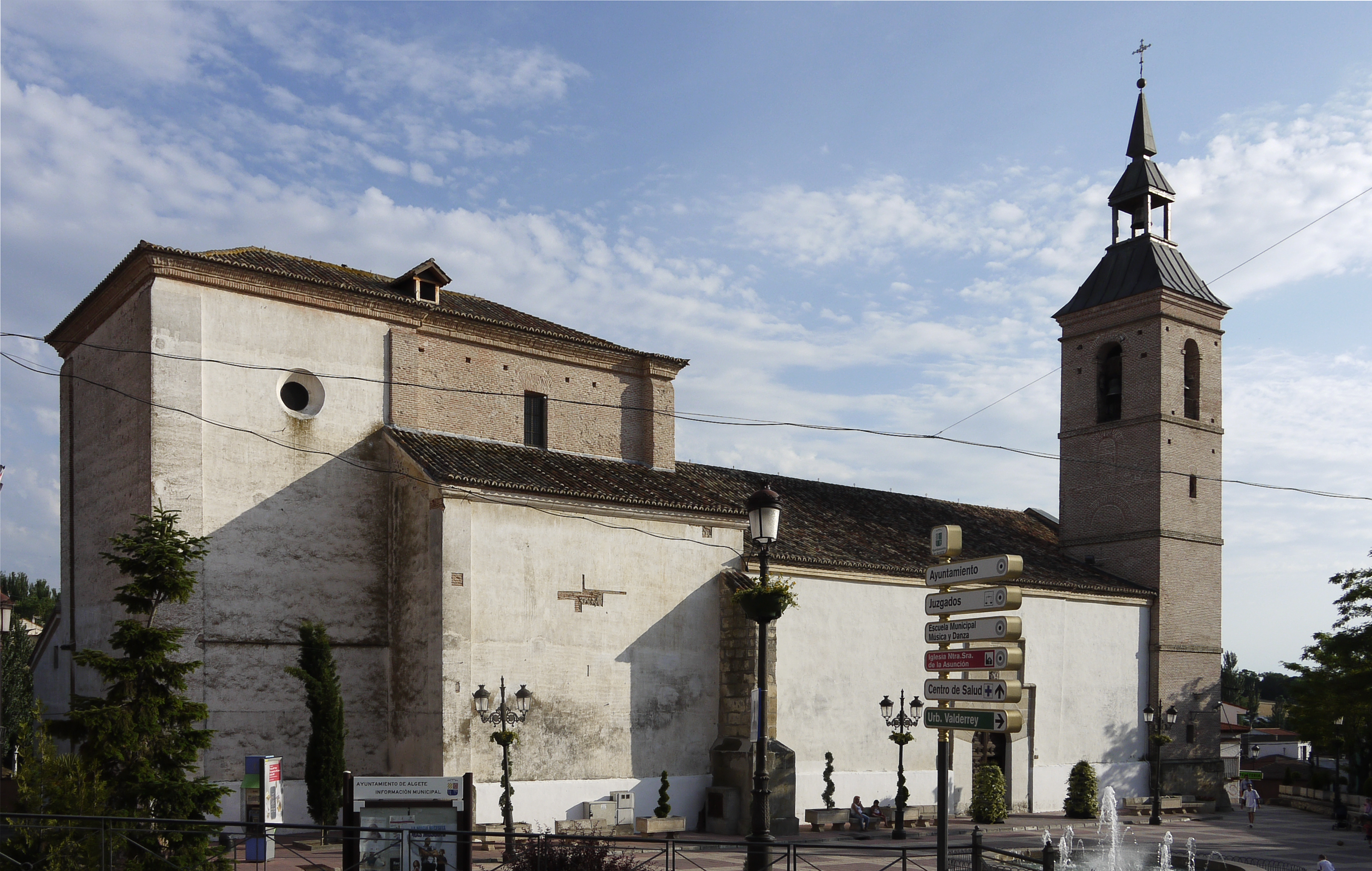

- Location within Spain
- 40.595883°N 3.497569°W
- Location: Algete, Spain

Spanish Cultural Heritage
- Official name: Iglesia de la Asunción de Nuestra Señora
- Type: Non-movable
- Criteria: Monument
- Designated: 2001
- Reference no.: RI-51-0010109

The Church of la Asunción de Nuestra Señora (Spanish: Iglesia de la Asunción de Nuestra Señora) is a church located in Algete, Spain. It was declared Bien de Interés Cultural in the Spanish heritage register in 2001.
