= PC City =

- Company type: Part of Dixons Carphone
- Industry: Retail
- Founded: 1991
- Defunct: 2013
- Headquarters: Hemel Hempstead (United Kingdom)
- Products: Information Technology
- Revenue: n/a (see Dixons Carphone for group revenue.)

PC City was a chain of computer superstores owned and run by Dixons Carphone. Established in 1991, it was a continental European equivalent to the PC World brand, which operated in the United Kingdom and Ireland.

PC City had stores in several countries:

- Sweden – The physical stores closed in 2009. The online outlet switched to the Electro World brand in August 2013.
- France – All nine stores closed in February 2007.
- Spain – The chain closed all 34 stores in April 2011. Most of the stores were sold to Worten.
- Italy – The business was combined with Unieuro, which was merged with Marco Polo in October 2013.
