= Navalafuente =

- Municipality
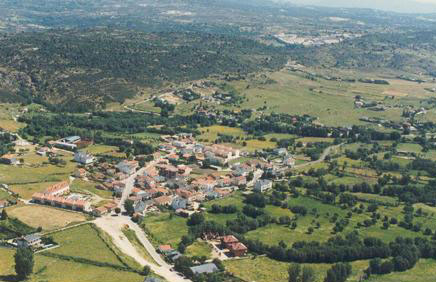

- Flag Coat of arms

- Location in Spain
- Country: Spain
- Region: Community of Madrid

Area
  - Total: 11.75 km^{2} (4.54 sq mi)
- Elevation: 909 m (2,982 ft)

Population (2025-01-01)
  - Total: 1,693
  - Density: 144.1/km^{2} (373.2/sq mi)
- Time zone: UTC+1 (CET)
  - Summer (DST): UTC+2 (CEST)

Navalafuente (Spanish pronunciation: [naβalaˈfwente]) is a municipality of the Community of Madrid, Spain. The municipality covers an area of 11.75 km^{2}. It lies at 909 metres above sea level. As of 2018, it has a population of 1,397.

== Bus ==
- 726: Navalafuente - Guadalix - Madrid (Plaza de Castilla)
