= Jan Murray (entrepreneur) =

British born technology entrepreneur

Jan Andrew Murray
- Born: March 1948 (age 77); United Kingdom
- Occupation: Entrepreneur
- Known for: Founding British retailer PC World

Jan Murray is a British-born technology entrepreneur best known for founding PC World Plc, the first computer superstore chain outside the United States.

== Career ==
In 1967, Murray entered the family business REW Audio Visual Plc and served as joint managing director from 1975 to 1979. He went on to sell the company to Thorn-EMI Plc for £3.5 million in 1979 and held the position of divisional director until 1982. In 1982, Murray founded Vision Technology Group Plc, which grew to become the largest mail-order computer supplier in the United Kingdom, with an annual turnover of £35 million.

In November 1991, Murray founded PC World, marking the inception of the first computer superstore chain outside the United States. Within twenty-four months of its establishment, Murray had opened the four largest flagship stores around London, attaining an annual turnover of £50 million by April 1992.

Murray sold PC World Plc, together with Vision Technology Group Plc, to Dixons Group Plc for £9 million in February 1993. In 1995, he founded Internet Technology Group Plc, an internet service provider formed to offer high speed connections to business customers and the general public.

He sold Internet Technology Group Plc to Concentric Corp. (Nasdaq.CNCX)/Nexlink Corporation (Nasdaq.NXLK) for $250 million in September 1999; the largest sale of an independent ISP in the United Kingdom. Since 2000, Murray has invested in technology start ups via investment vehicle Nebula Associates Ltd. In 2005, he acquired 25% of Skyguard Technology Ltd, a lone worker protection provider.

He went on to form the Send For Help Group, which acquired Skyguard in March 2010. The Send For Help Group purchased Guardian24 in December 2014, which led the group to become the largest lone worker protection service in the world, with a combined subscriber base of over 100,000 users. Murray featured in the Sunday Times Rich List in 2009, ranking at number #1,284.
