= Bustarviejo =

- Municipality
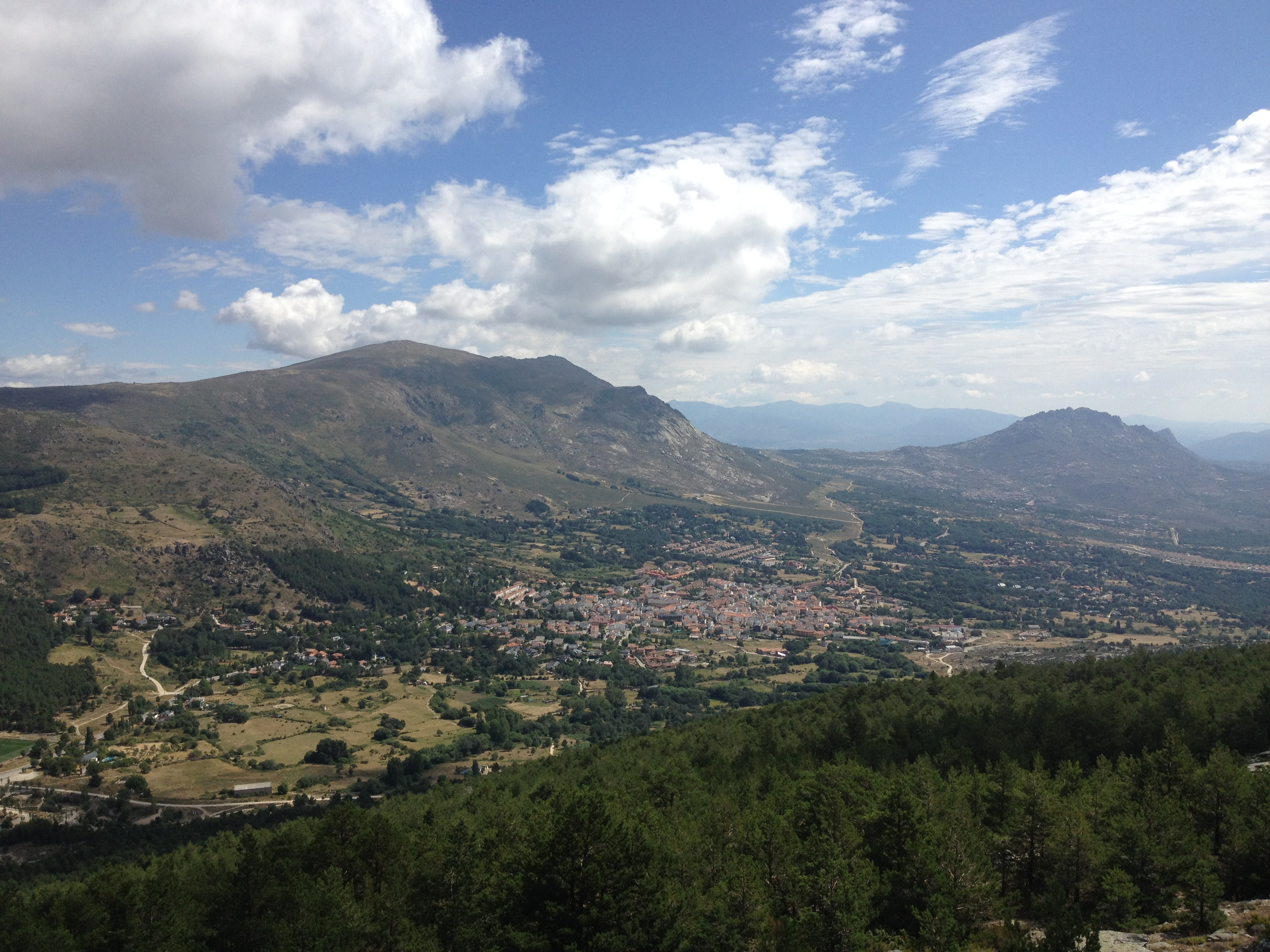

- Flag Coat of arms

- Municipal location within the Community of Madrid.
- Coordinates: 40°51′N 3°42′W
- Country: Spain
- Autonomous community: Community of Madrid

Area
  - Total: 21.73 sq mi (56.29 km^{2})
- Elevation: 4,009 ft (1,222 m)

Population (2025-01-01)
  - Total: 2,870
- Time zone: UTC+1 (CET)
  - Summer (DST): UTC+2 (CEST)

Bustarviejo (Spanish pronunciation: [bustaɾˈβjexo]) is a municipality of the autonomous community of Madrid in central Spain. It belongs to the comarca of Sierra Norte.

== Bus ==
Line 725 from Interbus arrives to the village, connecting it to Plaza de Castilla in Madrid, along with other villages. Some services also arrive to the nearby Valdemanco. Until 2011, the village was connected by train with Bustarviejo-Valdemanco station (despite being considerably far from the village), station as, which its name indicates, was shared with Valdemanco, but due to a detachment on the line, no more trains are going through the village.
