= Valdemanco =

Coordinates: 40°52′N 3°39′W

- Municipality
- Flag Coat of arms

- Municipal location within the Community of Madrid.
- Country: Spain
- Autonomous community: Community of Madrid

Population (2025-01-01)
  - Total: 1,097
- Time zone: UTC+1 (CET)
  - Summer (DST): UTC+2 (CEST)

Valdemanco is a municipality of the Community of Madrid, Spain.

== Transport ==
A few buses from line 725 of Interbus extend their journey from the nearby Bustarviejo to this village. Also, few services from lines 197B and 197C of ALSA connects the village with others of the surroundings. Until 2011, the village had two train stations: Bustarviejo-Valdemanco and Valdemanco, but due to a detachment in the line, no more trains are going through the village.
