= Braojos =

- Municipality
- Flag Coat of arms

- Municipal location within the Community of Madrid.

- Location in Spain Braojos (Spain)
- Coordinates: 41°02′N 3°38′W
- Country: Spain
- Autonomous community: Community of Madrid

Area
  - Total: 9.7 sq mi (25 km^{2})
- Elevation: 3,911 ft (1,192 m)

Population (2025-01-01)
  - Total: 233
  - Density: 24/sq mi (9.3/km^{2})
- Time zone: UTC+1 (CET)
  - Summer (DST): UTC+2 (CEST)

Braojos (Spanish pronunciation: [bɾaˈoxos]) is a municipality of the autonomous community of Madrid in central Spain. It is located in the comarca of Sierra Norte.

== Public transport ==
Braojos only has two bus lines, one of them connecting it to Madrid although it only makes a single trip daily. Those lines are:

195: Madrid - Braojos

191A: Buitrago - Braojos
