= Rascafría =

- Municipality
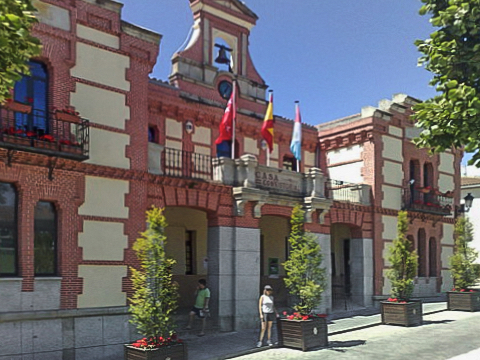
- Town Hall.

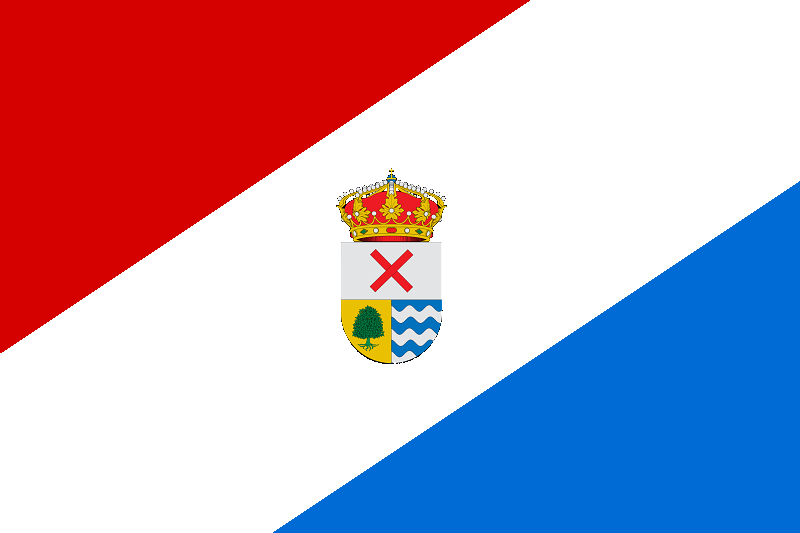
- Flag Coat of arms

- Municipal location within the Community of Madrid.

- Location in the Community of Madrid Location in Spain
- Coordinates: 40°54′17″N 3°52′46″W
- Country: Spain
- Autonomous community: Community of Madrid
- Province: Madrid

Government
  - Mayor: Óscar Joaquín Robles Hernández (Vox)

Area
  - Total: 150.27 km^{2} (58.02 sq mi)
- Elevation: 1,163 m (3,816 ft)

Population (2025-01-01)
  - Total: 1,704
  - Density: 11.34/km^{2} (29.37/sq mi)
- Demonym: Rascafrienses
- Time zone: UTC+1 (CET)
  - Summer (DST): UTC+2 (CEST)
- Postal code: 28740
- Website: www.rascafria.org

Rascafría is a municipality of the Community of Madrid, Spain. In 2024 it had a population of 1,707.

In its territory is the Monastery of Santa Maria de El Paular and the hamlet of Oteruelo del Valle.

== Politics ==
The 2023 election was won by Vox: in Rascafría the PP, as well as local parties AVRO and SRO, suffered a drop in support, with Vox and PSOE both benefitting. The municipality has a Vox mayor, Óscar Robes, and rules in coalition with the PP.

Party	Votes	%	+/-	Seats	+/-
Vox	298	31.26	New	3	New
PP	184	19.30	▼11.15	2	▼1
PSOE	173	18.15	▲6.05	2	▲1
Agrupación Vecinal por Rascafría y Oteruelo	142	14.90	▼15.99	1	▼2
Somos Rascafría-Oteruelo	88	9.23	▼13.34	1	▼1
Rascafría Entre Todos	40	4.19	New	0	New
IU/Podemos/AV	20	2.09	▼0.18	0	0

== Transport system ==
The only way to reach Rascafría is on bus lines 194 and 194A.
