= La Acebeda =

- Municipality
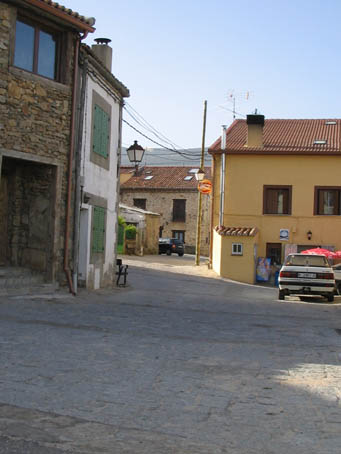

- Flag Coat of arms

- Municipal location within the Community of Madrid.

- Location in Spain
- Coordinates: 41°04′59″N 3°37′0″W
- Country: Spain
- Autonomous community: Community of Madrid

Government
  - Mayor: Gustavo Martín Hidalgo (Concejo Abierto)

Area
  - Total: 22.06 km^{2} (8.52 sq mi)

Population (2025)
  - Total: 70
  - Density: 3.2/km^{2} (8.2/sq mi)
- Time zone: UTC+1 (CET)
  - Summer (DST): UTC+2 (CEST)

La Acebeda (Spanish pronunciation: [la aθeˈβeða]) is a village and municipality in the autonomous community of the Community of Madrid in central Spain, located about 75 kilometres (47 mi) north of Madrid. It has 70 inhabitants.

== Demographics ==
As of 2025, the population is 70, of which 55.7% are males, and 44.3% are females. Minors make up 4.3% of the population, and seniors make up 51.4%.

Historical population

Year	Pop.	±%
1842	310	—
1857	350	+12.9%
1877	332	−5.1%
1887	321	−3.3%
1900	289	−10.0%
1910	342	+18.3%
1920	306	−10.5%
1930	340	+11.1%
1940	334	−1.8%

Year	Pop.	±%
1950	310	−7.2%
1960	206	−33.5%
1970	114	−44.7%
1981	70	−38.6%
1991	55	−21.4%
2001	51	−7.3%
2011	66	+29.4%
2021	55	−16.7%

Source: INE

=== Immigration ===
As of 2025, immigrants make up 8.6% of the population. The foreign countries of birth are Colombia, France, and Bolivia.

== Politics ==
Since the 2023 elections, the area has been run by a local party, Consejo Abierto La Acebeda. Before that, the area was run by a Ciudadanos administration. The municipality has three seats.

Party	Votes	%	+/-	Seats	+/-
Consejo Abierto La Acebeda	30	83.33	New	2	New
PSOE	5	30.87	▲30.87	1	▲1
Vox	1	2.7	New	0	New
PP	0	0	▼45.07	0	▼1

== Public transport ==
La Acebeda has two bus lines. One of them communicates with Madrid although it only works on weekends. Those lines are:

196: Madrid - La Acebeda

191B: Buitrago - Somosierra
