= El Vellón =

Coordinates: 40°46′N 3°35′W

- Municipality
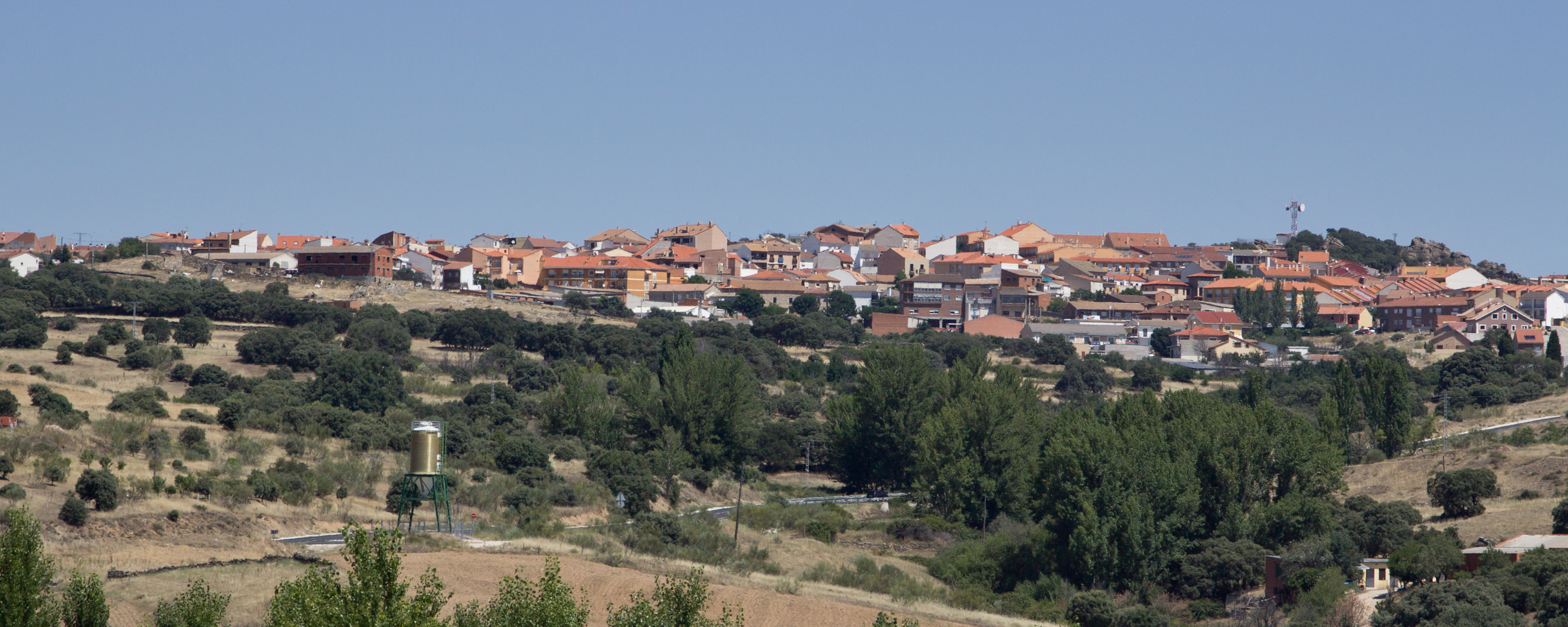
- Panorama of El Vellón

- Flag Coat of arms

- Municipal location within the Community of Madrid.
- Country: Spain
- Autonomous community: Community of Madrid

Government
  - Mayor: Catalina Llorente Fernández (PSOE)

Area
  - Total: 13.18 sq mi (34.14 km^{2})

Population (2025-01-01)
  - Total: 2,281
- Time zone: UTC+1 (CET)
  - Summer (DST): UTC+2 (CEST)

El Vellón is a municipality of the Community of Madrid, Spain. It is known for the Watchtower of El Vellón.

== Politics ==
The municipality is considered a PSOE stronghold. The party has a majority in the eleven-seat government. The mayor is Catalina Llorente Fernández.

Party	Votes	%	+/-	Seats	+/-
PSOE	500	50.96	▼14.8	6	0
PP	349	35.57	4.3	4	1
Vox	122	12.43	New	1	▲1

== Transport system ==
El Vellón has three line buses, all of them operated by ALSA. Two of them connect the village with Madrid. These lines are:

Line 191: Madrid (Plaza de Castilla) - Buitrago

Line 193: Madrid (Plaza de Castilla) - Pedrezuela - El Vellón

Line 197D: Torrelaguna - El Vellón - El Molar
