= Buitrago del Lozoya =

- Municipality
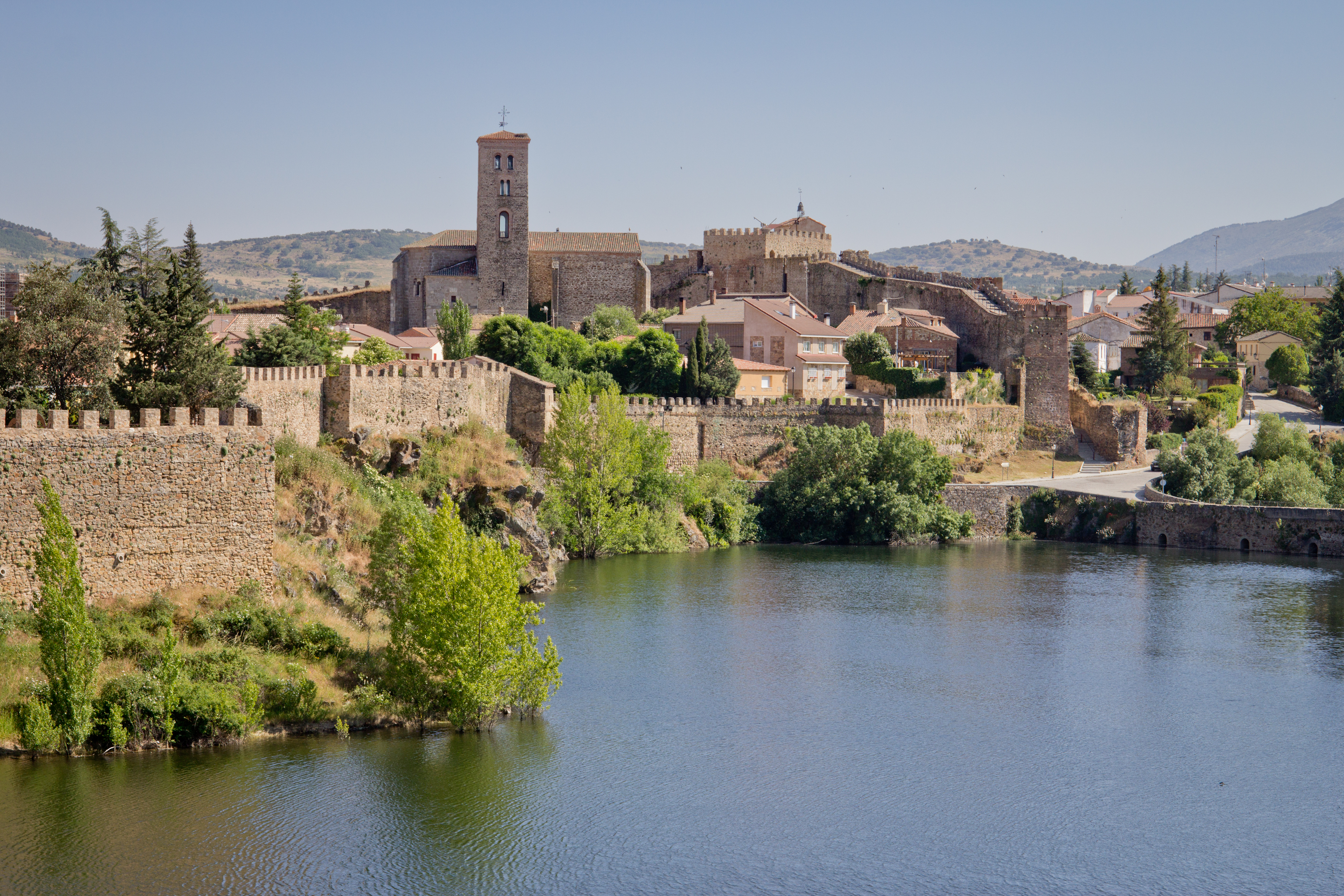

- Flag Coat of arms

- Location of Buitrago del Lozoya in the autonomous community of Madrid

- Location in Spain
- Coordinates: 40°59′31″N 3°38′20″W
- Country: Spain
- Autonomous community: Community of Madrid
- Province: Madrid
- Comarca: Sierra Norte (Madrid)

Government
  - Mayor: Tomás Fernández

Area
  - Total: 26.5 km^{2} (10.2 sq mi)
- Elevation: 975 m (3,199 ft)

Population (2025-01-01)
  - Total: 2,034
  - Density: 76.8/km^{2} (199/sq mi)
- Demonym: Buitragueños
- Time zone: UTC+1 (CET)
  - Summer (DST): UTC+2 (CEST)
- Postal code: 28730

Buitrago del Lozoya (Spanish pronunciation: [bwiˈtɾaɣo ðel loˈθoʝa]) is a municipality of the autonomous community of Madrid in central Spain. It belongs to the comarca of Sierra Norte. The town is one of the few in the community that have maintained its walls, which are of Moorish origin (11th century) and were restored in the 15th century. It lies on a peninsula surrounded by the Lozoya river.

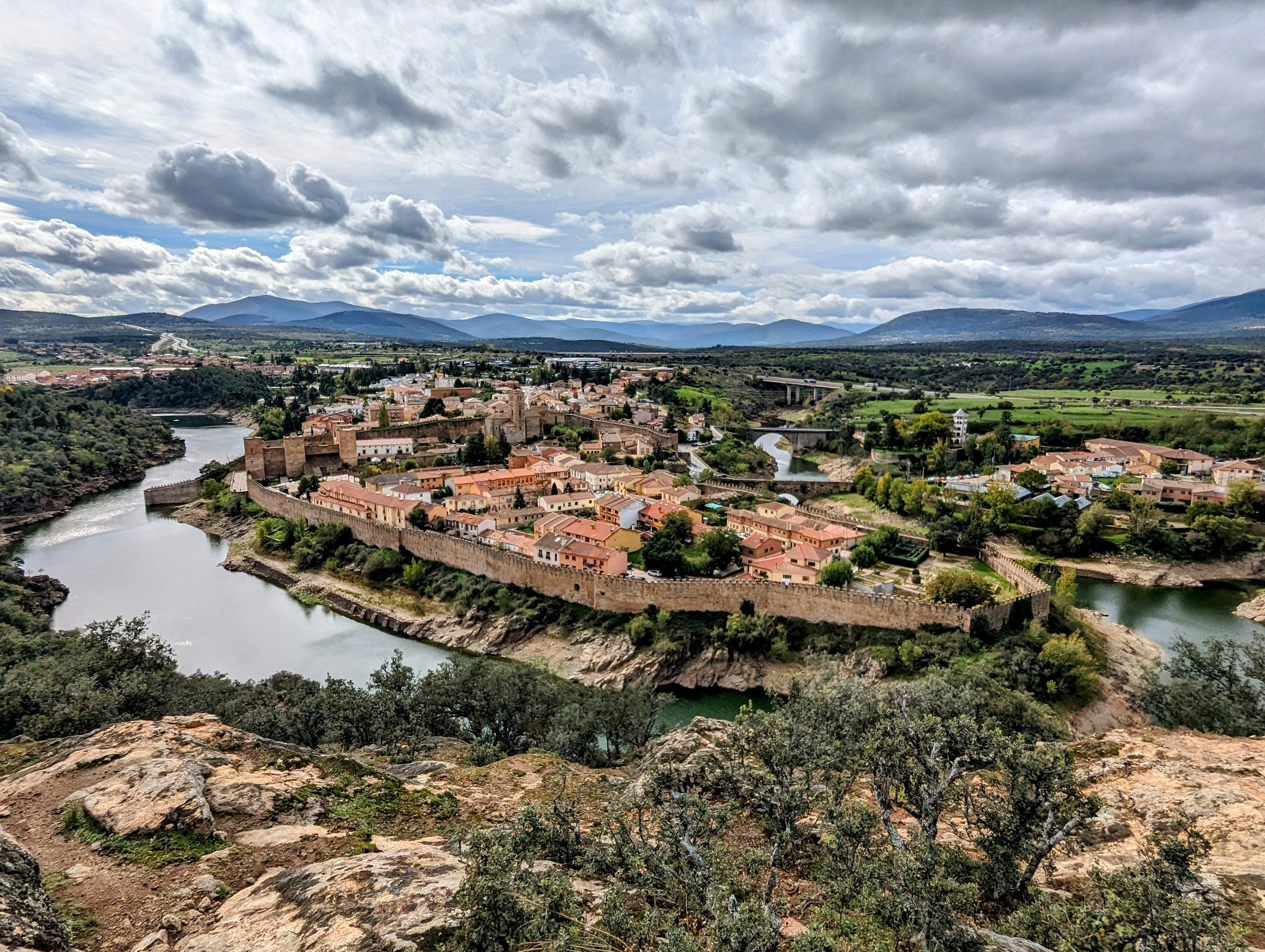
Panoramic view of the town

Other sights include:

- Buitrago del Lozoya Castle, a Gothic-Mudéjar structure dating from the 15th century, with rectangular plan
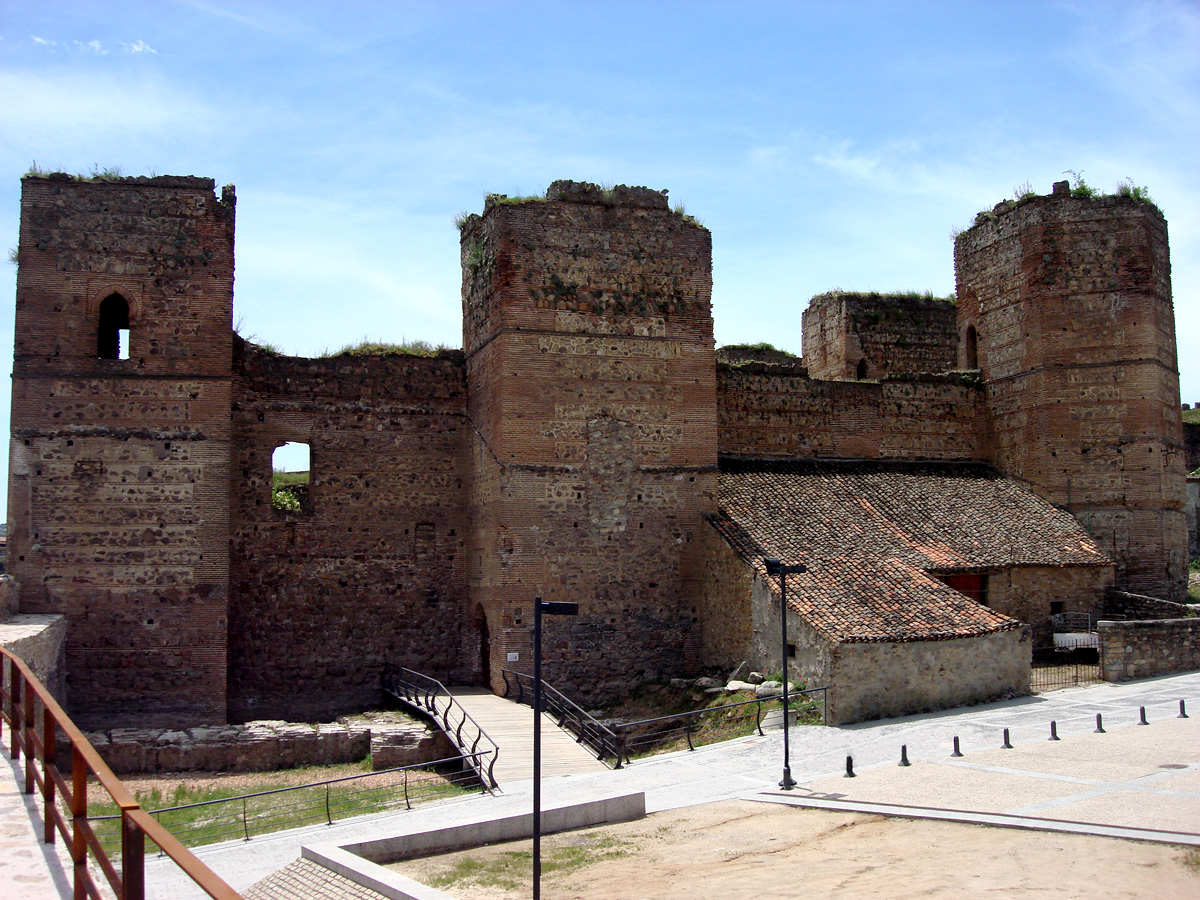
  Buitrago del Lozoya castle
- the church of Santa María del Castillo (1321), in the same style
- the Picasso Museum. This small museum contains works by Pablo Picasso from the collection of Eugenio Arias. Arias, a barber by profession, came from Buitrago and was a friend of the artist.

== Symbol ==
The seal and flag that represents the municipality were approved on February 13, 2020.

== Geography ==
The town of Buitrago del Lozoya historically occupied a strategic position in the region as it enabled control of the route from the north through the Somosierra, a mountain pass in the Sierra de Guadarrama, and then along the valley of the Madarquillos river. It is surrounded on all sides except to the south by the river Lozoya, providing protection with a natural moat. To the west is the Riosequillo reservoir and to the east the Puentes Viejas reservoir.

The presence of a number of drovers' roads (and in particular, the royal Segovian drover's road) through or near the town highlights its importance in the Middle Ages.

The A-1 (autovía) passes close to the west of the town. Access is from junction 74 to the south of the town and junctions 75 & 76 to the north.

== History ==
The oldest historical references to Buitrago date back to the 1st century BC. according to Livy it was the Licabrum conquered by Gaius Flaminius, although most historians relate it to Cabra. With Talamanca de Jarama, Buitrago was made in the Umayyad period as a fortress protecting the route northwards from Toledo to the Pass of Somosierra. It was captured by Alfonso VI in 1085 as a preparation for taking Toledo. The town was provided with a new Christian population in 1169 and became property of the church of Toledo.

Because of the strategic value of Buitrago, King Alfonso VI of León and Castile bestowed a privilege on the town, authorising the increase of the population of the existing neighbourhoods and the creation of new ones. In 1096 the king granted a coat of arms to the town. The arms consist of an escutcheon (i.e., shield) containing a bull and a holm oak, topped by a crown with the motto Ad alenda pecora (For the feeding of the cattle).

The oldest part of the town is known as La Villa and is the highest area of the walled part of the town. The growth in population drove the creation of two neighbourhoods outside the walls; one to the south called San Juan and the other to the north, on the other bank of the river, called Andarrío. This urban structure, consolidated in the middle-ages, has been maintained to the present day.

Occupying a significant position in La Villa is the church of Santa María del Castillo, the only one that still exists of the four in La Villa from the 16th century.

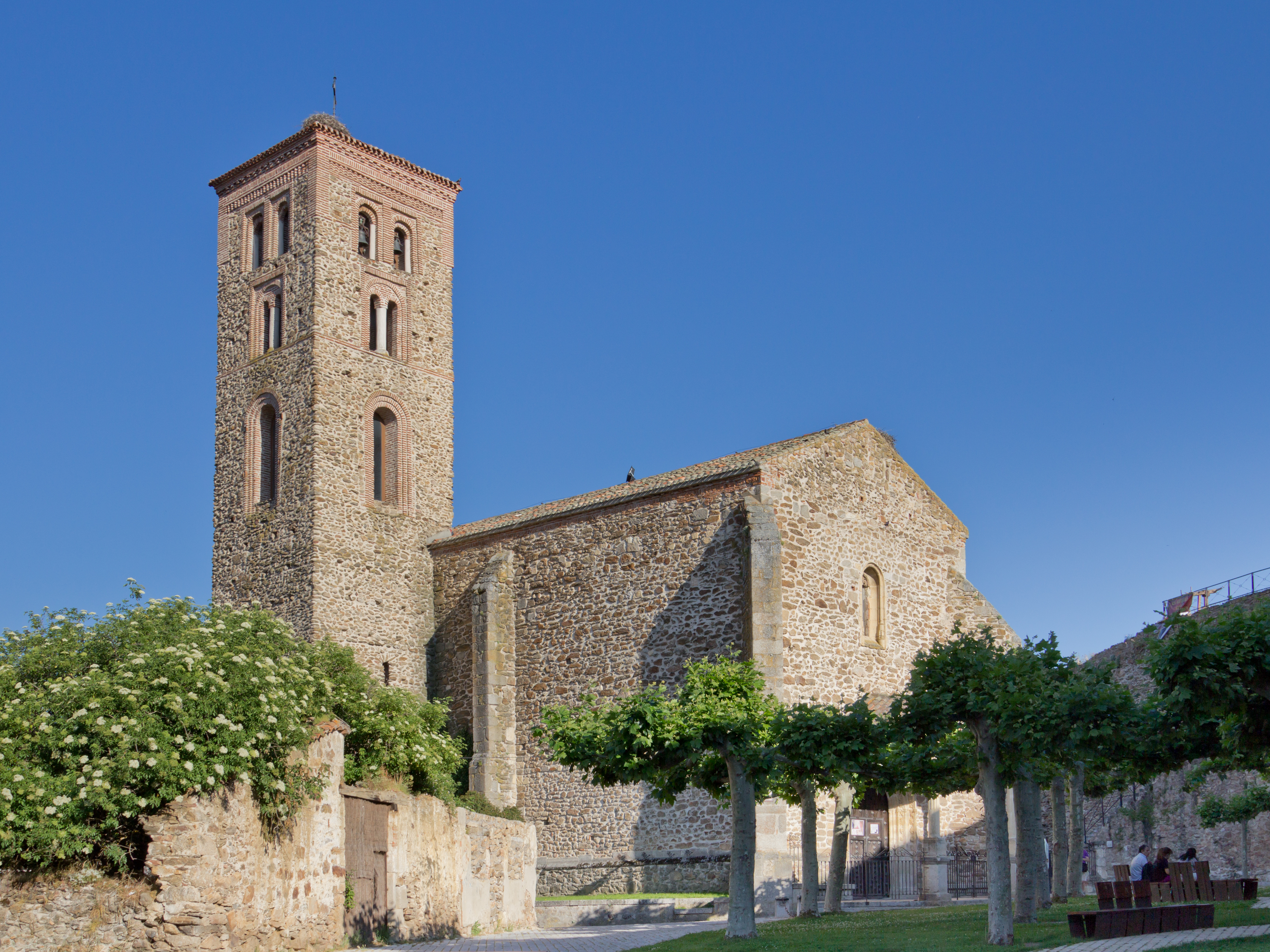
Church of Santa María del Castillo.

There was a significant Jewish quarter at the time of the expulsion of the Jews from Spain in 1492. The first documented reference to the Jewish quarter is in a census of 1290. The town census records two synagogues, one of which was in La Villa. Also recorded were a hospital, a cemetery, 86 houses (55 of which were in La Villa), a furnace and a tannery.

After the expulsion of the Jews, some converted to Christianity, whilst others left for Portugal. Many of those who converted were then subjected to the Spanish Inquisition, particularly in the decade beginning 1510.

The strategic importance of Buitrago again became significant at the start of the 19th century following the invasion of Spain by Napoleon's forces. The French forces broke through the defensive line at the Somosierra mountain pass on the 30th of November 1808 and then occupied villages and towns in the area, including Buitrago. The whole of the walled part of the town was set alight, resulting in the displacement of people to the neighbourhood of San Juan.

After the 1916 royal decree to rename municipalities in Spain, done to address the multiple occurrences of identical names, Buitrago was renamed to Buitrago del Lozoya.

The first half of the 20th century was characterised by the progressive deterioration of its notable buildings, leading to the destruction of the San Salvador hospital during the Spanish civil war. The church of Santa María del Castillo was also severely damaged. Despite this, the town wasn’t included in the reconstruction scheme of the Francoist government.

The second half of the 20th century saw significant works take place in the town and nearby, notably the creation of the Riosequillo and the Puentes Viejas reservoirs, the construction of the Telefónica satellite tracking station, and the expansion of the old N-1 road to become the A-1 autovía.

The walled area of the town was declared a national monument in 1931 and the historic quarter was declared a Bien de Interés Cultural in 1993.

== Weather ==
According to the Köppen climate classification, Buitrago del Lozoya has a Csb-type climate (temperate with dry and temperate summer).

Climate data for Buitrago del Lozoya (Riosequillo reservoir) in the period 1961-2003
Month	Jan	Feb	Mar	Apr	May	Jun	Jul	Aug	Sep	Oct	Nov	Dec	Year
Daily mean °C (°F)	4.0 (39.2)	4.9 (40.8)	7.0 (44.6)	8.8 (47.8)	12.8 (55.0)	17.1 (62.8)	20.7 (69.3)	20.4 (68.7)	16.9 (62.4)	11.8 (53.2)	7.1 (44.8)	4.6 (40.3)	11.3 (52.3)
Average precipitation mm (inches)	67.8 (2.67)	59.4 (2.34)	43.7 (1.72)	56.9 (2.24)	65.1 (2.56)	41.5 (1.63)	19.2 (0.76)	18.1 (0.71)	40.1 (1.58)	58.2 (2.29)	90.7 (3.57)	76.1 (3.00)	636.8 (25.07)
Source: Ministerio de Agricultura, Alimentación y Medio Ambiente. Datos de precipitación para el periodo 1961-2003 y de temperatura para el periodo 1961-2003 en Buitrago del Lozoya (embalse de Riosequillo)

== Tourism ==
Buitrago has numerous festive, artistic and cultural events, including Belén Viviente and Medieval Fair (Feria Medieval), which are held once every year.

=== Belén Viviente ===
In 1988, a group of residents decided to host the Belén Viviente (a live nativity scene) following an idea that had already been carried out in the small town of Báscara (in the province of Gerona), and taking as a model the shepherds that are represented in nearby towns such as Braojos de la Sierra. The first edition of the Belén Viviente involved eighty actors, with 4,000 people watching the scenes.

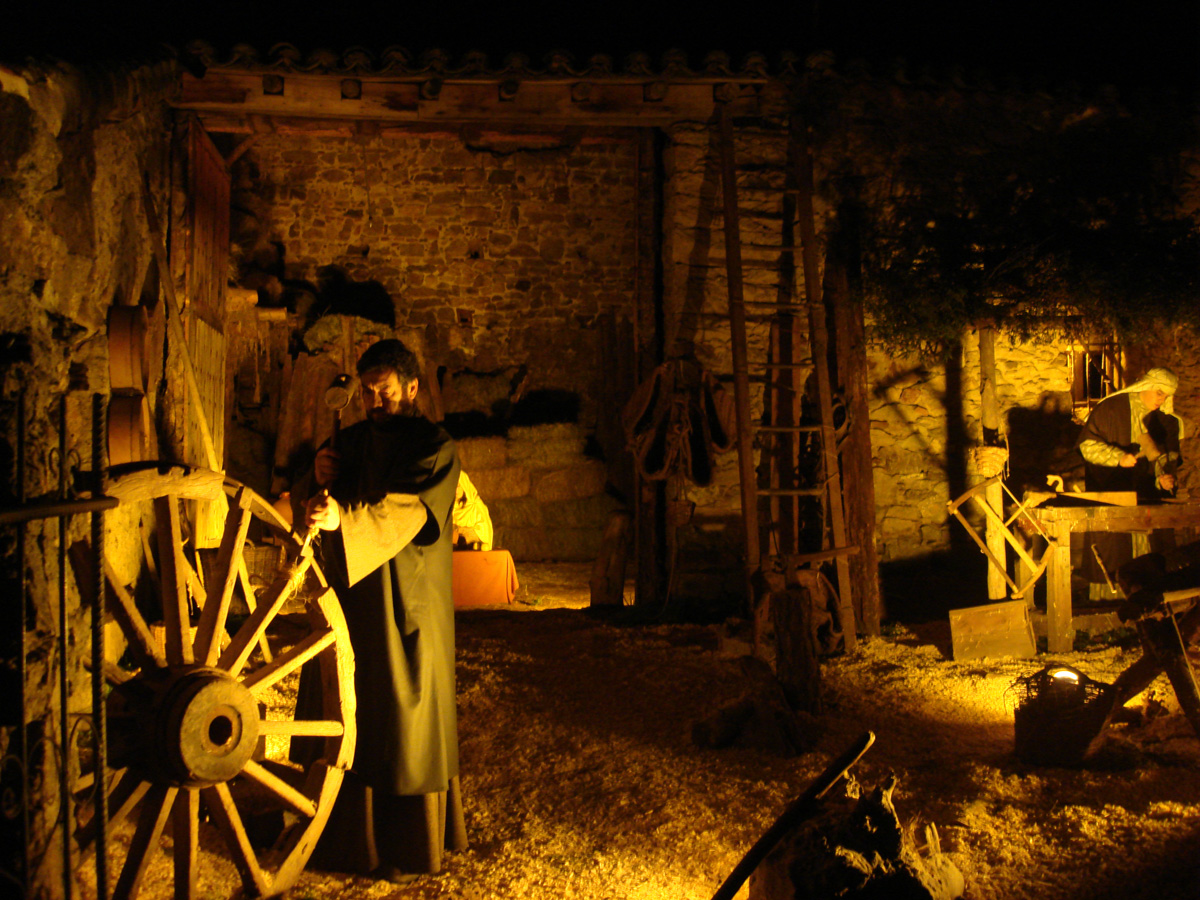
The carpenter in the Belen Viviente

Given the success of the initiative, in 1991, the Buitrago del Lozoya Living Belén Cultural Association (la Asociación Cultural Belén viviente de Buitrago del Lozoya) was founded. The number of actors joining the Belén Viviente increased to over 100 and over 10,000 visitors attended.

The Belén Viviente in Buitrago del Lozoya is now one of the most important event in Spain, with 41 scenes spread across a 1,300-meter route with over 200 actors joining the event. Around 20,000 visitors come to Buitrago del Lozoya every year to see the event.

=== Medieval Fair (Feria Medieval) ===
The Medieval Fair has been held every year since 2001 on the first weekend of September. Given the great feedback received since its first edition (attracting over 30,000 visitors every year), it has become one of the most important event in the Community of Madrid.

During the three-day period, Buitrago travels back to the Middle Ages. The fair includes a large market with over 100 stalls in addition to numerous activities like theater, music, dance and parade.

=== Corpus Christi ===
One of the oldest and most visually striking traditions of Buitrago is the celebration of Corpus Christi. One of the most important masses of the liturgical calendar is celebrated that day, with scenes relating to the Last Supper, as presented by the Asociación Cultural Belén Viviente. It’s the day when children from the town have their first communion which is followed by the parade of the processional cross that is believed to have belonged to the Vera Cruz confraternity. The residents of Buitrago also carry a number of pasos or decorative altars during the procession.

=== Festivals ===
The following festivals are celebrated by the town:

- To honour Nuestra Señora de la Asunción y a San Roque in August.
- To honour Santísimo Cristo de los Esclavos y a la Virgen de la Soledad in September.

== Public Transportation ==
Buitrago has 12 bus lines, two of them heading to the Plaza de Castilla. All lines are operated by ALSA.

Line 191: Madrid (Plaza de Castilla)-Buitrago

Line 191A: Buitrago-Braojos

Line 191B: Buitrago-Somosierra

Line 191C: Buitrago-Montejo de la Sierra

Line 191D: Buitrago-Robledillo de la Jara

Line 191E: Buitrago-Cervera de Buitrago

Line 194A: Buitrago-Lozoyuela-Rascafría

Line 195A: Buitrago-Lozoyuela (by Gargantilla)

Line 195B: Buitrago-Gargantilla

Line 196: Madrid (Plaza de Castilla)-La Acebeda

Line 911: Buitrago-Montejo-La Hiruela

Line 912: Buitrago-Montejo-Puebla de la Sierra
