= Capitulation of Madrid (1808) =

1808 capitulation during the Peninsular War

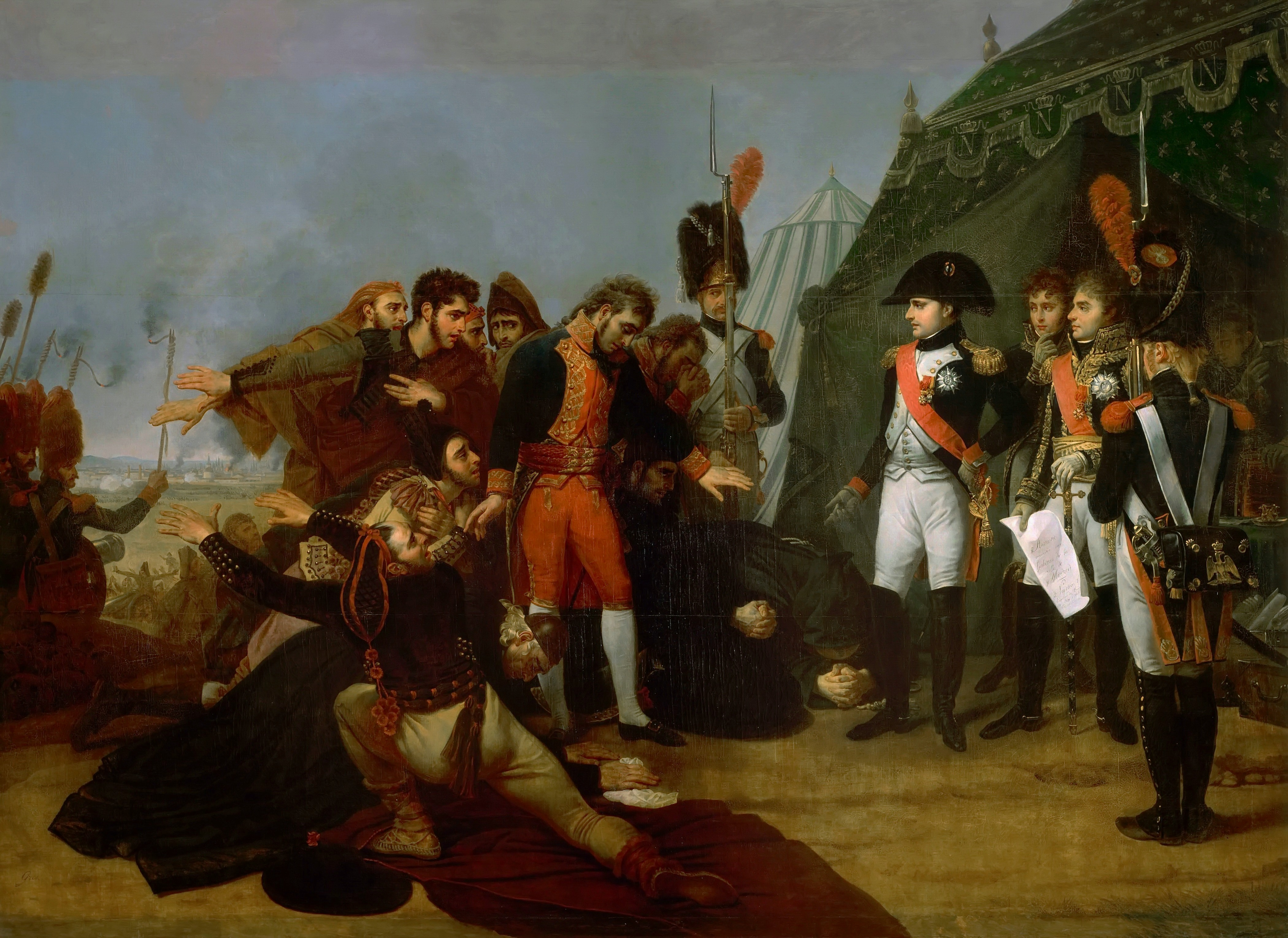
- Napoleon Accepting the Surrender of Madrid (French: Capitulation de Madrid, le 4 décembre 1808), by Antoine-Jean Gros (1810), Palace of Versailles.
- Context: Peninsular War
- Signed: 1808
- Location: Madrid, Spain
- Signatories: Tomás de Morla, Fernando de la Vera and Louis-Alexandre Berthier

At the Capitulation of Madrid, on 4 December 1808, that city's military commander Tomás de Morla and the civil governor Fernando de la Vera, in representation of the Junta of Defence (Junta Militar y Política de Madrid), capitulated to the Prince de Neuchâtel, Marshal Louis-Alexandre Berthier, in representation of Napoleon, who had himself arrived two days previously at the head of over 40,000 troops, at Chamartin, then a small village just outside the city, to the north, on 2 December, the anniversary of his important victory at Austerlitz.

It was the second time that year that a large force of French troops had entered the capital of Spain. The previous March, Marshal Murat, the newly named Grand-Duke of Berg and the 'Lieutenant of the Emperor', had also done so at Chamartín at the head of a large body of cavalry, under Grouchy, who would be appointed the military governor of Madrid during this first period, and 20,000 infantry. Murat had entered Madrid precisely the day before the arrival of the new king, Ferdinand VII. That first period of "occupation" under Murat would lead to the violent reaction of the Second of May Uprising and, ultimately to King Joseph, proclaimed monarch the following month, almost immediately ordering the evacuation of the French garrison and civil administration, which was completed by 1 August.

== Terms ==
- Article 1 stated that no religion save the Catholic Apostolic Roman faith should be tolerated
- Article 2 referred to maintaining all existing officials in their places
- Article 7 stated that French troops would not be quartered in the monasteries
- Article 11 (not included in the original terms of capitulation submitted by the city's Junta) referred to policing, stating that this would be carried out by French soldiers.

== Background ==
Just days before the Spanish army's victory at the Battle of Bailén (July 1808), which resulted in the first open-field defeat of a Napoleonic army, and with the Imperial French Army's II corps d'observation de la Gironde, under General Dupont, capitulating to General Castaños, (Note: Dupont capitulated on 22 July 1808. Díaz Torrejón 2004, p. 299.) King Joseph had made his entrance to Madrid through the Puerta de Alcalá on 20 July 1808. However, when news of Dupont's defeat reached the capital, the King was forced to order the evacuation of the French garrison and administration, which was completed by 1 August, and retreat to Aranda de Duero.

Despite that major setback, following the rout of General Belvedere's division at Gamonal (10 November), it was clear that Napoleon would head for Madrid, and on 25 November, the Marquis of Castelar, Captain-General of New Castile, and General Tomás de Morla were tasked with defending Madrid, well aware that, as a city, it was indefensible.

=== 30 November ===
General Ruffin, whose division was but the "skirmishing line" of a huge army approaching the city, had pushed through the mountain pass at Somosierra, defeating General San Juan's army at the battle there on 30 November. That same evening, Napoleon set up his headquarters at Buitrago.

=== 1 December ===
Latour-Maubourg's and Lasalle's cavalry reached the northern suburbs of Madrid. That same day, the Junta of Defence was set up, presided over by the Duke of the Infantado, which included Morla and Castelar, and "a large and heterogeneous mass of colleagues... and prominent citizens forming an unwieldy body very unfit to act as an executive council of war".

=== 2 December ===
Lahoussaye's and Latour-Maubourg's dragoons invested the northern and eastern fronts of the city in the morning. Napoleon arrived at noon, followed later that afternoon by the infantry columns of Marshal Victor's corps. That afternoon, General Montbrun handed over a summons to the Junta, which replied that "the people of Madrid were resolved to bury themselves under the ruins of their houses rather than to permit the French troops to enter their city".

Napoleon therefore commenced the preparations for an attack to be made the following morning and sent Lapisse's division of Victor's corps to clear the ground. Under cover of night, thirty guns were located opposite the weak earthworks defending Madrid's Retiro Heights, with smaller artillery in front of several of the northern and eastern gates of the city.

=== 3 December ===
Before dawn, Napoleon sent another summons to surrender, to which Castelar replied that there should be a suspension of arms for twelve hours, a delay clearly aimed at allowing the Spanish field-armies time to reach Madrid.

Napoleon's response was to order an immediate assault and the ensuing cannonade opened against several of the gates on the northern and eastern sides of the city, with the heaviest bombardment being delivered against the Retiro Heights, where several breaches were opened. General Villatte's division of Victor's corps stormed the position, garrisoned by the new levies of a single battalion of the Regiment of Mazzaredo, supported by a mass of armed citizens.

=== 4 December ===
Following the capitulation, Napoleon signed the decree abolishing the Council of Castile.

=== 5 December ===
On 5 December, Napoleon wrote to the French governor of the city, General Belliard, regarding the capitulation; "The Spaniards have failed to carry it out, and I consider the whole thing void". (Note: "La capitulation, n'ayant pas été tenue par les habitants de Madrid, est nulle". Oman 1902, footnote 528.)

As well as declaring prisoners of war all those superior officers of the army that were still resident in Madrid, including retired veterans, Napoleon declared ten leading figures traitors to both France and Spain, condemning them to death; the dukes of the Infantado, Híjar, Medinaceli, and Osuna, Pedro Cevallos and the Bishop of Santander, none of whom were in Madrid at the time, and the Prince of Castelfranco, the Marquis of Santa Cruz, and the Count of Altamira, who were arrested and sentenced to imprisonment for life in France. Although the Marquis de Saint-Simon, a French émigré, was court-martialled and condemned to death, Napoleon commuted the sentence to imprisonment for life in the mountain-fortress of Joux after Saint-Simon's daughter had begged for her father's life. Other people arrested included Arias Mon who, since May had been interim president of the Council of Castile, the Duke of Sotomayor, (Note: Oman (1902) mistakenly refers to the "Duke of Sotomayor", Sotomayor being the last surname of the then-Count Fernán Núñez, who would later become the 1st Duke of Fernán Núñez.) and some thirty other leading citizens: some of whom were sent to France, while others were allowed to go free after swearing allegiance to King Joseph.

A curfew entered into force that evening, prohibiting people from leaving their houses after 10 pm.

== Aftermath ==
Meanwhile, on 11 December, and still unaware that Madrid had capitulated, Sir John Moore, with 22,500 British infantry, 2,500 cavalry and 66 guns headed northeast from Salamanca to carry out his plan of creating a "red herring" to draw Napoleon away from besieging the capital to deal with the threat to Valladolid, a city critical to the French communications. Although Moore knew that he would sooner or later have to retreat, it was a risk he was willing to take. But it was based on two erroneous beliefs: that Madrid was still holding out and that Napoleon had only 80,000 troops available. Fortunately for Moore, Napoleon believed that Moore was headed for Lisbon.

When Napoleon left Madrid on 21 December, he left King Joseph with 36,000 men to garrison the capital and its suburbs: Marshal Lefebvre's corps, two thirds of Victor's corps and three cavalry divisions, plus 90 guns.

== Opinion of Charles Oman (1902) ==
In volume 1 of his A History of the Peninsular War, 1807-1809 (1902), British military historian Charles Oman refers to the capitulation and Napoleon's motives as follows:

Looking at the preposterous clauses which he had allowed to be inserted in the document, there can be no doubt that this was his intention at the very moment when he ratified it. It was a small thing that he should break engagements,... But having guaranteed security for their life and property, freedom from arrest, and free exit at their pleasure, to such persons as chose to remain behind in the city, it was shameless to commence his proceedings with a proscription and a long series of arrests. The list of persons declared traitors and condemned to loss of life and goods was not very long: only ten persons were named, and seven of these were absent from Madrid. But the three others, the Prince of Castelfranco, the Marquis of Santa Cruz, and the Count of Altamira, were seized and dispatched into France, sentenced to imprisonment for life.

== See also ==
- Spain under Joseph Bonaparte
- Timeline of the Peninsular War

== Sources ==
- Oman, Charles (1902). "A History of the Peninsula War, Vol. I." Project Gutenberg.
- Chandler, David G. (1966). "The Campaigns of Napoleon". Internet Archive.
