= Citadel of Madrid =

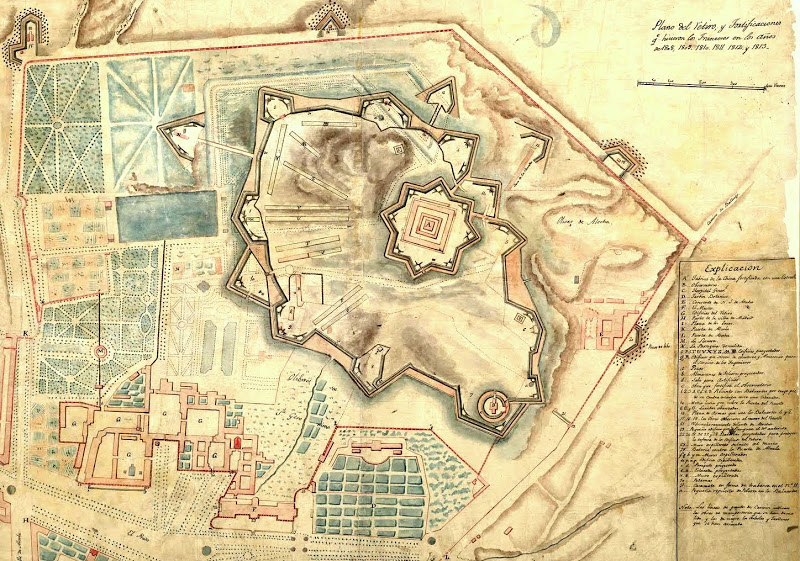
Plan of the Retiro and Fortifications made by the French in 1808, 1809, 1810, 1811, 1812 y 1813 (c. 1813)

The citadel of Madrid was a star fort with three fortified enceintes constructed by the French Army during the Peninsular War, in the grounds of the Palacio del Buen Retiro, on the Retiro heights, (Note: In 1808, Madrid's wall was made of brick and adobe and, as such, unable to withstand any serious attack. The heights of the Retiro, at 27 pies (7.5m) above the Puerta del Sol, were one of the two most elevated areas outside the city at that time, the other elevated area being the Puerta de Santa Barbara, to the north, at 62 pies (approx. 17m) (Pérez, 1908: p. 362).) outside the eastern gate of the city of Madrid.

== Origins ==
Napoleon, on approaching Madrid, considered the vantage-ground of the heights of the Retiro key to taking the capital of Spain. He therefore set up, under cover of darkness, thirty guns opposite the earthworks which the Spanish troops had built there and other, smaller artillery in front of the other gates of the city, to distract the attention of the garrison. Before dawn, the Emperor sent another summons to surrender. The Captain-General of New Castile, the Marquis of Castelar, however, used the time to abandon the city, taking some five thousand troops and sixteen cannon with him to Talavera de la Reina. Considerable damage was done to Madrid's other defences, but the real assault was delivered against the Retiro heights and, once breaches had been made, Villatte's division of Victor's corps stormed the position with ease. The Spanish garrison of this section of Madrid's defences consisted of a single battalion of new levies—the Regiment of Mazzaredo—and a mass of armed citizens.

Joaquín Murat, the commander of the French Army in Spain, occupied Madrid in March 1808 with more than 40,000 veteran troops. While he was lodged at Chamartín, his chief of staff, Augustin Daniel Belliard, was commissioned to prepare Madrid's headquarters for 25,000 men by "taking charge of the Retiro and considering it a citadel of Madrid, under the orders of Grouchy".

The palace at the Retiro was converted into the French Army's headquarters. The gardens and trees were removed to build the enceintes and several buildings were demolished or converted into arsenals.

Apart from the artillery and Moncey's brigade of dragoons stationed at the Retiro, the rest of the French troops based in and around Madrid were stationed at the convent of San Bernardino, located where the current Ciudad Universitaria was built, in the streets of Leganitos and Fuencarral, and the districts of El Pardo and Carabanchel.

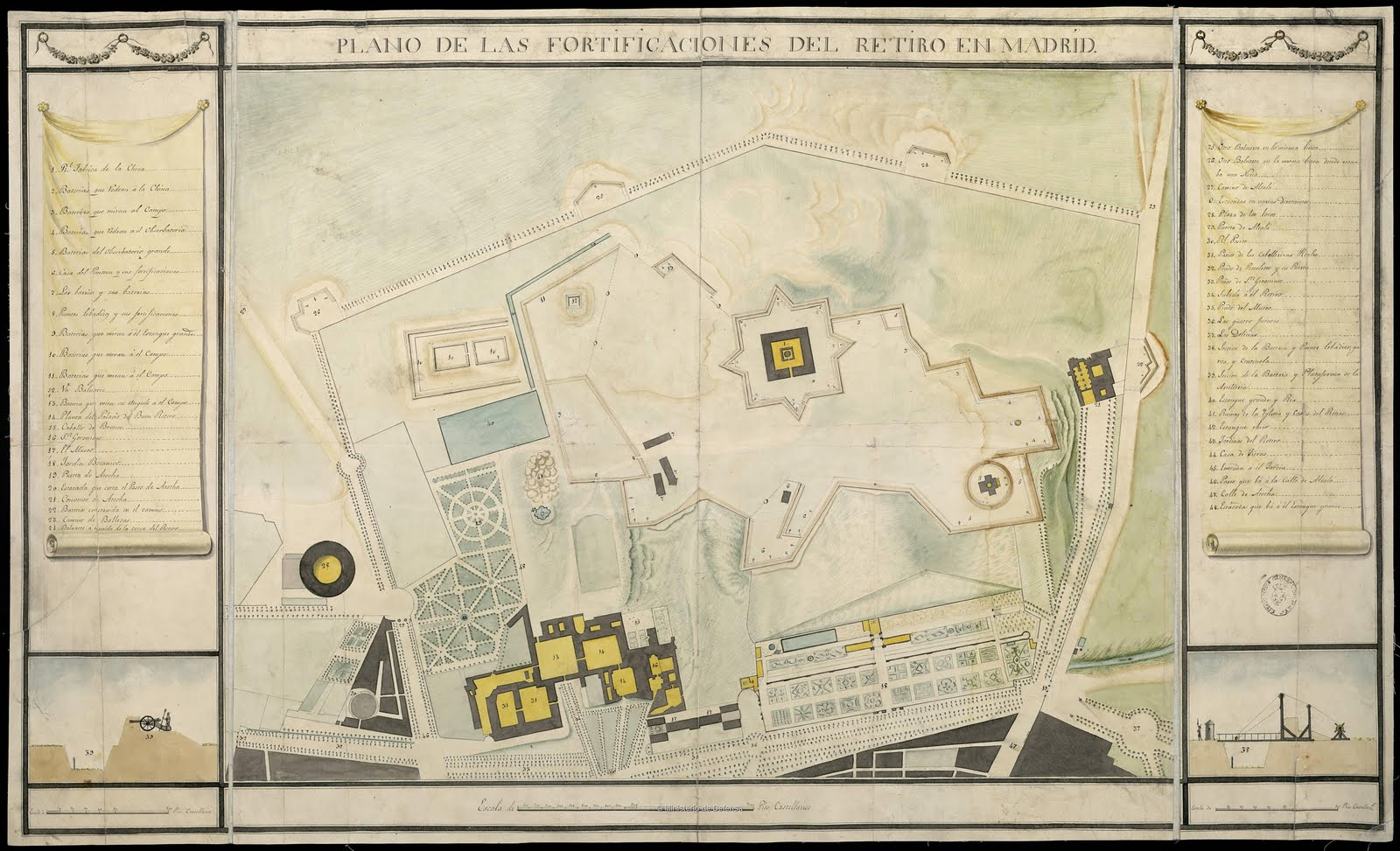
Plan of the French fortifications in the Retiro (c. 1813)

Prior to the Battle of Talavera (27–28 July 1809), King Joseph left Madrid 23 July, at the head of some 5,800 troops, to meet up with Victor's 23,000 troops, and Sebastiani's 17,500, to take the offensive against Cuesta at Torrijos, rather than letting him advance on Madrid.

Left behind was only one brigade of Dessolles's division, with a few Spanish levies, with which Belliard, the governor of the city, was expected to hold the capital; some 4,000 men, in all. Belliard had to be prepared to retreat into the Retiro fort, with his troops and the whole body of the Afrancesados and their families, if there was an insurrection, or if Venegas managed to reach the city from the east, or possibly Wilson, whose column was at Escalona (Toledo), just thirty-eight miles from Madrid, with a force that was believed to be much larger than it actually was. (Note: Wilson's force actually numbered some four thousand troops while the intelligence Victor gave King Joseph referred to between eight and ten thousand troops. (Oman, 1903: 507.))

== Capitulation ==
Following the Battle of Majadahonda (11 August 1812), fought on the outskirts of the city, Wellington was able to liberate Madrid when, on 14 August 1812, the French garrison at the citadel, under Lafon Blaniac, the governor of the province of La Mancha, with some 2,000 men, mainly of the Army of Andalusia, and mostly conscripts, surrendered. Although the double enceinte and the star fort in the interior would have been effective against guerrilleros or insurgents, the place could not hold out for long against siege-guns.

== Post-war transformation and use ==
The French fortifications and most of the remains of the palace were demolished during the reign of Fernando. The only buildings left standing of the original palace. were the Casón (Note: After being restored in 1881, it opened as the Museum of Artistic Reproductions and, in 1974, it housed the Prado Museum's 19th century works. From 1981 to 1992, it housed Picasso's Guernica on its return to Spain until the work was moved to its permanent location at the Reina Sofia Museum) and the Salón de Reinos (Note: The Salón de Reinos would house the Museo del Ejército until 2010, when it was moved to Toledo.) and the land was converted into gardens, until 1868–1869, when it was handed over to the Council of Madrid, as the public park of El Retiro.

== Bibliography ==
- Pérez de Guzmán y Gallo Juan (1908) [2008]. El Dos de Mayo de 1808 en Madrid. (Editorial MAXTOR, ISBN 8497614194, 9788497614191.) Google Books
