= Battle of Majadahonda =

1812 battle during the Peninsular War

- Part of the Peninsular War
- Map of the Battle of Majadahonda (second phase)
Date	11 August 1812
Location	Majadahonda, Spain 40.4667°N 3.8667°W
Result	Inconclusive (see Outcome section)

Belligerents
(First French Empire) French Empire; (Kingdom of Italy (Napoleonic)) Italy; (Kingdom of Westphalia) Westphalia	(United Kingdom of Great Britain and Ireland) United Kingdom; Portugal

Commanders and leaders
(First French Empire) Anne-François-Charles Trelliard	(United Kingdom of Great Britain and Ireland) Benjamin D'Urban (Note: Bock's units were under his command. Wellington's and Joseph's involvement in battle is not described, but Fortescue's text says that the battle "nearly undermined Wellington's reputation for never losing a cannon.")

Strength
2,000 men (Note: Engaged only.); 4 cannon	2,300 men (Note: Engaged only.); 6 cannon (Note: The data excludes at least Franco-allied support troops.)

Casualties and losses
100–200 men killed, wounded or missing (Note: Estimates: • 100–120 • 166, including 16 officers. Fortescue estimates at least 150 lower ranks, only on the basis that the Allies lost as many officers as the Franco-allies. • 200)	176–200 men killed, wounded or captured (Note: Estimates: • 176 • 196 • 200); 3 cannon captured (Note: The battle was between Trelliard and D'Urban. D'Urban lost 3 cannons and only got them back with the help of reinforcements from the army. The Allies were unable to prevent the French from burning the gun carriages.); 81–121 horses (Note: Fortescue estimates 196 men and 81 horses. More modern figures give 121 horses.)

Peninsular War
Castile 1811–13
current battle

The Battle of Majadahonda (11 August 1812) saw an Imperial French cavalry division led by Anne-François-Charles Trelliard attack two brigades of cavalry under Benjamin D'Urban and forming the advance guard of Arthur Wellesley, Earl of Wellington's army. Trelliard's leading brigade routed D'Urban's Portuguese horsemen and overran three British cannons. King's German Legion (KGL) cavalry led by Eberhardt Otto George von Bock intervened to halt the Imperial French horsemen, but were finally compelled to withdraw when Trelliard committed his second and third brigades to the contest. The Imperial French cavalry was unable to cope with a KGL infantry battalion defending a village and they withdrew at the approach of additional British cavalry and infantry. This Peninsular War action was fought near Majadahonda, which is located 16 kilometres (9.9 mi) northwest of Madrid.

== Background ==
After General Arthur Wellesley, 1st Duke of Wellington's great victory at the Battle of Salamanca, the Anglo-Portuguese Army moved on Madrid from the northwest. On 11 August, the 1st, 11th and 12th Dragoons of D'Urban's Portuguese brigade formed Wellington's advanced guard. Behind them was Bock's brigade under Colonel de Jonquières, consisting of the 1st and 2nd King's German Legion (KGL) Dragoons. Farther back in the column, Colonel Colin Halkett led the 1st and 2nd KGL Light Infantry battalions, plus 7 companies of the Brunswick Oels battalion.

== Battle ==
=== First phase ===
D'Urban's troopers were surprised by Trelliard's division, which included the 13th, 18th, 19th and 22nd Dragoons, plus the Westphalian Chevau-légers and the Italian Napoleone Dragoons. The Portuguese horsemen were routed and three cannons were lost. A frustrated D'Urban wrote of his troopers,

"At Salamanca they followed me into the enemy's ranks like British dragoons; yesterday they were so far from doing their duty that in the first charge they just went far enough to land me in the enemy's ranks. In the second, which (having got them rallied) I rashly attempted, I could not get them within 20 yards of the enemy – they left me alone, and vanished before the French helmets like leaves before the autumn wind."

=== Second phase ===
Bock's heavy dragoons soon arrived and the Portuguese horsemen rallied behind them. With the help of the 1st KGL Light Infantry battalion, the combined British-Portuguese force managed to halt the French advance. However, the French managed to repel a counteroffensive by both the Germans and the Portuguese, pushing them back. The Light Battalion then assisted by taking up positions in a house and opening fire on the French. This gave the Germans time to regroup and attack again. Historian Fortescue does not say whether this attack was successful, only that it created a "considerable effect". Trelliard withdrew after hearing of additional allied reinforcements. The next morning the allies entered Majadahonda and discovered the lost cannons captured by the French in the first phase.

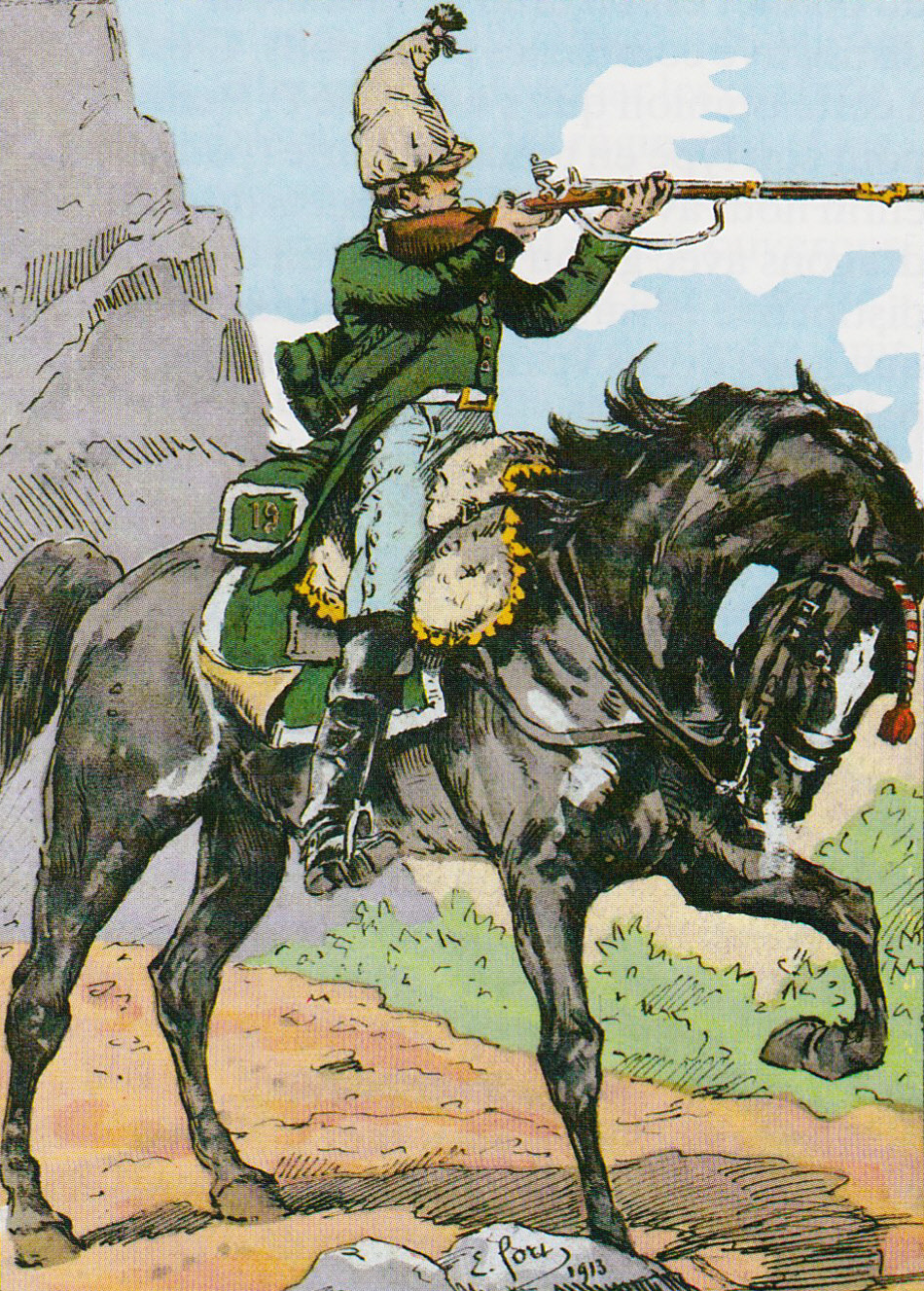
French dragoon of the 19th Regiment in Spain, 1811

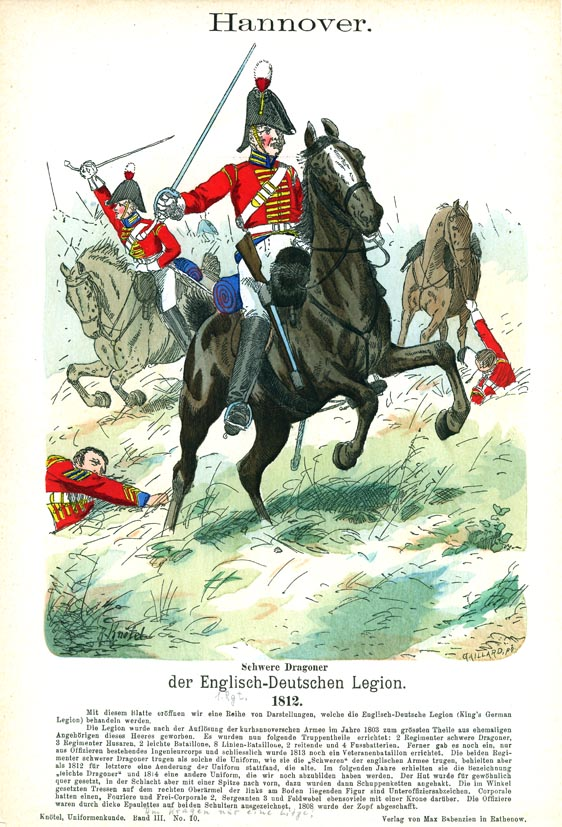
Hanover: King's German Legion. Heavy dragoon. 1812

=== Outcome ===
The French managed to push back the Anglo-Portuguese twice, but ultimately failed to break through their defence, since the cavalry was unable to cope with the enemy infantry occupying a house; this infantry was protecting its shaken cavalrymen, who managed to regroup and strike. Upon the arrival of numerous Coalition reinforcements under other British commanders, namely Ponsonby and Halkett (Trelliard was numerically inferior even before these reinforcements), the French decided to withdraw without engaging them in combat. Thus, the encounter between Trelliard and D'Urban was never brought to a victory, despite the fact that the last cavalry attack had certain effect on the French.

Fortescue puts the outcome this way:

"[...] it must be regretfully confessed that the mishap, which Wellington described as "a devil of an affair", was entirely due to the misconduct of the Portuguese."

== Aftermath ==
All told, 2,300 British-Portuguese troops were engaged against about 2,000 Frenchmen. Trelliard lost between 100 and 200 men, compared to 176–200 British-Portuguese losses. Bock lost 14 killed, 40 wounded and 7 captured. D'Urban reported 33 killed, 52 wounded and 23 captured. The KGL infantry had 7 men wounded.

The British-Portuguese advance guard was severely mauled at Majalahonda. In less than an hour, they lost up to 200 men, 3 guns captured, while one of their two brigade commanders (Colonel de Jonquiéres), and two of their five regimental commanders (Visconde de Barbaçena and Colonel Lobo) were made prisoners. The French abandoned the 3 guns after burning the carriages. French casualties were probably half that, with one officer killed and 15 wounded, including Colonel Reiset.

The KGL Dragoons covered themselves with glory, while the Portuguese dishonored themselves in the eyes of the army. Their performance at Majadahonda erased the laurels they had won at Salamanca. Marshal Beresford, the commander of the Portuguese Army, thought the Portuguese dragoons should be punished and proposed the following to Wellington: "I have ordered that they should not again mount a horse or wear a sword till they may, by coming near the enemy, have an opportunity of redeeming their credit... till then, hanging their swords on their saddles, they lead their horses, marching themselves. The Portuguese have a good deal of feeling and pride, and it is the only way to work on them..."

Wellington, however, thought differently: "As for sending the cavalry to the rear that is impossible at the present. We have still a good deal upon our hands, and we are worse provided with cavalry than our neighbours; and a body commanded by such a man as D'Urban, even though they will not fight, are better than none. In fact, they behaved infamously, and they must not be employed again alone, or with our cavalry, who gallop too fast for them."

The battle had a significant outcome for the French garrison in Madrid. Treilliard's report of the battle led to King Joseph Bonaparte's sudden hasty withdrawal from city the next day. Wellington was able to liberate Madrid when, on 14 August, the French garrison at the Citadel of Madrid, under Lafon Blaniac, the governor of the province of La Mancha, with some 2,000 men surrendered.

== Notes ==
Preceded by Battle of Klyastitsy	Napoleonic Wars; Battle of Majadahonda	Succeeded by Battle of Gorodechno
