= Somosierra =

- Municipality
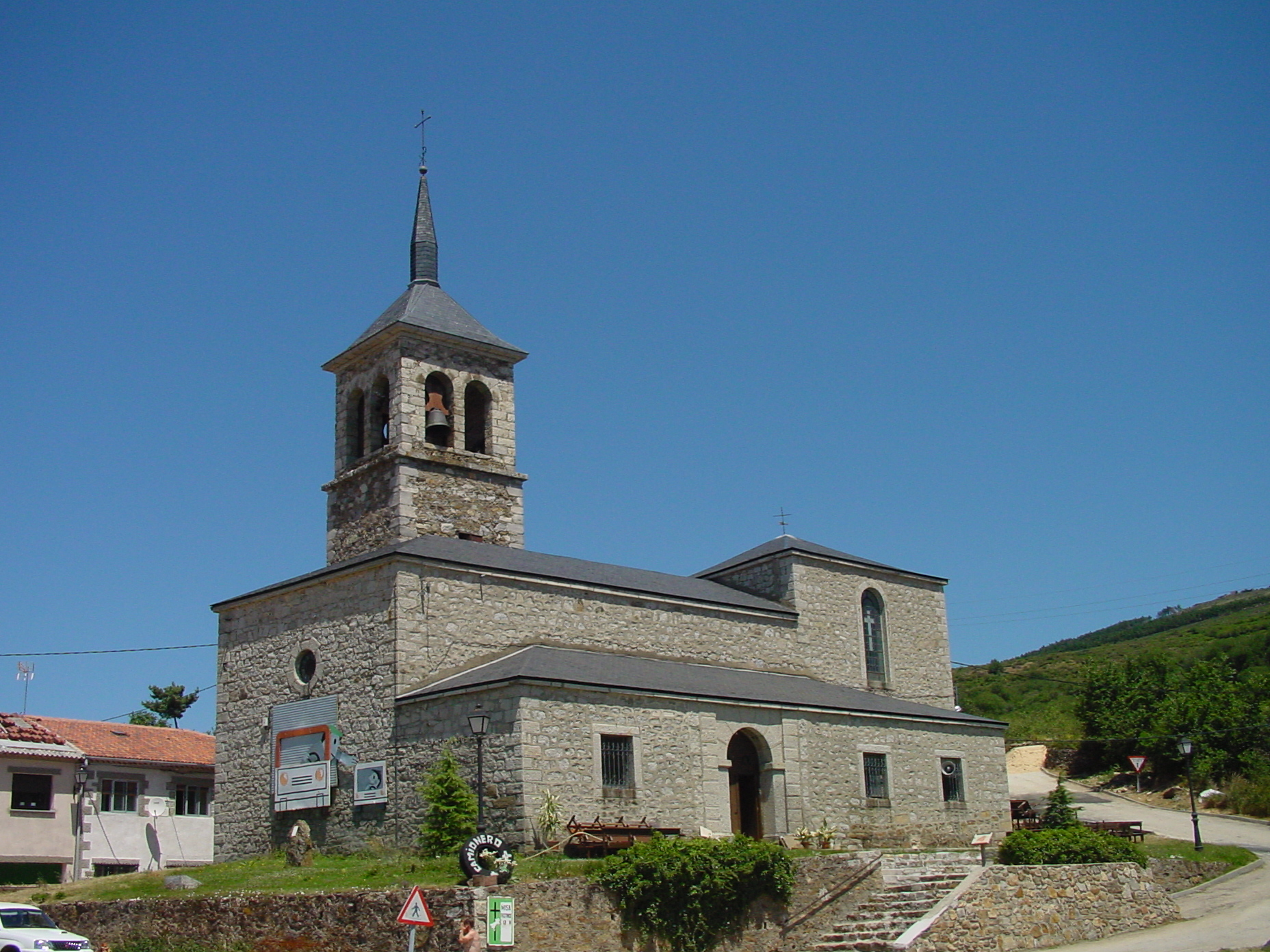

- Coat of arms

- Location of Somosierra in Spain Somosierra (Community of Madrid)
- Coordinates: 41.1325°N 3.581667°W
- Country: Spain
- Province: Community of Madrid

Government
  - Mayor: Francisco Sanz Gutierrez

Area
  - Total: 20.42 km^{2} (7.88 sq mi)
- Elevation: 1,433 m (4,701 ft)

Population (2025-01-01)
  - Total: 93
  - Density: 4.6/km^{2} (12/sq mi)
- Time zone: UTC+1 (CET)
  - Summer (DST): UTC+2 (CEST)
- Postal code: 28756

Somosierra is a municipality in the Community of Madrid, Spain, located at 83 km north of Madrid, in the mountain pass with the same name, at an elevation of 1433 metres above sea level, being the northernmost town of Community of Madrid. The Battle of Somosierra was fought here in 1808 during the Napoleonic Wars, and the Battle of Guadarrama was fought nearby in 1936 during the Spanish Civil War.

== Public transport ==
Nowadays the only way to arrive to Somosierra is with the following bus lines:

191: Madrid - Buitrago

191B: Buitrago - Somosierra

Formerly, the train line Madrid - Burgos passed through the village (it also had a train station called Robregordo-Somosierra, although it didn’t give service to Somosierra), but since 2011 the trains are no longer passing due to a landslide in the Somosierra tunnel.
