= Guillaume Joseph Nicolas de Lafon-Blaniac =

French army officer (1773–1833)

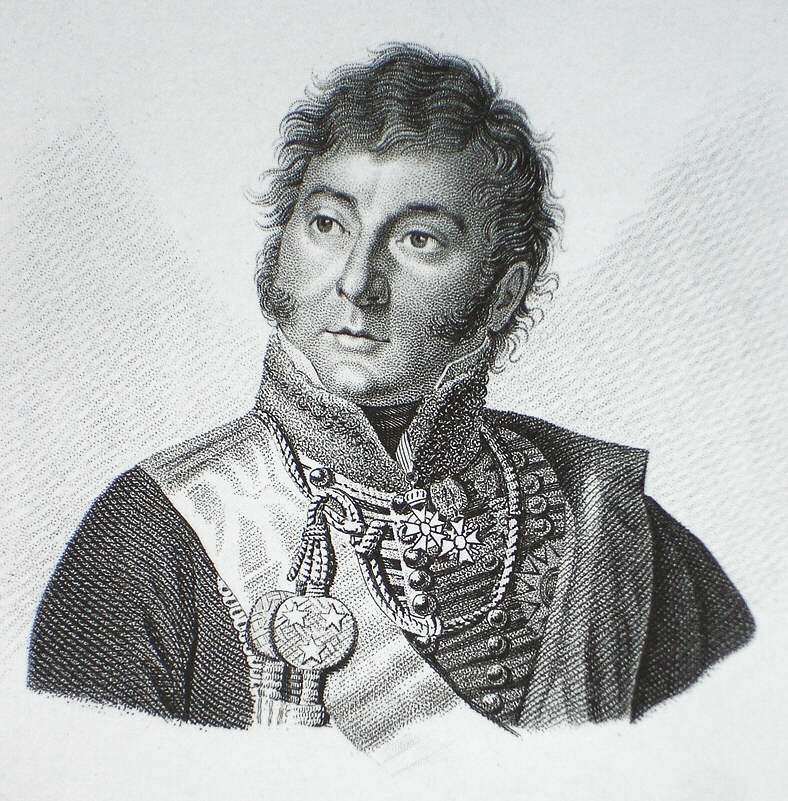
- Born: 25 July 1773; Villeneuve-sur-Lot, Lot-et-Garonne
- Died: 28 September 1833 (aged 60) Vico, Corsica
- Allegiance: First French Republic; First French Empire (Spain under Joseph Bonaparte) Kingdom of Spain; Kingdom of France
- Branch: French Army; Spanish Army
- Service years: 1792–1815, 1818-1825, 1830–1833
- Rank: General de division
- Conflicts: French Revolutionary Wars; Egyptian Campaign; Napoleonic Wars; Peninsular War; Battle of Vitoria; Hundred Days
- Awards: Legion of Honour (Grand Officier); Order of St. Louis; Inscription on the Arc de Triomphe

Guillaume Joseph Nicolas de Lafon-Blaniac (1773–1833) was a French military commander.

== Biography ==
=== Early career ===
Lafon-Blaniac enlisted as a second lieutenant in the 5th Regiment of chasseurs à cheval (French light cavalry), in 1792.

After seeing action in Italy, he saw further action in Napoleon's Egypt, and was equerry to Joseph Bonaparte in Austria, Prusia and Naples.

He was promoted to brigadier general in 1806.

=== Peninsular War ===
When Joseph Bonaparte became King of Spain in 1808 Lafon-Blaniac entered Spanish service as his aide-de-camp, with the rank of major general. In 1810 he was appointed governor of Madrid.

In March 1812, Lafon-Blaniac was named governor of La Mancha and given command of the vanguard for the Army of the Centre.

Appointed Captain-General of New Castille, he was left in command of the garrison when King Joseph marched from Madrid on 21 July, too late to help Marmont's Army of Portugal at Salamanca (22 July).

At the beginning of August, with Wellington's vanguard rapidly approaching, Lafon-Blaniac was given the order to defend the citadel —contrary to Jourdan's advice— rather than withdrawing from the capital. (Note: The garrison was also responsible for the 500 non-transportable sick of the Army of the Centre, who were not in the Retiro citadel, but at the military hospital in the Prado, outside the fortifications. (Oman, 1914: p. 508.)) His garrison at Madrid consisted of some 2,000 men, mainly drafts belonging to the Army of Andalusia. Although they belonged to several different regiments, they were all French troops of the line; there were no juramentados among them.

Although the double enceinte and the star fort in the interior would have been effective against guerrilleros or insurgents, the place could not hold out against siege-guns, and following the Battle of Majadahonda (11 August), fought on the outskirts of the city, on 14 August 1812 Lafon-Blaniac surrendered. Wellington himself had entered the city two days previously; an initial attack on the citadel had forced its defenders into the inner enceinte which, although formidably palisaded, with a ditch twelve feet deep and twenty-four wide, had only one well left. An additional danger was that the huge arsenal was vulnerable to shell-fire.

In June 1813 Lafon-Blaniac was wounded at Vitoria.

=== Later career ===
Afterwards he re-entered French service, with the rank of general de division. In January 1814 he was given command of the Cavalry of the Reserve of the Army of Italy, and fought in all the battles until Napoleon abdicated. While being retained in the army and given the Order of St. Louis, he returned to the Emperor's side during the Hundred Days.

After the Bourbons had returned to power once more, Lafon-Blaniac enlisted in the army again from 1818 until his retirement in 1825. After the July Revolution of 1830 he was reactivated, named a grand officer of the Legion of Honour and later given command of a division on Corsica. He died there in Vico. His name is inscribed on the southern pillar of the Arc de Triomphe.
