= Capture of the Rosily Squadron =

1808 battle of the Peninsular War

- Part of the Peninsular War
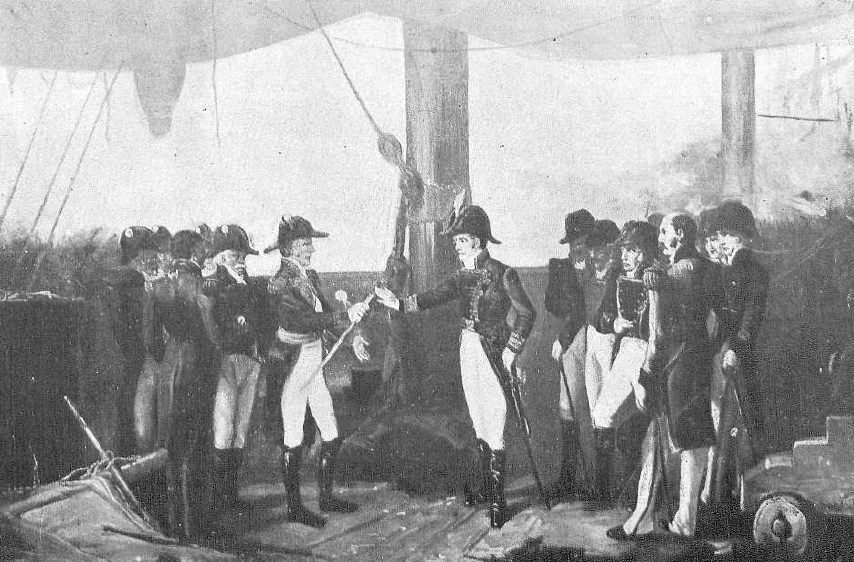
- Painting of Rosily surrendering to de Apodaca
Date	9–14 June 1808
Location	Cádiz, Spain 36°29′N 6°14′W
Result	Spanish victory

Belligerents
Spain	France

Commanders and leaders
Juan Ruiz de Apodaca; Tomás de Morla	François Rosily (POW)

Strength
5 ships of the line 1 frigate At least 2,000 sailors and militia Numerous gunboats	5 ships of the line 1 frigate 4,000 sailors

Casualties and losses
4 killed 50 wounded 15 gunboats sunk	13 killed 46 wounded 3,676 captured 5 ships of the line captured 1 frigate captured

Peninsular War: Spanish uprising 1808

The capture of the Rosily Squadron (also known as the Battle of Poza de Santa Isabel) took place on 14 June 1808 in Cádiz following the Second of May uprising against French troops in Madrid. Five ships of the line and a frigate of the French Imperial Navy were in the port, having remained there under a British blockade since the Battle of Trafalgar in 1805. After an engagement with the Spanish lasting five days, French Admiral François Étienne de Rosily-Mesros surrendered his entire squadron with the 4,000 seamen then on board.

== Background ==
The spring of 1808 saw a deterioration in relations between erstwhile allies Spain and France, culminating in rebellions against the Spanish king Charles IV, leading to a French occupation and the placing of Joseph Bonaparte on the Spanish throne. Popular uprisings across Spain against Bonapartist rule commenced with the Second of May uprising in Madrid. Conventional warfare against the Napoleonic occupation began at El Bruc, Catalonia, the 6th of June 1808.

Under difficult circumstances, Rosily endeavoured to gain enough time for the arrival at Cádiz of French troops which had been dispatched from Madrid to Andalusia. He took up defensive positions, beyond the reach of the land batteries, in the channel which leads to La Carraca. While anchored there, he first offered to quit the bay, in order to quiet the multitude; he next proposed to the British, who were blockading the port, to send his cannon ashore, to keep his crews on board and to conceal his flag. In exchange, he required hostages for the safety of his sick and for the French inhabitants of Cádiz, and a pledge that he should be safe from attack. The British would not consent to this.

The Spanish governor of Cádiz, Tomás de Morla, refused to comply with Rosily's demands, and instead demanded that he should surrender his forces. On Rosily's refusal, the Spaniards placed batteries on the Isle of Leon and near Fort Louis.

=== French ships ===
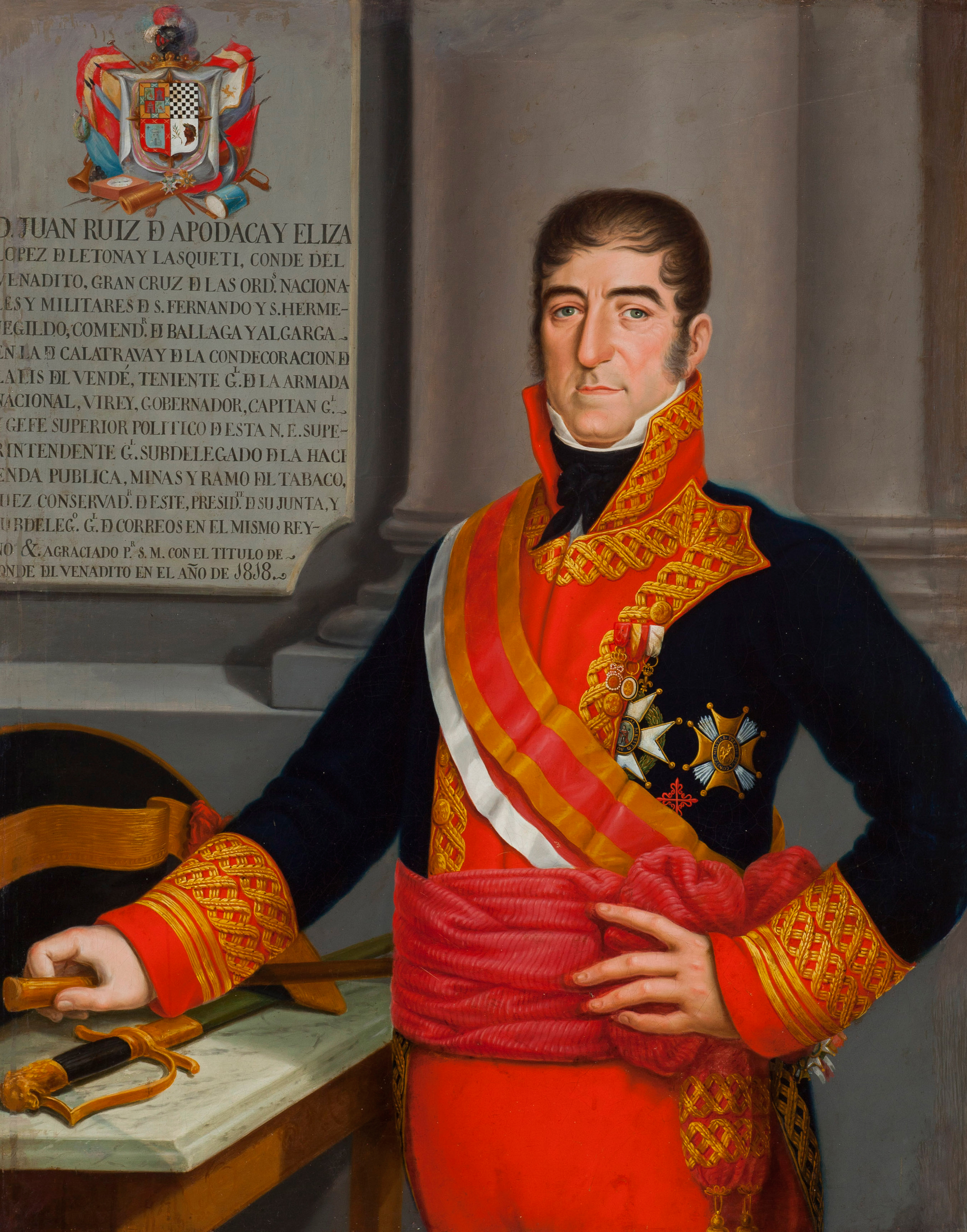
Portrait of de Apocada

The French ships and their numbers of guns were:

- Neptune: 80
- Héros: 74
- Pluton: 74
- Algesiras: 80
- Argonaute: 74
- Cornélie: 40

== Battle ==
On 9 June, at 3 PM, a division of Spanish gun and mortar boats and the batteries erected on the Isle of Leon and at Fort Louis commenced hostilities against the French ships with steady fire, which was kept up until nightfall. The Spaniards had even requested that two ships of the line, Principe de Asturias (112) and Terrible (74), help them.

On the following morning, the 10th, the cannonade recommenced and continued until 2 PM, when the French flagship, Héros, hoisted a flag of truce. Shortly afterwards Vice-Admiral Rosily addressed a letter to Morla, offering to disembark his guns and ammunition but retain his men and not hoist any colours. These terms were considered unacceptable, the Spaniards prepared to renew the attack upon the French squadron with an increase of force. On the 14th, at 7 AM, an additional battery of 30 long 24-pounders was ready to act and numerous gun and mortar vessels took up their stations. The French ships struck their colours, which in the course of the forenoon, were replaced by those of Spain.

The British were impatient spectators of this action. Admiral Collingwood, who commanded the blockade of Cádiz, made an offer of co-operation, but his offer was refused by the Spanish. It was enough for them that the British should prevent the fleet from escaping, but they were not disposed to give them any claim to a prey which could be captured without their aid.

== Aftermath ==
Immediately after the surrender of the French fleet, the Spanish Supreme Junta requested the British Admiral give passage in one of his vessels to the commissioners whom it wished to send for the purpose of negotiating with the Government of his Britannic Majesty for an alliance against Napoleon.

Mr George Canning, the British Foreign Secretary, stated:

No longer remember that war has existed between Spain and Great Britain. Every nation which resists the exorbitant power of France becomes immediately, and whatever may have been its previous relations with us, the natural ally of Great Britain.

On 4 July, the British government emitted an order declaring that all hostilities between Great Britain and Spain would cease with immediate effect.

== See also ==
- Timeline of the Peninsular War

== Notes ==
Preceded by Battles of El Bruch	Napoleonic Wars; Capture of the Rosily Squadron	Succeeded by Battle of Cabezón
