= Jean Joseph Dessolles, 1st Marquis Dessolles =

French soldier and statesman (1767–1828)

Jean Joseph Dessolles
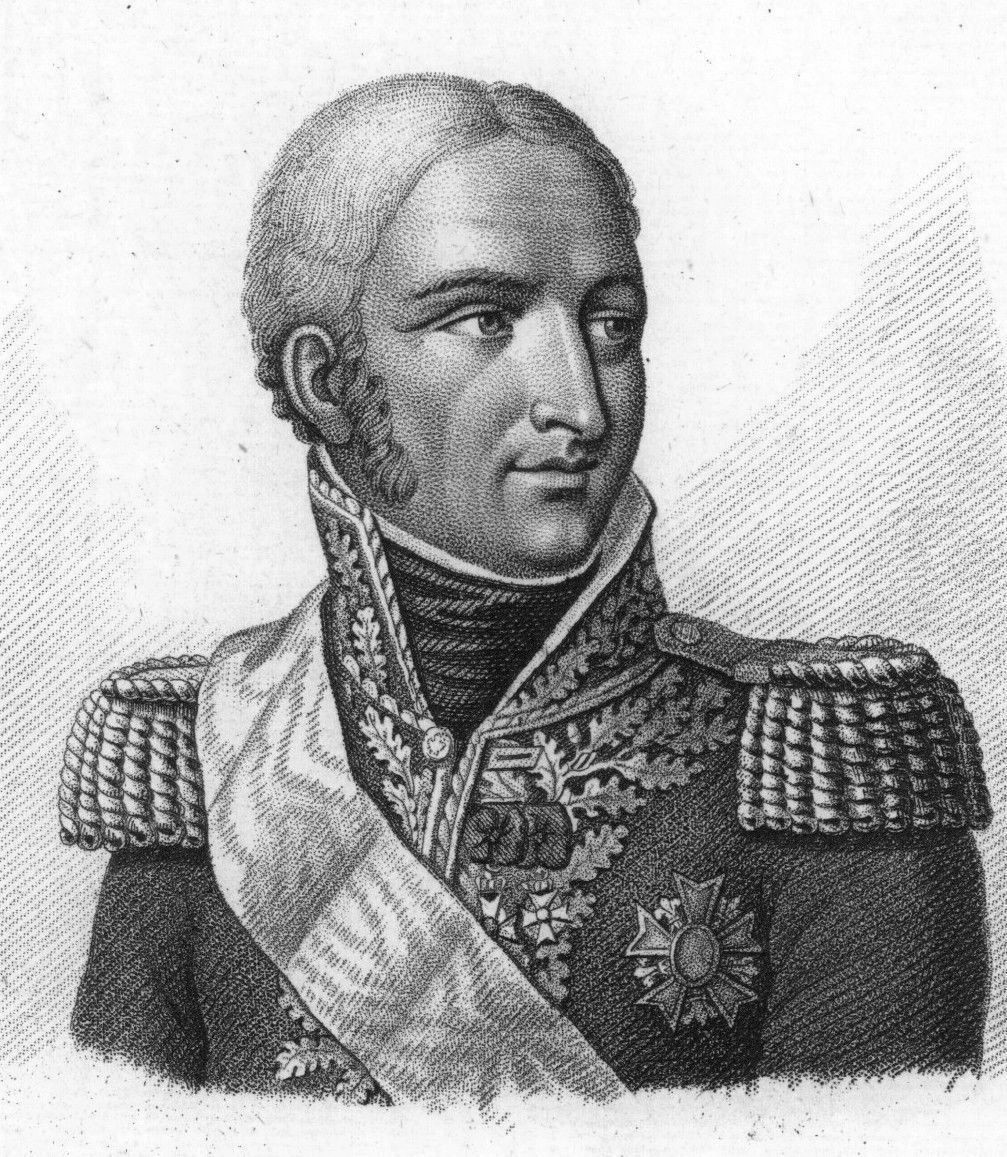
- Engraving of Dessolles by Yan' Dargent (1889)

Prime Minister of France
- In office 29 December 1818 – 19 November 1819
- Monarch: Louis XVIII
- Preceded by: Armand-Emmanuel du Plessis de Richelieu
- Succeeded by: Élie Decazes

Personal details
- Born: 3 July 1767 Auch, Gascony, France
- Died: 3 November 1828 (aged 61) Saulx-les-Chartreux, Essonne, France
- Resting place: Père Lachaise Cemetery
- Party: Doctrinaires
- Profession: Military officer

Military service
- Allegiance: First French Republic; First French Empire; Bourbon Restoration
- Branch/service: French Revolutionary Army; Grande Armée; National Guard
- Years of service: 1792–1814
- Rank: Adjutant general Brigadier general Divisional general Commander-in-chief
- Battles/wars: French Revolutionary Wars; Napoleonic Wars; Peninsular War; Hundred Days

Jean Joseph Dessolles, 1st Marquis Dessolles, born Jean Joseph Paul Augustin Dessolles (French: [ʒɑ̃ ʒozɛf desɔl]; 3 July 1767 – 3 November 1828), was a French soldier and statesman. He was the Prime Minister of France from 29 December 1818 to 18 November 1819.

== Early life ==
Born in Auch, in 1767, he was educated under the direction of his uncle, Irénée-Yves de Solle, who was the Bishop of Digne and later Chambéry.

== Military career ==
=== French Revolutionary Wars ===
Having entered into military service in 1792, he became an Adjutant-General under the command of Napoléon Bonaparte during the Italian campaign of the War of the First Coalition. He soon rose to the rank of Brigadier-General on 31 May 1797.

During the War of the Second Coalition, he served as Chief of Staff to Jean Victor Marie Moreau in the Italian theatre, where he distinguished himself at Noir in 1799. He defeated the Austrians in the Valtellina in 1800, where under his command, French forces killed 1,200, captured 4,000 men, and eighteen pieces of cannon.

He assisted at the Battle of Novi, at the Battles of Sainte-Marie (where he was named Major-General on 13 April 1799, and also at Lodi, where he was honoured with the nickname 'Decius français' (French Decius). He contributed to the French victory of Hohenlinden in 1801, and remained in service up to the Peace of Lunéville.

=== Napoleonic Wars ===
He was named a State Councillor (Conseiller d'État) in ordinary service, attached to the War section, on 30 Frimaire of the year X. In the Year XII, he entered into extraordinary service, and remained a member of the Council of Administration of War (Conseil d'Administration de la Guerre) until 1805.

On 12 Pluviôse of the year XIII, he was named Governor of the Palace of Versailles, and Grand Officer of the Legion of Honour in 1805. He received the provisional command of the Army of Hanover, until he was replaced by Bernadotte. He was then on standby until 1808.

He was disgraced in 1806 for having held hostile intentions against the Emperor, and was taken off the Council List (Liste du Conseil) on 2 February 1806. Napoléon wrote to Fouché on the subject:

Je vous dirais que le général Desolles a tenu en confidence des propos fort extraordinaires qui montreraient l'existence d'une petite clique aussi envenimée que lâche. (I would like to say to you that the general Desolles has taken into confidence very extraordinary intentions which would show the existence of a little clique as poisoned as it is cowardly.) - Correspondence, XI, n° 9088

He thereafter retired to a property that he owned near Auch, the Chartreuse du Pastisse at Preignan.

Eventually winning back imperial favour, he did not return to the State Council (Conseil d'État), and from 1808 to 1810 he commanded a division in Spain, during the Peninsular War.

Prior to the Battle of Talavera (27–28 July 1809), King Joseph left Madrid 23 July, at the head of some 5,800 troops, to meet up with Victor's 23,000 troops, and Sebastiani's 17,500, to take the offensive against Cuesta at Torrijos, rather than letting him advance on Madrid. Left behind was only one brigade of Dessolles's division, with a few Spanish levies, with which Augustin Daniel Belliard, the governor of the city, was expected to hold the capital; some 4,000 men, in all. Belliard had to be prepared to retreat into the Citadel of Madrid, in the Retiro, with his troops and the whole body of the Afrancesados and their families, if there was an insurrection, or if Venegas managed to reach the city from the east, or possibly Wilson, whose column was at Escalona (Toledo), just thirty-eight miles from Madrid, with a force that was believed to be much larger than it actually was. (Note: Wilson's force actually numbered some four thousand troops while the intelligence Victor gave King Joseph referred to between eight and ten thousand troops. (Oman, 1903: 507.))

Dessolles later distinguished himself at the Battle of Ocaña, at the Passage of Sierra Morena, and at Despena-Perros. He also captured Cordoba, where he governed in a manner "to reconcile hearts".

He returned to France in February 1811, and remained until March 1812, when he was named Chief of Staff to Eugène de Beauharnais. In 1812, upon arrival in Smolensk, his health obligated him to return to Paris.

== Political career under the Bourbons ==
On the first restoration of Louis XVIII, in 1814, the provisional government named him Commander-in-Chief of the National Guard and all troops of the 1st Division; the Comte d'Artois named him a member of the Provisional State Council (Conseil d'État provisoire); and the King named him Minister of State, a Peer of France, Major-General of all the National Guards of the Kingdom, Commander of Saint-Louis, and Grand Cordon of the Legion of Honour. These favours were rewards for his efforts convincing Emperor Alexander I of Russia to reject the proposed Habsburg-Bonaparte regency of Empress Marie-Louise, and instead supporting the restoration of the French Bourbons.

He was opposed to the return of Napoléon during the Hundred Days, and pronounced himself in favour of the Bourbons in 1814.

Under the Second Restoration, he pursued a political career. He was appointed Minister of Foreign Affairs and President of the Council (Prime Minister) with the formation of a liberal ministry in December 1818. In November 1819, he retired, disgusted by the demands of the reactionaries. He received public recognition as 'Ministre Honnête Homme' (Gentleman Minister), and was thereafter a supporter of civil liberties.

He died in November 1828, at the Chateau de Monthuchet at Saulx-les-Chartreux (Essonne). He was buried at the Père-Lachaise Cemetery (28th division).

== Family ==
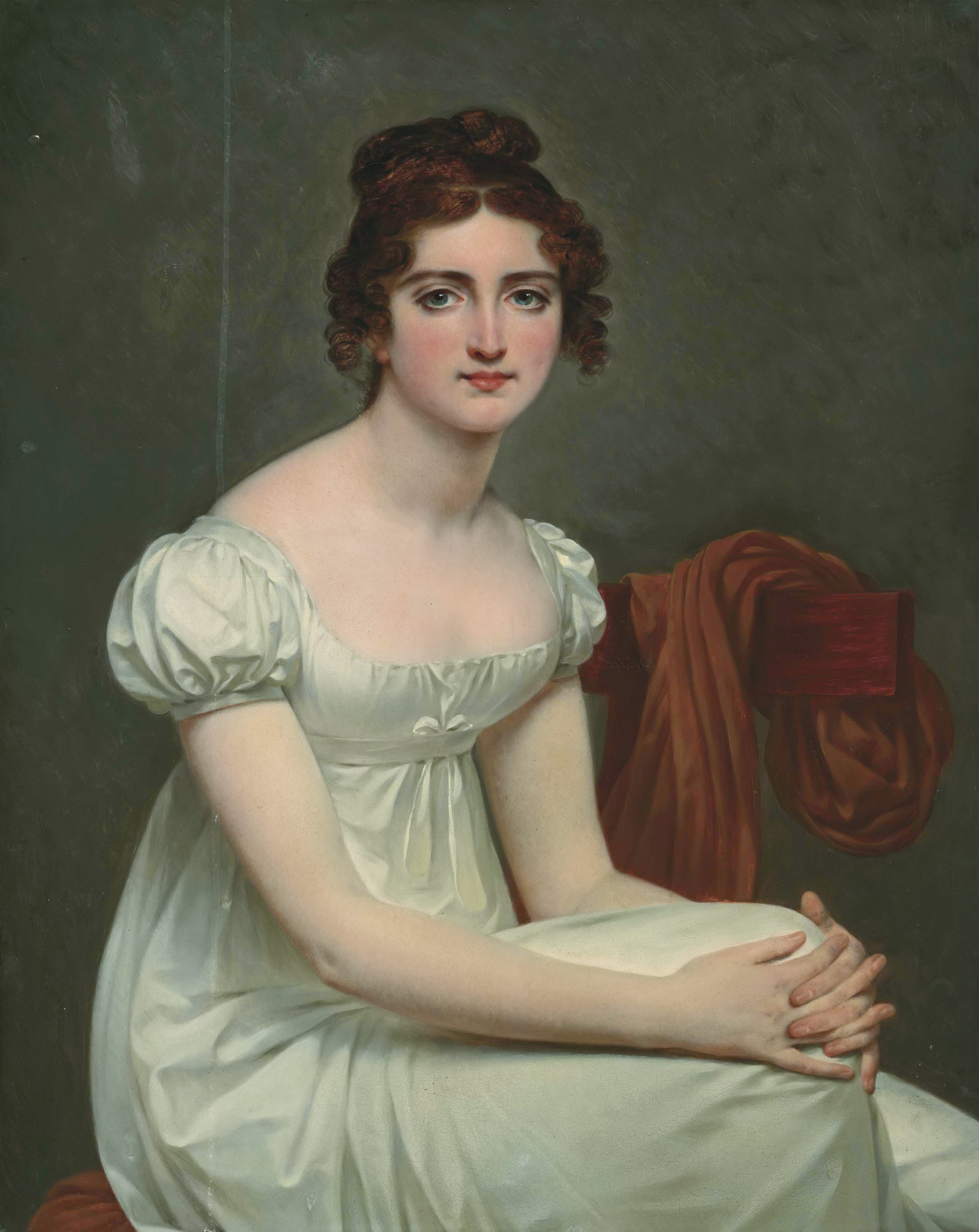
Hélène Charlotte Pauline Dessolles (Antoine-Jean Gros)

From his marriage with Anne Émilie (1777-1852), daughter of General Auguste Marie Henri Picot de Dampierre, he had one daughter, Hélène-Charlotte-Pauline (17 July 1805 – 10 July 1864), who married Alexander Jules de La Rochefoucauld (1796-1856), Duc d'Etissac. He has two grandsons : Roger, duc d’Estissac and Arthur, Comte de La Rochefoucauld (issues the Prince de La Rochefoucauld-Montbel (Dominique and his son Gabriel)). His grand daughter Thérèse married her cousin prince Marcantonio Borghese.

== Honors ==
- He is among the 660 people to have their names engraved under the Arc de Triomphe. It appears on the 15th column as DESSOLES.
- The principal pedestrian road of the historic centre of Auch is named in his honour (Rue Dessoles).

== Notes ==
Political offices
Preceded by Duc de Richelieu	Prime Minister of France; 1818–1819	Succeeded by Comte Decazes
French nobility
Preceded by Title created	Marquis Desolles; 1814 – 1828	Succeeded by Forfeit
