= Ramón Fernando Patiño, 3rd Marquis of Castelar =

Spanish army officer (1753–1817)

- Born: 26 June 1753; Zaragoza, Spain
- Died: 9 January 1817 (aged 63); Málaga, France
- Military career
- Rank: Captain-general
- Conflicts: American Revolutionary War; War of the Pyrenees; War of the Oranges; Peninsular War

Ramón Fernando Patiño Castro Osorio y Mariño (1753–1817) was a Spanish military commander.

== Peninsular War ==
At the outbreak of the war, Castelar was appointed member of the Military Junta and, the following October, captain general of New Castile. At Madrid, he joined General Morla, who had been sent to Madrid as director-general of Artillery and who had started preparing the fortifications of the city, including the mountain passes on its approaches. Together, they were in charge of defending the capital.

However, with Napoleon rapidly approaching with a large force, Castelar abandoned the city, taking some five thousand troops and sixteen cannon with him to join General Heredia and retreat to Talavera de la Reina. Morla, following orders from the Junta of Defence, was left to capitulate to Napoleon on 4 December 1808.
