= Tomás de Morla =

Spanish Army officer (1747–1811)

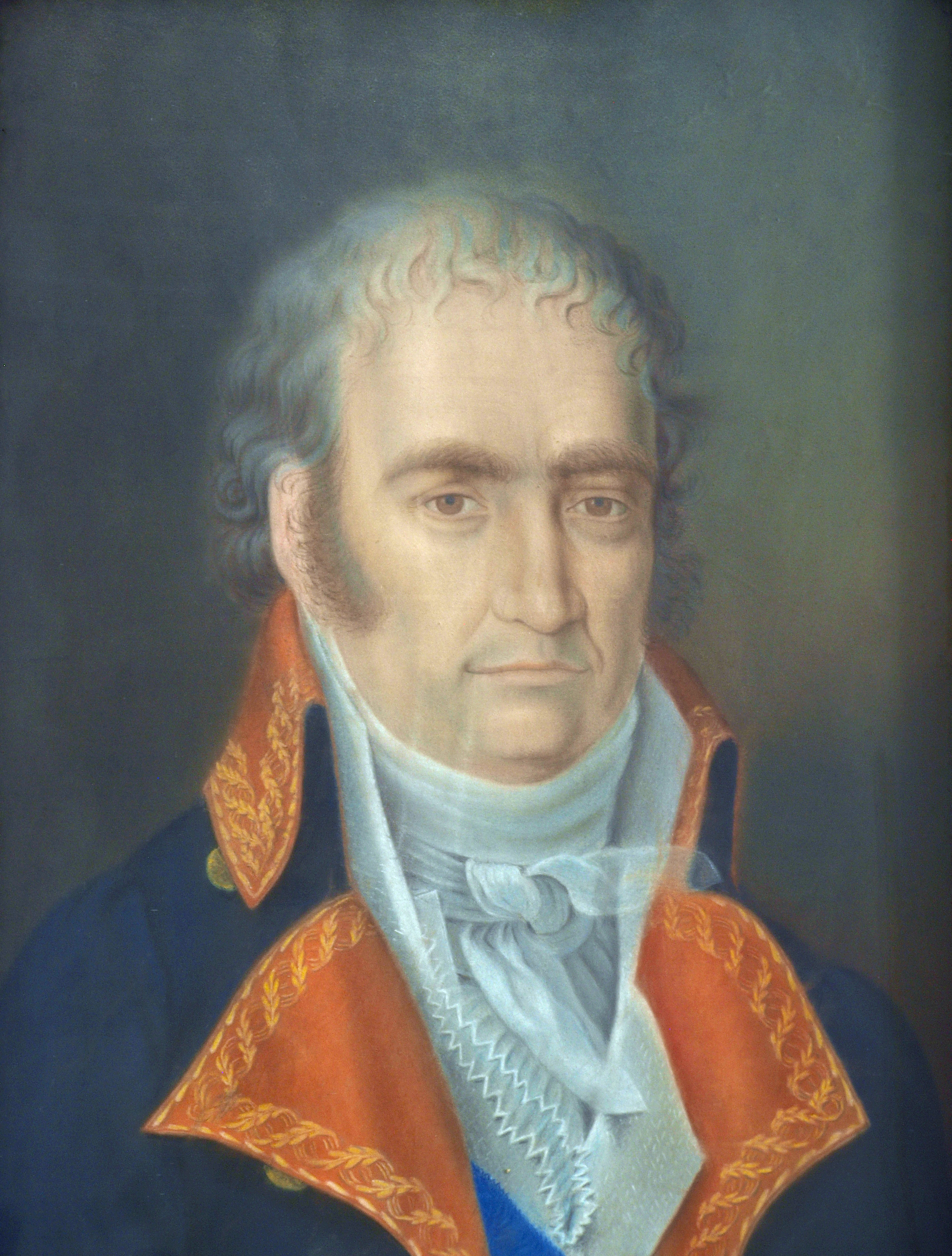
- Portrait of Morla
- Born: 9 July 1747; Jerez de la Frontera, Spain
- Died: 1811 (aged 63–64); Madrid, Spain
- Military career
- Allegiance: Spain
- Branch: Spanish Army
- Service years: 1771–1808
- Rank: Captain general
- Commands: Governor of Cádiz
- Conflicts: American Revolutionary War; Great Siege of Gibraltar; War of the First Coalition; War of the Pyrenees; Peninsular War; Capture of the Rosily Squadron; Battle of Bailén

Captain-General Tomás Bruno de Morla Pacheco (9 July 1747 – 6 December 1811) was a Spanish Army officer who served in the French Revolutionary and Napoleonic Wars.

== Early life ==
Tomás was born in Jerez de la Frontera in 1747. He was the son of Tomas de Morla and Maria Pacheco. He entered the Artillery Academy at Segovia in 1764, graduating the following year as a sub-lieutenant in that institution's first graduating class.

== Career ==
In 1780, during the American Revolutionary War, as a lieutenant of artillery, Morla took part in the Great Siege of Gibraltar, where he was wounded. In 1792, during the French Revolutionary Wars he served in the Army of Rousillon as quartermaster general, serving later in various posts until in 1800 he was appointed governor of Cádiz and captain general of Andalusia. In 1808, following the Dos de Mayo Uprising against the French, Morla took action against a French naval squadron in Cádiz Bay, forcing its surrender in June. The following month he led forces from Cádiz at the Battle of Bailén, when the Spanish army defeated a French advance into Andalusia.

In September 1808, Morla was sent to Madrid as director-general of artillery and a member of the Supreme War Junta. There, he started preparing the fortifications of the city, including the mountain passes on its approaches. Together with the captain general of New Castile, Marquis of Castelar, Morla was in charge of defending the capital. However, with Napoleon rapidly approaching with a large force, the Marquis abandoned the city, taking some five thousand troops and sixteen cannon with him to join General José Heredia y Velarde and retreat to Talavera de la Reina. Following orders from the Junta of Defence, Morla was left to capitulate to Napoleon on 4 December 1808.

While held by the French Morla decided to enter the service of King Joseph Bonaparte, Napoleon's brother, but clashed with the French general Pierre Dupont de l'Étang and later retired from public life. Meanwhile the Junta Suprema had branded him a traitor and stripped him of his awards and appointments. Morla died in Madrid in 1811.

== Writings and scientific studies ==
In the period 1780 to 1792 Morla taught at the Artillery Academy at Segovia (es), and published several works on artillery, fortification, various campaigns. His most notable works were published in 1800 as El arte de fabricar pólvora, a compendium of all aspects of artillery, logistics, tactics, the manufacture and use of gunpowder, which became a textbook at the Segovia Academy.

== Sources ==
- Vega Viguera, Enrique de la. La Singular Vida de Tomas de Morla y Pacheco Militar y Politico Jerezano (pdf) (Spanish)
