= Augustin Daniel Belliard =

French general

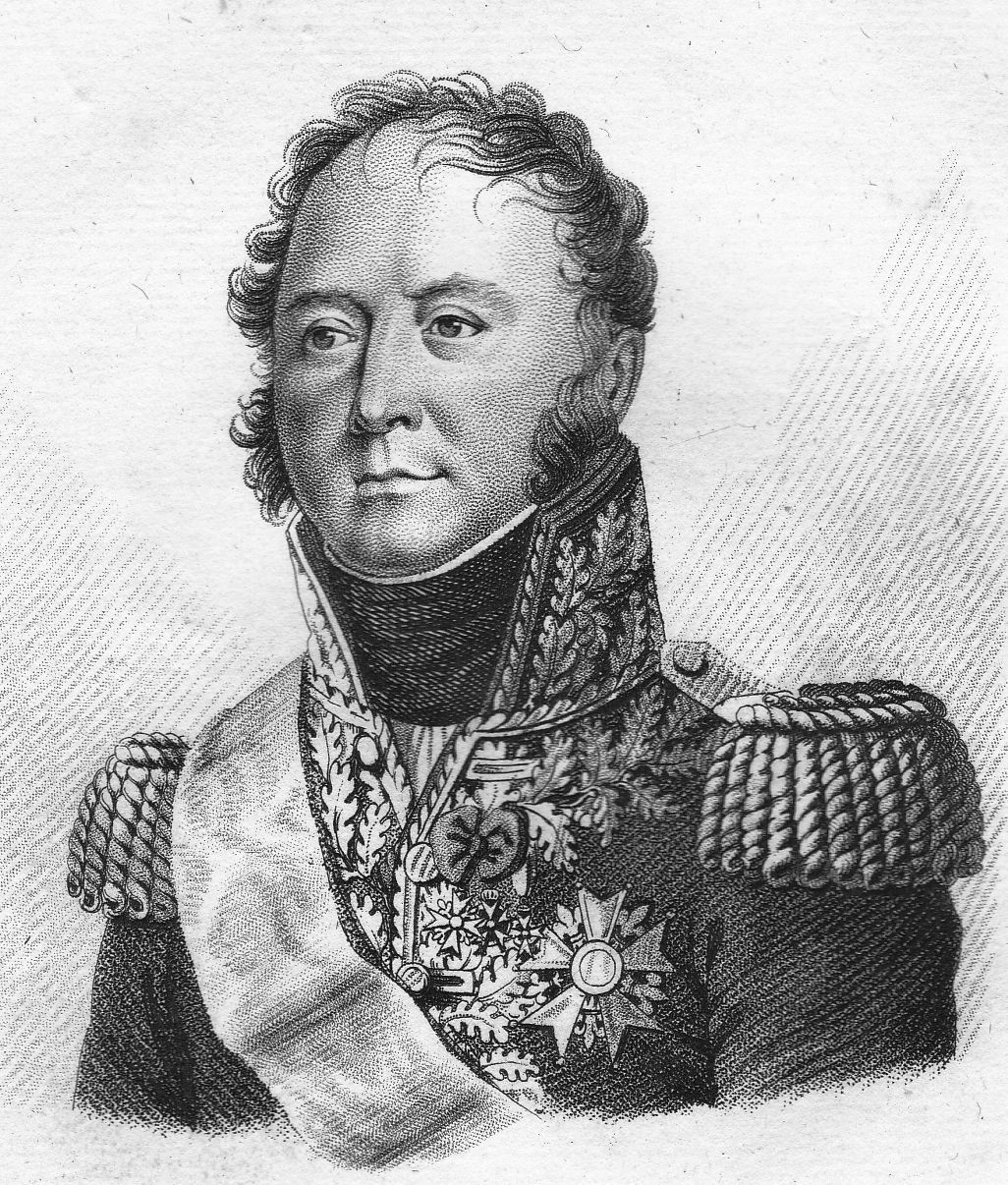
- Born: 25 May 1769; Fontenay-le-Comte, Vendée, France
- Died: 28 January 1832 (aged 62); Brussels, Belgium
- Military career
- Allegiance: French First Republic; First French Empire
- Branch: French Army
- Rank: General
- Conflicts: French Revolutionary Wars; War of the Second Coalition; Napoleonic Wars; Peninsular War; French invasion of Russia
- Awards: Peer of France; Grand Cross of the Legion of Honour; Grand Officer of the Legion of Honour; Knight of the Order of Saint Louis; Order of the Reunion; Order of the Iron Crown

Augustin Daniel Belliard, comte Belliard et de l'Empire (French pronunciation: [oɡystɛ̃ danjɛl bɛljaʁ]; 25 May 1769 in Fontenay-le-Comte, Vendée – 28 January 1832 in Brussels) was a French general.

== Biography ==
=== Revolution ===
Belliard became an officer between 1792 and 1793 under Dumouriez in Belgium. He then fought under Hoche in Italy between 1796 and 1797, near Castiglione, Caldiero, Arcole, and promoted to général de brigade on the 18 November 1796.

A participant of the 1798 Egyptian expedition, he fought in the Battle of the Pyramids, became governor of Upper Egypt, and advanced with his troops into Nubia. He also fought back the enemy cavalry at the battle of Heliopolis. He played a major role in the taking of Boulaq and Cairo. However, with the departure of Napoleon and the arrival of British troops under General Ralph Abercromby the situation changed for the French and the victories ended. After string of British victories Beliard became trapped in Cairo was besieged by a combined British and Ottoman force culminating with Belliard's surrender on 22 June 1801.

=== Empire ===
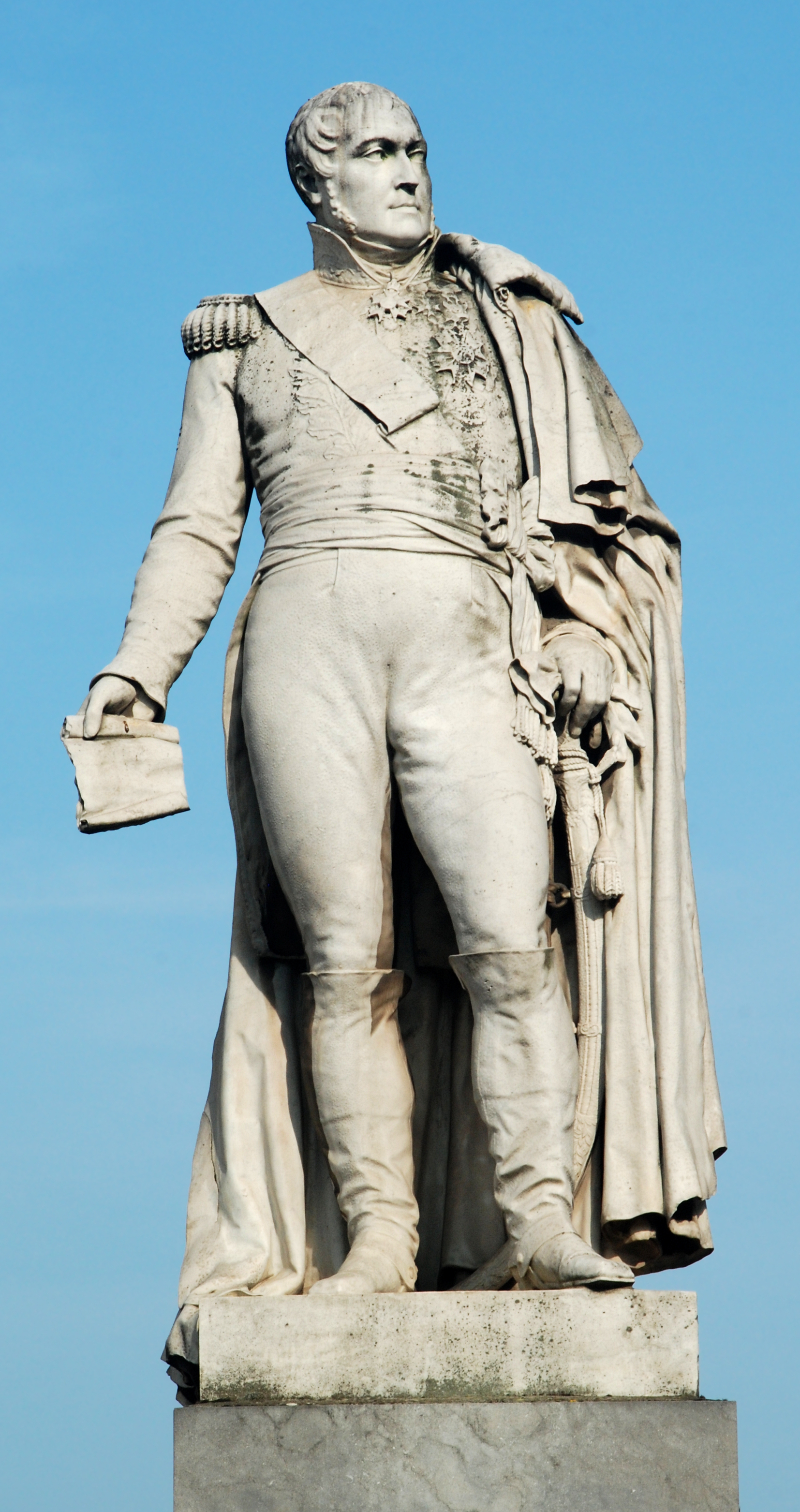
Statue of Belliard (Geefs, 1836) on the Rue Royale/Koningstraat in Brussels

From 1805 to 1807, Belliard fought against Austria, Prussia and Russia, under Joachim Murat.

King Joseph Bonaparte left Madrid with his 5,850-strong reserve on 23 July 1809 to fight at the Battle of Talavera. Wanting to face the combined British and Spanish army with his maximum strength, the king left Belliard, the governor of Madrid, with only about 4,000 troops. Belliard's force consisted of one brigade from the division of Jean-Joseph, Marquis Dessolles, and a few pro-French Spanish troops. Belliard had to be prepared to retreat into the Citadel of Madrid, in the Retiro, with his troops and the whole body of the Afrancesados and their families, if there was an insurrection, or if Venegas managed to reach the city from the east, or possibly Wilson, whose column was at Escalona (Toledo), just thirty-eight miles from Madrid, with a force that was believed to be much larger than it actually was. (Note: Wilson's force actually numbered some four thousand troops while the intelligence Victor gave King Joseph referred to between eight and ten thousand troops. (Oman, 1903: 507.)) After his defeat at Talavera, Joseph ordered Belliard to send away all non-combatants from Madrid and prepare to defend the Retiro. However, Venegas failed to take advantage of his opportunity, Wilson's force was too weak, and the crisis passed.

During the campaign in Saxony of 1813, he fought at Dresden, Leipzig and Hanau, again under Murat. He was severely wounded in the Battle of Craonne in 1814.

After Napoleon abdicated, Louis XVIII awarded him the title Peer of France (Pair de France). When Napoleon returned from Elba in 1815, Belliard became commander of the Mosel forces. After the Battle of Waterloo, he surrendered to Louis XVIII, had his title Pair taken away, was imprisoned for month, but then released and reinstated as Pair in 1819.

The Rue Belliard/Belliardstraat in Brussels is named after him, as is a street in Antwerp.
