= Robledillo de la Jara =

Coordinates: 40°57′N 3°31′W

- Municipality
- Flag Coat of arms

- Municipal location within the Community of Madrid.
- Country: Spain
- Autonomous community: Community of Madrid

Population (2025-01-01)
  - Total: 118
- Time zone: UTC+1 (CET)
  - Summer (DST): UTC+2 (CEST)

Robledillo de la Jara is a municipality of the Community of Madrid, Spain. It has an area of 20.35 km ² with a population of 130 people and a density of 6.39 inhabitants per km ².
