= Cervera de Buitrago =

Coordinates: 40°55′N 3°32′W

- Municipality
- Flag Coat of arms

- Municipal location within the Community of Madrid.
- Country: Spain
- Autonomous community: Community of Madrid

Area
  - Total: 4.64 sq mi (12.02 km^{2})
- Elevation: 3,005 ft (916 m)

Population (2025-01-01)
  - Total: 165
- Time zone: UTC+1 (CET)
  - Summer (DST): UTC+2 (CEST)

Cervera de Buitrago is a municipality of the autonomous community of Madrid in central Spain. It belongs to the comarca of Sierra Norte.

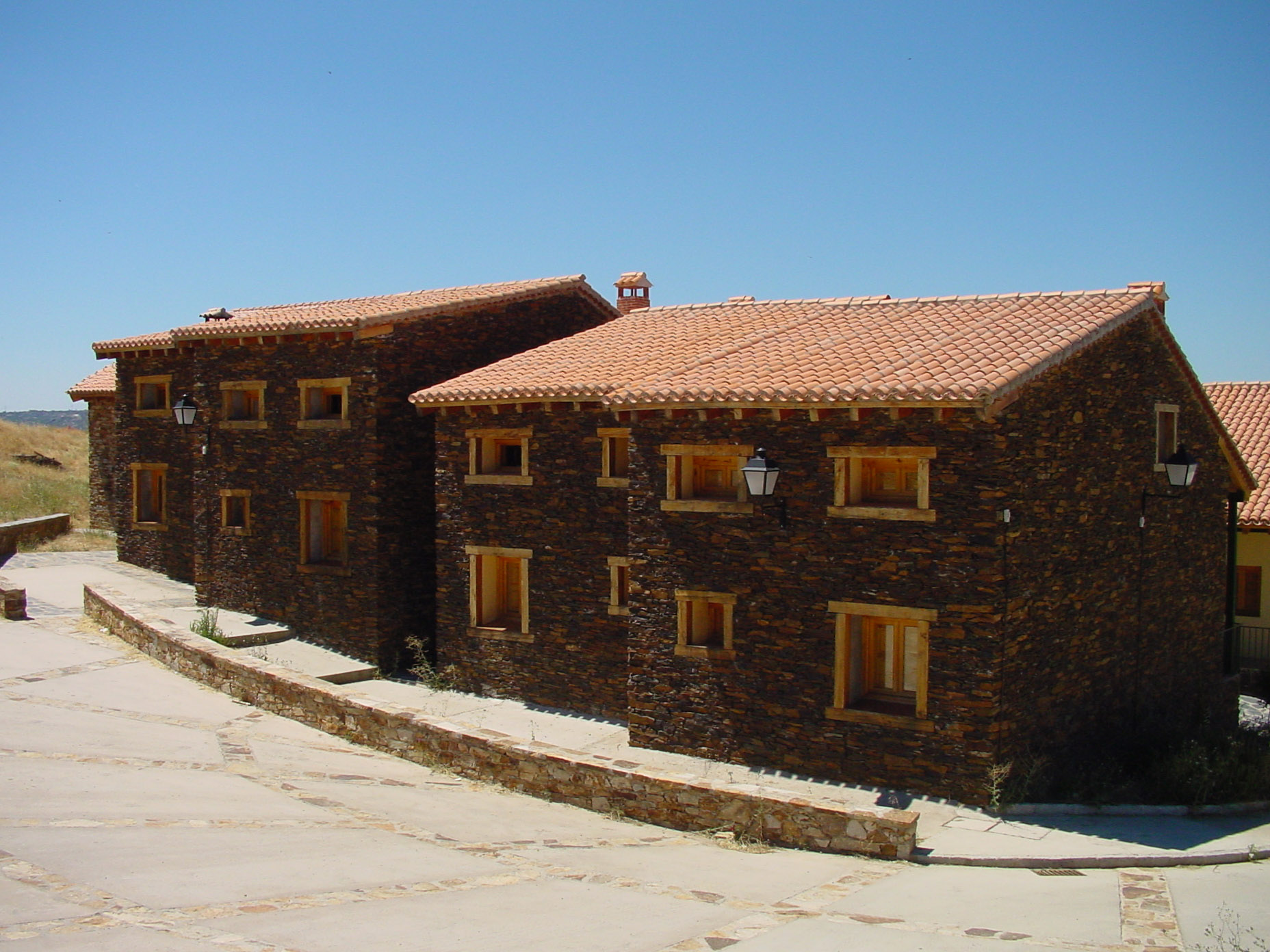
Houses in Cervera de Buitrago

== Local curiosities ==
The village has been occasionally mentioned in journalism and literature devoted to curiosities for a reported high frequency of polydactyly among its inhabitants, whereby six or seven fingers are found per hand or foot. Fantastical literature also mentions UFO activity in the area.
