= La Hiruela =

- Municipality
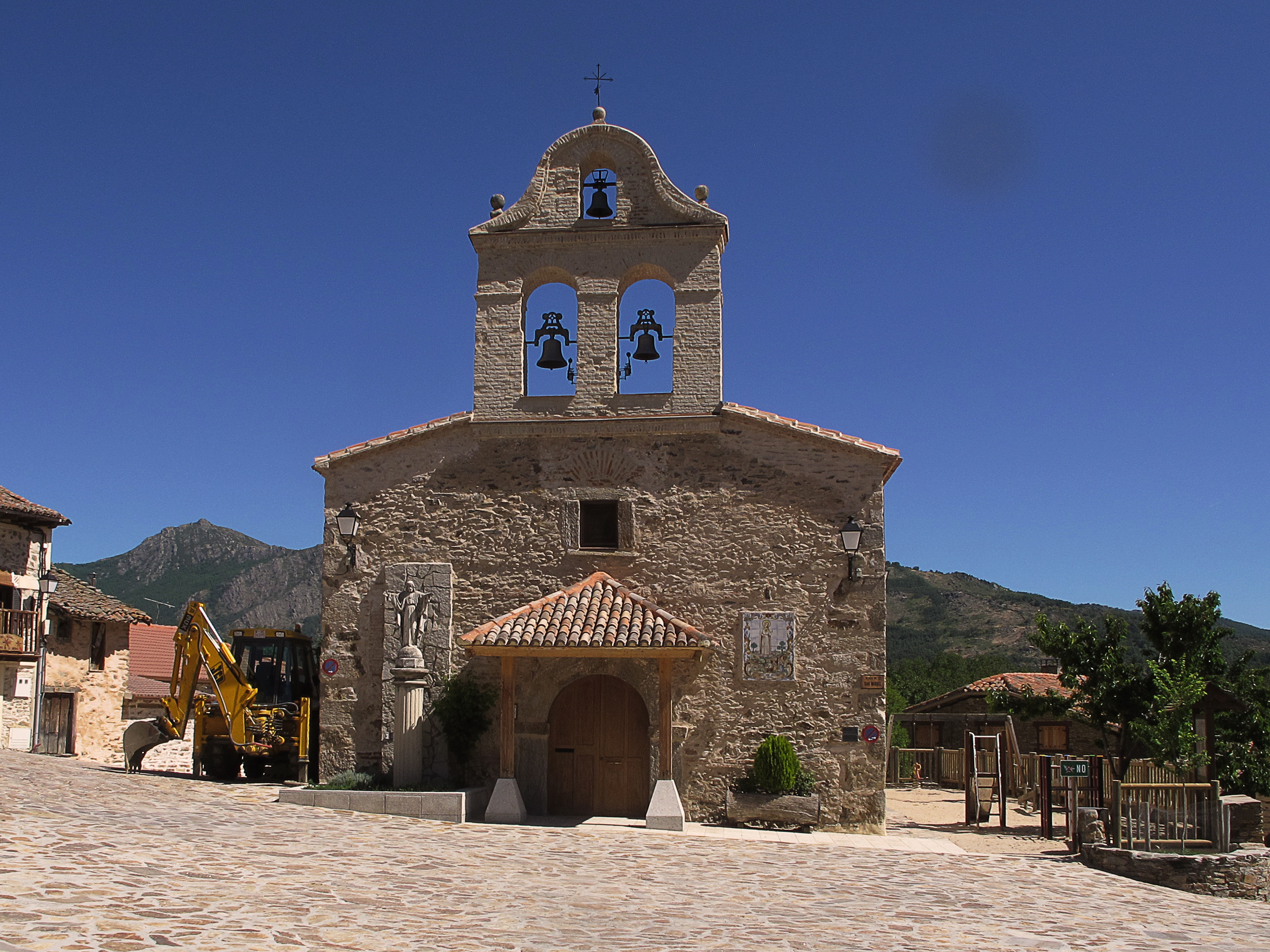

- Flag Coat of arms

- Municipal location within the Community of Madrid

- Location in Spain
- Coordinates: 41°05′N 3°27′W
- Country: Spain
- Autonomous community: Community of Madrid

Population (2025-01-01)
  - Total: 88
- Time zone: UTC+1 (CET)
  - Summer (DST): UTC+2 (CEST)

La Hiruela is a municipality of the Community of Madrid, Spain. With a population of 75 inhabitants (INE 2022), in 2017 it was the third least populated municipality in the province.

== Demography ==
With an area of 17.18 km^{2} and a population of 65 inhabitants, the population density in the municipality is 3.78 inhab/km^{2} (2018). In 2020 it was the third least populated municipality in the Community of Madrid.
