= Puebla de la Sierra =

- Municipality
- Flag Coat of arms

- Municipal location within the Community of Madrid.
- Coordinates: 41.4333°N 3.4333°W
- Country: Spain
- Autonomous community: Community of Madrid

Area
  - Total: 57.7 km^{2} (22.3 sq mi)
- Elevation: 1,163 m (3,816 ft)

Population (2025-01-01)
  - Total: 98
- Time zone: UTC+1 (CET)
  - Summer (DST): UTC+2 (CEST)

Puebla de la Sierra is a municipality of the Community of Madrid, Spain.
