= Somosierra (mountain pass) =

Mountain pass in Madrid, Spain

Coordinates: 41°8′6″N 3°34′52″W

Somosierra is a mountain pass in the Sierra de Guadarrama north of Madrid in Spain. It connects the north of the Community of Madrid with the east of the province of Segovia. Just south of the pass is the municipality of Somosierra with a population of 77.

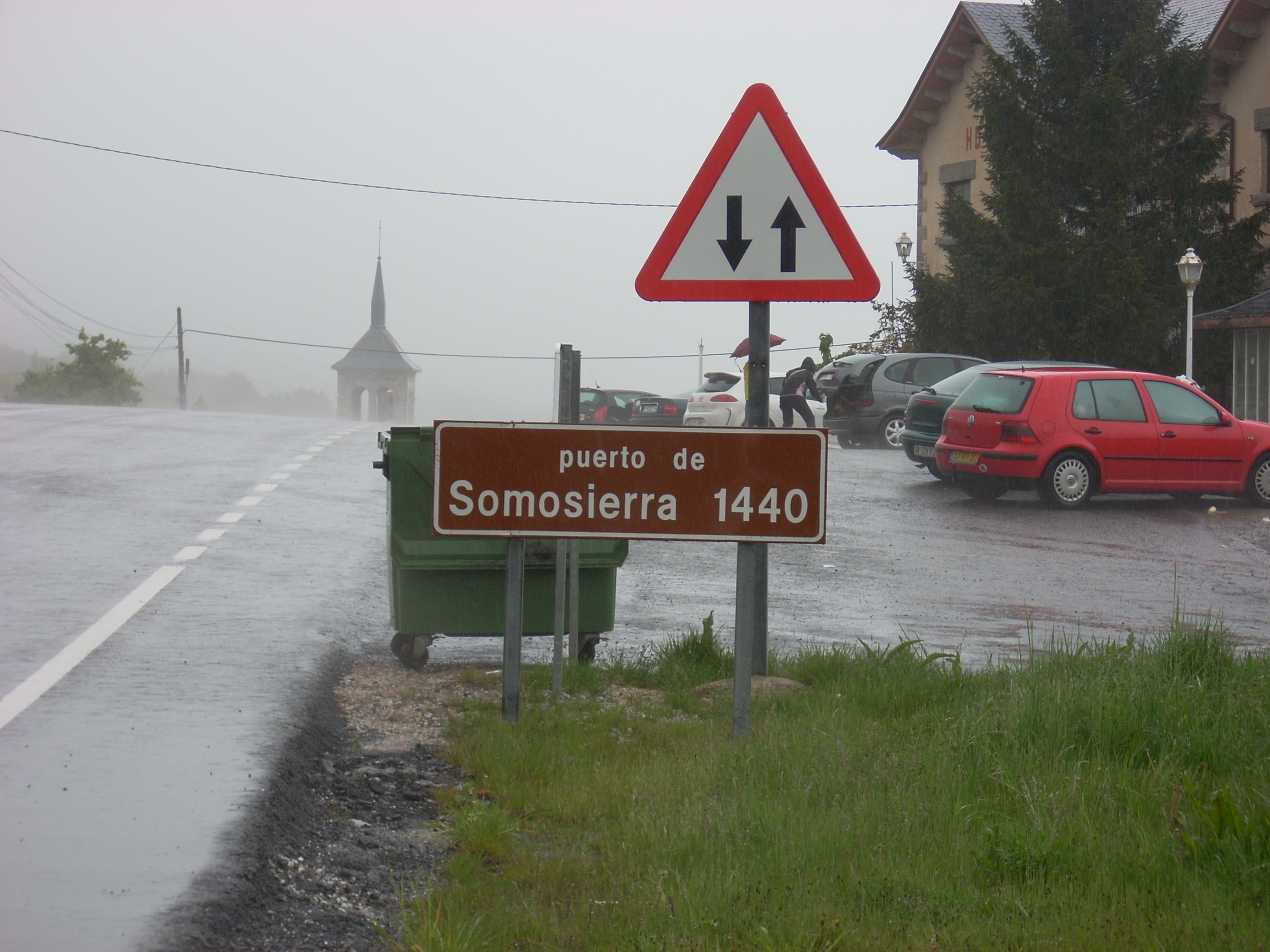
Somosierra Pass

It has an altitude of 1,434 metres (4,705 ft) and is crossed by the A-1 (E5) road through Túnel Juan Manuel Morón Garcia, a short twin-bore tunnel named in honour of a civil engineer who worked on the Spanish motorway network. There is also a 3.9-kilometre-long (2.4 mi) rail tunnel.

== History ==
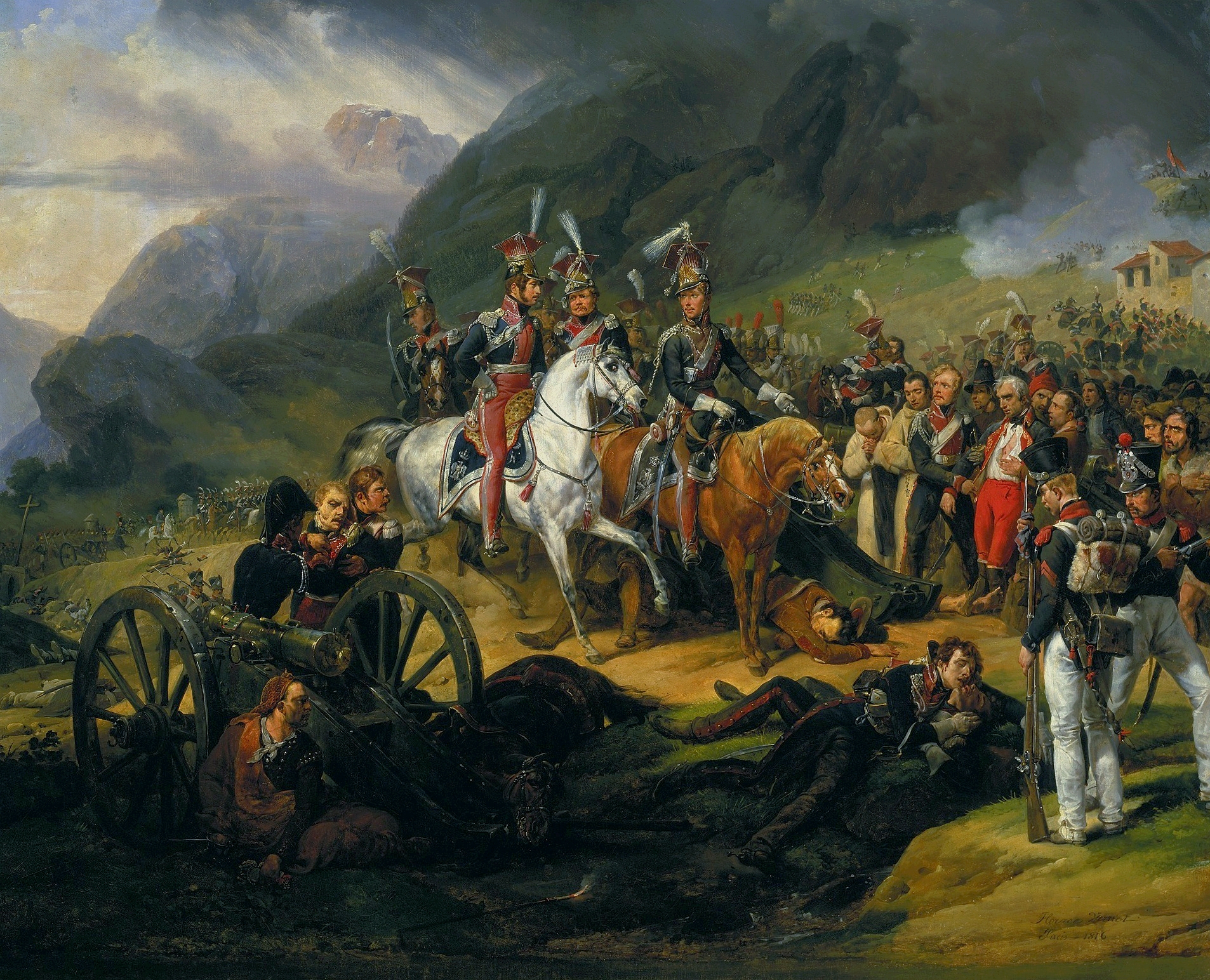
The Battle of Somosierra by Horace Vernet, 1816

The road was originally a track opened up by Napoleon to provide a direct route to Madrid. In 1808 this led to the Battle of Somosierra between French-Polish and Spanish forces.

In 1936, at the beginning of the Spanish Civil War, the Battle of Somosierra (1936) took place in the heights of the pass between Carlist and Falangist units and Spanish Republican Army troops.
