= The Link (retailer) =

UK communications retailer

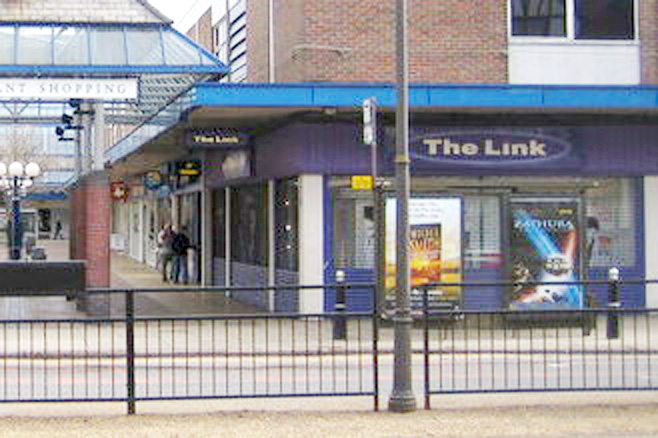
- Dunstable branch in April 2006
- Industry: Mobile phone retailer
- Founded: October 1994
- Defunct: 21 June 2006 (stores); September 2010 (internet)
- Fate: Stores: Renamed (2006); Web: Closed (2010)
- Successor: O2 (retail stores)
- Headquarters: United Kingdom
- Products: Mobile Phones, Mobile Broadband, Mobile Services & Portable Consumer Electronics
- Parent: Dixons Retail
- Website: Official consumer site at the Wayback Machine (archived 2007-09-08)

The Link was an internet based mobile phone and communications retailer in the United Kingdom. It was owned by Dixons Retail, the United Kingdom's largest consumer electronics retail group, and operated online with a dedicated retail website, which in addition to mobile phones also offered satellite navigation systems and broadband Internet services.

The brand was previously used for a chain of mobile phone retail stores, which (from 1997) were 60% owned by DSGi, and 40% owned by O2, the telecommunications company. At the time of The Link's retail store operation, O2 was a subsidiary of BT Group, but the network is now owned by Telefónica of Spain.

In June 2006, the retail store network was taken over by O2; The Link's website, which remains owned by DSG, continued to trade independently of the stores. In September 2010, The Link website went offline, and ceased taking new orders, directing customers to visit the site of sister firm Currys.

== History ==
DSG International opened the first branch of The Link in October 1994, due to the demand for mobile phones and other communications products. DSG International also sells mobile phones in its Currys Digital (formerly Dixons) and Currys chains, but opened a separate chain to provide more capacity for the growth in mobile phone sales. In 2004, the managing director Nick Wood left The Link to become managing director of Dixons. He was replaced by Dixons Group marketing services director Elizabeth Fagan.

By August 2005, there were 295 branches of The Link, spread across the United Kingdom. The Link's annual sales from 2004 to 2005 were £428 million. In September 2005, DSGi said they were open to offers for new owners of The Link as O2 would not sell their share.

The Link also replaced their long running advertising campaign (featuring a specially rerecorded version of "Speak Easy" by Shed Seven) with new comedy sketches, featuring the Ken and Kenneth characters from The Fast Show, filmed inside the Waltham Cross store of The Link. A new logo was created, and the in store look was dramatically overhauled. "Music" was seen as the main focus of The Link from that point, according to Nick Wood, and he hoped that would turn the fortunes around.

=== O2 buys out DSGi share ===
On 21 June 2006, DSGi sold their 60% share of The Link to O2 for £30 million. The deal included all of The Link's stores. O2's purchase of The Link meant that some stores were rebranded as O2, whilst non retained sites were sold to others.

Shortly after DSGi selling its share of the company, Fagan left the company in September 2006 to become managing director of Boots Opticians and Nick Wood returned. Wood quickly made his mark, applying an easier to understand commission structure, placing "live" models of phones in stores, and expanded the product range to include MP3 players and Satellite navigation systems.

Overall, of the 295 Link stores, around half were rebranded as O2, with the majority of the remainder being sold to competing telecoms retailers such as Orange, T-Mobile, Phones 4U, and 3, with three in particular being able to expand their previously smaller store network significantly with a number of former Link sites. In some cases, such as the Bexleyheath Shopping Centre, O2 moved from their own previous site to the Link site, and released their previous store to another operator, in the case of Bexleyheath, this was 3.

A small percentage of sites were closed or sold to non mobile phone related companies, such as Costa Coffee. The majority of Link staff in these stores remained employed by the new store owners, under Transfer of Undertakings (2006) United Kingdom regulations.

=== Online only trading ===
By 31 January 2007, The Link brand was no longer on the high street and became an internet brand. TheLink.com and TheLink.co.uk were retained by DSGi following the sale of the physical business to O2.

The websites continued selling pay monthly and pay as you go mobile phones on Orange, T-Mobile, Vodafone, Virgin Mobile and Three, as well as mobile broadband and mobile services. The Link also offered a range of portable consumer electronics, such as iPods, Sat Navs and Laptops, as well as LCD televisions; these products were available either as gift incentives with mobile phone contracts, or for separate purchase.

In September 2010, The Link website went offline, and was replaced with a link to the Currys webpage.

== Competition ==
The Link's main competitors were Phones 4U, Carphone Warehouse and Dial-a-Phone, who offered a variety of networks to their customers.

The Link also had competition from the networks' own shops, namely 3, O2, Orange, T-Mobile, Vodafone and Virgin Mobile, as well as prepay competition from the likes of Woolworths, Comet and Argos. This was the reason for the late adoption of Vodafone, as a post-pay network, which did not take place until 2002, as announced in November 2001.
