= Dixons Retail =

Consumer electronics retailer (1937–2012)

Dixons Retail plc
- Type: Public limited company
- Traded as: Many brands including Dixons
- Industry: Retail
- Predecessor: Dixons (1937–2012)
- Founded: October 1937
- Defunct: 6 August 2014
- Fate: Merged with Carphone Warehouse
- Successor: Dixons Carphone (now Currys)
- Headquarters: Acton, London, before which Hemel Hempstead (from 1993)
- Key people: Lord Kalms (Life President); John Allan (Chairman); Sebastian James (CEO from 2012)
- Products: Brown goods White goods Telecommunications; Information Technology; Cameras; Consumer Electronics
- Brands: Dixons Travel; Dixons (brand); Currys Digital
- Revenue: £8.213 billion (2013)
- Operating income: £136.0 million (2013)
- Net income: £168.1 million (2013)
- Number of employees: 33,000 (2014)
- Parent: Currys plc (intellectual properties)

Dixons Retail plc was one of the largest consumer electronics retailers in Europe, which merged with Carphone Warehouse in 2014 to create Dixons Carphone, which was renamed Currys plc in 2021. In the United Kingdom, the company operated Currys, Currys Digital, PC World (with stores increasingly dual-branded Currys PC World), Dixons Travel and its service brand Knowhow.

At the time of the merger in 2014, Dixons Retail had 530 outlets in the United Kingdom and Ireland and 322 in Northern Europe. Its Nordic and central European business was operated under the Elkjøp umbrella, and it also operated Kotsovolos in Greece. The company was listed on the London Stock Exchange and was a constituent of the FTSE 250 Index.

The company, formerly known as Dixons Group plc and later DSG International plc, specialised in selling mass market technology consumer electronics products, audio video equipment, PCs, small and large domestic appliances, photographic equipment, communication products and related financial and after-sales services such as extended service agreements, product set-up and installation, and repairs.

== History ==
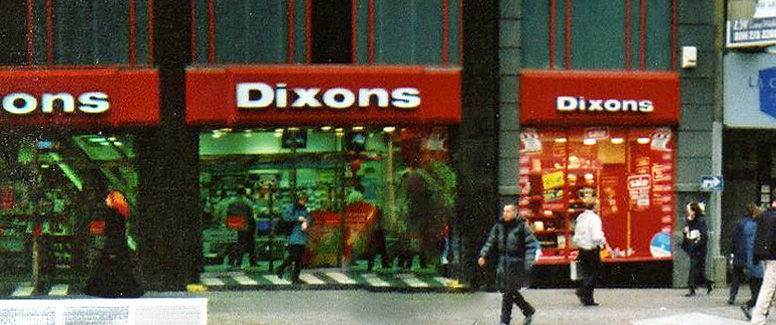
A Dixons store in Sheffield in 2000

=== Early years ===
Dixons was founded as a photographic studio by Charles Kalms and Michael Mindel in High Street in Southend under the name of Dixons Studios Limited, a company registered in October 1937 with a share capital of £100. The name Dixons, selected randomly from the telephone directory, was sufficiently short to fit above the small shop front. In the early 1940s, Dixons set up seven studios around London but by the end of the Second World War the business had been reduced to a single studio in Edgware. Stanley Kalms, the son of the founder, joined the business in 1948 and started advertising direct sales in the press, with postal ordering and delivery.

In 1950, the company began to sell cameras. In 1957, it opened a head office to house the staff now dealing with 60,000 mail order customers and to centralise buying.

Dixons was first listed on the London Stock Exchange in 1962, changing its name at that time to Dixons Photographic Limited. It bought out competitors Ascotts in 1962, and Bennetts in 1964. In 1967, Dixons bought an 85,000 sq ft (7,900 m^{2}) colour film processing laboratory in Stevenage. Charles Kalms was succeeded by his son Stanley in 1971. In 1972, Dixons bought another competitor, Wallace Heaton, and in 1974, it opened its Stevenage distribution centre.

=== 1980s and 1990s ===
In 1984, Dixons acquired Currys, a retail chain with 570 shops selling electrical and other household goods; Currys retained its separate brand identity.

In February 1993, Dixons bought Vision Technology Group (VTG), operating under the PC World brand at Croydon, Lakeside Shopping Centre, Brentford and Staples Corner. Later that year, the company sold VTG's mail order division, Dixons US Holdings Inc and Supasnaps. The company opened its first duty free store at Heathrow Terminal 3 in 1994, and later that year launched phone store The Link, the company's first venture into communications. The head office moved to Hemel Hempstead.

In November 1996, Dixons bought DN Computer Services, a computer reseller business. It also acquired the retail assets of Harry Moore Ltd, an Irish electrical retailer. Cellnet bought a 40% stake in The Link in April 1997. Also that year, the Dixons website was launched. In 1998, Freeserve, a free Internet service, was launched; it was later sold to France Telecom and renamed Wanadoo. Dixons bought Elkjøp, a Norwegian retailer, in November 1999.

=== 2000s ===
In October 2002, Dixons bought UniEuro, an Italian-based electrical retailer, and Genesis Communications, a mobile phone service provider. The company opened its first Electro World store in Hungary in February 2002. In October 2005, Dixons Group plc changed its name to DSG International plc.

Further potential expansion came in April 2005, when DSGi bought an interest in Eldorado Group, the largest electrical retailer in Russia and Ukraine, with an option to buy the rest by 2011 for US$1.9 billion (about £1 billion GBP). This option was not pursued, DSGi withdrawing their interest in April 2007.

In May 2006, DSGi was awarded the Queen's Award for Enterprise. The company announced that the Dixons brand would continue purely online and that all high street stores would be rebranded Currys.digital. DSGi also bought 75% of Fotovista, a French photographic business. In January 2008, DSGi announced that it would stop selling analogue televisions and only sell integrated digital televisions, in an effort to get consumers ready for the digital switchover.

In May 2008, DSGi announced that it would close 77 of its 177 Currys.digital shops in the United Kingdom, as their building leases expired over the following five years.

=== 2010s ===
In May 2010, the company secured almost exclusive rights to sell the Apple iPad. In June 2010, DSGi changed its name to Dixons Retail plc.

=== Merger with Carphone Warehouse ===
In May 2014, Dixons announced a merger, that soon came to pass, with Carphone Warehouse; the combined company would have market capitalisation of around £3.8 billion. Dixons thus became a wholly owned subsidiary of Dixons Carphone Holdings Limited, and was renamed to Dixons Retail Group plc. Sebastian James, who had been Dixons CEO since 2012, was appointed as CEO of Dixons Carphone.

== Operations ==
As of 2014, Dixons had 530 outlets in the United Kingdom and Ireland, and 322 in northern Europe. The company is structured according to the international locations of its businesses and brands, as detailed below:

=== United Kingdom and Ireland ===
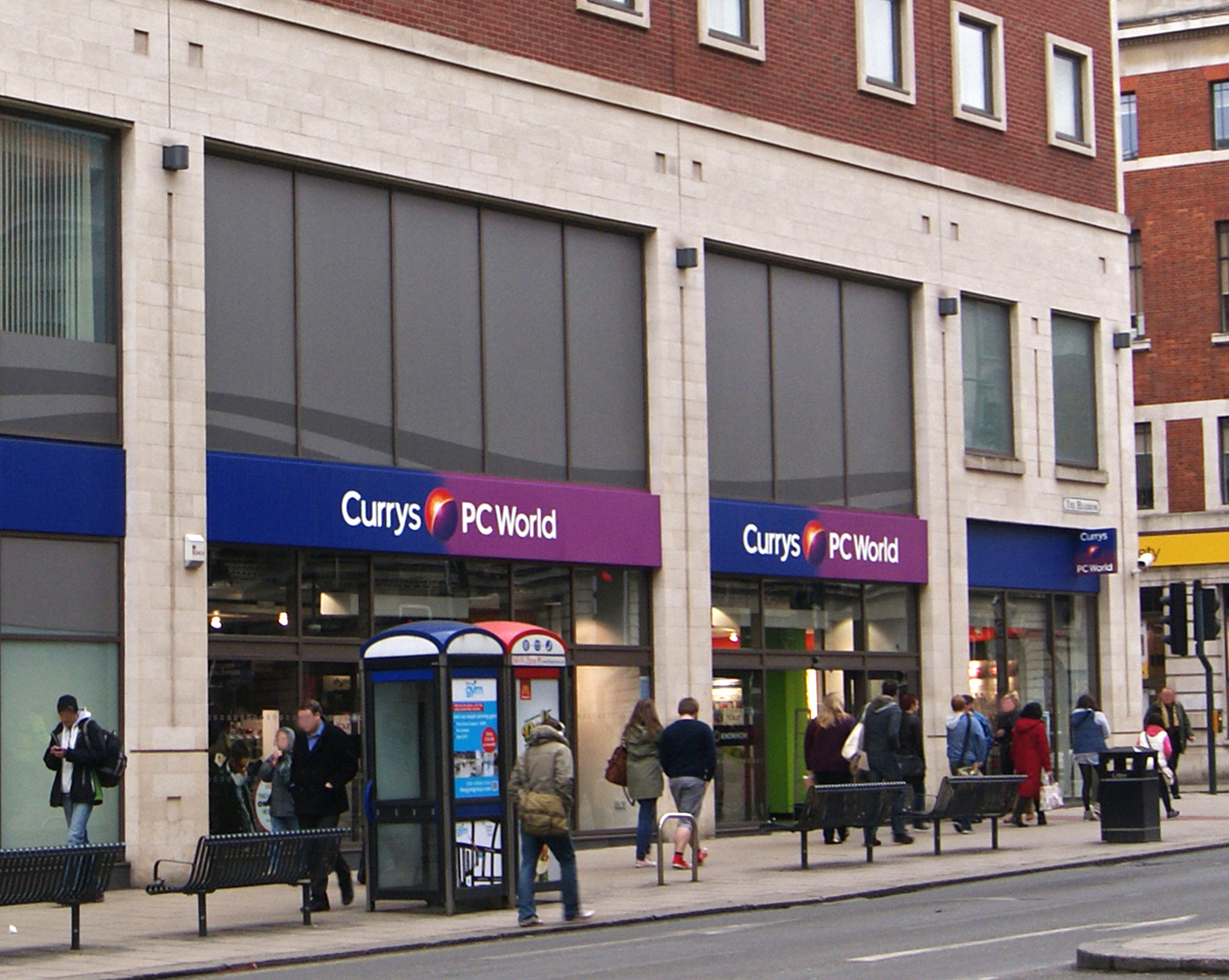
Dual branded "Currys PC World" store in Leeds

Brands comprise (40% of sales, largest market share in United Kingdom and Ireland):

- Currys / PC World – specialises in home electronics and household appliances.
- Team KnowHow – a provider of after-sales product support and cover.
- Dixons Travel – a retailer operating in the main airports in the United Kingdom and Dublin International Airport in the Republic of Ireland.
- DSGi Business – a specialist provider of IT solutions to business and the public sector.

=== Northern Europe ===
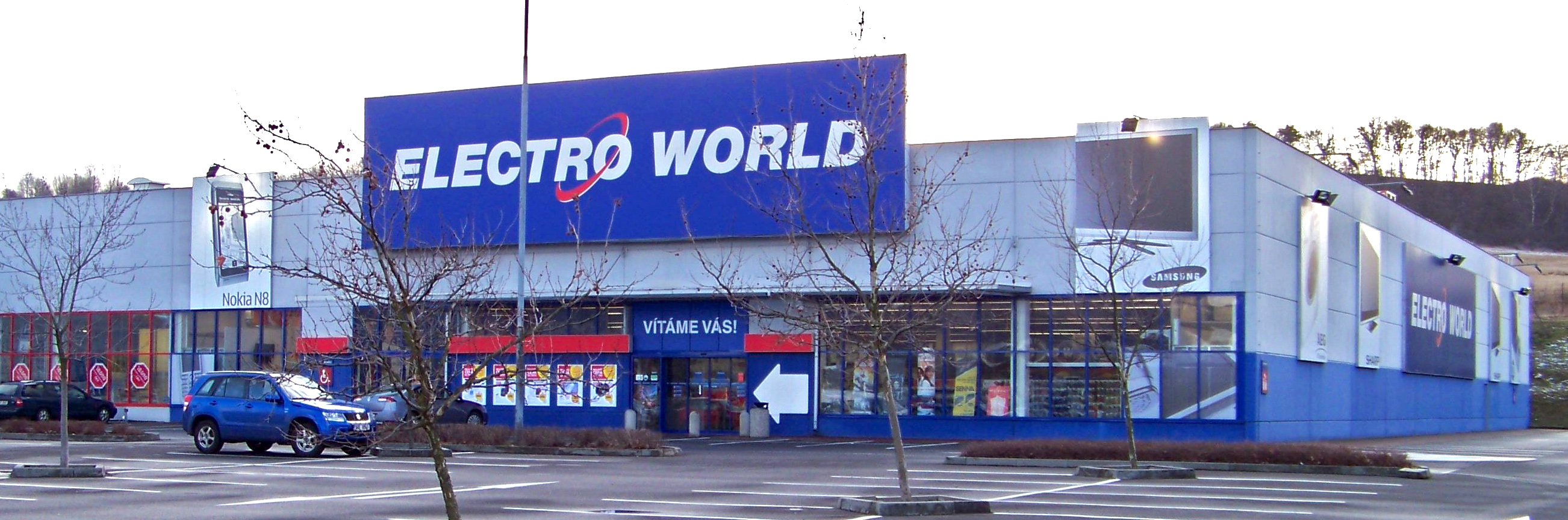
Electro World store in Ústí nad Labem, Czech Republic

Brands comprise (32% of sales, largest market share in Nordic countries and Czech Republic):

- Elgiganten – ("Electrical Giant") sells home electronics and household appliances in Denmark and Sweden.
- Elkjøp – ("Electrical Buy") sells home electronics and household appliances in Norway.
- Elko – sells home electronics and appliances in Iceland.
- Gigantti – ("Giant") sells home electronics and household appliances in Finland.
- Electro World – electrical superstores in the Czech Republic. The Polish Electro World chain is no longer owned by Dixons.

=== Southern Europe ===
Brands comprise (13% of sales, largest market share in Greece):

- Κωτσόβολος ("Kotsovolos") – sells home electronics in Greece.

== Product brands ==
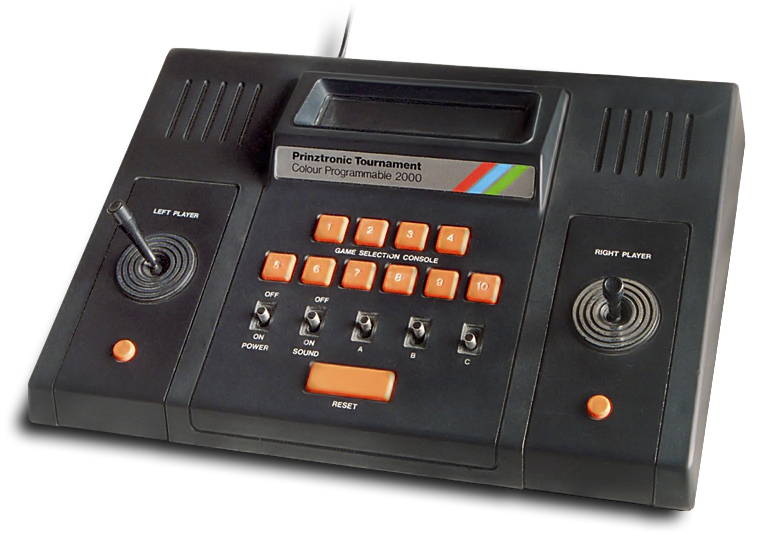
Prinztronic branded games console.

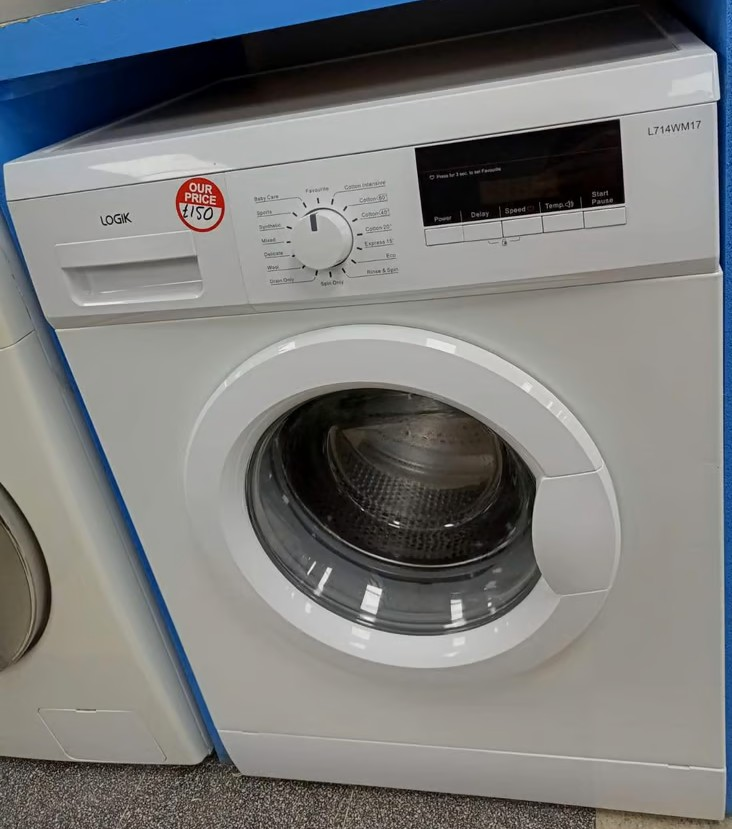
A Logik branded washing machine

Dixons Retail used a number of own brand names for products sold in its stores. The following were still in use as of 2013:

- Essentials – Includes Currys Essentials and PC World Essentials.
- Logik – Registered as a trademark since 1989. Intended for everyday use with an "emphasis on reliability and efficiency" and "a better value alternative to the major name brands without compromising on performance."
- Advent – Established PC World brand used for computers, peripherals and other accessories.
- Sandstrøm – Intended to compete with higher end consumer electronics brands, Sandstrøm is claimed to be "inspired by Scandinavian design [and] designed to combine aesthetics with performance."
- Goji – Producer of equipment including computers, smartphones and audio products as well as bags and storage. Distributed by Dixons Group.

Other brands formerly used by the company included:

- Prinz/Prinzsound/Prinztronic – The Prinz brand was first used on Japanese manufactured goods during Dixons' 1950s expansion.
- Miranda – Originally the name of a Japanese company, Dixons acquired the brand in 1981, and used it on cameras and photographic kit. As of 2011, Dixons still owned rights to the name, but no longer used it and planned to sell it off.

Saisho brand logo

- Saisho – Introduced in 1982. Dixons announced its intention to sell the brand off in May 2011.

1980s Matsui logo with the pseudo-Japanese "rising sun" symbol

- Matsui – Introduced in the 1980s by Currys as a brand for its consumer electronics goods assembled in the United Kingdom, using imported components. Products in the Matsui line involved neither Japanese parts nor Japanese labour, but were branded with a Japanese sounding name, a rising sun symbol and the motto "Japanese Technology Made Perfect"'. The brand was retired in 2010 as part of the company's rationalisation of own labels.
- Carlton – was used by Currys for own brand white goods.

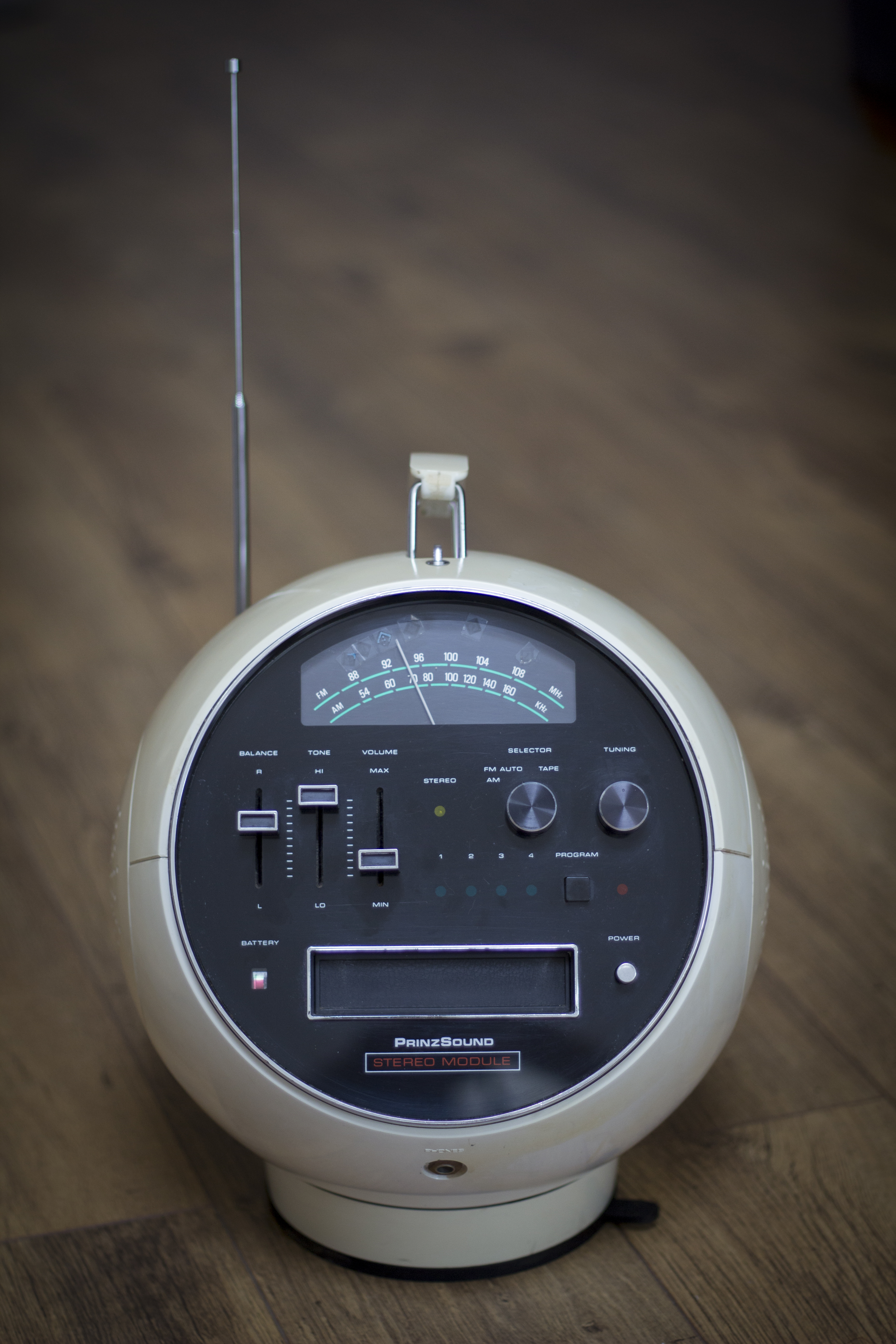
A Prinzsound SM8, sold in the United States under the Weltron brand

== Former businesses ==
Businesses formerly owned by or associated with Dixons include:

- Mastercare Commercial Services, a business operating from a call centre offering IT services to IT businesses, which has since been rebranded as Knowhow.
- Freeserve, an internet service provider, which was purchased by France Télécom and rebranded as Wanadoo in December 2000 (eventually rebranded/merged into Orange).
- The Link, a mobile phone retailer based in the United Kingdom, sold to O2 in June 2006.
- Freetalk, a VoIP business, whose customers were transferred to Vonage, a VoIP company based in the United States, in August 2006.
- Pixmania, a French-based online retailer, which was acquired by Dixons Retail in April 2006, and sold in September 2013.
- @Jakarta, a computer games store, which was sold to Gameplay.com in August 2000.

== Financial results ==
The following table shows the company's financial results:

DSG International plc financial results
Fiscal year	2013	2012	2011	2010	2009	2008	2007	2006	2005	2004	2003	2002	2001	2000	1999	1998
Fiscal year end date	30/04/13	28/04/12	01/05/11	01/05/10	02/05/09	03/05/08	28/04/07	29/04/06	30/04/05	01/05/04	03/05/03	27/04/02	28/04/01	29/04/00	01/05/99	02/05/98
Turnover (£ millions)	8,213.9	8,186.7	8,154.4	8,531.6	8,227.0	8,545.9	7,929.7	7,072.0	6,982	6,491	5,750.5	4,888.2	4,688.2	3,889.9	3,156.3	2,791.9
Profit before tax (£ millions)	(115.3)	70.8	(224.1)	112.7	(140.4)	(192.8)	295.1	302.9	336.8	366.2	278.6	282.3	647.1 (Note: The above trend profits for 2000 and 2001 were primarily attributable to profits on disposal of Freeserve shares.)	472.1	231.3	213.3
Profit for the period (£ millions)	(168.1)	(194.4)	(245.3)	57.3	(219.3)	(259.7)	2.4	211.7	243.1	289.4	207.8	211.2	602.6	413.7	186.2	166.4
Basic earnings per share (pence)	(4.4)	(4.3)	(6.6)	1.7	(10.2)	(14.5)	10.9	11.7	12.6	14.4	10.7	11.0	31.5	22.5	41.1 (Note: Pre stock split)	36.9

== See also ==
- European Retail Round Table
