= Stanley Kalms, Baron Kalms =

British businessman (1931–2025)

The Right Honourable The Lord Kalms
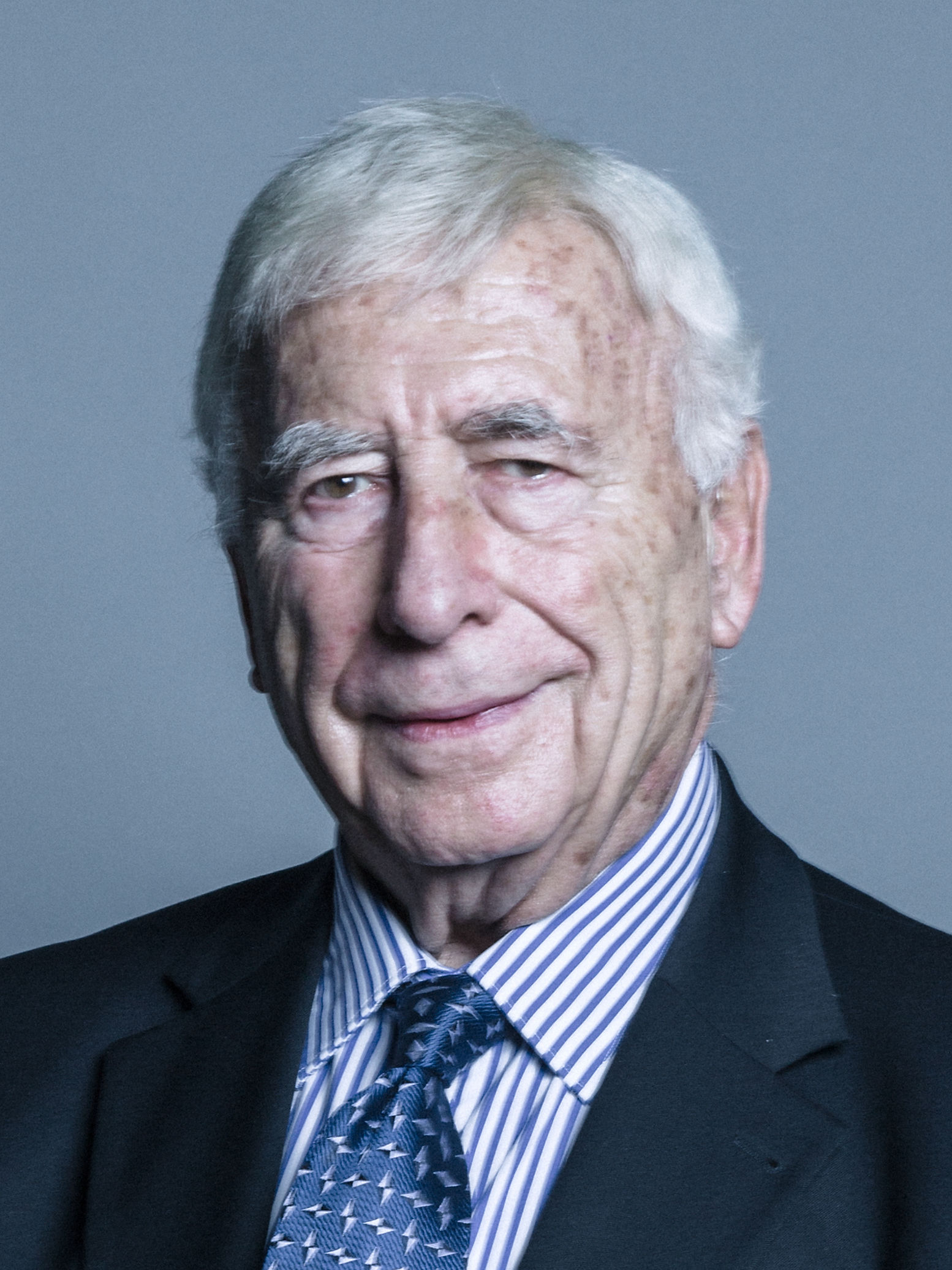
- Official portrait, 2018

Member of the House of Lords
- Lord Temporal
- Life peerage 1 June 2004 – 9 July 2024

Chairman of Dixons Group
- In office 1971–2014
- Preceded by: Charles Kalms
- Succeeded by: Currys Group

President of Currys plc
- In office 2014–2024
- Preceded by: Dixons Group plc
- Succeeded by: Currys Group plc

Personal details
- Born: Harold Stanley Kalms; 21 November 1931
- Died: 30 March 2025 (aged 93)
- Party: Non-affiliated (2009–2024)
- Other political affiliations: Conservative Party (until 2009)
- Spouse: Pamela Jimack (m. 1954)
- Children: 3
- Parent(s): Charles Kalms (father); Sarah "Cissie" Shlagman (mother)
- Occupation: Businessman
- Known for: Dixons Retail; Dixons; Dixons Travel; Currys plc; Dixons Group; Currys Digital; Volvere plc; Dixons Academy Trust

Harold Stanley Kalms, Baron Kalms (21 November 1931 – 30 March 2025) was a British businessman who was the life president and chairman of Currys plc. In 1948 he joined Dixons, which was founded by his father Charles Kalms in 1937. He spent his whole career with the company, through its various mergers and acquisitions into Currys.

Kalms was chairman of Volvere plc, a British turnaround group, from 2002 to 2011.

== Background ==
Stanley Kalms was educated at Christ's College, Finchley. He married Pamela Jimack in 1954. They had three sons (Richard, Stephen and Paul) and eight grandchildren. Kalms died on 30 March 2025, at the age of 93.

== Career ==
Kalms joined Dixons in 1948 at the age of 16 and over the years grew the company from a one-store family business into Europe's leading specialist electrical retailer. Kalms was appointed Chairman of the Dixons Group plc in 1971. He was also a Governor of Dixons City Academy in Bradford, West Yorkshire (where an art theatre complex is named in his honour), a Director of Business for Sterling, and a Director of the National Institute of Economic and Social Research.

== Charitable activities ==
Kalms was also involved in many private charitable activities including the setting up of the Stanley Kalms Foundation in London and previously the Stanley Kalms Readership in Business Ethics and Strategic Management at University of North London. He was Chairman of King's Healthcare NHS Trust from 1993 to 1996. He was also involved in the King's Hospital ISLET Diabetes Research Programme.

== Publications ==
Kalms wrote in the press on the subjects of European Monetary Union (EMU), and on Corporate Governance; and a book – A Time to Change – a review of the activities of the United Synagogue (1996).

== Politics ==
Kalms was treasurer of the Conservative Party, 2001–03. Like many in the party, he opposed the Euro. Kalms, who was Jewish, attacked William Hague for his position on the Israeli attack in Lebanon, calling him an "ignorant armchair critic" and that his remarks were "downright dangerous". In 2004, he became a life peer in the House of Lords. He was expelled from the party in 2009 after voting for UKIP in that year's European Parliament elections. and was subsequently non-affiliated. On 10 July 2024 it was announced that Kalms had ceased to be a member of the House of Lords due to non attendance in the previous parliamentary session.

He was the Director of the Centre for Policy Studies (CPS) think tank from 1991 to 2001. He was a member of the Advisory Board of United Against Nuclear Iran which is an advocacy organization closely tied to neoconservative and other “pro-Israel” factions that promotes a confrontational U.S. stance towards Iran, particularly with respect to its nuclear program. Kalms was a member of the Savile Club and Portland Club. The Stanley Kalms Foundation gave £100,000 to the neoconservative Henry Jackson Society in 2013.

== Honours ==
Kalms had close connections to the University of Buckingham. He received an honorary degree from Buckingham, and Chris Woodhead was the Sir Stanley Kalms Professor of Education. He received his knighthood in the 1996 New Years Honours for his services to the electrical retailing industry and made a life peer as Baron Kalms, of Edgware in the London Borough of Barnet in 2004.

Kalms ceased to be a member of the House of Lords on 9 July 2024 under the House of Lords Reform Act 2014 because of non-attendance in the preceding session of Parliament.

== Coat of arms ==
Coat of arms of Stanley Kalms, Baron Kalms
Crest A lynx rampant guardant Gules grasping in the dexter forepaw a lightning flash Or. Escutcheon Barry wavy of six Argent and Gules on a pale Azure a lightning flash Or. Supporters On either side a lynx guardant holding in the exterior forepaw a chain Or. Motto Constantia Et Integritas Vitae
