= Kalms =

Kalms is a surname. Notable people with the surname include:

- Barry Kalms, Australian Paralympic weightlifter and athlete
- Charles Kalms (1898?-1978), British businessman
- Frederick Kalms (1897–1977), Australian tennis player
- Stanley Kalms, Baron Kalms (1931–2025), British businessman, and life peer
