= Bimeks =

BİMEKS BİLGİ İŞLEM VE DIŞ TİCARET A.Ş.
- Type: A.Ş.
- Traded as: BİST: BMEKS
- Industry: Retail
- Founded: 1990
- Defunct: 2019
- Fate: Declared bankrupt by a court on April 24, 2021
- Headquarters: Istanbul, Turkey
- Number of locations: 135 (2016)
- Area served: Turkey
- Key people: Murat Akgiray (Chairman)
- Products: Computers and electronics

Bimeks was a Turkish electronics retailer. It was Turkey's first technology products retail company, which started its commercial activities in 1990 in a small shop in Kadıköy. It went bankrupt in 2019.

== Business and activities ==
Founded in 1990 by brothers Mehmet Murat Akgiray and Ahmet Vedat Akgiray, Bimeks retailed IT products, consumer electronics, and home appliances from 135 stores in 60 cities around Turkey. It went public in April 2011, becoming the first technology retail company to start trading on Borsa Istanbul. Bimeks, whose total turnover was 396 million TL in 2011, made a major acquisition in September 2013 and acquired 100% of the Turkish branch of Electro World, which belonged to Dixons Retail PLC. In November 2013, it merged with Electro World and Electro World transferred all of its stores in Turkey to Bimeks. In 2014, Bimeks acquired the 28 stores of the Darty chain from owners Kesa Turkey.

In December 2016, it had 135 stores in 60 provinces of Turkey.

On March 12, 2019, it was officially delisted from Borsa Istanbul.

It was officially declared bankrupt by a court on April 24, 2021.
