= Dixons (retailer) =

Former online retailer in the United Kingdom and Ireland

- Dixons logo
- Type: Online Retailer
- Industry: Retail
- Founded: 1937
- Defunct: 9 October 2012
- Fate: Closed
- Successor: Currys Digital
- Headquarters: Hemel Hempstead, Hertfordshire; England
- Key people: Per Bjørgås (Managing Director)
- Products: White goods Telecommunications; Information technology
- Owner: Dixon Group
- Parent: Currys plc (intellectual properties)

Dixons was a British high-street retailer of consumer electronics, originally founded in 1937 as a photographic studio by Charles Kalms. The company would later deal in many consumer electronics, with nationwide outlets in the United Kingdom and Ireland.

In 1984, Dixons purchased rival Currys, retaining the separate brand identities for the two stores. Dixons typically encompassed shopping centres and town centres, whereas Currys were larger stores in out-of-town retail parks. On 5 April 2006, it was announced that the Dixons brand in the United Kingdom would be superseded by Currys, branded as Currys.digital. The Ireland subsidiary followed this in August 2008. Dixons continued to trade online as Dixons.co.uk, until 2012.

== History ==
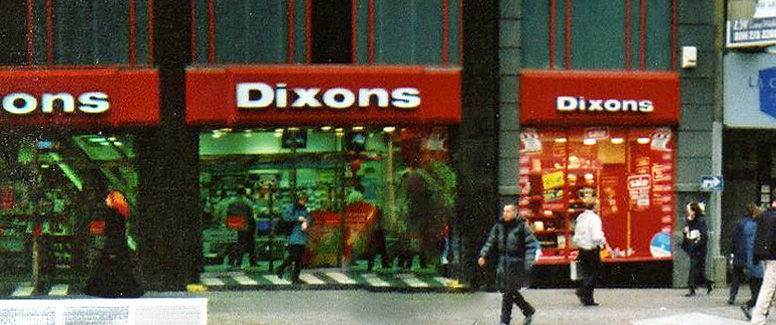
Dixons store in Sheffield in 2000

The first Dixons was opened by Charles Kalms in Southend as a photographic studio in 1937. The business flourished during the Second World War, as there was much demand for photographic services and family portraits.

By the end of the war, Kalms had opened seven more studios in the London area. The demands for portrait services decreased considerably after the war, and he was forced to close all but one studio in Edgware, north London. The company was taken over by his son Stanley Kalms, who was chairman until September 2002.

On 5 April 2006, Dixons announced that there would no longer be any Dixons shops in Britain; shops would henceforth be named Currys.digital. This was said to signal a shift to more Internet based selling and to "reduce confusion". Dixons stores were to be retained in Ireland, and in locations such as airports, and the Dixons website would continue.

The Dixons subsidiary in Ireland was discontinued in August 2008, renamed to Currys. A Dixons.ie internet site was set up. Dixons branches in airports were re branded as Dixons Travel from January 2009, and the new format was rolled out to many airports in the United Kingdom.

=== Closure ===
In October 2012, Dixons Retail announced that they would no longer trade using Dixons.co.uk website. Customers were then redirected to the Currys and PC World websites, where all remaining orders and agreements were honoured.

== Dixons Travel ==
Dixons Travel
- Formerly: Dixons Tax Free
- Type: Division
- Industry: Retail
- Founded: June 13, 1994; 32 years ago
- Fate: Closed (original); Folded into Currys plc (relaunch)
- Headquarters: North Acton, London, United Kingdom
- Key people: Wayne Bannerman (operations director); Charlotte Green (head of finance); Neil Matthews (head of merchandising)
- Products: Electronics & Travel Accessories
- Owner: Currys plc
- Website: DixonsTravel.com at the Wayback Machine (archived 2020-03-11)

Dixons Travel was a technology retailer, with stores in four airports in the United Kingdom and Ireland. It was a division of Currys Retail, a subsidiary of Currys plc.

It was initially established as Dixons Tax Free in June 1994 to relaunch the Dixons brand in airport locations. The name changed to Dixons Travel in January 2009. A branch in Brussels trades under the Knowhow brand.

On 28 April 2021, Dixons Carphone announced the closure of the Dixons Travel business, due to the removal of tax-free shopping in UK airports from December 2020, and lower passenger numbers during the COVID-19 pandemic. The company stated that the Dixons Travel business had historically contributed annual profits of over £20 million to the Dixons Carphone group.

In June 2021, Dixons Travel had reopened its stores in Birmingham Airport, Dublin Airport's Terminal 1, Gatwick Airport's North Terminal, and Heathrow Airport's Terminals 2 and 5. Other stores in Heathrow's Terminals 3 and 4 and the rest of the UK, Dublin's Terminal 2 reopened July 19, 2021. Oslo Airport, and stores on both the P&O Ventura and Britannia cruise ships, closed due to folding into Currys plc.
