= Electro World =

Electro World may refer to:

- Electro World (retailer), a European electronics retailer operating in several countries
- Electro World (song), a 2006 single by the band Perfume
- Electro World (franchise), a Dutch electronics franchise with more than 150 stores
