= ID Mobile =

British mobile virtual network operator

iD Mobile Limited
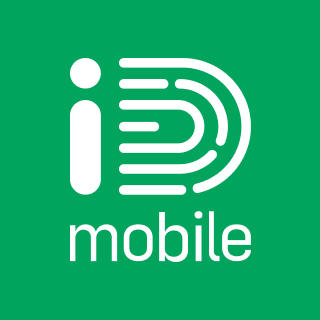
- Type: Subsidiary
- Industry: Telecommunications
- Founded: 12 May 2015; 11 years ago
- Headquarters: London
- Areas served: United Kingdom; Ireland (until 2018)
- Products: Mobile telecommunications services
- Parent: Currys plc
- Website: www.idmobile.co.uk

iD Mobile Limited is a British mobile virtual network operator (MVNO), using the Three network. The company is a wholly owned subsidiary of Currys plc, and its services were launched on 12 May 2015. Until April 2018, service was also provided in Ireland, again using the Three network.

== Products and services ==
iD offers pay-monthly contracts for 24 months with a handset, or 1, 12 and 24 month SIM-only contracts. All services use the 4G or 5G signal from the Three network. These can be bought online via the iD Mobile website, via iD Mobile telephone sales or in a Currys or Carphone Warehouse store.

Features include tethering, rollover of unused data allowance (to the next month only) and roaming (50 destinations).

== Ireland ==
In June 2017, Dixons Carphone announced their intention to withdraw iD Mobile from the market in Ireland. Services ceased in April 2018, and iD Mobile Ireland filed for liquidation.

== Advertising campaigns ==
iD mobile use the tag line 'Mobile done right', focusing on providing value packages with simple features.

Previous advertising has included the Fletcher Street Urban Riding Club from North Philadelphia, British comedian Asim Chaudhry, and a year-long partnership with the Kiss Breakfast Radio show.

In 2022, they sponsored Friends on Channel 5 featuring a series of sketches involving friends video calling each other in situations reminiscent of classic scenes from the sitcom. They also sponsored ITV's broadcasts of Family Guy, with a series of sketches involving families texting and video calling each other to make jokes.

== Financials and statistics ==
iD Mobile is part of Currys plc. In 2023, iD Mobile announced they had reached 1.5 million subscriptions. In 2024, they surpassed 2 million subscriptions.

For the year ending 30 April 2022, iD reported turnover of £100 million and profit before tax of £23.9 million.
