= Currys Digital =

Former British electrical retailer

- Type: Division
- Industry: Retail
- Predecessor: Dixons
- Founded: April 2006; 20 years ago
- Fate: Converted to Currys PC World
- Successor: Currys PC World
- Headquarters: Hemel Hempstead, United Kingdom
- Products: White goods; Telecommunications; Information technology
- Owner: Currys Group
- Parent: Dixons Carphone

Currys Digital (stylised as Currys.digital) was an electrical retailer in the United Kingdom owned by Dixons Carphone, with its origins in a photographic shop opened by Charles Kalms.

The chain was known as Dixons until 2006, when parent company DSG International announced they were moving away from the Dixons brand, except in Ireland and airports in the United Kingdom.

== History ==
=== Origins ===
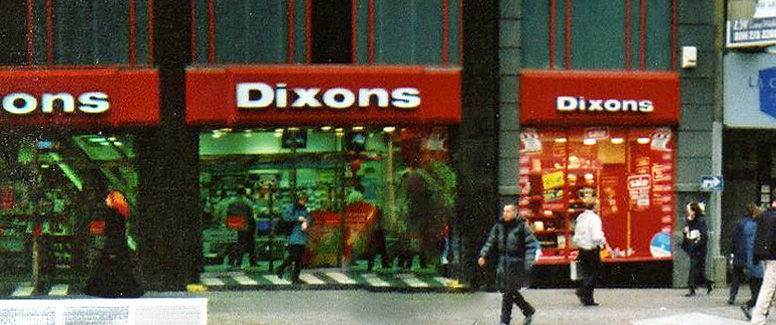
Dixons store in Sheffield in 2000

The first Dixons store was opened by Charles Kalms in Southend as a photographic studio in 1937. The business flourished during the Second World War, as there was much demand for photographic services and family portraits. By the end of the war Kalms had opened seven more studios in the London area.

Unfortunately for Kalms, the demands for portrait services decreased considerably after the war, and he was forced to close all but one studio in Edgware, North London. There are now more than thirty stores across the United Kingdom, and more than 7,000 staff working for DSGI.

=== Business practices while trading as Dixons ===
The retailer had long suffered the reputation that its staff were unhelpful.

In November 1998, Dixons came under fire because of the prices it was charging for personal computers. Peter Mandelson said he was worried that consumers were getting a 'raw deal' because of the store's dominant position in the market. Intel's chief executive at that time, Craig Barrett, said that Dixons charges "ridiculous margins". The Intel Architecture Business Group said "Dixons has classic channel presence and can determine what gets sold at what price."

Dixons responded that it could not make sense of the comments. The Consumers' Association said "Dixons controls over half of the high street distribution of PCs and they seem to be using this enormous market power to keep prices to consumers high" and has a "monopoly position in the high street". Criticism continued into April 2000, when competitor John Lewis, with the support of two members of parliament, accused Dixons of stifling competition in the market by striking anti competitive deals with suppliers.

The retail chain was criticised by the Consumers' Association in February 2003, for the way staff pressured customers (through "dodgy sales tactics" and "dubious practices") into purchasing poor value extended warranties, an issue which was widely reported in the press, with Dixons facing particular criticism by virtue of supplying one in four of all extended warranties accounting for 40% of the store's profits.

=== 2006 Dixons rebranding to Currys.digital ===
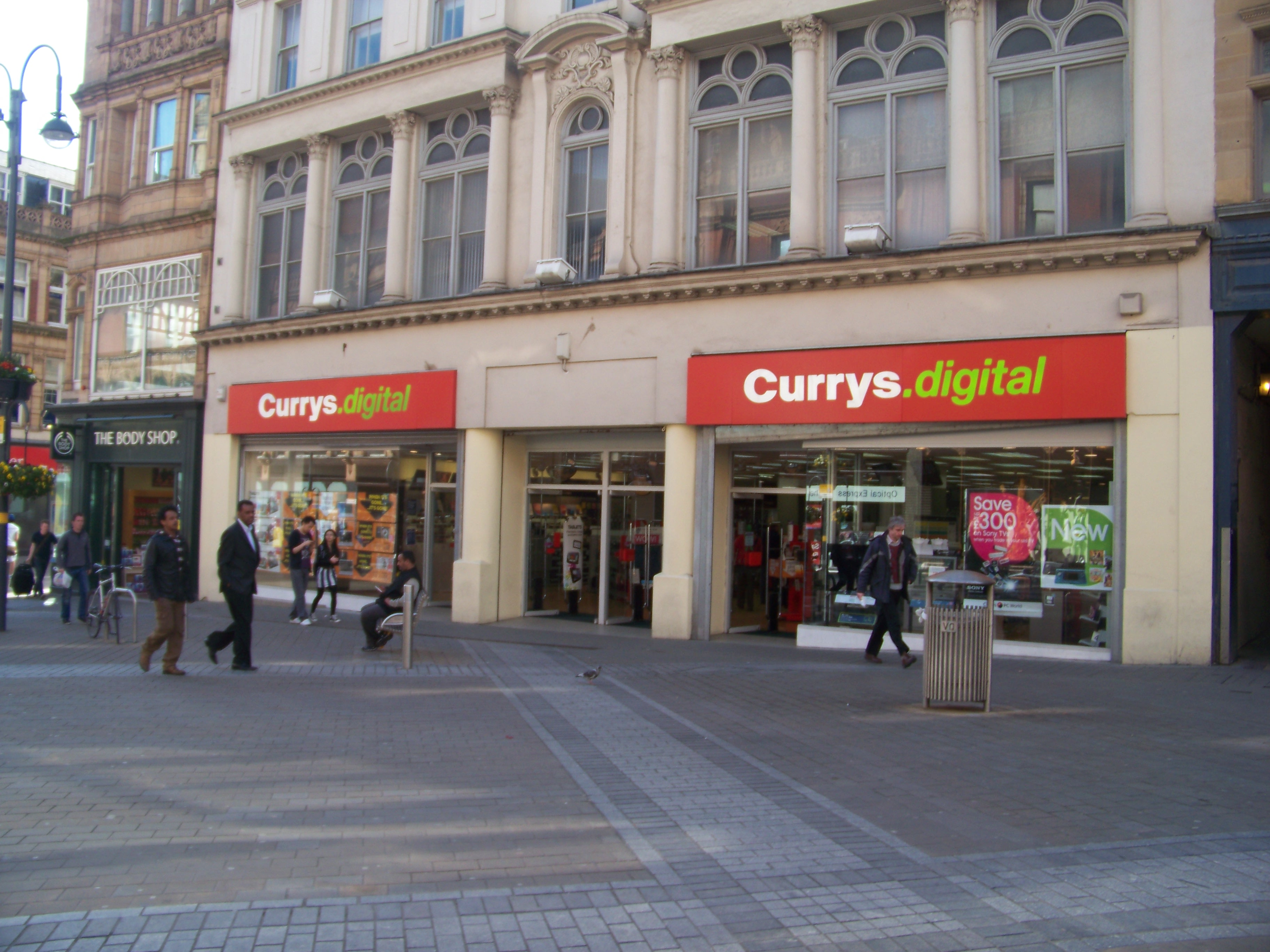
A larger Currys.digital branch on Briggate, Leeds

On 5 April 2006, Dixons announced that they were removing their brand from the high street and would only be using the Currys brand, Dixons rebranded as Currys.digital an extension of Currys.digital markets itself as a specialist division of Currys aimed at the technology focused consumer with product ranges such as cameras, personal computers, audio and video equipment, as Dixons had in the past, while offering a small range of large and small domestic appliances that the traditional Currys stores sell. However, there are a small number of Currys.digital stores which still devote a lot of the store to appliances such as white goods.

An example of this would be the Currys.digital in Bull Ring, Birmingham or on Northumberland Street in Newcastle upon Tyne. This is because that branch was a Dixons XL store. The store in Kingston upon Hull used to also display appliances, however underwent a revamp to bring it into line with the Currys.digital brand. Dixons stores would still be retained in Ireland, and other locations such as airports, while also retaining its website.

The Dixons stores in The Netherlands had been sold off years before the rebrand, but still carry the Dixons brand. Before the Dixons rebranding, the Currys chain contained only a few small town centre high-street stores compared with its much greater number of large out of town superstores.

In 2009, Currys.digital was renamed as Currys Digital, and, along with the main store, got the new Currys logo. As of 2010 Currys Digital stores will be refurbished as joint Currys PC World stores, the first of these opened in the Summer of 2010. As of 2020 there are no Currys Digital stores remaining.

=== Fraud issues ===
In 2019, the company became the target of online fraud, as fraudsters managed to hijack the retailer's eBay account and steal thousands of pounds from customers of Currys PC World. The scammers were able to steal from customers by setting up a fake PayPal account and used an email address that looked identical to Currys PC World's real account. PayPal, eBay and Currys PC World took the responsibility of refunding everyone affected.
