= Public Power Corporation =

Greek electricity company

- Native name: Δημόσια Επιχείρηση Ηλεκτρισμού A.E.
- Type: Public
- Traded as: Athex: PPC
- Industry: Energy
- Founded: 1950
- Headquarters: Athens, Greece
- Key people: Georgios Stassis (Chairman & CEO)
- Products: Electric power, natural gas
- Services: Electrical power distribution, natural gas provider, FTTH
- Revenue: ▲€5.706 billion (2021)
- Operating income: ▲€821 million (2021)
- Net income: ▼€18.4 million (2021)
- Total assets: ▲€17.779 billion (2021)
- Total equity: ▲€5.079 billion (2021)
- Owner: HRADF (35.30%); CVC Capital Partners (10.34%)
- Number of employees: ▼12,909 (2021)
- Website: www.dei.gr
- Footnotes financial figures are in group, but excluding IPTO

PPC logo used in Greece

The Public Power Corporation S.A. (PPC; Greek: Δημόσια Επιχείρηση Ηλεκτρισμού A.E., romanized: Dimosia Epicheirisi Ilektrismou A.E., ΔΕΗ or DEI) is the largest electric power company in Greece. PPC acquired Enel Romania from the Italian Enel group for €1.24 billion on October 25, 2023.

== History ==
PPC was founded by the Greek government in 1950. Its main purpose was to plan and apply a national energy policy which, through the exploitation of the domestic products and resources, would distribute cheap electric power to all Greek citizens. PPC started the integration of all the small local grids to the national interconnected grid. Furthermore, the corporation resolved the purchase of all the small private and local electric power production units.

Today, PPC Group consists of 5 subsidiary companies in Greece PPC S.A., the Hellenic Electricity Distribution Network Operator (HEDNO or DEDDIE) S.A., PPC RENEWABLES S.A., PPC Fibegrip and Kotsovolos. Also PPC Group consists of 3 subsidiary companies in Romania PPC Romania, Retele Electrice and PPC Renewables Romania. Even if HEDNO S.A. (the Greek DSO) is owned by PPC, HEDNO S.A. operates independently according to L.4001/2011 and in compliance with 2009/72/EC EU Directive relative to the electricity market organization.

== Shareholders ==
In 2001, PPC carried out a share flotation on the Athens Stock Exchange and consequently was no longer wholly owned by the government, although it was still controlled by it with a 51.1% stake until 2021.

In June 2011, the Greek government announced it would sell 17% of its share of PPC to meet conditions of EU/ECB/IMF loan package. The workers of PPC responded by limited power cuts to selected towns across Greece. However, the Tsipras Government decided to suspend the privatisation of PPC as one of its first anti-austerity measures.

On 16 November 2021, the company completed a share capital increase that the Greek government as a shareholder chose not participate in. As a result, the Greek government's shareholding decreased from 51.12% to 34.12%, which is currently held by the country sovereign wealth fund, the Hellenic Corporation of Assets and Participations (HCAP). On 3 March 2022, CVC Capital Partners acquired 10% of the company's shareholding.

The company’s shares are traded in the «Large Cap» category of the Athens Stock Exchange (ATHEX), while in the London Stock Exchange they are traded in the form of global depository receipts (GDRs).

The company’s shareholding structure as of 30 June 2025 was as follows:

Shareholders	Percentage
Hellenic Republic Asset Development Fund	35.30%
CVC Capital Partners	10.34%
Treasury Shares	5.10%
Other Shareholders	49.26%
Total	100.00%

== Renewable energy ==
In 1982, PPC developed the first wind farm in the world, combined with a photo-voltaic station to supply electricity to the isolated power system of the island of Kythnos.

The PPC has committed to buying renewable-source energy from independent producers at five times its selling rate until 2034.

Legislation before Parliament in 2013-14 included making the PPC responsible for collection of the real estate tax, part of the EU/IMF/ECB requirements for the financial support of the economy.

PPC acquired 600 MW of renewable energy in Romania from Enel Green Power.

Public Power Corp. acquired a wind farm in Romania from Lukoil Group in 2023, in addition to the agreed takeover of the Enel portfolio. Lukoil's asset-a special purpose vehicle called Land Power owns an 84MW system located in the province of Dobruja (Dobrogea), while a 470ha wind farm in the communes of Dorobanțu and Topolog generates more than 200GWh per year.

PPC Renewables, a subsidiary of Public Power Corporation as of March 2024 operates a fleet of renewable power plants with a capacity of more than 700 MW, with a portfolio of 1 GW of projects under construction, and plans to expand its renewable energy and energy storage portfolio to a total capacity of 5 GW by 2029. The company under the project has acquired three Intrakat entities cumulatively owning wind power projects in operation, under construction or prepared for construction with a total capacity of 164 MW. And PPC Renewables is also participating in four other Intrakat entities engaged in wind and solar PV projects with a combined capacity of about 1.6 GW. The deal will possibly include battery energy storage projects as well. The deal is worth 100 million euros and the potential joint investment is estimated at more than 1 billion euros.

== Power plants ==
The 34 major thermal and hydroelectric power plants and the 3 wind farms of the interconnected power grid of the mainland, as well as the 60 autonomous power plants located on Crete, Rhodes and other Greek islands (33 thermal, 2 hydroelectric, 18 wind energy and 5 photovoltaic parks) form PPC's industrial assets and constitute the energy basis of all financial activities of the country.

The total installed capacity of the 97 PPC's power plants is currently 12,760 MW with a net generation of 53.9 TWh in 2007.

== Carbon intensity ==
year	Production (TWh)	Emission (Gt CO_{2})	kg CO_{2}/MWh
2002	49	51.35	1050
2003	52	52.41	1004
2004	53	53.29	1015
2005	53	52.59	994
2006	52	50.48	969
2007	54	53.04	984
2008	52	52.2	996
2009	50	49.7	992

== Mining areas ==
PPC has mining areas adjacent to many of its power plants. Some of these power plants produce electricity and power from lignite, while other plants use coal. The largest mining areas are located around Ptolemaida, around Amyntaio in the Florina prefecture and around Megalopolis. PPC plans a pumped-storage hydroelectric 320 MW / 2.56 GWh project at the Kardia mine, and a 240 MW / 2.88 GWh project at the South Field mine.

== Romania ==
The operations in Romania acquired on 25 October 2023 from Enel include energy distribution to 3.1 million customers, three energy distribution networks in South Muntenia (including Bucharest), Banat and Dobrogea, renewable energy with around 600 MW of capacity and natural gas sales.

== Kotsovolos ==
In early November 2023, PPC (Public Power Corporation) announced the acquisition of Kotsovolos, a Greek consumer electronics retail chain, for €200 million, as part of its plan to evolve into a provider of products and services.

== Legal issues ==
In 2005, PPC was found to have awarded a contract for the construction of a conveyor-belt system for waste produced at its generating plant in Megalopolis without following correct advertising procedures under EU public procurement law. The need for the system had arisen following an environmental impact assessment, after which the Greek Ministry of the Environment, Urban Planning and Public Works had imposed a deadline of December 2000 for the installation of the system. PPC had therefore decided to negotiate a deal for the construction instead of advertising the opportunity; the court held that these circumstances did not quality as "extreme urgency" for the purposes of the procurement regulations.

== See also ==
- Energy in Greece
