= Sebastian James =

British businessman (born 1966)

The Honourable Sebastian James
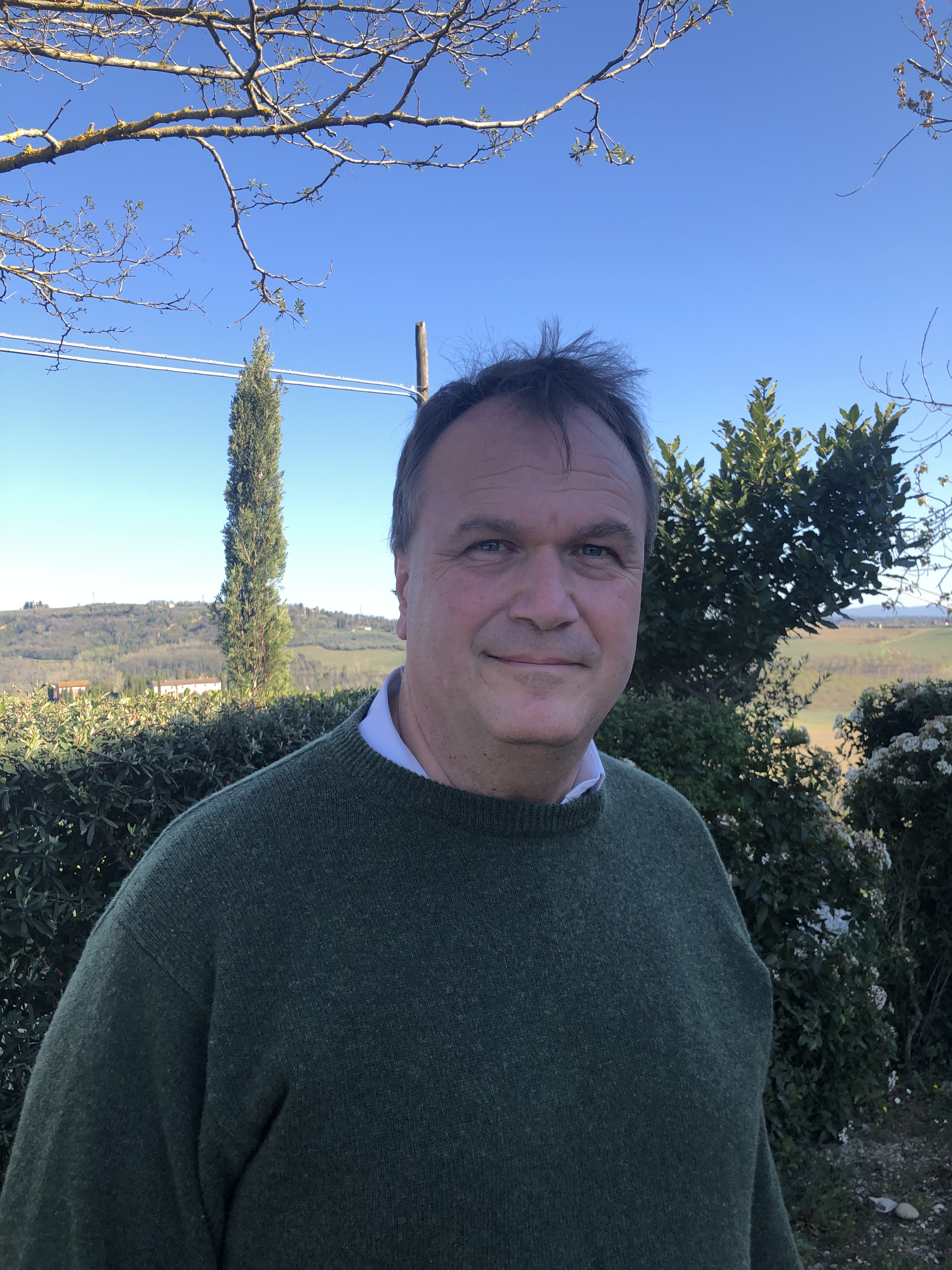
- James in 2018
- Born: Sebastian Richard Edward Cuthbert James; 11 March 1966 (age 60); Great Ormond Street Hospital, London, England
- Other name: Seb James
- Education: Eton College
- Alma mater: Magdalen College, Oxford; INSEAD
- Occupation: Businessman
- Title: CEO, Veonet
- Term: November 2024-
- Spouse: Anna Gregory
- Children: 4
- Parent: Lord Northbourne

Sebastian Richard Edward Cuthbert James (born 11 March 1966) is a British businessman, who has been the CEO of Veonet since November 2024. He was previously CEO of Boots UK, and before that CEO of Dixons Carphone.

== Early life ==
The son of Christopher James, 5th Baron Northbourne, he was educated at Eton College and Magdalen College, Oxford, where he was a member of the Bullingdon Club. He is a family friend of David Cameron. The two were on holiday together in Italy in August 2011 when Cameron had to return to deal with the London riots. James was given a job in government on 5 July 2010, by Education Secretary Michael Gove, reviewing state school spending. He earned an MBA from INSEAD in 1991.

== Career ==
James started his career at Bain & Co, including being project leader with focus on retail and investment banking systems and transaction management. He was the chief executive of Synergy Insurance Services Limited, and strategy director responsible for developing and implementing the turnaround strategy at Mothercare.

He joined Dixons Retail in 2008 as development director managing its Currys transformation programme, becoming group CEO in 2012.

James was appointed CEO of Dixons Carphone in August 2014 following the merger of Dixons Retail with Carphone Warehouse. He was recognised as the mobile industry person of the year for his achievements with the merger.

In January 2018, James resigned as CEO of Dixons Carphone, to run Boots UK, "in a surprise move days before it updates the City on its Christmas trading performance", and was succeeded by Alex Baldock, who had been CEO of the online retailer Shop Direct since 2012.

James is a non-executive director of Direct Line Insurance Group plc, and a trustee of English Heritage. He was previously Chair of the Remuneration Committee and a trustee for Save the Children. He has also served as a trustee for Modern Art Oxford and Techknowledge for Schools.

From 2018 to 2024, James was a senior vice president of Walgreens Boots Alliance, and president and managing director of Boots UK.

Since November 2024, James has been the CEO of Veonet, a European ophthalmological clinic group.

In the runup to the 2024 UK general election James endorsed the Labour Party citing the focus on economic growth and he welcomed Labour’s plans to “put more money in people’s pockets” to help address the cost of living crisis, which he said Boots customers still complain about daily. James's support for the Labour Party was notable not only because of his role as a leader in the business community, but more so for his connection to high-ranking conservative party figures Boris Johnson and David Cameron. Cameron, James, and Johnson all went to Eton together, and later all three men were members of the Bullingdon Club, with all three being in the infamous black and white group picture in 1987 that later made negative news headlines. James's friendship with Cameron went into adulthood with the two going on holiday together to James's Italian villa in 2011, and Cameron put James on a panel to decide how money was spent on new schools in 2012.

== Personal life ==
James is married, and has four children.

Business positions
Preceded by Elizabeth Fagan	Managing Director of Boots UK; September 2018 -	Succeeded by Incumbent
