= Elizabeth Fagan =

Scottish businesswoman (born 1957)

Elizabeth Fagan CBE (born August 1957) is a Scottish businesswoman, chair of D2N2 Local Enterprise Partnership, and the former managing director of Boots UK.

== Early life and education ==
She was born in August 1957, one of eleven children and grew up in Scotland. She has a degree in biochemistry, studying in Glasgow.

In 2018, Fagan was given an honorary doctorate from Nottingham Trent University.

== Career ==
After university, she taught chemistry from 1980 to 1983 at Scottish secondary schools.

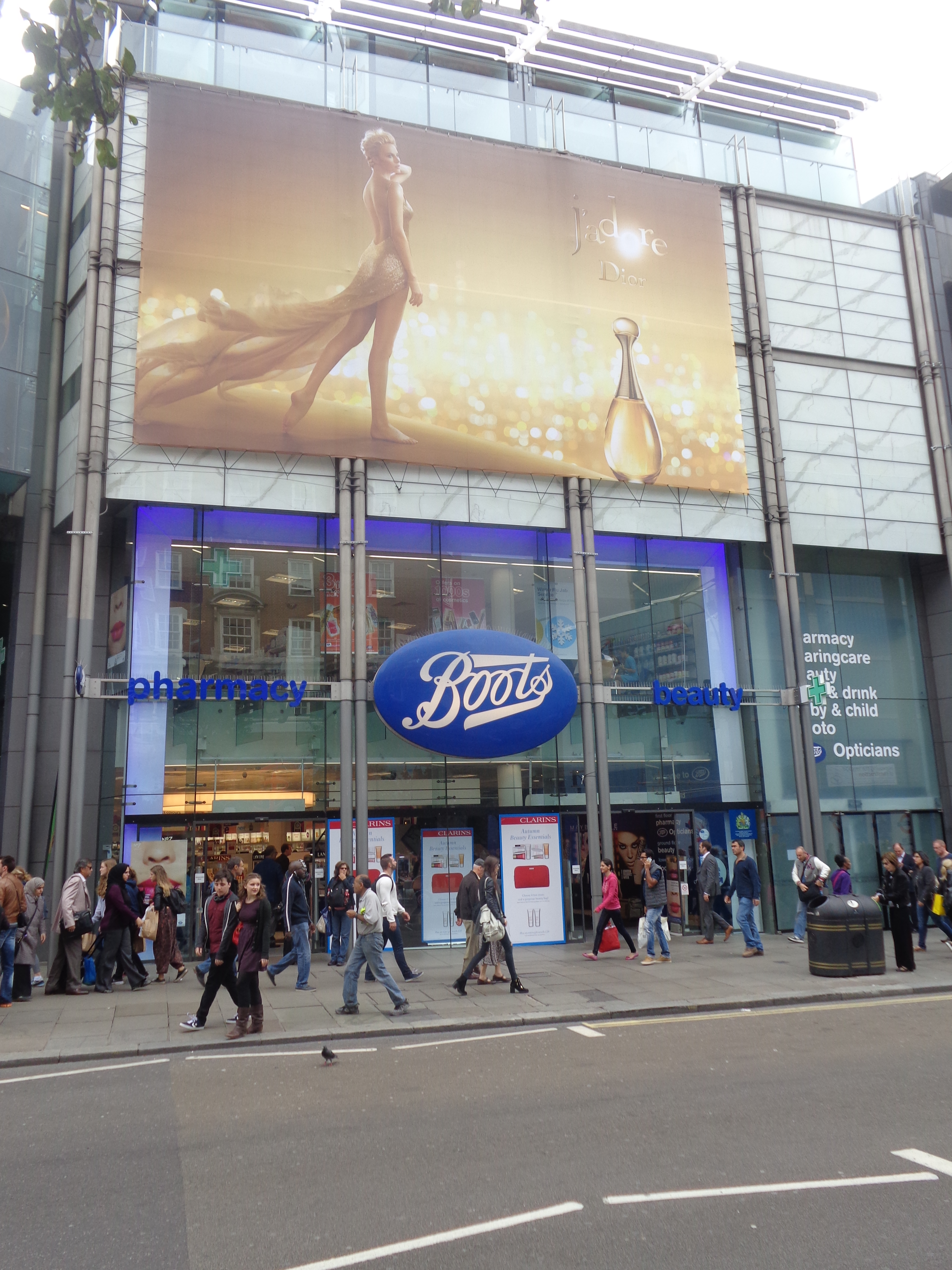
Boots store on Oxford Street in September 2014

=== Boots ===
From 2006 to 2007 she was managing director of Boots Opticians. She comes from the commercial side of the company, not the technical or pharmaceutical side.

It was announced that she would become managing director of Boots UK on 9 June 2016, taking over in July 2016.

She is the first female managing director of Boots UK. Seb James replaced her as managing director at Boots on 1 September 2018.

Fagan was appointed Commander of the Order of the British Empire (CBE) in the 2020 New Year Honours for services to gender equality in business.

=== D2N2 ===
In July 2018 Fagan was appointed chair of D2N2 Local Enterprise Partnership, an organisation tasked with stimulating economic growth across Derbyshire and Nottinghamshire. She revealed a £4m "Angel Fund" in May 2024 that was available to new companies in Nottinghamshire or Derbyshire that are between 6 and 18 months old.

Business positions
Preceded by Simon Roberts	Managing Director of Boots UK; July 2016 - August 2018	Succeeded by Sebastian James
Preceded by	Managing Director of International Retail at Boots UK; January 2015 - June 2016	Succeeded by
Preceded by	Marketing Director of International Health & Beauty at Alliance Boots; October 2013 - January 2015	Succeeded by
Preceded by	Marketing Director of Boots UK & ROI; July 2007 - October 2013	Succeeded by Andy Ferguson
Preceded by	Managing Director of Boots Opticians; September 2006 - July 2007	Succeeded by
Preceded by	Managing Director of The Link; January 2004 - September 2006	Succeeded by
Preceded by	Managing Director of Sketchley Retail; 1993 - 1996	Succeeded by
Preceded by	Managing Director of Supasnaps; 1991 - 1993	Succeeded by
