= Weltron =

Electronics company

- Founded: c. 1968
- Headquarters: Oxford, North Carolina, United States
- Key people: James Pratt Winston (CEO)
- Products: Consumer Electronics
- Owner: Francis Winston (President)
- Website: weltronproducts.com

Weltron is an electronics manufacturer and retailer, based in Oxford, North Carolina. It was previously located in Durham, North Carolina.

In the UK, some of their products were sold under the Prinzsound brand, in Canada under the Fleetwood brand, and in Australia under the GEC brand. Weltron's early product range is known for its Space Age design.

Currently Weltron is owned by Winston International LTD.

== History ==
The Weltron name was first used in 1960 by Womack Electronics, a company run by Charles A. Womack. Womack Electronics filed a trademark application for the brand, which was to produce Cathode ray tubes, in 1962. The trademark was expanded in 1964 to cover the production of Radios, antennas and other devices, in 1965 to cover instruments such as electric organs and electric guitars, and in 1966 to cover electrical cleaning chemicals.

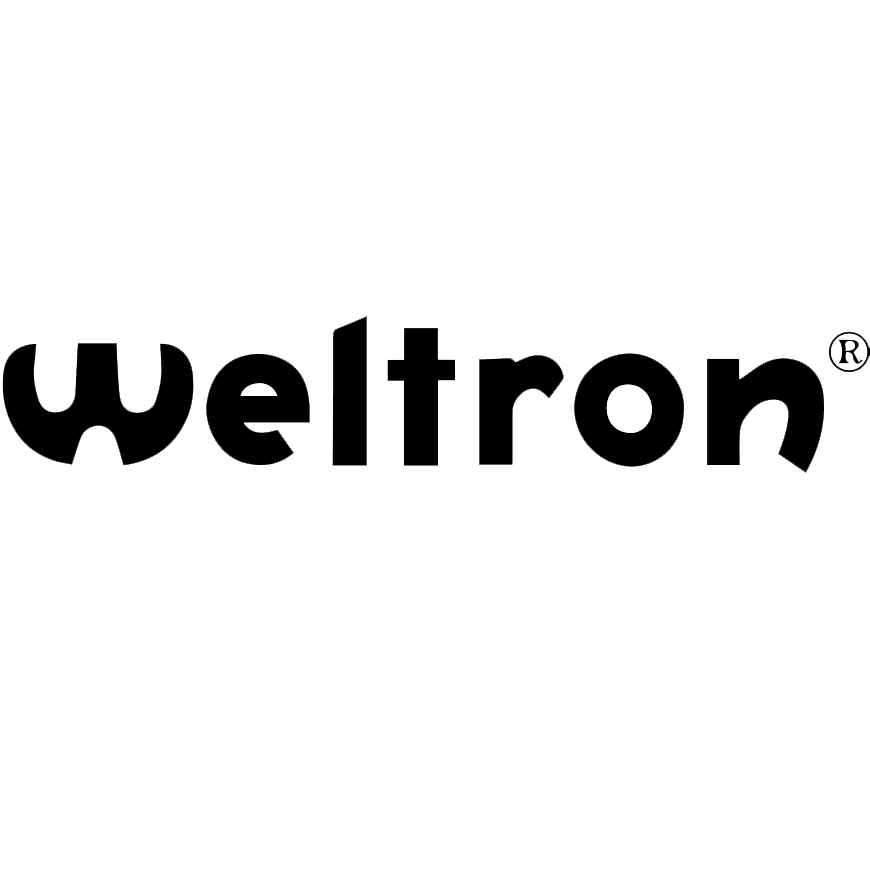
Weltron current logo

James Pratt Winston joined Womack Electronics late in 1968. He left the company and started a new Weltron company, with a 51% share of ownership. Womack owned the remaining 49% share. Weltron's early product range consisted of guitars and other musical instruments, but Winston soon concluded that the company would be better served with its own bespoke product line. He came up with the idea of a spherically shaped stereo FM radio/cassette deck that could run on mains and battery power, known as the Model 2001. Released around 1970–71, the "very unusual" 2001 was priced at $159.95 (equivalent to $1,272 in 2025). The 2001 model was successful, and through 1972 the company developed other models, sold under the "New Shape of Sound" line. These included the 2002, a spherical AM/FM stereo radio, and the 2003, a spherical speaker sold in pairs. The new products were sold by direct marketing, along with advertisements in various consumer magazines. The model 2005 was advertised in May 1973, listed at $300 (equivalent to $2,176 in 2025). Model 2007 was demonstrated at the 1975 Winter Consumer Electronics Show, with a price of $399 (equivalent to $2,387 in 2025). The Model 2010 was listed in 1977 as costing $185 (equivalent to $983 in 2025).

In 1974 the company was bought by LCA Corp for $1,500,000 and settlement of some of the company's debts. then owned by Walter Kidde Inc. Winston served as president of Weltron for about four years. In 1980 he started a new company, Winston International. About five years later Winston International purchased the Weltron brand. The company now sells a range of electrical products, including security systems and computer peripherals.

== TV shows ==
In 1970, James Pratt Winston publicly released his Weltron 2001 stereos. Today these stereos are often featured in movies and TV shows such as Austin Powers International Man of Mystery and That '70s Show for its iconic space age style. With both AM/FM radio and an 8-track player, they were the first stereos to combine multiple audio units into one boombox. They hit the market with a boom through their retro, futuristic design and portability, but few would ever expect the country man that was behind the invention.

== Key People- James Pratt Winston ==
James Pratt Winston, also known as "Big Pratt," was born in 1933 he resided in a small township called Grassy Creek on the border of Virginia. There are no stop lights, no schools, and no grocery stores, but Pratt has a rich family history in the region as evident by the many road signs boasting the Winston name. He grew up in a farmhouse off of James Winston Road on a tobacco farm. Although he would go on to pursue a career in electronics, Pratt's childhood home didn't have electricity until he was 18 years old.

Pratt studied Civil Engineering at North Carolina State for a year. The following summer after returning home he was drafted to go to the Korean War and spent two years in the army. A month after he finally returned home again to work in tobacco industry, everything he had in the tobacco industry burned completely down. So there he

was with no tobacco  and he had nothing for the whole year's work. In later years, Pratt found out that with the GI bill he could go back to school. He  then went back to school and attended Danville Community College and took up electronic engineering where he obtained his degree. Cecil McDowell, Pratt's  professor, introduced him to a man named Charlie Womack. Charlie had a little radio supply company in town and gave Pratt a job in sales at Womack Radio Electrical.

Pratt married his high school sweetheart, Gwendolyn Blackwell, when he was 20 years old. After getting a job in sales at Womack Radio Electrical Supply, he and Gwendolyn moved to Danville, Virginia and started a family. As time went on, Pratt impressed Charlie Womack so much that he was promoted to Executive Vice President of the company.

James Pratt Winston (2019)

He worked at Womack for several years, worked for Charlie Womack but then decided he wanted to start his own business. They then opened Weltron with Pratt as 51% owner and the entire Womack company as 49% owner. The first product they sold would be guitars. After selling over 140,000 Weltron guitars, Pratt and Charlie Womack decided to get out of the guitar business and sell only electronics.

At home Pratt started working on making his own radio., his first one being in a rabbit box. After making his rabbit box radio, Pratt showed it to a friend and together they made the first round Weltron stereo that had both an 8 track tape player and AM/FM radio. The stereo could run on electric current or batteries for portability.

After the success of Pratt's first stereo, Weltron 2001, he began designing new models throughout the early 1970s in a product line dubbed as "The New Shape of Sound." The Weltron 2005 and 2007 models are very indicative of his original inspiration from the spacecraft on "War of the Worlds." These models were meant to provide a full home entertainment system.

In 1980, two years after moving back to North Carolina, Pratt opened Winston International Ltd, an electronic supply distribution company in the nearby town of Oxford. Five years after opening, he purchased back the Weltron brand and continues to sell Weltron products to this day. Weltron is now owned and operated by Pratt's son Francis Winston. Pratt died on July 10, 2024, at the age of 90.

== Design ==
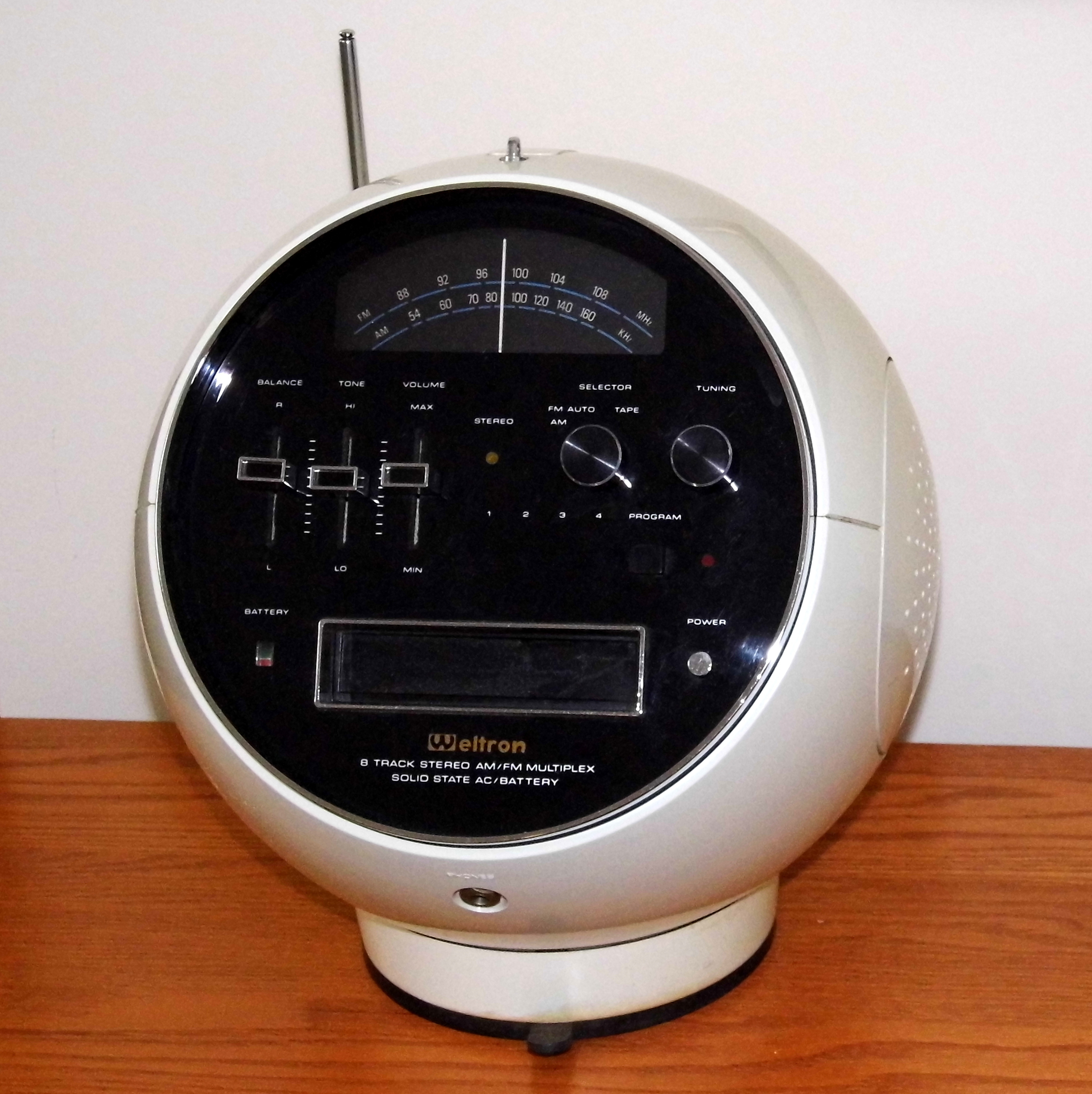
Weltron 8-Track Tape Stereo AM-FM Multiplex Solid State Radio, Model 2001

The Model 2001 was featured in the Henry Ford Museum of American Innovation's "Your Place in Time" exhibition.

== Legacy products ==
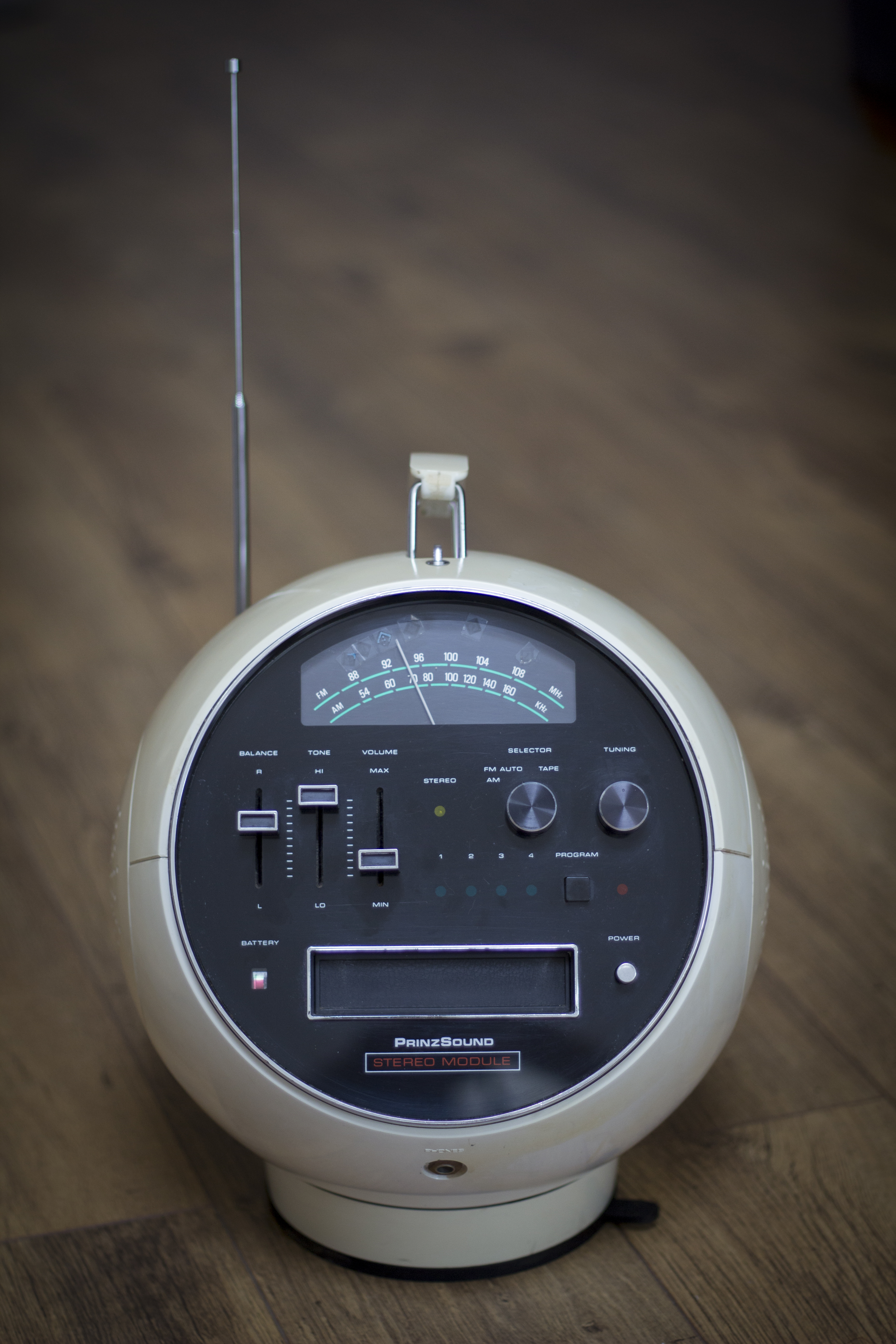
A Prinzsound SM8, otherwise known as a Weltron 2001 "spaceball" AM/FM radio with 8-track player.

=== Home hifi ===
- A-3000 Tuner + A-3100 amplifier - Vertical standing hi-fi components.
- PS-804 – a portable AM/FM audio receiver with 8-track player
- X100KC – a portable AM radio with turntable
- 2001 – a portable AM/FM audio receiver with 8-track player (c. 1970). Commonly known as the "Spaceball".
- 2002 – a portable AM/FM audio receiver (c. 1972)
- 2003 – a pair of spherical speakers (c. 1972)
- 2004 – a portable AM/FM audio receiver with compact cassette recorder
- 2005 – a vinyl turntable with integrated AM/FM audio receiver and 8-track player
- 2006 – a pair of 8 ohm 10 watt tower speakers
- 2007 – a vinyl turntable with integrated AM/FM audio receiver and compact cassette recorder (c. 1975)
- 2010 – a portable AM/FM audio receiver with 8-track player/recorder (c. 1977)
- XX-10 – a portable AM/FM audio receiver with compact cassette recorder
- 37-009 – AM radio headphones
- 37-001w – headphones
- 37-002 – headphones
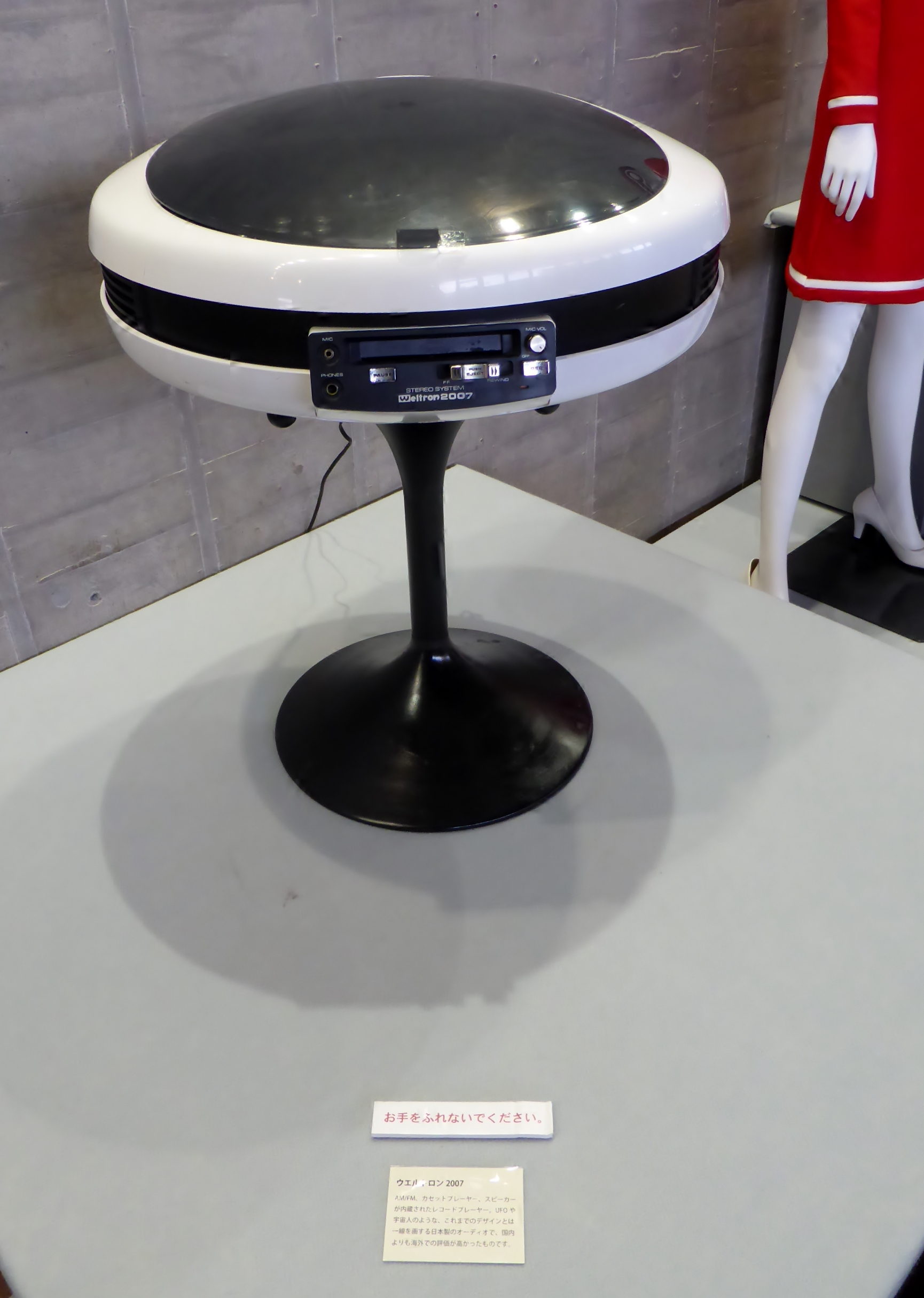
- Model 2007 was demonstrated at the 1975 Winter Consumer Electronics Show, with a price of $399 (equivalent to $1,896 in 2019).
  37-004 – dynamic headphones
- 3006 – a pair of speakers
- S-45 – stand for 2005 and 2007 models

=== Car audio ===
- WAP-805 – an in-car 8-track player
- 717-K – an in-car 8-track player

=== Home electronics ===
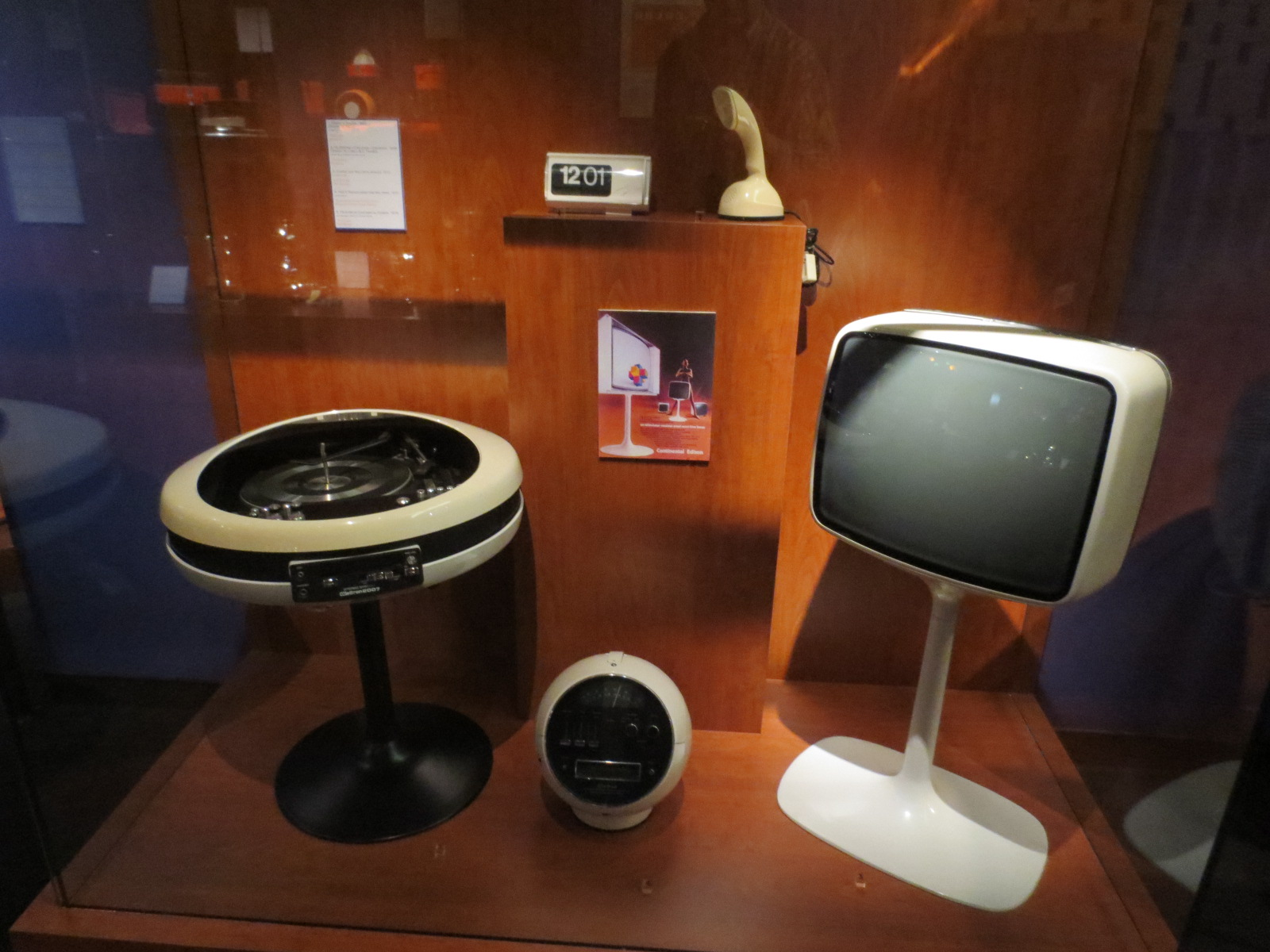
- Weltron (record changer, left and an 8-track player, bottom), Continental Edison (TV, right). The whole 'space age' design theme was a recurring fad that never caught up with mass buyers. Very few brands and manufactures (e.g. Braun and Brionvega) managed to capitalize on design aesthetics.
  37-104 – electret microphone
- 37-113 – dynamic microphone
- 37-124 – dynamic microphone
- 2500 – clock radio
- 2501 – clock radio
- 2502 – clock radio
- 310 – electronic calculator
