= Hellenic Electricity Distribution Network Operator =

- Native name: Διαχειριστής του Ελληνικού Δικτύου Διανομής Ηλεκτρικής Ενέργειας
- Company type: Public
- Industry: Energy
- Predecessor: PPC General Directorate of Distribution
- Founded: August 22, 2011
- Services: Electrical power distribution
- Operating income: ▲1,093,801,000 (2022)
- Net income: ▼8,246,000 (2021)
- Owner: PPC
- Number of employees: 5,820 (2022)
- Parent: PPC
- Website: deddie.gr

The Hellenic Electricity Distribution Network Operator (Greek: Διαχειριστής Ελληνικού Δικτύου Διανομής Ηλεκτρικής Ενέργειας, or ΔΕΔΔΗΕ was formed by the separation of the Distribution Department of Greece's Public Power Corporation in order to comply with the 2009/72/EC EU Directive relative to the electricity market organization. The mission of this company is to undertake the tasks of the Distribution Network Operator of Greece.

It is a 100% subsidiary of PPC, however, it is independent in operation and management, retaining all the independence requirements that are incorporated within the above mentioned legislative framework.

The electricity distribution network of Greece consists of:

- 113,358 km of Medium Voltage Network (data of year 2020)
- 128,211 km of Low Voltage Network (data of year 2020)

== See also ==
- Energy in Greece
