= Electro World (retailer) =

- Industry: Retail
- Products: Consumer electronics

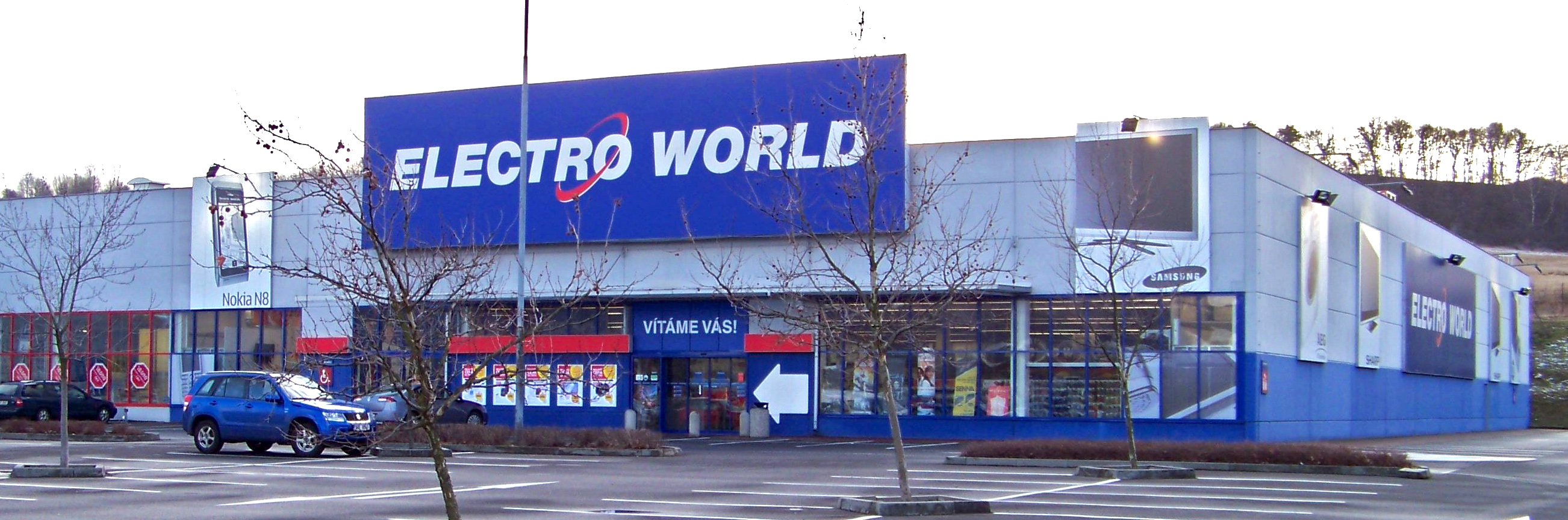
Electro World store in Ústí nad Labem, Czech Republic

Electro World is an electronics online retailer founded in 2002 and operating in Sweden. It also operated in Czech Republic, Hungary, Slovakia, Poland, Greece and Turkey, as a subsidiary of Currys plc (formerly DSG International, then Dixons Carphone), until operations in those countries were sold off.

Electro World operated stores in some countries, and was online-only in others. It arrived in Sweden as an online brand, replacing the PC City website there. PC City's physical stores in Sweden had already been closed down in 2009.

In 2009, the Polish Electro World operation was sold by DSG International to Mix Electronics.

In 2011 Electro World Hungary, failed to escape bankruptcy protection, the Pest County Court initiated liquidation proceedings against the company.

In September 2013, Dixons Retail announced that they would sell the Electro World operations in Turkey to Bimeks. Electro World in Turkey was subsequently integrated into Bimeks.

The online Electro World operations in Greece have been merged with Dixons Retail's existing business Kotsovolos.

Dixons Retail agreed in May 2014 to sell its Electro World operations in the Czech Republic and Slovakia to NAY.

In 2024, NAY combined with HP Tronic, the operator of Czech electronics retailer Datart. The group then reorganized its retail brands, keeping Datart in the Czech Republic and NAY in Slovakia. As a result, Czech Electro World stores were rebranded as Datart from September 2024, and the Electro World website was redirected to Datart.cz.
