= Wallace Heaton =

Photographic shop in London, England

Wallace Heaton was a photographic retailer based in London and was trading independently from 1917 until 1972 when it was bought by Dixons. The company was originally set up by a Wallace Heaton, a pharmacist who opened his shop in New Bond Street; over time he moved his business from pharmacy to photography and photographic supplies.

== History ==
Wallace Heaton supplied the British Royal family with all their cameras and until it closed, one of the Dixons stores in New Bond Street still retained the Wallace Heaton name and the Royal Warrant.

Wallace Heaton produced various ranges of 'own name' products. Besides the Wallace Heaton brand, it also used the brand names of 'Zodel' and 'Harmony', generally attached to imported products.

Wallace Heaton published a small paperback annual, known to all as the Blue Book, and named after the colour of its cover. This was an in-house catalogue and price list published from 1949 to 1972. The company listed practically all still and cine cameras and their accessories as well as projectors, enlargers, flash-guns, lenses and other accessories.

The company also held a significant film library used by film professionals and researchers from across the world.
