= Trygve Fjetland =

Norwegian businessperson

Trygve Kornelius Fjetland (6 March 1926 – 28 October 2013) was a Norwegian businessperson.

He was born in Jelsa, took his secondary education at Rogaland Country Secondary School and graduated with the siv.øk. degree from the Norwegian School of Economics in 1953. In 1962 he founded the electronics retailer Elektrokjøp, later Elkjøp. He retired as chief executive officer in 1986, but continued in the company board.

He resided at Storo in Oslo. In December 2012 he was awarded the King's Medal of Merit. He was also a founder and honorary member of Maridalen Rotary. He died in October 2013.
