= Veonet =

European ophthalmology company

Veonet is a European company operating 210 ophthalmology clinics, as of November 2022.

Veonet has its headquarters in Munich, Germany, and operates clinics in Germany, the UK, the Netherlands, Switzerland, and Spain. Veonet is owned by the private equity firm PAI Partners and the Ontario Teachers' Pension Plan, after they agreed to buy it from private equity firm Nordic Capital in December 2021.

In November 2024, Sebastian James succeeded Markus Hamm as CEO of Veonet.

Veonet owns the Ober Scharrer Gruppe (OSG) in Germany, SpaMedica in the UK, VISTA in Switzerland, Eyescan in the Netherlands and Miranza in Spain.
