= Kotsovolos =

Greek consumer electronics retailer owned by British Currys plc

Kotsovolos (Κωτσόβολος)
- Type: Subsidiary
- Industry: Retail
- Founded: 1950; 76 years ago
- Headquarters: Athens, Greece
- Number of locations: 96 (including 3 in Cyprus)
- Area served: Greece and Cyprus
- Products: Electronics
- Number of employees: 5,600
- Parent: Public Power Corporation
- Website: www.kotsovolos.gr (Greece); www.kotsovolos.cy (Cyprus)

Kotsovolos (Greek: Κωτσόβολος) is one of the leading electrical and electronics retailers in Greece and Cyprus. It started as a small neighborhood store in downtown Athens in 1950 and today has a network of over 90 stores, in Greece and Cyprus, both corporate and franchise, as well as two online stores, kotsovolos.gr and kotsovolos.cy.

Before Public Power Corporation completed its acquisition in 2024, Kotsovolos was part of Dixons for two decades. In addition to retail, it provides after-sales support, installation, warranty and repair services, together with business-to-business services.

The company's headquarters are located in New Heraklion, Attica.

== History ==
Kotsovolos started in 1950 in a regional, small shop downtown Athens.

In 1993 Kotsovolos was bought out by "Fourlis Trade S.A.".

In 1998 Kotsovolos bought out the "Radio Athinai" chain, expanding its network even further.

Kotsovolos expanded into markets outside Greece and in May 2000 embarked on a strategic cooperation with the British multinational, Dixons Carphone plc.

In 2004 it joined forces with the Dixons Group with new privately owned stores, as well as through a franchise system. It renovated its stores in accordance with the international standards of the Dixons group and introduces a new store concept in the market, featuring total support coverage for appliances.

In 2007 it launched its online store www.kotsovolos.gr.

In 2008 Kotsovolos entered appliance recycling, recycling tons of electrical and electronic devices within a few years.

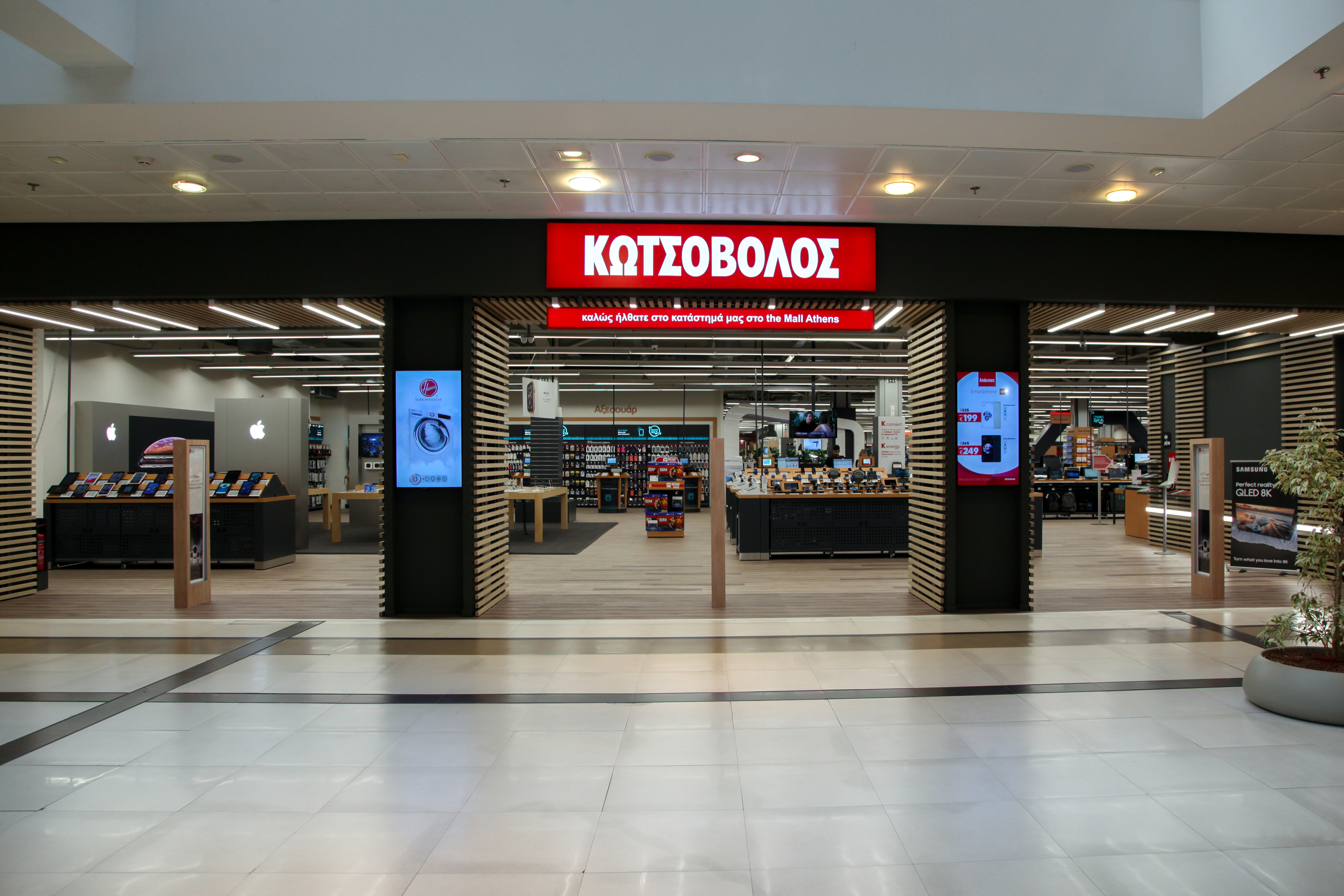
Kotsovolos Store at The Mall Athens

In 2010 Kotsovolos launched the Support 360° integrated customer support umbrella of services, and introduces innovative products to the market, such as 3D TVs and Smart TVs.

In 2015, Kotsovolos celebrated its 65th anniversary with a technology exhibition at the Technopolis of Athens. Exhibits included appliances of the past and state-of-the-art appliances of the future that are not yet released in the Greek market. The Thanks to Tech annual technology exhibition was thus established. Free of charge and easily accessible to all, the exhibition presents technological innovations and devices that are not yet on the market, together with devices that have appeared only at the IFA International Exhibition.

Kotsovolos launched its first online show, "TryMe" on YouTube in 2015.

In 2016 the company presented the corporate social responsibility program "Second Home", which mobilizes those who own appliances that work but are not in use, to offer them to families in need.

In 2019, for the first time in the Greek market, Kotsovolos created the Pay Express service.

In 2021 the company opened up its first online and physical stores in Cyprus.

In 2023, Kostovolos was acquired by the Public Power Corporation for €200 million as part of the PPC's €9 billion investment plan. The transaction was approved and completed in 2024.

== See also ==
- List of companies of Greece
