= Elkjøp =

Norwegian consumer Currys plc

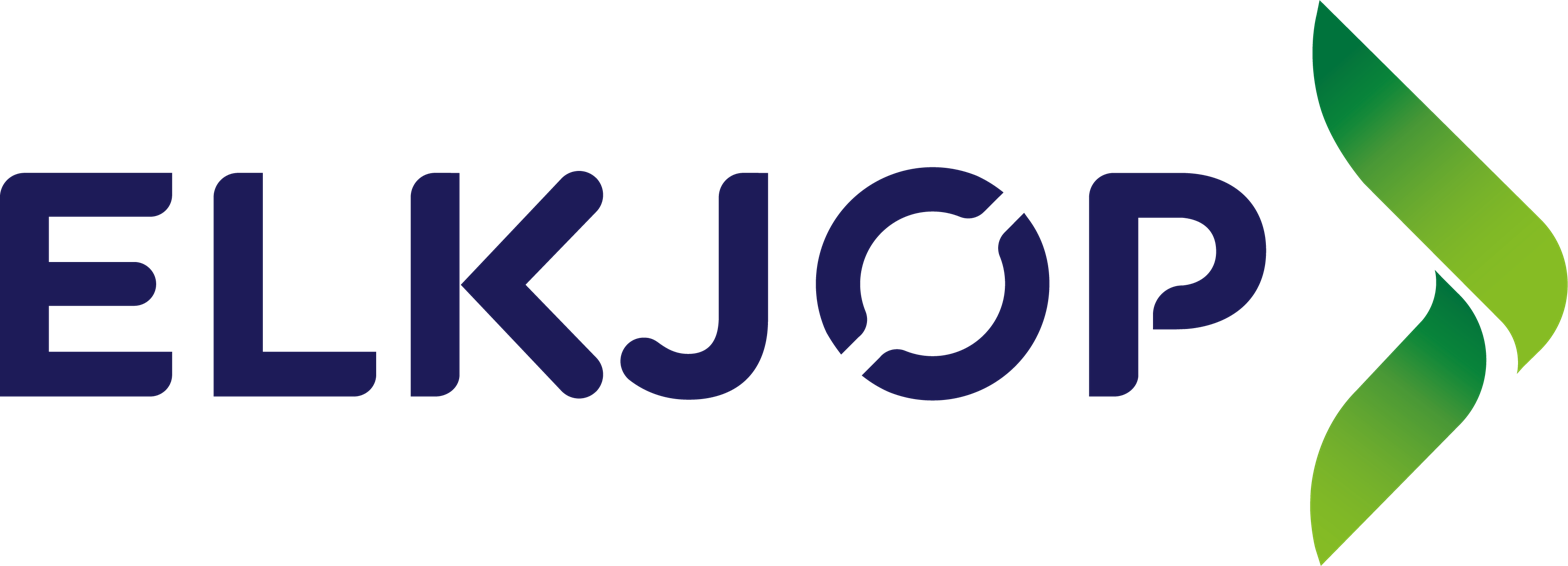
- Industry: Retail
- Founded: March 1962
- Headquarters: Nydalen, Norway
- Key people: Fredrik Tønnesen (CEO: Elkjøp Nordic AS)
- Products: Consumer electronics, white goods, brown goods
- Revenue: 47.15 BNOK (2023–2024)
- Number of employees: 24,000
- Parent: Currys plc
- Website: www.elkjop.no

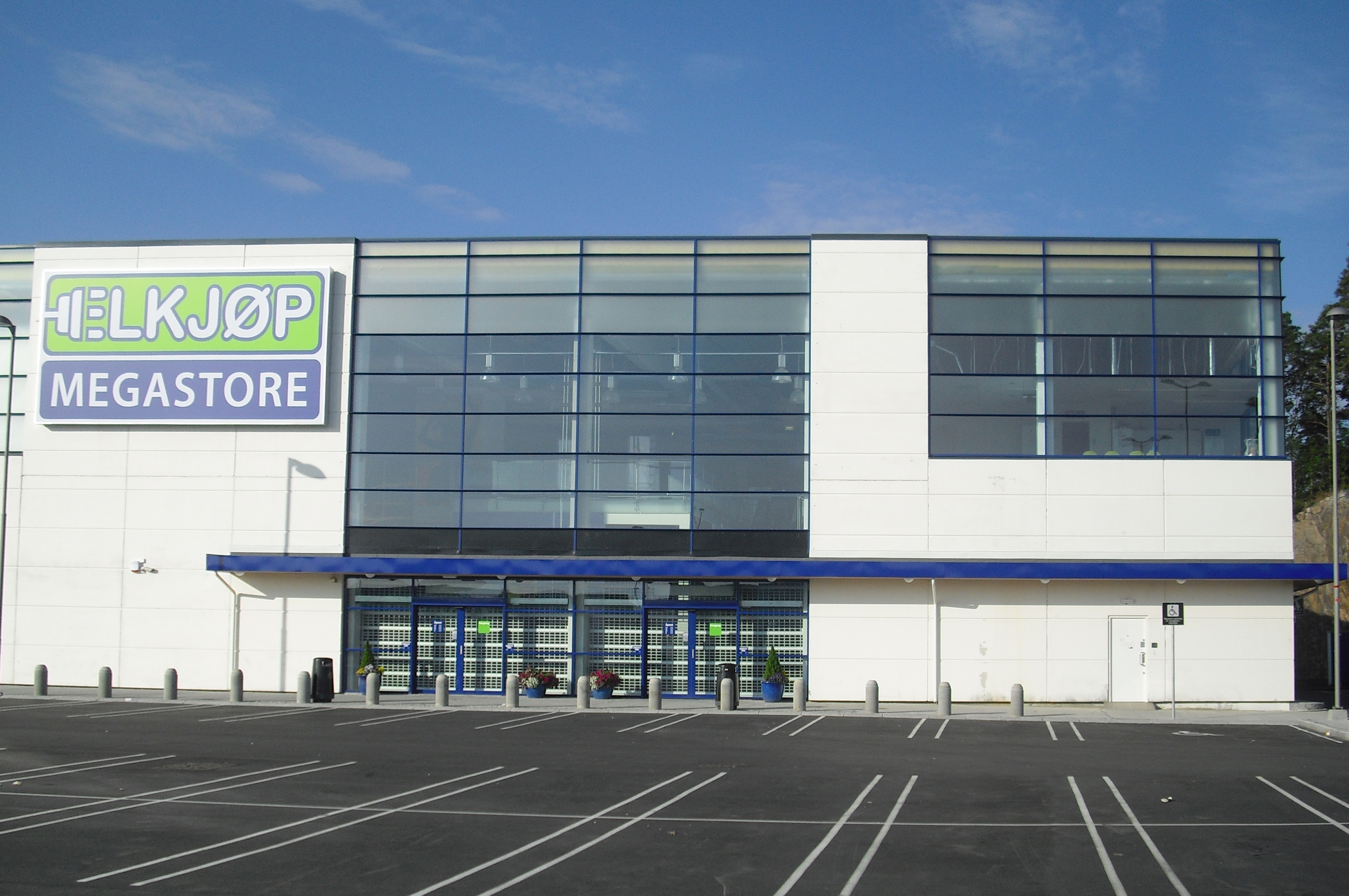
Elkjøp Megastore, Kristiansand (July 2009)

Elkjøp, better known as Elgiganten outside Norway, is the largest consumer electronics retailer in the Nordic countries with four hundred stores in six countries and 24,000 employees. Elkjøp was founded by Trygve Fjetland on 16 March 1962. It was purchased in November 1999 by Currys plc. Elkjøp owned stores for a time in the Czech Republic and Slovakia.

The coined name Elkjøp translates from Norwegian as El purchase, where El is understood as shorthand for elektrisk (“electric”) or elektronisk (“electronic”). The company operated as an independent company with its own management and leadership. It merged with Elkjøp on 15 January 2018.

== Operations ==
Elkjøp currently trades under several different brands:

Country	Local name	Number of stores
Denmark	Elgiganten	48
Faroe Islands	Elding	2
Finland	Gigantti	27
Greenland	Elgiganten	2
Iceland	Elko	7
Norway	Elkjøp/Elkjøp Phonehouse	140
Sweden	Elgiganten/Elgiganten Phone House	172
