= Elgiganten =

Swedish/Danish consumer electronics retailer owned by British Currys plc

Elgiganten A/S
- Company type: Subsidiary
- Industry: Retail
- Founded: 1996
- Headquarters: Copenhagen, Denmark
- Key people: Peder Stedal (CEO)
- Products: Consumer electronics
- Revenue: DKK 5,862 million (2016/2017)
- Operating income: DKK 71 million (2016/2017)
- Parent: Elkjøp (Holger)
- Website: www.elgiganten.dk

Elgiganten AB
- Company type: Subsidiary
- Industry: Retail
- Founded: 1993
- Headquarters: Kista, Sweden
- Key people: Niclas Eriksson (CEO)
- Products: Consumer electronics
- Revenue: SEK 11,9 billions(2018)
- Operating income: SEK 188,5 million(2018)
- Parent: Elkjøp (Currys plc)
- Website: www.elgiganten.se

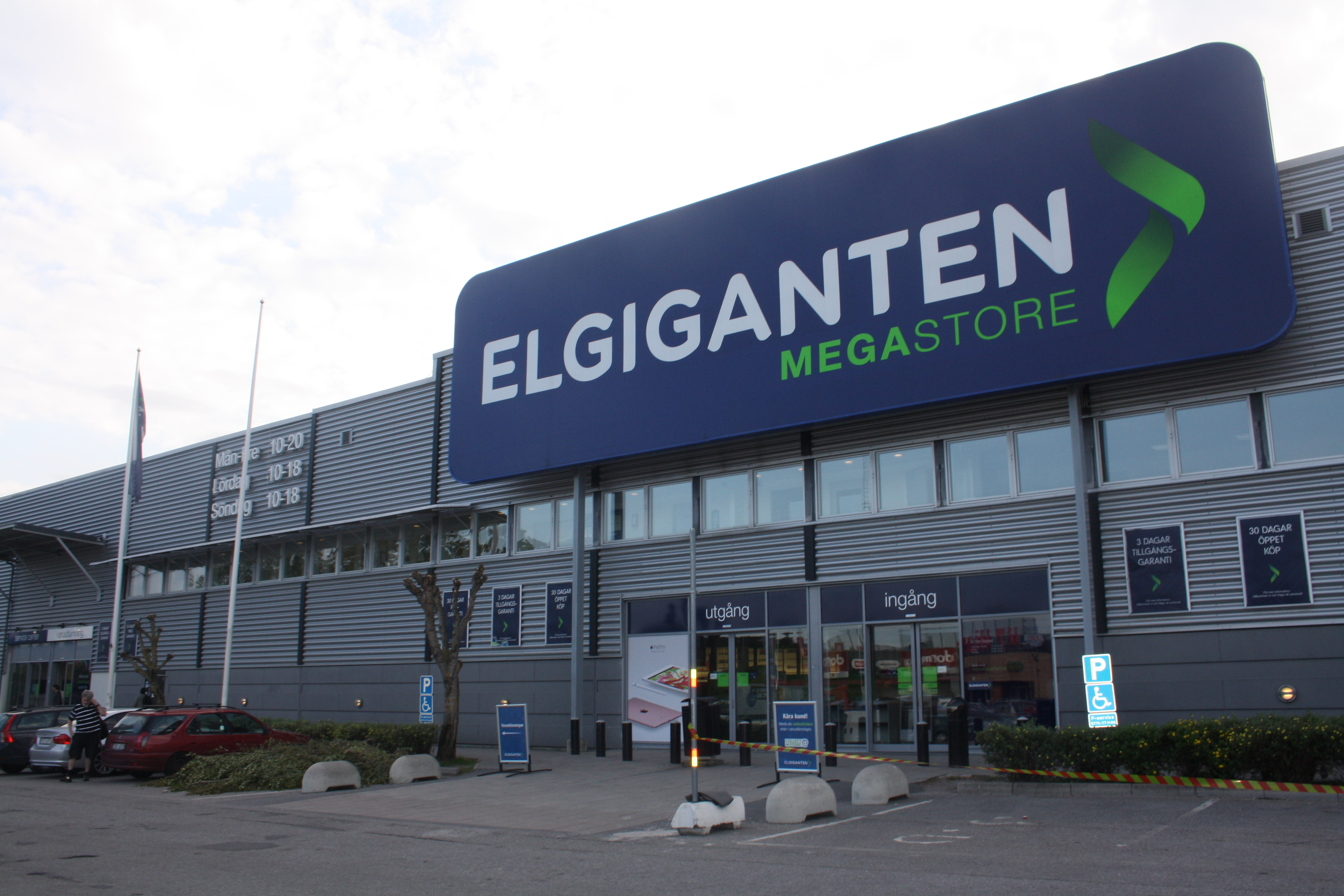
An Elgiganten store in Kungens Kurva, Stockholm, 2016

Elgiganten is a consumer electronics retailer operating in Denmark (including Greenland) and Sweden, where its parent Elkjøp operates in Norway and have subsidiaries like Gigantti (Finland), Elko (Iceland) and Elding (Faroe Islands). There are Elgiganten A/S (Denmark) and Elgiganten AB (Sweden) both directly operated under Elkjøp Nordic AS.

Currently, Peder Stedal is Managing Director of Elgiganten A/S and Niclas Eriksson is Managing Director of Elgiganten AB. In 2009, English actor John Cleese participated in adverts running on Danish, Swedish, Norwegian and Finnish television to promote the company. On May 16, 2014, it became clear that Dixons Retail, owner of Elgiganten and The Carphone Warehouse, owner of Phone House in Sweden, are merging. The new company is called Dixons Carphone has changed its name to Dixons Carphone since September 2021.
