= Alex Baldock =

British businessman (born 1970)

- Born: Alexander David Baldock; 21 November 1970 (age 56)
- Education: Oundle School
- Alma mater: Worcester College, Oxford
- Occupation: Businessman
- Title: CEO, Boots UK
- Term: September 2026 –
- Predecessor: Sebastian James
- Spouse: Amy Roberts
- Children: 4

Alexander David Baldock (born 21 November 1970) is a British businessman and former banker, and the chief executive (CEO) of Boots UK since September 2026.

== Early life ==
Alexander David Baldock was born in November 1970. He was educated at Oundle School, followed by a degree in modern history from Worcester College, Oxford.

== Career ==
Baldock started his career as a management consultant at Kalchas, before joining Barclays. From 2008 to 2012, Baldock worked for the asset finance company, Lombard, a division of RBS Group, rising to managing director.

In 2012, Baldock joined Shop Direct as CEO. In October 2017, Baldock announced that he would be leaving Shop Direct at the end of January 2018.

In January 2018, Sebastian James resigned as CEO of Dixons Carphone, to run Boots UK, "in a surprise move days before it updates the City on its Christmas trading performance", and was succeeded by Baldock, who had been CEO of the online retailer Shop Direct since 2012. Two months into his tenure at Dixons Carphone he launched a scathing attack on his predecessor declaring that he had found “plenty to fix” at the retailer in a classic example of kitchen sinking.

In May 2026, Boots announced the appointment of Baldock as chief executive officer (CEO). Baldock took up the role on 2 September 2026.

He is a Conservative Party donor. He was paid £1 million per year as CEO of Currys plc. His salary as CEO of Boots (company) has not been publicly disclosed.

== Personal life ==
Baldock is married to garden designer Amy Roberts, and they have four children. He is a supporter of Chelsea F.C.
