= Charles Kalms =

British retailer (1897–1978)

Charles Kalms (1897–1978) was a British retailer and founder of the Dixons chains that expanded to become the UK's largest electrical retail chain.

== Career ==
Kalms opened the first Dixons photographic studio at 32 High Street, Southend-on-Sea. The business was incorporated as a private company called Dixon Studios Limited and registered on 27 October 1937 with share capital of £100.

Charles Kalms had been selling advertising space on the London Underground when he met Michael Mindel, who had a small photographic studio in Oxford Street but was keen to expand. They became the first directors of the company. When the first studio opened in Southend, the shop front could accommodate a name of no more than six letters. The solution was found in the telephone directory - "Dixons" was short enough to fit over the door.

The business expanded during the Second World War as demand for photographic portraits surged, particularly from service personnel and their families. The company flourished and set up seven studios in the London area. But by the end of the war, the market contracted as dramatically as it had expanded and the company was reduced to a single studio in Edgware, north London.

He and his wife, Sarah "Cissie" Shlagman had a son, Stanley Kalms (later Lord Kalms of Edgware), who joined the business in 1948 at the age of 16. He capitalised on post-war interest in photography. The company began advertising new and second-hand photographic equipment in the trade, local and national press. This laid the foundations for a mail order division which, coupled with "make your own terms" hire-purchase agreements, eventually resulted in a rapid increase in retailing outlets and in Dixons Photographic Limited becoming the dominant photographic equipment retailer in the UK.

In 1971, Charles Kalms stood down as chairman and was succeeded by Stanley. Charles became Life President of the Group.
