= Currys plc =

British retail company

- Formerly: Dixons Carphone plc (2014–2021)
- Type: Public limited company
- Traded as: LSE: CURY; FTSE 250 Component
- Industry: Consumer electronics
- Predecessors: Dixons Carphone; Dixons Retail; Carphone Warehouse Group
- Founded: 7 August 2014; 12 years ago
- Headquarters: Newark-on-Trent
- Number of locations: 727 stores (2024)
- Area served: United Kingdom; Ireland; Nordics
- Key people: Ian Dyson (Chairman); Fredrik Tønnesen (Group Chief Executive)
- Brands: Currys; PC World (1994–2021); Geek Squad UK (2006–2017); Dixons Retail (1937–2014)
- Revenue: ▲£9,254 million (2026)
- Operating income: ▲£220 million (2026)
- Net income: ▲£165 million (2026)
- Total assets: ▲£5,627 million (2026)
- Total equity: ▲£2,408 million (2026)
- Number of employees: 24,000 (2026)
- Subsidiaries: Elkjøp Nordic AS: Elgiganten; Gigantti; Elko; Elding; Currys iD Mobile Carphone Warehouse
- Website: currysplc.com

Currys plc (formerly Dixons Carphone plc) is a British multinational electrical and telecommunications retailer, and services company headquartered in Newark-on-Trent, England, which was formed in 2014 by the merger of Dixons Retail and Carphone Warehouse Group. It is listed on the London Stock Exchange and is a constituent of the FTSE 250 Index.

The company operates under a number of brands in the United Kingdom, Ireland and mainland Europe. These include Currys in the United Kingdom and Ireland and Elkjøp, Elgiganten and Gigantti in the Nordics.

== History ==
Following shareholder agreement in July 2014, the £3.8 billion merged entity was launched on 7 August 2014; on the first day of trading the shares in the merged business were owned 50:50 by the former Dixons Retail and former Carphone Warehouse shareholders. Carphone Warehouse's Sir Charles Dunstone was appointed chairman, and Sebastian James became chief executive.

On the first day of trading, the company opened Carphone Warehouse concessions in seven PC World or Currys stores. In December 2016, Dixons and SSE, a domestic energy supplier, announced a partnership to provide "connected home" services in the United Kingdom.

In January 2018, Sebastian James resigned as chief executive to become president and managing director of Boots UK. Alex Baldock left his previous role as chief executive of Shop Direct (the company responsible for brands such as Very and Littlewoods) to succeed James as chief executive of Dixons Carphone.

In March 2019, Dixons Carphone was given a £29.1m fine from the Financial Conduct Authority (FCA) for mis-selling its Geek Squad services. The FCA found that the company's staff were trained to sell the service to customers who already had an insurance cover. During the period under investigation, between 1 December 2008 and 30 June 2015, Carphone Warehouse sold Geek Squad policies worth more than £444.7m. Dixons Carphone did not contest the FCA's findings and qualified for a 30% discount, reducing the fine from £41.6m.

In June 2019, shares in Dixons Carphone fell almost 20% following a significant decline in full year profits, mainly caused by consumers' growing delay in upgrading their mobile phones.

On 3 April 2020, the company permanently closed 531 stand-alone Carphone Warehouse stores that were solely focused on telephone devices. Subsequently, 3,000 job positions related to the affected stores were cut. According to the firm, the reason behind the closure of the stores was the online shift of customers and a lesser extent of phone upgrades.

Following the spread of the COVID-19 pandemic, on 4 August 2020, Dixons Carphone announced 800 job cuts in response to increased costs. The company also announced plans to re-organise its operations in its bigger stores. Regarding the decision, the firm's chief operating officer stated that they wanted "to empower store leadership teams, create a flatter management structure and make it easy for customers to shop with us."

The business was renamed from Dixons Carphone to Currys plc in September 2021. The Currys brand also replaced the company's former retail brands, including PC World, Team Knowhow and Carphone Warehouse.

In June 2023, Frasers Group acquired a stake in Currys, which would increase during the year.

In November 2023, Currys announced that they would be selling their Greek and Cypriot business, Kotsovolos, and would be leaving the South Eastern European market. Outside the UK and Ireland, the company would do business only in the Nordic countries.

On 17 February 2024, Sky News reported that Elliott Investment Management was interested in buying Currys for £700M; Currys turned down the offer. A leading shareholder in Currys demanded that the company's board not engage with potential suitor Elliott Advisors unless it proposed a minimum offer of 75p-a-share, valuing the retailer at around £800m, amid claims that a 62p-a-share offer from Elliott undervalued the company.

In June 2026, Currys announced the appointment of Fredrik Tonnesen as its new CEO, replacing Alex Baldock, who announced his resignation in March 2026.

== Operations ==
The company owns the following brands:

=== United Kingdom and Ireland ===
- Currys – specialises in home electronics, household appliances and computing
- iD Mobile – a mobile virtual network operator (UK only)
- Carphone Warehouse – online retailer of mobile handsets (closed physical concessions in 2020)

=== Nordics (Elkjøp Nordic) ===
- Elkjøp – ("Electrical Buy") sells home electronics and household appliances in Norway
- Elgiganten – ("Electrical Giant") sells home electronics and household appliances in Denmark and Sweden, franchised by Pisiffik on Greenland
- Gigantti – ("Giant") sells home electronics and household appliances in Finland
- Elko – franchise owned by Festi hf that uses the same brand markers, selling home electronics and household appliances in Iceland
- Elding Elrisin – Elgiganten franchise on the Faroe Islands

=== Former brands ===
==== Former retail brands ====
Brand	Description	Founded	Ceased
Dixons	A high-street retailer of consumer electronics in the United Kingdom and Ireland	1937	2012
PC World	A retail chain of mass-market computer megastores	1991	2021
Dixons Travel	A technology retailer operating in airports	1994	2021

==== Former operational brands ====
Brand	Description	Founded	Ceased
Kotsovolos	Greek electronics retailer	2000 (2005 acquisition)	2023
Geek Squad UK	A provider of aftersales and insurance for Carphone Warehouse	2006	2017
Tech Guys	An operational services brand for Currys and PC World stores	2006	2010
Knowhow	An operational services and aftersales brand for Currys and PC World stores as well as Elkjøp-brands in the Nordics	2010	2017 (UK) 2020 (Nordics)
Team Knowhow	An operational and aftersales services brand for Currys PC World and Carphone Warehouse stores	2017	2021

== Leadership ==
The company's board is chaired by Ian Livingston. The non-executive directors are Andrea Gisle Joosen, Eileen Burbidge, Fiona McBain, Gerry Murphy and Tony DeNunzio. The CEO of Currys plc is Alex Baldock, appointed in 2018. The CFO of the business is Bruce Marsh, appointed in July 2021.

== Data security breaches ==
The group was fined £400,000 by the Information Commissioner in January 2018, as a result of unauthorised access to the personal data of over three million customers in 2015. A further security breach, said to affect 1.2 million customers, was reported by the company in June 2018. The number of customers affected was later increased to 10 million.
