= Endorsements in the 2016 United Kingdom European Union membership referendum =

Politician and celebrity support for or against Brexit during its lead-up

A number of politicians, public figures, newspapers and magazines, businesses and other organisations endorsed either the United Kingdom remaining in the EU or the United Kingdom leaving the EU during the 2016 United Kingdom European Union membership referendum.

== Remain ==
=== Government ===
==== Territories voting in referendum ====
- Government of the United Kingdom
- Scottish Government
- Welsh Government
- Government of Gibraltar

==== Other Crown dependencies ====
- Government of Jersey
- Government of Guernsey

==== Non-UK governments ====
- Government of Ireland
- Government of Japan

=== Registered political parties ===
Parties organised in more than one of the Home Nations:

- Green Party of England and Wales
- Labour Party
- Left Unity
- Liberal Democrats

Parties in Scotland:

- Scottish National Party (SNP)
- Scottish Green Party
- Scottish Socialist Party

Parties in Northern Ireland:

- Alliance Party of Northern Ireland
- Green Party in Northern Ireland
- NI21
- Sinn Féin
- Social Democratic and Labour Party (SDLP)
- Ulster Unionist Party (UUP)

Parties in Wales:

- Plaid Cymru

Parties in Gibraltar:

- Gibraltar Social Democrats
- Gibraltar Socialist Labour Party
- Liberal Party of Gibraltar

Other regional parties:

- Mebyon Kernow

=== Business leaders ===
- Alexander Asseily, founder, Jawbone, State and Chiaro
- Alice Bentinck, co-founder, Entrepreneur First
- Sir Victor Blank, former chairman of Lloyds Bank, philanthropist
- Michael Bloomberg, CEO of Bloomberg L.P. and former mayor of New York City
- Marc Bolland, former CEO of Marks & Spencer, former CEO of Morrisons
- Sir Richard Branson, entrepreneur, investor and philanthropist
- Warren Buffett, American investor, chairman & CEO of Berkshire Hathaway
- Eileen Burbidge, partner, Passion Capital
- Efe Cakarel, founder and CEO, MUBI
- Alex Chesterman, founder and CEO, Zoopla Property Group
- Alexandra Chong, founder, Lulu
- Sherry Coutu CBE, serial entrepreneur
- James Daunt, founder, Daunt Books, managing director, Waterstones
- Ian Davis, chairman of Rolls-Royce Holdings
- Nicolas De Santis, entrepreneur, Opodo.com
- Julie Deane OBE, founder and CEO, The Cambridge Satchel Company
- Dinesh Dhamija, president, TIE, and founder, ebookers.com
- Jamie Dimon, chairman, president and chief executive officer of JPMorgan Chase
- Lloyd Dorfman CBE, founder, Travelex; and chairman, The Office Group and Doddle
- Tom Enders, CEO of the Airbus Group
- Bill Gates, co-founder of Microsoft
- Carlos Ghosn, chairman and CEO of Renault, Nissan and Renault-Nissan Alliance
- Sir Philip Green, CEO of Arcadia Group
- Guy Hands, founder and chairman of Terra Firma Capital Partners
- Richard Harpin, founder and chief executive, Homeserve
- Philipp Hildebrand, vice-chairman of BlackRock
- Anya Hindmarch, founder, Anya Hindmarch
- Brent Hoberman, co-founder, Founders Factory, lastminute.com, Made.com, Founders.Forum
- António Horta-Osório, CEO of the Lloyds Banking Group
- Sir George Iacobescu, CEO of the Canary Wharf Group
- Karen Jones CBE, co-founder, Café Rouge, and Food and Fuel
- Sir Nicholas Kenyon, managing director of the Barbican Centre
- Justin King, former CEO of Sainsbury's
- Robin Klein, co-founder, LocalGlobe
- Martha Lane Fox, Baroness Lane-Fox CBE, founder of Doteveryone and co-founder of Lucky Voice and lastminute.com
- Sir Terry Leahy, former CEO of Tesco
- Paul Lindley, founder, Ella's Kitchen; and founder and CEO, Paddy's Bathroom
- Ian Livingston, former CEO of the BT Group
- Alastair Lukies CBE, chairman, Innovate Finance
- Mike Lynch OBE, Invoke Capital
- Carolyn McCall, chief executive of EasyJet
- Deborah Meaden, businesswoman and TV personality
- Lakshmi Mittal, chairman and CEO of ArcelorMittal
- Charlie Muirhead, founder and CEO, CognitionX
- Sir Michael Rake, chairman of BT Group
- Richard Reed, founder of Innocent Drinks
- Fabien Riggall, founder and director, Secret Cinema
- Baron Jacob Rothschild, British investment banker and a member of the prominent Rothschild banking family
- Roland Rudd, chairman of Finsbury
- Luke Scheybeler, co-founder, Rapha, and Tracksmith
- Ernesto Schmitt, CEO and co-founder, DriveTribe
- Sir Martin Sorrell, CEO of WPP plc
- Lord Alan Sugar, business magnate, media personality, and political advisor
- Toshiaki Higashihara, Hitachi chief executive
- Martín Varsavsky, founder and chairman, Fon
- Rumi Verjee, founder, Domino's Pizza UK
- Dale Vince, founder, Ecotricity
- Niall Wass, Entrepreneur in Residence, Atomico; and formerly CEO, Wonga
- Simon Woodroffe OBE, founder, YO! Sushi and YOTEL
- Marc Worth, CEO, Stylus Media Group
- Riccardo Zacconi, CEO, King.com
- Niklas Zennström, CEO and founding partner, Atomico

==== Letter to The Times ====
In a letter published in The Times, a wide range of business leaders, including 36 FTSE 100 companies, called for a vote to stay in the European Union. The letter stated that British "business needs unrestricted access to the European market of 500 million people to continue to grow, invest, and create jobs. We believe that leaving the EU would deter investment, threaten jobs, and put the economy at risk. Britain will be stronger, safer, and better off remaining a member of the EU".

- Tim Allen, managing director, M J Allen Group
- Rooney Anand, chief executive, Greene King
- David Atkins, chief executive, Hammerson
- Christopher Bailey MBE, chief executive, Burberry Group
- Ian Baxter, chairman, Baxter Freight
- Marc Bolland CEO, Marks & Spencer
- Peter Callahan, director, Diamond Dispersions
- Sir Roger Carr, chairman, BAE Systems
- Richard John Carter, managing director, BASF
- Andy Clarke, chief executive, Asda
- Iain C. Conn, chief executive, Centrica, Utilities
- Ron Dennis CBE, CEO and chairman, McLaren Group
- Una Driscoll, managing director, Belt up Kidz
- Bob Dudley, chief executive, BP
- Mark Elborne, UK chief executive, General Electric
- Paul Evans, group chief executive, AXA UK & Ireland
- Tony Fernandes, group chief executive, AirAsia, and founder, Tune Group
- James Farley, executive vice-president and president, Europe, Ford
- Martha Lane Fox CBE, co-founder, Doteveryone and Lastminute.com
- Richard Gnodde, co-chief executive, Goldman Sachs
- Jacqueline Gold CBE, chief executive, Ann Summers
- Tom Gosnell, managing director, Gosnells Beverages
- Philip Green, chairman, Carillion
- Chris Grigg, chief executive, British Land
- Greg Hodkinson, chairman, Arup
- Kelly Hoppen MBE, director, Kelly Hoppen Interiors
- Sir Julian Horn-Smith, advisory board member, Letter One Technology
- George Iacobescu CBE, chairman and chief executive, Canary Wharf Group
- Seb James, chief executive, Dixons Carphone
- Paul Kahn, president, Airbus UK
- Michael Keegan, executive director, EMEIA, Fujitsu
- Laurent Lacassagne, chairman and chief executive, Chivas Brothers
- Martin Lamb, director, Maple Consulting
- Sonny Leong, chief executive, Civil Service College
- Pascal Soriot, chief executive, AstraZeneca
- Sir Adrian Montague CBE, chairman, Aviva
- Peter Rogers, chief executive, Babcock International Group
- Andrew Mackenzie, chief executive, BHP
- Dr Ian Robertson, board member, BMW
- Sir Alan Parker, chairman, Brunswick Group
- Sir Mike Rake, chairman, BT Group
- Gavin Patterson, chief executive, BT Group
- Sir John Peace, chairman, Burberry Group
- Christopher Satterthwaite, chief executive, Chime Communications Group
- Phil Smith, chief executive, UK and Ireland, Cisco
- Paul Walsh, chairman, Compass Group
- Professor Geeta Nargund, founder and chief executive, CREATE Health
- Tidjane Thiam, chief executive, Credit Suisse
- Kathryn Parsons, co-founder and chief executive, Decoded
- Ivan Menezes, chief executive, Diageo
- Dame Carolyn McCall, chief executive; EasyJet
- Roland Rudd, chairman; FinsburyMedia
- Stewart Wingate, chief executive, Gatwick Airport
- Nigel Stein, chief executive, GKN
- Michael Sherwood, co-chief executive, Goldman Sachs
- Sir Andrew Witty, chief executive, GlaxoSmithKline
- Jenny Halpern Prince, chief executive, Halpern
- Douglas Flint CBE, Ccairman, HSBC
- Stuart Gulliver, chief executive, HSBC
- Rupert Pearce CEO, Inmarsat Tech
- Ralf Speth KBE, CEO, Jaguar Land Rover
- Katharine Pooley, chief executive and owner, Katharine Pooley Interior design
- Veronique Laury CEO, Kingfisher
- John Nelson, chairman, Lloyd's of London
- Christopher Parker, managing director, London & Scottish International
- Xavier Rolet KBE CEO, London Stock Exchange
- Debbie Wosskow, chief executive officer, Love Home Swap
- Rick Haythornthwaite, chairman, Mastercard
- Karen Blackett OBE, chairwoman, Mediacom
- Sir Nigel Rudd, chairman, Meggitt
- Kanya King MBE, CEO and founder, MOBO Organisations
- Alan Parker CBE, chairman, Mothercare
- Dean Finch, CEO, National Express Group
- Steve Holliday, CEO, National Grid
- Mary Nelson, director, Nelson Browne Management
- Sam Laidlaw, chairman, Neptune Oil and Gas
- Stuart Rose, chairman, Ocado
- Tim Steiner, CEO, Ocado
- John Fallon, CEO, Pearson Publishing
- Ayman Asfari, CEO, Petrofac
- Mike Wells, group chief executive, Prudential
- Gail Rebuck DBE, chairman, Random House
- Graham Chipchase, chief executive, Rexam
- Sir Peter Rigby, CEO & chairman, Rigby Group
- Jan du Plessis, chairman, Rio Tinto
- Warren East CBE, CEO, Rolls-Royce
- Ben van Beurden CEO, Royal Dutch Shell
- Stephen Hester CEO, RSA Insurance Group
- Michael O'Leary, chief executive, Ryanair
- Alan Clark, CEO, SABMiller
- Shriti Vadera, chair, Santander UK
- Nathan Bostock, CEO, Santander UK
- Caroline Cole, director, Savoir Faire Accounting
- Rupert Soames OBE, CEO, Serco Infrastructure
- Simon Barrow, director, Simon Barrow Associates
- Bill Winters, CEO, Standard Chartered
- Dido Harding, chief executive, TalkTalk
- Dr Heather McGregor CBE, CEO, Taylor Bennett
- Ronan Dunne, chief executive, Telefonica O2 UK
- Sally Greene OBE, chief executive, The Old Vic
- Lady Ruth Rogers MBE, owner, The River Café
- Lloyd Dorfman, president, Travelex
- Peter Long, supervisory board member and former chief executive, TUI Travel
- Rakesh Sharma, chief executive, Ultra Electronics
- Paul Polman, CEO, Unilever
- Lucian Grainge CBE, chairman and CEO, Universal Music Group
- Luis Arriaga, managing director, UPS UK
- Tom Mockridge, chief executive, Virgin Media
- Jayne-Anne Gadhia, CEO, Virgin Money UK
- Ian Taylor, CEO and president, Vitol
- Vittorio Colao, CEO Vodafone
- Sir Peter Kendall, director, W J Kendall Contracting
- Stefano Pessina, executive vice-chairman and CEO, Walgreens Boots Alliance
- Keith Cochrane, chief executive, Weir Group
- Terry Matthews, chairman, Wesley Clover
- Karren Brady, vice-chairman, West Ham United Football Club
- Sir Martin Sorrell, CEO, WPP

=== Politicians ===
Only politicians who held positions that differed from the party line or whose party was officially neutral are listed here.

==== Conservative Party ====
Within the Conservative Party (which was officially neutral), 25 of the 30 Cabinet Ministers including the Prime Minister, specifically:

- David Cameron (Prime Minister)
- Stephen Crabb (Work and Pensions Secretary following the resignation of the Eurosceptic Iain Duncan Smith)
- Philip Hammond (Foreign Secretary)
- Jeremy Hunt (Health Secretary)
- Michael Fallon (Defence Secretary)
- Sajid Javid (Business Secretary)
- Theresa May (Home Secretary)
- Patrick McLoughlin (Transport Secretary)
- Nicky Morgan (Education Secretary)
- David Mundell (Secretary of State for Scotland)
- George Osborne (Chancellor)
- Liz Truss (Environment Secretary)
- Joyce Anelay (Minister of State for Foreign and Commonwealth Affairs)
- Alun Cairns (Secretary of State for Wales)
- Greg Clark (Secretary of State for Communities and Local Government)
- Justine Greening (Secretary of State for International Development)
- Robert Halfon (Minister without Portfolio)
- Matt Hancock (Paymaster General and Minister for the Cabinet Office)
- Greg Hands (Chief Secretary to the Treasury)
- Mark Harper (Parliamentary Secretary to the Treasury Government Chief Whip in the House of Commons)
- Oliver Letwin (Chancellor of the Duchy of Lancaster)
- Amber Rudd (Secretary of State for Energy and Climate Change)
- Anna Soubry (Minister of State for Small Business, Industry and Enterprise)
- Tina Stowell (Leader of the House of Lords)
- Jeremy Wright (Attorney General for England and Wales and Advocate General for Northern Ireland)

Others included former Prime Minister John Major, former party leader William Hague, former Deputy Prime Minister Michael Heseltine, David Willetts, former Chancellor of the Exchequer Kenneth Clarke, and former ministers Edwina Currie and Baroness Warsi (who, it was alleged, supported Leave, despite the Vote Leave side not being aware of her support prior to the allegations).

The majority of the Conservative Party's 330 MPs announced that they would campaign for Britain to remain in the European Union. Including cabinet ministers, the list included:

- Graham Stuart (Beverley and Holderness)
- Amanda Milling (Cannock Chase)
- Mel Stride (Central Devon)
- Alex Chalk (Cheltenham)
- Chris Philp (Croydon South)
- Hugo Swire (East Devon)
- Antoinette Sandbach (Eddisbury)
- Maggie Throup (Erewash)
- Angela Watkinson (Hornchurch and Upminster)
- Sir Paul Beresford (Mole Valley)
- Robert Jenrick (Newark)
- David Mackintosh (Northampton South)
- Rob Wilson (Reading East)
- Lucy Frazer (South East Cambridgeshire)
- Luke Hall (Thornbury and Yate)
- Tom Tugendhat (Tonbridge and Malling)
- Tania Mathias (Twickenham)
- Alun Cairns (Vale of Glamorgan)
- David Mowat (Warrington South)
- Graham Evans (Weaver Vale)
- Steve Brine (Winchester)
- Guto Bebb (Aberconwy)
- Nick Herbert (Arundel and South Downs)
- Damian Green (Ashford)
- David Lidington (Aylesbury)
- Victoria Prentis (Banbury)
- Mark Lancaster (North East Milton Keynes)
- Maria Miller (Basingstoke)
- Ben Howlett (Bath)
- Jane Ellison (Battersea)
- Dominic Grieve (Beaconsfield)
- David Evennett (Bexleyheath and Crayford)
- Paul Maynard (Blackpool North and Cleveleys)
- Nick Gibb (Bognor Regis and Littlehampton)
- Matt Warman (Boston and Skegness)
- Tobias Ellwood (Bournemouth East)
- Eric Pickles (Brentwood and Ongar)
- Simon Kirby (Brighton Kemptown)
- Keith Simpson (Broadland)
- Bob Neill (Bromley and Chislehurt)
- Sajid Javid (Bromsgrove)
- Anna Soubry (Broxtowe)
- Andrew Griffiths (Burton)
- Jo Churchill (Bury St Edmunds)
- Craig Whittaker (Calder Valley)
- Craig Williams (Cardiff North)
- Simon Hart (Carmarthen West and South Pembrokeshire)
- John Stevenson (Carlisle)
- Dan Poulter (Central Suffolk and North Ipswich)
- Edward Argar (Charnwood)
- Simon Burns (Chelmsford)
- Greg Hands (Chelsea and Fulham)
- Michelle Donelan (Chippenham)
- Mark Field (Cities of London and Westminster)
- Edward Timpson (Crewe and Nantwich)
- Gavin Barwell (Croydon Central)
- Patrick McLoughlin (Derbyshire Dales)
- Claire Perry (Devizes)
- Charlie Elphicke (Dover)
- David Mundell (Dumfriesshire, Clydesdale and Tweeddale)
- Damian Hinds (East Hampshire)
- Sam Gyimah (East Surrey)
- Alec Shelbrooke (Elmet and Rothwell)
- Mike Freer (Finchley and Golders Green)
- Damian Collins (Folkestone and Hythe)
- Mark Harper (Forest of Dean)
- Mark Menzies (Fylde)
- Richard Graham (Gloucester)
- Caroline Dinenage (Gosport)
- Byron Davies (Gower)
- Nick Boles (Grantham and Stamford)
- Brandon Lewis (Great Yarmouth)
- James Morris (Halesowen and Rowley Regis)
- Sir Edward Garnier (Harborough)
- Robert Halfon (Harlow)
- Andrew Jones (Harrogate and Knaresborough)
- Amber Rudd (Hastings and Rye)
- Alan Mak (Havant)
- John Howell (Henley)
- Mark Prisk (Hertford and Stortford)
- Oliver Dowden (Hertsmere)
- Guy Opperman (Hexham)
- Jeremy Quin (Horsham)
- Jonathan Djanogly (Huntingdon)
- Ben Gummer (Ipswich)
- Kris Hopkins (Keighley)
- Jeremy Wright (Kenilworth and Southam)
- James Berry (Kingston and Surbiton)
- Chris Skidmore (Kingswood)
- Nicky Morgan (Loughborough)
- Victoria Atkins (Louth and Horncastle)
- Phillip Dunne (Ludlow)
- David Rutley (Macclesfield)
- Theresa May (Maidenhead)
- Helen Grant (Maidstone and The Weald)
- Caroline Spelman (Meriden)
- George Freeman (Mid Norfolk)
- Sir Nicholas Soames (Mid Sussex)
- Nigel Huddleston (Mid Worcestershire)
- George Hollingbery (Meon Valley)
- David Morris (Morecambe and Lunesdale)
- Richard Benyon (Newbury)
- Peter Heaton-Jones (North Devon)
- Simon Hoare (North Dorset)
- Alistair Burt (North East Bedfordshire)
- Oliver Heald (North East Hertfordshire)
- Michael Ellis (Northampton North)
- Roger Gale (North Thanet)
- Shailesh Vara (North West Cambridgeshire)
- Chloe Smith (Norwich North)
- Marcus Jones (Nuneaton)
- James Brokenshire (Old Bexley and Sidcup)
- Jo Johnson (Orpington)
- Nicola Blackwood (Oxford West and Abingdon)
- Rory Stewart (Penrith and The Border)
- Oliver Colvile (Plymouth Sutton and Devonport)
- Flick Drummond (Portsmouth South)
- Stephen Crabb (Preseli Pembrokeshire)
- Justine Greening (Putney)
- Alok Sharma (Reading West)
- Jake Berry (Rossendale and Darwen)
- Mark Pawsey (Rugby)
- Nick Hurd (Ruslip Northwood and Pinner)
- Kenneth Clarke (Rushcliffe)
- Sir Alan Duncan (Rutland and Melton)
- Sir Alan Haselhurst (South Walden)
- John Glen (Salisbury)
- Robert Goodwill (scarborough and Whitby)
- Michael Fallon (Sevenoaks)
- Mark Spencer (Sherwood)
- Julian Smith (Skipton and Ripon)
- Julian Knight (Solihull)
- Heidi Allen (South Cambridgeshire)
- Alberto Costa (South Leicestershire)
- Gavin Williamson (South Staffordshire)
- James Cartlidge (South Suffolk)
- Robert Buckland (South Swindon)
- Gary Streeter (South West Devon)
- Philip Hammond (Runnymede and Weybridge)
- Andrew Selous (South West Bedfordshire)
- David Gauke (South West Hertfordshire)
- Liz Truss (South West Norfolk)
- Jeremy Hunt (South West Surrey)
- Therese Coffey (Suffolk Coastal)
- Jeremy Lefroy (Stafford)
- Karen Bradley (Staffordshire Moorlands)
- Margot James (Stourbridge)
- Neil Carmichael (Stroud)
- George Osborne (Tatton)
- Rebecca Pow (Taunton Deane)
- Dr. Sarah Wollaston (Totnes)
- Mark Pritchard (The Wrekin)
- Kevin Hollinrake (Thirsk and Malton)
- Neil Parish (Tiverton and Honiton)
- Kevin Foster (Torbay)
- Sarah Newton (Truro and Falmouth)
- Greg Clark (Tunbridge Wells)
- Ed Vaizey (Wantage)
- Chris White (Warwick and Leamington
- Richard Harrington (Watford))
- Peter Aldous (Waveney)
- James Heappey (Wells)
- Grant Shapps (Welwyn Hatfield)
- Oliver Letwin (West Dorset)
- Matt Hancock (West Suffolk)
- Harriett Baldwin (West Worcestershire)
- John Penrose (Weston-Super-Mare)
- Stephen Hammond (Wimbledon)
- David Cameron (Witney)
- Robin Walker (Worcester)
- Peter Bottomley (Worthing West)
- Ben Wallace (Wyre and Preston North)
- Mark Garnier (Wyre Forest)

The list of Conservative Members of the European Parliament (MEPs) that announced that they would campaign for Britain to remain in the European Union is:

- Richard Ashworth (South East England)
- Daniel Dalton (West Midlands)
- Vicky Ford (East of England)
- Jacqueline Foster (North West England)
- Ashley Fox (South West England)
- Julie Girling (South West England)
- Sajjad Karim (North West England)
- Timothy Kirkhope (Yorkshire and the Humber)
- Anthea McIntyre (West Midlands)
- Kay Swinburne (Wales)
- Charles Tannock (London)

Other Conservatives supporting a Remain vote were:

- Stephen Greenhalgh, the deputy London mayor until May 2016
- Stanley Johnson, former Conservative MEP and environmentalist, father of Vote Leave campaigner Boris Johnson
- Chris Patten, former chairman of the Conservative Party
- Ruth Davidson, Leader of the Scottish Conservative Party

Scottish Conservative MSPs also included Miles Briggs, Peter Chapman, Jackson Carlaw, John Lamont, Alex Johnstone, Rachael Hamilton, Liz Smith, Donald Cameron, Adam Tomkins, Douglas Ross, Brian Whittle, Finlay Carson and Annie Wells.

==== Independent ====
- Jeffrey Evans, 4th Baron Mountevans, Lord Mayor of London
- Sylvia Hermon (MP for North Down)

=== International figures ===
==== From other European Union member states ====
- Magdalena Andersson, Minister of Finance of Sweden
- Silvio Berlusconi, former prime minister of Italy
- John Bruton, former prime minister of Republic of Ireland
- António Costa, prime minister of Portugal
- Mario Draghi, president of the European Central Bank
- Euripides Evriviades, High Commissioner to the UK of Cyprus
- Charles Flanagan, Minister for Foreign Affairs and Trade of the Republic of Ireland
- Rebecca Harms MEP, co-chair of The Greens–European Free Alliance
- François Hollande, president of France
- Klaus Iohannis, president of Romania
- Enda Kenny, taoiseach (prime minister) of Republic of Ireland
- Aleksander Kwaśniewski, former president of Poland (1995–2005)
- Christine Lagarde, managing director of the International Monetary Fund
- Pascal Lamy, former Director-General of the World Trade Organization (2005–2013)
- Stefan Löfven, prime minister of Sweden
- Emmanuel Macron, Minister of the Economy, Industry and Digital Affairs of France
- Angela Merkel, chancellor of Germany
- Joseph Muscat, prime minister of Malta
- Pier Carlo Padoan, Italian Minister of Economy and Finances
- Gianni Pittella MEP, chair of the Progressive Alliance of Socialists and Democrats
- Mariano Rajoy, prime minister of Spain
- Anders Fogh Rasmussen, former Secretary-General of NATO (2009–14) and former prime minister of Denmark
- Matteo Renzi, prime minister of Italy
- Taavi Roivas, prime minister of Estonia
- Mark Rutte, prime minister of the Netherlands
- Nicolas Sarkozy, former president of France
- Wolfgang Schäuble, Minister of Finance of Germany
- Jaap De Hoop Scheffer, former Secretary-General of NATO (2004–09)
- Radosław Sikorski, former Minister of Foreign Affairs of Poland
- Juha Sipilä, prime minister of Finland
- Bohuslav Sobotka, prime minister of Czech Republic
- Javier Solana, former Secretary-General of NATO (1995–99) and former Secretary-General of the Council of the European Union (1999–2009)
- Donald Tusk, president of the European Council
- Yanis Varoufakis former Minister of Finance of Greece
- Guy Verhofstadt MEP, chair of the Alliance of Liberals and Democrats for Europe Group
- Willem-Alexander of the Netherlands, king of the Netherlands

==== Other countries ====
- Kofi Annan, former Secretary-General of the United Nations (1997–2006)
- Shinzo Abe, prime minister of Japan (2006–07, 2012–2020)
- Michelle Bachelet, former President of Chile (2006–10, 2014–2018)
- Roberto Balzaretti, Swiss Ambassador to the European Union
- Justin Trudeau, prime minister of Canada (2015–2025)
- Kim Campbell, former prime minister of Canada (1993)
- Julie Bishop, Former Minister for Foreign Affairs of Australia (2013–2018)
- W. Michael Blumenthal, United States Secretary of the Treasury (1977–79)
- Børge Brende, former foreign minister of Norway (2013–2017)
- Micheline Calmy-Rey, former president and foreign minister of Switzerland
- Bob Carr, former Minister for Foreign Affairs of Australia (2012–13)
- Bill Clinton, former president of the United States (1993–2001)
- Hillary Clinton, 2016 Democratic presidential candidate, former Secretary of State of the United States, former United States Senator for New York, former First Lady of the United States (1993–2001)
- Joko Widodo, president of Indonesia (2014–2024)
- Pascal Couchepin, former president of the Swiss Confederation (2007, 2011); former head of the Federal Department of Foreign Affairs of Switzerland (2003–11)
- Stuart Eizenstat, former United States Ambassador to the European Union (1993–96)
- Craig Emerson, former Minister for Trade and Competitiveness of Australia (2010–13)
- Michael Froman, United States Trade Representative (2013–present)
- Paul Gallagher, Secretary for Relations with States (Vatican City foreign secretary) (2014–present)
- Timothy Geithner, United States Secretary of the Treasury (2009–13)
- Vidar Helgesen, Minister of Climate and the Environment of Norway (2015–present); former Minister for EEA Affairs and EU Relations and Chief of Staff of the Prime Minister's Office of Norway
- Lieutenant General Ben Hodges, acting commanding general, United States Army Europe
- Wesley Clark, former Supreme Allied Commander of NATO (1996–99)
- Joseph Ralston, former Supreme Allied Commander of NATO (2000–03)
- James Jones, former Supreme Allied Commander of NATO (2003–2006)
- James Stavridis, former Supreme Allied Commander of NATO (2009–13)
- John Kerry, United States Secretary of State (2013–2017) and 2004 Democratic presidential nominee
- John Key, Former Prime Minister of New Zealand (2008–2016)
- Jack Lew, United States Secretary of the Treasury (2013–2017)
- John McCain, former United States senator (1987–2018); Republican presidential nominee in 2008
- Richard Morningstar, former United States Ambassador to the European Union (1999–2001)
- Mohamed Nasheed, former president of the Maldives (2008–12)
- Paul H. O'Neill, United States Secretary of the Treasury (2001–02)
- Barack Obama, president of the United States (2009–2017)
- Henry Paulson, United States Secretary of the Treasury (2006–09)
- David Petraeus, former director of the Central Intelligence Agency (2011–12), former commander of the International Security Assistance Force and former commander of United States Central Command
- Edi Rama, prime minister of Albania (2013–present)
- Robert Reich, United States Secretary of Labor (1993–1997)
- Robert Rubin, United States Secretary of the Treasury (1995–99)
- Bernie Sanders, 2016 Democratic presidential candidate and United States Senator from Vermont
- George P. Shultz, United States Secretary of the Treasury (1972–74)
- John W. Snow, United States Secretary of the Treasury (2003–06)
- Erna Solberg, prime minister of Norway (2013–present)
- Lawrence Summers, United States Secretary of the Treasury (1999–2001)
- Wayne Swan, former deputy prime minister of Australia (2010–13)
- Malcolm Turnbull, former prime minister of Australia (2015–2018)
- Sheikh Hasina, prime minister of Bangladesh (1996–2001, 2009–2024)
- Xi Jinping, General Secretary of the Chinese Communist Party and President of China
- Narendra Modi, prime minister of India
- Stephen Harper, former prime minister of Canada (2006–2015)

=== International organisations ===
- European Central Bank
- Group of Seven (G7)
- G-20 major economies
- World Trade Organization (WTO)
- World Bank
- International Monetary Fund
- North Atlantic Treaty Organization (NATO)
- Organisation for Economic Co-operation and Development
- World Wide Fund for Nature (WWF)
- Unite the Union (British and Irish)

=== Businesses ===
- Airbus Group, aerospace manufacturer
- Asda, retailer
- BAE Systems, defence contractor
- BlackRock, global investment firm
- BMW, car manufacturer
- Bombardier, aerospace company
- BT Group, telecommunications
- Caterpillar Inc., manufacturing company
- Clifford Chance, multinational law firm
- Diageo, alcoholic beverages
- EasyJet, airline
- Ford of Britain, car manufacturer
- Fujitsu, information technology
- Gatwick Airport
- Heathrow Airport Holdings
- Hewlett-Packard Enterprise, information technology
- IBM, information technology
- JPMorgan, bank
- Kingfisher plc, multinational retailer owning the brands B&Q, Castorama, Brico Dépôt and Screwfix
- Marks & Spencer, retailer
- Mars, Incorporated, food manufacturer
- Microsoft, information technology
- Moy Park, food manufacturer
- Rio Tinto, mining
- Rolls-Royce Motor Cars, car manufacturer
- Ryanair, airline
- Shell, oil company
- Toyota, car manufacturer
- TransferWise, money transfer company
- Vauxhall Motors, car manufacturer
- Whitbread, leisure conglomerate

=== Newspapers and magazines ===
==== British newspapers and magazines ====
- Belfast Telegraph
- Birmingham Mail
- British Medical Journal
- Daily Mirror
- Daily Record
- The Economist
- Farmers Weekly
- Financial Times
- The Guardian
- The Herald
- The Independent
- The Irish News
- The Journal
- The Lancet
- Liverpool Echo
- London Evening Standard
- The Mail on Sunday
- Manchester Evening News
- The National
- Nature
- New Statesman
- The Observer
- The Scotsman
- Sunday Herald
- Sunday Mail
- Sunday Mirror
- Sunday People
- The Times
- The Voice
- Western Mail

==== Foreign newspapers and magazines ====
- Algemeen Dagblad (Netherlands)
- Der Spiegel (Germany)
- Il Sole 24 Ore (Italy)
- Irish Independent (Ireland)
- Le Soir (Belgium)

=== Local government authorities ===
- Birmingham City Council (Labour controlled)
- Bristol City Council (Labour controlled)
- Camden London Borough Council (Labour controlled)
- Cardiff City Council (Labour controlled)
- City of London Corporation (Independent control)
- Glasgow City Council (Labour controlled)
- Leeds City Council (Labour controlled)
- Leicester City Council (Labour controlled)
- Liverpool City Council (Labour controlled)
- London Assembly (no overall control)
- Manchester City Council (Labour controlled)
- Milton Keynes Council (no overall control)
- Newcastle City Council (Labour controlled)
- Nottingham City Council (Labour controlled)
- Redbridge London Borough Council (Labour controlled)
- Sheffield City Council (Labour controlled)

=== Organisations ===
- Chatham House, the Royal Institute of International Affairs
- Church in Wales
- Church of Scotland
- Commission of the Bishops' Conferences of the European Community
- Confederation of British Industry
- Cornish Pasty Association
- European Round Table of Industrialists
- Friends of the Earth
- Genetic Alliance UK
- Institute for Fiscal Studies
- Museums Association
- National Campaign Against Fees and Cuts
- National Farmers' Union
- National Outsourcing Association
- All 20 teams of the Premier League
- Quaker Council for European Affairs
- Royal College of Midwives
- Royal Society for the Protection of Birds
- Russell Group
- Society of Motor Manufacturers and Traders
- Universities UK

==== Trade unions ====
The Trades Union Congress (TUC), representing 52 British trade unions, endorsed Britain remaining in the EU. All but a few of its member unions were expected to urge voters to stay in the EU.

- Trades Union Congress
- Broadcasting, Entertainment, Cinematograph and Theatre Union
- Communication Workers Union
- Community
- Equity
- Fire Brigades Union
- GMB
- Musicians' Union
- Transport Salaried Staffs' Association
- Union of Construction, Allied Trades and Technicians
- Union of Shop, Distributive and Allied Workers
- UNISON
- Unite

==== Other organisations ====
- Britain Stronger in Europe
- European Movement UK
- Labour in for Britain
- Momentum, left wing group which supports Jeremy Corbyn's leadership of the Labour party

=== Noted individuals ===
- Chris Addison, comedian, actor, and writer
- Ben Ainslie, competitive sailor
- Kyran Bracken, England rugby player and Rugby World Cup winner
- Yasmin Alibhai-Brown, journalist and author
- Lily Allen, musician
- Alt-J, indie rock band
- Michael Arthur, provost and president of University College London
- Rick Astley, musician
- Sir Brendan Barber, chair of the Advisory, Conciliation and Arbitration Service (ACAS) Council, former general secretary of the Trades Union Congress
- John Barnes, former professional footballer
- Sir Patrick Bateson, scientist and president of the Zoological Society of London
- David Beckham, former professional footballer
- Victoria Beckham, musician, member of the Spice Girls
- Tim Berners-Lee, inventor of the World Wide Web
- Gurpreet Kaur Bhatti, writer
- Billy Bragg, singer-songwriter and left-wing activist
- Katy Brand, actress and comedian
- Michael Burleigh, historian
- Tanya Burr, YouTube personality, author
- Professor Bruce Campbell, non-executive director at the Medicines and Healthcare products Regulatory Agency
- Noam Chomsky, intellectual and academic at MIT
- Jeremy Clarkson, television personality
- Tim Commerford, former Rage Against the Machine bassist
- Paul Cook, drummer, Sex Pistols
- Simon Cowell, senior English reality television judge, entrepreneur, philanthropist, film, record, and television producer
- Daniel Craig, actor
- Garth Crooks, former professional footballer
- Lawrence Dallaglio, England rugby player and Rugby World Cup winner
- Matt Damon, actor
- Ara Darzi, Baron Darzi, FRS, professor of surgery
- Cara Delevingne, fashion model and actress
- Joe Dempsie, actor
- Sir Ian Diamond, principal and vice-chancellor of the University of Aberdeen
- Geoff Downes, musician, co-founded The Buggles
- Michael Eavis, dairy farmer and the founder of the Glastonbury Festival
- Idris Elba, actor, musician, and DJ
- Tracey Emin, artist and nominee of the Turner Prize
- Neil Faulkner, historian and archaeologist
- Rio Ferdinand, footballer
- Stephanie Flanders, J.P. Morgan Asset Management market strategist, former BBC economics editor
- Flyte, alternative pop band
- Gavin Free, YouTuber and cinematographer
- Lawrence Freedman, emeritus professor of War Studies at King's College London
- Rebecca Front, actress
- Nick Frost, actor, comedian, and writer
- Peter Gabriel, musician
- Bob Geldof, musician and campaigner
- Bobby George, darts player
- Ben Goldacre, physician, academic and science writer
- Sir Muir Gray, Chief Knowledge Officer to the National Health Service
- Germaine Greer, writer
- Bear Grylls, adventurer
- Steve Hackett, musician, former guitarist in Genesis
- Sheila Hancock, actress and author
- Eva Herzigová, supermodel
- Eliot Higgins, blogger and founder of Bellingcat
- Sheila Hollins, Baroness Hollins, president of the College of Occupational Therapists and former president of the British Medical Association
- Armando Iannucci, satirist
- Eric Idle, comedian, actor, author, and musician
- Maro Itoje, England rugby player
- Sir Elton John, musician
- Rachel Johnson, journalist and writer
- Simon Johnson, former chief economist of the International Monetary Fund
- Owen Jones, writer, columnist and political activist
- Garry Kasparov, chess grandmaster and political activist
- Max Keiser, economist and co-host of the Russia Today show Keiser Report
- Peter Kendall, farmer and former president of the National Farmers' Union
- Paul Krugman, economist
- Nish Kumar, comedian
- Sir Andrew Large, former deputy governor of the Bank of England (2002–2006)
- Gary Lineker, retired professional footballer and sports presenter
- John Lydon (Johnny Rotten), singer, Sex Pistols and Public Image Ltd., though he later expressed support for Brexit
- Houzan Mahmoud, Kurdish activist
- Michael Mansfield, barrister and political activist
- Chris Martin, musician, member of Coldplay
- Paul Mason, journalist and broadcaster
- James May, television personality
- Sylvester McCoy, actor, former Doctor Who
- Rachel McFarlane, singer
- Sir Ian McKellen, actor
- Tim Minchin, Australian comedian, musician, and actor
- David Mitchell, comedian, actor, and writer
- Brian Moore, rugby player
- Michael Moore, documentary filmmaker
- Michael Morpurgo, author
- Ferdinand Mount, former head of the Number 10 Policy Unit for Margaret Thatcher (1980–1983)
- Elaine Murphy, Baroness Murphy, professor of psychiatry
- Richard Murphy, economist and tax campaigner
- Liam Neeson, actor
- David Nicoholson, former chief executive of NHS England
- Sir Paul Nurse, scientist and Nobel laureate
- James O'Brien, LBC radio host
- Frances O'Grady, general secretary of the Trade Unions Congress
- Jamie Oliver, celebrity chef
- John Oliver, comedian, political commentator and television host
- Ann Pettifor, economist
- Thomas Piketty, economist
- Clémence Poésy, actress and fashion model
- Daniel Portman, actor
- Vicky Pryce, economist
- Paula Radcliffe, long-distance runner
- Sir Simon Rattle, conductor
- Sigrid Rausing, philanthropist
- Sir Michael Rawlins, chair of the Medicines and Healthcare products Regulatory Agency
- Dani Rodrik, economics professor at Harvard
- Gruff Rhys, musician
- J.K. Rowling, author of the Harry Potter series
- Simon Schama, historian
- Will Self, novelist and journalist
- Amartya Sen, economist and philosopher
- The Most Revd and Rt Hon Dr John Sentamu, archbishop of York
- Sandie Shaw, Eurovision Song Contest winner
- Rt Rev Alan Smith, bishop of St Albans and Lord Spiritual
- Delia Smith, cook and television presenter
- Kate Smurthwaite, comedian
- Dan Snow, television presenter
- Simon Stevens, chief executive of NHS England
- Sir Tom Stoppard, play-writer
- Dame Janet Suzman, actress, also supported in the 1975 referendum
- Martin Temple, chairman of the Design Council
- Neil Tennant, musician
- Emma Thompson, actress
- Sir Richard Thompson, former president of the Royal College of Physicians
- Wolfgang Tillmans, artist, photographer, winner of the 2000 Turner Prize
- Helen Tse, author and chef
- Steve Turner, trade unionist
- Björn Ulvaeus, musical producer, singer and songwriter
- Manjinder Virk, actress and filmmaker
- Hibo Wardere, anti-female genital mutilation campaigner
- Robert Webb, comedian, actor, and writer
- Justin Welby, archbishop of Canterbury
- Florence Welch, lead singer, Florence + The Machine
- Sir Simon Wessely, president of the Royal College of Psychiatrists
- Zoe Williams, journalist and writer
- Robert Winston, Baron Winston, scientist

==== Healthcare professionals letter ====
In a letter to The Times, around 200 healthcare professionals defended the EU as an overall benefit to UK public health, the NHS and health research. Sections from the letter stated "As health professionals and researchers we write to highlight the valuable benefits of continued EU membership to the NHS, medical innovation and UK public health". "We have made enormous progress over decades in international health research, health services innovation and public health. Much has been built around shared policies and capacity across the EU". "EU trade deals will not privatise the NHS as the EU negotiating position now contains clear safeguards. Decisions on NHS privatisation are in UK government hands alone. EU immigration is a net benefit to our NHS in terms of finances, staffing and exchanges". "Finally, leaving the EU would not provide a financial windfall for the NHS". Signatories included:

- Sir George Alberti, visiting professor, King's College, London
- Lord Alderdice FRCPsych, senior research fellow, Harris Manchester College, University of Oxford, Oxford
- Dame Sue Bailey, past president, Royal College of Psychiatrists
- Sir Tom Blundell, president of Science Council; co-founder, Astex Therapeutics, Cambridge
- Sir Harry Burns, professor of Global Public Health, University of Strathclyde
- Sir Iain Chalmers, coordinator, James Lind Initiative, Oxford
- Sir Cyril Chantler, former chairman of The King's Fund and the UCL Partners academic health science network, London
- Professor Dame Jill Macleod Clark, professor of Nursing, University of Southampton
- Lord Nigel Crisp, former chief executive, NHS, London
- Lord Ara Darzi OM, Paul Hamlyn Professor of Surgery, Imperial College
- Sir Sam Everington, general practitioner, London
- Dr Andy Flynn, general practitioner, London
- Sir Ian Gilmore, professor, University of Liverpool
- Sir Andy Haines, former dean, London School of Hygiene & Tropical Medicine
- Baroness Sheila Hollins, former president, Royal College of Psychiatrists, London
- Dr Carolina Lopez, consultant radiologist, Bedford Hospital NHS Trust
- Dr Christopher A Birt, honorary clinical senior lecturer in Public Health, University of Liverpool
- Dr Clare Gerada MBE, former chair, Royal College of General Practitioners, London
- Dr David L Cohen, consultant physician, Northwood
- Dr David Nicholl, clinical lead for Neurology & Neurophysiology (writing in a personal capacity), Sandwell & West Birmingham NHS Trust, Birmingham
- Dr David Wrigley, GP, Carnforth, Lancashire
- Dr Eric Watts, consultant physician (Retd), Brentwood
- Dr Geeta Nargund, medical director, Create Fertility, London
- Dr George Pollock, chairman, Education and Training Committee, Birmingham Medical Institute
- Dr Laura Sellers, clinical fellow in oncology, London
- Dr Leila Lessof OBE, former director of Public Health, London
- Dr Linda Papadopoulos, psychologist, London
- Dr Lynne Jones OBE, FRCPsych., consultant child and adolescent psychiatrist, Cornwall Partnership NHS Foundation Trust
- Dr Maria Elena Farrugia, consultant neurologist, Greater Glasgow & Clyde
- Dr Martin Yuille, reader, University of Manchester
- Dr Maxwell S. Damian, consultant neurologist, Cambridge
- Dr Peter Carter, former CEO, Royal College of Nursing
- Dr Richard Horton, editor-in-chief, The Lancet, Elsevier
- Dr Roberta Jacobson OBE, honorary senior lecturer, Institute of Health Equity, London
- Dr S Vittal Katikireddi, senior clinical research fellow, University of Glasgow
- Dr Sarah Anderson, general practitioner, London
- Dr Suzy Lishman, president, The Royal College of Pathologists
- Dr Tom Steele, junior doctor, Aintree University Hospital
- Dr Tony Jewell, former chief medical officer, Wales, Cardiff
- Dr Verma Amar Nath, retired general medical practitioner (NHS), Birmingham
- Prof Alison Woollard, associate professor, University of Oxford
- Professor Alastair H Leyland, professor of Population Health Statistics, University of Glasgow
- Professor Allan H Young, director, Centre for Affective Disorders, King's College London
- Professor Ann Louise Kinmonth CBE, emeritus professor of General practice, University of Cambridge
- Professor Anne Marie Rafferty CBE, professor of Nursing Policy, King's College London
- Professor David Edwards FMedSci, professor of Paediatrics and Neonatal Medicine, director, Centre for the Developing Brain, King's College, London
- Professor David Mabey FMedSci, professor of Communicable Diseases, London School of Hygiene and Tropical Medicine
- Professor David Wood, professor of Cardiology, Imperial College London
- Professor Debbie A Lawlor, professor of Epidemiology, University of Bristol, Bristol
- Professor Derek Cook, professor of Epidemiology, St George's University of London
- Professor Dorothy Bishop FRS, FBA, FMedSci, professor of Developmental Neuropsychology, University of Oxford
- Professor Eileen Joyce, professor of Neuropsychiatry, University College London
- Professor Ewan Birney, director, European Molecular Biology Laboratory
- Professor George Davey Smith, professor of Clinical Epidemiology, University of Bristol
- Professor Humphrey Hodgson FMed Sci, emeritus professor of Medicine, UCL
- Professor J Robert Sneyd, dean and professor of Anaesthesia, Peninsula Schools of Medicine and Dentistry
- Professor James Steele CBE, professor of Restorative Dentistry and head of school, Newcastle University
- Professor Jan Scott, professor of Psychological Medicine, University of Newcastle
- Professor Jan van der Meulen, professor of Clinical Epidemiology, London School of Hygiene & Tropical Medicine
- Professor Jane Salvage, nursing consultant, Lewes
- Professor John Ashton CBE, president, Faculty of Public Health
- Professor John Malcolm Harrington, emeritus professor of Occupational Medicine, Budleigh Salterton
- Professor John Middleton, University of Wolverhampton, Wolverhampton
- Professor John Williams CBE, professor of Health Services Research, Swansea University Medical School
- Professor Jonathan Weber, director, imperial College Academic Health Science Centre, Imperial College London
- Professor Kate Bushby, professor of Neuromuscular Genetics, Newcastle University
- Professor KK Cheng, director, Institute of Applied Health Research, University of Birmingham
- Professor Liam Smeeth, senior clinical research fellow, London School of Hygiene and Tropical Medicine
- Professor Lindsey Davies CBE, former president, UK Faculty of Public Health, London
- Professor Mark S Gilthorpe, professor of Statistical Epidemiology, University of Leeds
- Professor Martin Bobak, professor of Epidemiology, University College London
- Professor Martin White, programme leader, Food Behaviours and Public Health, University of Cambridge
- Professor Mike Pringle, former President, Royal College of General Practitioners, Retired GP
- Professor Peter Kopelman, emeritus professor of Medicine (formerly Principal), St George's, University of London
- Professor Peter Openshaw, professor of Experimental Medicine, Imperial College London
- Professor Peter Whincup, professor of Epidemiology, St George's, University of London
- Professor Ray Powles CBE, head, Haemato-oncology, Cancer Centre London
- Professor Raymond Agius, professor of Occupational and Environmental Medicine, The University of Manchester
- Professor Rita Horvath, professor of Neurogenetics, Newcastle University
- Professor Rob Poole, professor of Social Psychiatry, Bangor University
- Professor Rod Griffiths CBE, past president, Faculty of Public Health, London
- Professor Rod Hay, professor of Cutaneous Infection, Kings College NHS Trust London
- Professor Sir John Burn, professor of Clinical Genetics, Newcastle University
- Professor Sir Munir Pirmohamed, David Weatherall Chair of Medicine and Consultant Physician, University of Liverpool
- Professor Stephanie Amiel, professor of Diabetic Medicine, King's College London
- Professor Stephen Keevil, professor of Medical Physics, King's College London
- Professor Stuart Carney, dean of Medical Education, King's College London
- Professor Tamara Hervey, Jean Monnet Professor of European Law, University of Sheffield
- Professor Tim Helliwell, vice president for Learning, Royal College of Pathologists, Liverpool
- Professor Trevor Powles CBE, head of Breast Cancer Cancer Centre, London
- Professor Trisha Greenhalgh OBE, professor of Primary Care Health Sciences, University of Oxford
- Patrick Moore, primary care practice pharmacist, Belfast
- Alexandra Johnson, CEO of JoiningJack, Joining Jack, Wigan
- Louise Johnson, Well North executive co-ordinator, The University of Manchester
- Baroness Elaine Murphy FRCPsych, professor of Psychiatry, London
- Sir Robin Murray, professor of Psychiatric Research, King's College, London
- Sir David Nicholson, former chief executive, NHS
- Sir Keith Peters, emeritus regius professor of Physic University of Cambridge, president of Academy of Medical Sciences 2002–2006, Cambridge
- Sir Norman Williams, former president, Royal College of Surgeons
- Sir Eric Thomas, former vice-chancellor, University of Bristol
- Sir Richard Thompson, immediate past president, Royal College of Physicians, London
- Professor Dame Janet Thornton, senior scientist, European Bioinformatics Institute European Molecular Biology Laboratory
- Professor Dame Til Wykes, professor and vice dean, King's College London

==== Royal Society letter ====
Led by Professor Stephen Hawking, more than 150 notable academics, all Fellows of the Royal Society, signed a letter to The Times newspaper setting out their position on the European Union that leaving the bloc would damage science and research. They included:

- Michael Akam, FRS, zoologist
- Ali Alavi, FRS, professor of Theoretical Chemistry
- Ross Anderson, FRS, professor of Security Engineering
- Shankar Balasubramanian, FRS, professor of Medicinal Chemistry
- Andrew Balmford, FRS, professor of Conservation Science
- David Barford, FRS, professor of Molecular Biology
- John D. Barrow, FRS, professor of Mathematical Sciences
- Michael Bate, FRS, zoologist
- Sir David Baulcombe, scientist
- Sir Harshad Badeshia, FRS, professor of Metallurgy
- Michael Bickle, FRS, professor of Geophysics, Geodynamics and Tectonics
- Mariann Bienz, FRS, molecular biologist
- Sir Tom Blundell, scientist and president of the Science Council
- Martin Bobrow, FRS, geneticist
- Alexander Boksenberg, scientist
- William Bonfield, scientist
- Paul Brakefield, scientist and president of the Linnean Society of London
- Andrea Brand, FRS, professor of Molecular Biology
- Kenneth Bray, FRS, engineer
- Barbara Bretscher, FRS, biological scientist
- Mark S. Bretscher, FRS, biologist
- Lord Alec Broers, Baron Broers, engineer and former vice-chancellor of the University of Cambridge
- L. Michael Brown, FRS, material scientist
- Malcolm Burrows, FRS, zoologist
- Chris Calladine, FRS, engineer
- Sir Roy Yorke Calne, surgeon
- Michael Cates, FRS, physicist
- Anthony Cheetham, FRS, materials scientist
- Jennifer A. Clack, FRS, palaeontologist
- Jane Clarke, FRS, professor of Molecular Biophysics
- Nicola Clayton, FRS, professor of Comparative Cognition
- Tim Clutton-Brock, FRS, zoologist
- John Coates, FRS, mathematician
- Andrew Crawford, FRS, neuroscientist
- Jon Crowcroft, FRS, professor of Communications Systems
- Sir Partha Dasgupta, economist
- John Davidson, FRS, chemical engineer
- Nicholas Davies, FRS, professor of Behavioural Ecology
- Anthony Dickinson, FRS, neuroscientist
- Christopher Dobson, FRS, chemist
- Dame Athene Donald, scientist
- George Efstathiou, FRS, professor of Astrophysics
- Barry Everitt, FRS, professor of Behavioral Neuroscience
- Andrew Fabian, FRS, astronomer and astrophysicist
- Douglas Fearon, FRS, professor of Immunology
- Malcolm Ferguson-Smith, FRS, geneticist
- Sir Alan Fersht, scientist
- Norman Fleck, FRS, director of the Cambridge Centre for Micromechanics
- Ian Fleming, FRS, chemist
- Derek Fray, FRS, material scientist
- Ray Freeman, FRS, chemist
- Daan Frenkel, FRS, computational physicist
- Sir Richard Friend, Cavendish Professor of Physics
- Zoubin Ghahramani, FRS, professor of Information Engineering
- Gary Gibbons, FRS, theoretical physicist
- Gerry Gilmore, FRS, professor of Experimental Philosophy
- Keith Glover, FRS, electrical engineer
- Michel Goedert, FRS, neuroscientist
- Raymond E. Goldstein, FRS, professor of Complex Physical Systems
- Michael Gordon, FRS, computer scientist
- Sir Timothy Gowers, mathematician, awarded the Fields Medal
- Michael Green, scientist and former Lucasian Professor of Mathematics
- Clare Grey, FRS, chemist
- Gillian M. Griffiths, FRS, professor of Cell Biology and Immunology
- Geoffrey Grimmett, FRS, master of Downing College, Cambridge
- Jean-Pierre Hansen, FRS, chemist
- William Harris, FRS, professor of Anatomy
- Stephen Hawking, scientist and former Lucasian Professor of Mathematics
- Sir Brian Heap, FRS, biologist
- Volker Heine, FRS, physicist
- Richard Henderson, FRS, molecular biologist and biophysicist
- Richard Hills, FRS, radio astronomer
- John Hinch, FRS, professor of Fluid Dynamics
- Christine Holt, FRS, developmental neuroscientist
- Andy Hopper, FRS, professor of Computer Technology
- Archie Howie, scientist
- Sir Colin Humphreys, FRS, physicist
- Christopher Hunter, FRS, chemist
- Herbert Huppert, FRS, geophysicist
- Richard Jackson, FRS, biochemist
- Steve Jackson, FRS, professor of Biology
- Martin H Johnson, FRS, emeritus professor of Reproductive Sciences
- Brian Josephson, scientist and Nobel laureate
- Frank Kelly, FRS, master of Christ's College, Cambridge
- Robert C. Kennicutt, Jr, FRS, Plumian Professor of Astronomy
- Eric Keverne, FRS, behavioural neuroscientist
- David Klenerman, FRS, professor of Biophysical Chemistry
- Sir Aaron Klug, FRS, chemist and biophysicist, winner of the 1982 Nobel Prize in Chemistry
- Tony Kouzarides, FRS, professor of Cancer Biology
- Sir Peter Lachmann, immunologist
- Ronald Laskey, FRS, cell biologist and cancer researcher
- Peter Lawrence, FRS, developmental biologist
- Malcolm Longair, physicist
- Ruth Lynden-Bell, chemist
- Sir David J. C. MacKay, Regius Professor of Engineering, Cambridge
- Robert Mair, Baron Mair, head of Civil and Environmental Engineering at the University of Cambridge
- Nicholas Manton, FRS, professor of Mathematical Physics
- Sir John Meurig Thomas, chemist
- Paul Midgley, FRS, professor of Materials Science
- Keith Moffatt, FRS, mathematician
- Sir Stephen O'Rahilly, FRS, professor of Clinical Biochemistry and Medicine
- KJ Patel, FRS, molecular biologist
- Karalyn Patterson, FRS, psychologist
- Timothy Pedley, FRS, mathematician
- Sir Hugh Pelham, cell biologist
- Sir Bruce Ponder, cancer researcher
- Michael Proctor, FRS, professor of Astrophysical Fluid Dynamics
- John Pyle, FRS, director of the Centre for Atmospheric Science
- Randy J. Read, FRS, professor of Protein Crystallography
- Martin Rees, Baron Rees, Astronomer Royal and former president of the Royal Society
- Sir Trevor W. Robbins, scientist and former president of the British Neuroscience Association
- David Ron, FRS, professor of Cellular Pathophysiology
- Eckhard K.H Salje, FRS, professor of Mineralogy and Petrology
- Jeremy K. M. Sanders, FRS, professor of Chemistry
- Pat Simpson, FRS, professor of Comparative Embryology
- Henning Sirringhaus, FRS, professor of Electron Device Physics
- Geoffrey L. Smith, FRS, virologist
- Maria Grazia Spillantini, FRS, professor of Molecular Neurology
- Sir Peter Swinnerton-Dyer, mathematician
- Simon Tavaré, FRS, professor of Cancer Research
- John C Taylor, FRS, mathematical physicist
- Dame Jean Thomas, scientist and president of the Royal Society of Biology
- Roger Thomas, FRS, physiologist
- John Todd, FRS, professor of Medical Genetics
- Paul Townsend, FRS, professor of Theoretical Physics
- Sir John E. Walker, scientist and Nobel laureate
- Bryan Webber, FRS, physicist
- Nigel Weiss, FRS, astronomer and mathematician
- Sir Mark Welland, FRS, professor of Nanotechnology
- Robert White, FRS, professor of Geophysics
- Sir Gregory Winter, FRS, biochemist
- Eric Wolff, FRS, climatologist
- Daniel Wolpert, FRS, medical doctor, neuroscientist and engineer

==== University leaders letter ====
Over 100 UK university leaders signed an open letter to The Sunday Times supporting UK membership of the EU. They stated that "Inside the EU, we are better able to collaborate with partners from across Europe to carry out cutting edge research, from medical and healthcare advances, to new materials, products and services. In the EU, the UK is also a more attractive destination for global talent, ensuring that our students are taught by the best minds from across Europe. This has a direct impact on our economy, driving growth, generating jobs and ultimately improving people's lives". Signatories included:

- Professor Dame Julia Goodfellow, president, Universities UK; vice-chancellor, University of Kent
- Professor Janet Beer, vice-president, Universities UK; vice-chancellor, University of Liverpool
- Professor Colin Riordan, vice-president, Universities UK; vice-chancellor, Cardiff University
- Professor Simon Gaskell, treasurer, Universities UK; president and principal, Queen Mary University of London
- Professor Robert J. Allison, vice-chancellor, Loughborough University
- Baroness Valerie Amos, director, SOAS
- Professor Michael Arthur, president and provost, UCL
- Sir David Bell, vice-chancellor, University of Reading
- Professor Sir Leszek Borysiewicz, vice-chancellor, University of Cambridge
- Professor Hugh Brady, vice-chancellor, University of Bristol
- Professor Chris Brink, vice-chancellor, Newcastle University
- Baroness Brown of Cambridge, vice-chancellor, Aston University
- Professor Sir Keith Burnett, vice-chancellor, University of Sheffield
- Professor Ed Byrne, principal and president, King's College London
- Professor Craig Calhoun, director and president, London School of Economics and Political Science
- Nigel Carrington, vice-chancellor, University of the Arts London
- Professor John Cater, vice-chancellor, Edge Hill University
- Professor Stuart Corbridge, vice-chancellor, Durham University
- Professor Bob Cryan CBE, vice-chancellor, University of Huddersfield
- Professor Sir Paul Curran, vice-chancellor, City University London
- Professor Sir Ian Diamond, principal and vice-chancellor, University of Aberdeen
- Professor Sir David Eastwood, vice-chancellor, University of Birmingham
- Professor Michael Farthing, vice-chancellor, University of Sussex
- Professor Anthony Forster, vice-chancellor, University of Essex
- Professor Alice Gast, president, Imperial College London
- Professor Pamela Gillies CBE, vice-chancellor, Glasgow Caledonian University
- Professor Sir David Greenaway, vice-chancellor, University of Nottingham
- Professor Michael Gunn, vice-chancellor, Staffordshire University
- Professor Gavin Henderson CBE, principal, The Royal Central School of Speech and Drama
- Peter Horrocks CBE, vice-chancellor, The Open University
- Professor John Hughes, vice-chancellor, Bangor University
- Professor Chris Husbands, vice-chancellor, Sheffield Hallam University
- Professor Patrick Johnston, vice-chancellor, Queen's University Belfast
- Sir Alan Langlands, vice-chancellor, University of Leeds
- Professor Patrick Loughrey, warden, Goldsmiths, University of London
- Professor Helen Marshall, vice-chancellor, University of Salford
- Professor Gerry McCormac, vice-chancellor, University of Stirling
- Professor Trevor McMillan, vice-chancellor, Keele University
- Professor Kathryn Mitchell, vice-chancellor, University of Derby
- Professor Anton Muscatelli, vice-chancellor, University of Glasgow
- Professor Paddy Nixon, vice-chancellor, University of Ulster
- Professor Andrea Nolan OBE, vice-chancellor, Edinburgh Napier University
- Professor Timothy O'Shea, vice-chancellor, University of Edinburgh
- Professor Edward Peck, vice-chancellor, Nottingham Trent University
- Professor Nick Petford, vice-v, University of Northampton
- Professor David Phoenix, vice-chancellor, London South Bank University
- Professor Gerald Pillay, vice-chancellor, Liverpool Hope University
- Professor Peter Piot, director, London School of Hygiene & Tropical Medicine
- Professor Calie Pistorius, vice-chancellor, University of Hull
- Professor Malcolm Press, vice-chancellor, Manchester Metropolitan University
- Bill Rammell, vice-chancellor, University of Bedfordshire
- Professor Stuart Reid, principal, The Royal Veterinary College
- Professor David Richardson, vice-chancellor, University of East Anglia
- Professor Louise Richardson, vice-chancellor, University of Oxford
- Sir Anthony Seldon, vice-chancellor, University of Buckingham
- Professor Dominic Shellard, vice-chancellor, De Montfort University
- Professor Christina Slade, vice-chancellor, Bath Spa University
- Professor Sir Adrian Smith, vice-chancellor, University of London
- Professor Sir Christopher Snowden, vice-chancellor, University of Southampton
- Professor Sir Steve Smith, vice-chancellor, University of Exeter
- Professor Mike Thomas, vice-chancellor, University of Central Lancashire
- Dr Paul Thompson, rector, Royal College of Art
- Professor Graham Upton, vice-chancellor, Glyndwr University
- Professor Andrew Wathey, vice-chancellor, University of Northumbria
- Professor Nigel Weatherill, vice-chancellor, Liverpool John Moores University
- Professor Steven West, vice-chancellor, University of the West of England
- Professor Julius Weinberg, vice-chancellor, Kingston University
- Professor Richard Williams OBE, vice-chancellor, Heriot-Watt University

==== Creative Industries letter ====
Almost 300 of the world's biggest creative industries names signed a letter to support keeping Britain in the EU, including (but not limited to) the names listed below. A Creative Industries Federation survey also revealed that 96% of its members supported remaining in the EU. The letter stated that "Britain is not just stronger in Europe, it is more imaginative and more creative, and our global creative success would be severely weakened by walking away". Signatories included:

- Aaron Taylor-Johnson, actor
- Abi Morgan, writer
- Adam Broomberg and Oliver Chanarin, artists
- Adrian Scarborough, actor
- Akram Khan, dancer, choreographer
- Alex Kapranos, musician, Franz Ferdinand
- Alexandra Shulman OBE, editor-in-chief, British Vogue
- Alfonso Cuarón, director, screenwriter, producer
- Alistair Spalding CBE, artistic director and chief executive of Sadler's Wells
- Allie Esiri, poetry anthologist, writer
- Alt-J (Gus Unger-Hamilton, Joe Newman, Thom Green), musicians
- Amanda Levete, architect
- Amanda Nevill, CEO, The British Film Institute
- Amir Amor (Rudimental), musician
- Andrew Kötting, artist
- Andy Harries, producer / chief executive, Left Bank Pictures
- Anna Maxwell Martin, actor
- Annoushka Ducas MBE, jewellery designer and entrepreneur
- Anoushka Shankar, musician
- Antonia Campbell-Hughes, actor
- Arlene Phillips CBE, choreographer
- Asif Kapadia, filmmaker
- Baroness Oona King, Channel 4 Diversity Executive
- Bella Freud, designer
- Ben Evans, director of the London Design Festival
- Ben Harris, publicist, founder Run Music
- Ben Rivers, artist
- Benedict Cumberbatch CBE, actor
- Benjamin Caron, director
- Bill Nighy, actor
- Bob and Roberta Smith, artists
- Bob Hardy, musician, Franz Ferdinand
- Brian Blessed, actor
- Bryony Gordon, writer
- Carol Ann Duffy, Poet Laureate
- Carrie Cracknell, theatre director
- Charles Finch, CEO, Finch and Partners
- Charles Saumarez Smith, secretary and chief executive of the Royal Academy of Arts
- Charlotte Mendelson, novelist
- Chiwetel Ejiofor CBE, actor
- Chris Dercon, director of Tate Modern
- Cornelia Parker, artist
- Dame Harriet Walter, actor
- Dame Hilary Mary Mantel DBE FRSL, writer
- Dame Kristin Scott Thomas, actress
- Dame Marina Warner, writer
- Dame Pippa Harris DBE, film and TV producer
- Dame Vivienne Westwood DBE, fashion designer and activist
- Daniel Fletcher, menswear designer
- Daniel Rubin, executive chairman, The Dune Group
- Danny Boyle, director
- Dave Haslam, DJ and author
- Dave Price, composer
- David Adjaye, architect
- David Arnold, film composer
- David Batchelor, artist
- David Heyman, producer
- David Joseph CBE, chairman and chief executive of Universal Music UK
- David Lan, artistic director of the Young Vic
- David Morrissey, actor
- David Oyelowo OBE, actor
- David Puttnam, film producer
- David Sproxton CBE, executive chairman, Aardman Animations studio
- David Yates, film director
- Deborah Bull, assistant principal (London) King's College London
- Dominic Cooke CBE, director
- Dominic West, actor
- Douglas Gordon, artist
- Ed Simons, musician
- Eddie Izzard, comedian
- Edie Campbell, model
- Editors, UK musicians
- Edward Hall, artistic director, Hampstead Theatre
- Elizabeth Karlsen, producer and co-founder of Number 9 Films
- Elizabeth Price, artist
- Emily Eavis, co-organiser of the Glastonbury Festival
- Eric Fellner, co-chairman, Working Title Films
- Gail Rebuck, British publisher, Chair of Penguin Random House UK
- Gary Hume, artist
- Gavin Turk, artist
- Geoff Dyer, author
- Geoff Travis, Rough Trade founder and co-managing director Rough Trade Records
- George Longly, artist
- George Want, director
- Glenn Brown, artist
- Greg Hilty, director, Lisson Gallery
- Hannah Pescod, producer and co-founder, Bandstand Productions
- Hans Ulrich Obrist, curator, Artistic Director at the Serpentine Galleries, London
- Heidi Thomas, writer
- Helena Bonham Carter, actor
- Heydon Prowse, satirist
- Hot Chip, musicians
- Howard Davies, director
- Hussein Chalayan, designer
- Iain Archer, producer / songwriter/ artist and visiting Professor, Leeds College of Music
- Ian Livingstone CBE, video games wntrepreneur and author
- Ian McEwan, novelist and screenwriter
- Ilan Eshkeri, composer
- Ilse Crawford, founder and principal of Studioilse
- Imran Amed, founder and CEO, The Business of Fashion
- Jack Thorne, writer
- James Capper, sculptor
- James Daunt, founder, Daunt Books
- James Lingwood, co-director, Artangel
- Jamie Bell, actor
- Jamie Byng, CEO of Canongate Books and founder of Letters Live and World Book Night
- Jamie Lloyd, director and producer, founder of The Jamie Lloyd Company
- Jarvis Cocker, musician & broadcaster
- Jason Watkins, actor
- Jay Jopling, founder of White Cube
- Jefferson Hack, CEO & co-founder, Dazed Media
- Jenny Agutter OBE, actor
- Jeremy Deller, artist
- Jessie Ware, artist
- Jo Brand, comedian
- Joanna Hogg, director
- Joe Robertson, artistic director, Good Chance Theatre
- Joe Wright, director
- John Kampfner, CEO, Creative Industries Federation
- John le Carré, author
- John Madden, director
- John Pawson, designer
- Jolyon Rubinstein, satirist
- Joseph Mount (Metronomy), musician
- Jude Kelly CBE, artistic director, Southbank Centre
- Jude Law, actor
- Juliet Stevenson, actor
- June Sarpong MBE, broadcaster, campaigner
- Kanya King MBE, founder and CEO of the MOBO Organisation
- Kate Mosse, novelist and playwright
- Katharine Hamnett, fashion designer
- Kathy Lette, author
- Katie Mitchell, director
- Katie Moore, actor
- Keira Knightley, actor
- Keith Milow, artist
- Kelly Hoppen MBE, interior designer, author and entrepreneur
- Kevin Macdonald, director
- Koo Jeong A, artist
- Laura Bailey, model, writer, contributing editor at British Vogue
- Laura Wade, playwright
- Laura Wright, singer
- Lee Hall, dramatist
- Louisa Hutton, artist
- Martha Freud, artist
- Martin Parr, photographer/curator
- Mary Swan, artistic director and chief executive, Proteus
- Matthew Herbert, musician
- Meike Ziervogel, publisher at Peirene Press
- Michael Craig-Martin, artist
- Michael Frayn, writer
- Michael Morpurgo, author
- Michael Winterbottom, director
- Mike Leigh OBE, writer and director
- Nicholas Hytner, director
- Nick McCarthy, musician, Franz Ferdinand
- Nick Dear, playwright
- Nicolas Kent, director/producer; former artistic director of the Tricycle Theatre
- Nicole Farhi, sculptor
- Nigel Carrington, vice-chancellor, University of the Arts London
- Nik Powell, producer
- Nitin Sawhney, musician
- Noel Clarke, actor, director, writer
- Ol Parker, screenwriter and director
- Orlando von Einsiedel, director
- Paloma Faith, artist
- Patrick Grant, designer
- Paul Hosking, artist
- Paul Roseby, National Youth Theatre, director
- Paul Thomson, musician, Franz Ferdinand
- Pawel Pawlikowski, director
- Peter Florence MBE, director, Hay Festival
- Peter Morgan, writer
- Peter Rice, sound design
- Peter Strickland, director
- Philip Pullman, writer
- Piers Aggett (Rudimental), musician
- Polly Stenham, writer
- Professor Eyal Weizman, architect and Professor of Spatial and Visual Cultures at Goldsmiths, University of London, and director of the Centre for Research Architecture
- Professor Jonathan Shalit OBE, chairman, ROAR Group
- Rhodri Meilir, actor
- Richard Curtis, writer and director
- Richard Rogers, architect
- Richard Wentworth, artist
- Robert Montgomery, artist and poet
- Ron Arad, designer
- Sabrina Guinness, producer
- Sally Wainwright, writer, director and executive producer
- Sam Taylor-Johnson OBE, filmmaker, artist
- Sam Thorne, director, Nottingham Contemporary
- Samuel West, actor
- Sandi Toksvig OBE, founder of the Women's Equality Party, author, comedian and presenter
- Dr. Sandie Shaw, chair, Featured Artist Coalition
- Sara and Leonie Lowri, The Eggs Collective
- Sarah Solemani, actress and writer
- Saul Dibb, director
- Shirazeh Houshiary, artist
- Simon Patterson, artist
- Simon Stephens, writer
- Sir Anish Kapoor, sculptor
- Sir David Chipperfield CBE, RA RDI RIBA architect
- Sir Derek Jacobi CBE, actor
- Sir John Hurt CBE, actor
- Sir John Sorrell CBE, chairman of Creative Industries Federation
- Sir Matthew Bourne, artistic firector, New Adventures
- Sir Patrick Stewart, actor and activist
- Sir Tom Stoppard OM CBE, playwright and screenwriter
- Sonia Friedman, producer
- Sophie Fiennes, director, producer
- Sophie Okonedo, actor
- Stephen Daldry CBE, director and producer
- Stephen Frears, director
- Stephen Woolley, producer, director
- Steve Coogan, actor, producer, writer
- Steve McQueen, director
- Tacita Dean, artist
- Thandiwe Newton, actress
- Thea Sharrock, director
- Thomas Heatherwick, designer
- Tim Bevan, co-chairman, Working Title Films
- Tim Pigott-Smith, actor, director, writer
- Tom Geens, director
- Tom Harper, director
- Tom Hooper, director
- Tony Bevan, artist
- Tracey Emin, artist
- Tracey Seaward, producer
- Vicky Featherstone, artisticdDirector of the Royal Court Theatre, London
- Wayne McGregor CBE, choreographer and founder of Studio Wayne McGregor
- Wolfgang Tillmans, RA artist
- Yana Peel, CEO of the Serpentine Galleries

==== Economists' letter ====
In a letter to The Times, 279 economists stated that Brexit would "entail significant long-term costs". The signatories wrote, "focusing entirely on the economics, we consider that it would be a major mistake for the UK to leave the European Union." At the time of publication the letter had 199 signatories. A further 80 signed after publication.

==== Lawyers' report ====
Around 300 lawyers signed a report on UK membership of the EU and the alternatives. They stated: "we recognised how much of the debate on the UK's membership of the EU is based on a lack of information, misconceptions, or, worse, misinformation [...] Ultimately, we believe a sensible judgment on EU membership can be made only on the basis of reliable evidence". The signatories "consider that the UK's interests are best served by remaining in the EU".

==== Historians letter ====
In a letter to the Guardian, more than 300 prominent historians urged the United Kingdom to remain in the European Union. The letter said, "On 23 June, we face a choice: to cast ourselves adrift, condemning ourselves to irrelevance and Europe to division and weakness; or to reaffirm our commitment to the EU and stiffen the cohesion of our continent in a dangerous world." Notable signatories included:

- Professor Simon Schama
- Professor Ian Kershaw
- Professor Niall Ferguson
- Dr Juliet Gardiner
- D. R. Thorpe
- Professor David Runciman
- Richard Davenport-Hines
- Professor Colin Jones
- Professor Michael Burleigh
- Professor Roy Foster
- Dr Marc Morris
- Dr Suzannah Lipscomb
- Professor Ali Ansari
- Robert Lacey
- Professor Richard Overy
- Professor Beatrice Heuser
- Professor Richard Bessel
- Professor Patricia Clavin
- Professor Dominic Lieven
- Professor Keith Thomas

==== Armed forces and security services ====
- Sir Jonathan Evans, former director general of MI5
- Eliza Manningham-Buller, former director general of MI5
- Sir John Sawers, former chief of the Secret Intelligence Service (MI6)
- Sir Hugh Orde, former president of the Association of Chief Police Officers, and former chief constable of the Police Service of Northern Ireland
- Lynne Owens, Director-General of the National Crime Agency
- General Lord Dannatt, former chief of the General Staff
- General Sir Rupert Smith, former Deputy Supreme Allied Commander Europe
- Lieutenant General Sir John Kiszeley, former Deputy Supreme Allied Commander Europe
- Admiral Sir Mark Stanhope, former First Sea Lord
- Lord Stirrup, marshal of the Royal Air Force, former Chief of Defence Staff
- Robert Wainwright, director of Europol
- Lieutenant-General Sir Richard Shirreff, former Deputy Supreme Allied Commander of NATO
- Peter Carington, 6th Baron Carrington, former Secretary General of NATO
- Field Marshal Edwin Bramall, Baron Bramall, former chief of Defence Staff, British Army
- Admiral of the Fleet Michael Boyce, Baron Boyce, former chief of Defence Staff, Royal Navy
- General Sir Mike Jackson, former chief of the General Staff, British Army
- Lieutenant General Sir Rob Fry, former deputy chief of Defence Staff, Royal Marines
- Jonathan Shaw, major-general, British Army

==== Letters to The Guardian by European writers ====
On 4 June 2016, The Guardian newspaper published a number of 'letters to Britain' by European (non-British) writers and intellectuals giving their opinion on the referendum and Britain's place in Europe. All of the letters expressed support for remain. The writers were:

- Elena Ferrante, Italian
- Javier Marías, Spanish
- Timur Vermes, German
- Anne Enright, Irish
- Yanis Varoufakis, Greek
- Riad Sattouf, French
- Jonas Jonasson, Swedish
- Kapka Kassabova, Bulgarian
- Slavoj Žižek, Slovenian

==== Nobel Prize laureates letter ====
On 10 June 2016, The Daily Telegraph published a letter signed by 13 winners of the Nobel Prize expressing the view that being part of the EU is good for British science and that is good for Britain.

- Dr Sydney Brenner, laureate, Physiology or Medicine 2002
- Sir Martin Evans, laureate, Physiology or Medicine 2007
- Sir Andre Geim, laureate, Physics 2010
- Sir John Gurdon, laureate, Physiology or Medicine 2012
- Professor Peter Higgs, laureate, Physics 2013
- Sir Tim Hunt, laureate, Physiology or Medicine 2001
- Dr Tomas Lindahl, laureate, Chemistry 2015
- Sir Kostya Novoselov, laureate, Physics 2010
- Sir Paul Nurse, laureate, Physiology or Medicine 2001
- Professor John O'Keefe, laureate, Physiology or Medicine 2014
- Sir Richard Roberts, laureate, Physiology or Medicine 1993
- Sir John Sulston, laureate, Physiology or Medicine 2002
- Sir John Walker, laureate, Chemistry 1997

==== Nobel Prize in Economics laureates letter ====
On 19 June 2016, The Guardian published a letter signed by 10 winners of the Nobel Memorial Prize in Economic Sciences, expressing the view that the "economic argument" was clearly in favour of continued UK membership within the EU.

- George Akerlof, laureate, 2001
- Kenneth Arrow, laureate, 1972
- Angus Deaton, laureate, 2015
- Peter Diamond, laureate, 2010
- James Heckman, laureate, 2000
- Eric Maskin, laureate, 2007
- Sir James Mirrlees, laureate, 1996
- Christopher A. Pissarides, laureate, 2010
- Robert Solow, laureate, 1987
- Jean Tirole, laureate, 2014

== Leave ==
=== Registered political parties ===
Parties organised in more than one of the Home Nations:

- Britain First
- British Democratic Party
- British National Party (BNP)
- Communist Party of Great Britain (Marxist–Leninist)
- The Justice & Anti-Corruption Party
- Independence from Europe
- Liberal Party
- Libertarian Party (UK)
- Liberty GB
- New Communist Party of Britain
- Respect Party
- Revolutionary Communist Party of Britain (Marxist–Leninist)
- Socialist Labour Party
- Trade Unionist and Socialist Coalition
- UK Independence Party (UKIP)
- Workers Revolutionary Party

Parties in England:

- English Democrats

Parties in Scotland:

- Scottish Democratic Alliance
- Scottish Libertarian Party
- Solidarity

Parties in Northern Ireland:

- Democratic Unionist Party (DUP)
- Éirígí
- Irish Republican Socialist Party
- People Before Profit
- Traditional Unionist Voice (TUV)
- Workers' Party

=== Business leaders ===
- Anthony Bamford, businessman and chairman of JCB
- Arron Banks, businessman
- Duncan Bannatyne, entrepreneur, philanthropist and author
- Robin Birley, businessman
- Harriet Bridgeman, founder of the Bridgeman Art Library
- Dominic Burke, CEO of Jardine Lloyd Thompson
- Michael Burrage, entrepreneur and former Harvard University research fellow
- John Caudwell, founder of Phones 4u
- Jan Colam, fish processing company owner
- Peter Cruddas, founder of CMC Markets
- Sir James Dyson, founder of Dyson
- Bernie Ecclestone, CEO, Formula One Group
- Scott Fletcher, entrepreneur
- Howard Flight, chairman, Flight & Partners
- Sir Rocco Forte, hotelier
- Michael Geoghegan, former CEO, HSBC
- Peter Goldstein, co-founder of Superdrug
- Rupert Hambro, co-founder of J.O. Hambro Capital Management
- Peter Hargreaves, co-founder of Hargreaves Lansdown
- Oliver Hemsley, CEO, Numis Securities
- Robert Hiscox, former chairman of Hiscox
- Alexander S. Hoare, banker and managing partner of C Hoare & Co
- Will Hobhouse, chairman of Heal's
- John Hoerner, former CEO of Burton Group
- Jeremy Hosking, major shareholder in Crystal Palace F.C.
- Digby Jones, Baron Jones of Birmingham, former director-general of the Confederation of British Industry
- Luke Johnson, serial entrepreneur and chairman of Risk Capital Partners and Patisserie Valerie
- Lord Kalms, former chairman of Dixons Retail
- John Longworth, former director-general of the British Chambers of Commerce
- Mark Loveday, former senior partner of Cazenove, and former chairman of Foreign & Colonial Investment Trust
- Rupert Lowe, former chairman of Southampton Football Club
- Paul Marshall, investor
- Tim Martin, founder of Wetherspoons
- John Mills, founder of JML
- Helena Morrissey, CEO of Newton Investment Management
- Jon Moulton, founder of Better Capital
- Jon Moynihan, chairman of Ipex Capital
- Rupert Murdoch, American media tycoon and owner of The Sun and The Times
- Jim O'Neill, Baron O'Neill of Gatley, former chairman of Goldman Sachs Asset Management
- Sir David Ord, co-owner of Bristol Ports
- Crispin Odey, hedge fund manager and the founding partner of Odey Asset Management
- Theo Paphitis, businessman and Dragons' Den TV star
- Alex Polizzi, hotelier and TV presenter
- Sir Patrick Sheehy, former chairman of British American Tobacco
- Denys Shortt, businessman
- Terry Smith, former CEO of Tullett Prebon and CEO of Fundsmith
- Richard Tice, property entrepreneur
- John Timpson, CEO and owner of Timpson
- Stuart Wheeler, founder IG Index
- Bert Wiegman, founder and partner of Langholm Capital
- Jack Wigglesworth, founder and former chairman of LIFFE
- Simon Wolfson, chief executive of Next
- William Wright, founder of Wrightbus and director of the Wrights Group, a bus and coach building company in Northern Ireland; also a former Unionist politician

=== Politicians ===
Only politicians who hold positions that differ from the party line or whose party is officially neutral are listed here.

==== Conservative Party ====
Within the Conservative Party (which was officially neutral): Five Cabinet members:

- Michael Gove (Lord Chancellor and Secretary of State for Justice)
- Chris Grayling (Leader of the House of Commons and the Lord President of the Council)
- Priti Patel (Minister of State for Employment)
- Theresa Villiers (Secretary of State for Northern Ireland)
- John Whittingdale (Secretary of State for Culture, Media and Sport)

At the time the referendum was called, the Secretary of State for Work and Pensions was Iain Duncan Smith, who also supports leave. He subsequently resigned following the 2016 United Kingdom budget. Some suspected his resignation was due to his support for British withdrawal from the EU, but Duncan Smith has denied this, stating that such allegations were a "deliberate attempt to discredit" him.

As well as these ministers, the former Mayor of London Boris Johnson; the Conservative candidate for the 2016 mayoral election, Zac Goldsmith; former leader Michael Howard, former Defence Secretary Liam Fox and the leader of the Welsh Conservative Party Andrew RT Davies campaigned to leave. The party campaign to exit the EU was "Conservatives for Britain" which is headed by two former Chancellors of the Exchequer, Nigel Lawson and Norman Lamont).

Many other Conservative MPs announced that they would campaign for Britain to vote to Leave:

- Steve Barclay (North East Cambridgeshire)
- John Baron (Basildon and Billericay)
- Victoria Borwick (Kensington)
- Graham Brady (Altrincham and Sale West)
- Julian Brazier (Canterbury)
- Fiona Bruce (Congleton)
- Conor Burns (Bournemouth West)
- Christopher Chope (Christchurch)
- James Cleverly (Braintree)
- Christopher Davies (Brecon and Radnorshire)
- Nadine Dorries (Mid Bedfordshire)
- George Eustice (Camborne and Redruth)
- Michael Fabricant (Lichfield)
- Liam Fox (North Somerset)
- Richard Fuller (Bedford)
- Cheryl Gillan (Chesham and Amersham)
- Ian Liddell-Grainger (Bridgwater and West Somerset)
- Chris Green (Bolton West)
- Rebecca Harris (Castle Point)
- Sir Gerald Howarth (Aldershot)
- Ranil Jayawardena (North East Hampshire)
- Edward Leigh (Gainsborough)
- Karl McCartney (Lincoln)
- Nigel Mills (Amber Valley)
- Anne Marie Morris (Newton Abbot)
- David Nuttall (Bury North)
- Andrew Percy (Brigg and Goole)
- Will Quince (Colchester)
- Jacob Rees-Mogg (North East Somerset)
- Bob Stewart (Beckenham)
- Desmond Swayne (New Forest West)
- Anne-Marie Trevelyan (Berwick-upon-Tweed)
- Martin Vickers (Cleethorpes)
- Charles Walker (Broxbourne)
- David Jones (Clwyd West)
- Jason McCartney (Colne Valley)
- Tom Pursglove (Corby)
- Henry Smith (Crawley)
- Gareth Johnson (Dartford)
- Chris Heaton-Harris (Daventry)
- Mike Wood (Dudley South)
- Tim Loughton (East Worthing and Shoreham)
- Greg Knight (East Yorkshire)
- Mims Davies (Eastleigh)
- David Burrowes (Enfield Southgate)
- Eleanor Laing (Epping Forest)
- Dominic Raab (Esher and Walton)
- Suella Fernandes (Fareham)
- Jack Lopresti (Filton and Bradley Stoke)
- Rehman Chishti (Gillingham and Rainham)
- Adam Holloway (Gravesham)
- David Davis (Haltemprice and Howden)
- Bob Blackman (Harrow East)
- Bernard Jenkin (Harwich and North Essex)
- William Wragg (Hazel Grove)
- Mike Penning (Hemel Hempstead)
- Matthew Offord (Hendon)
- Andrew Bingham (High Peak)
- Peter Lilley (Hitchin and Harpenden)
- Andrew Turner (Isle of Wight)
- Philip Hollobone (Kettering)
- Maria Caulfield (Lewes)
- Michael Tomlinson (Mid Dorset and North Poole)
- Iain Stewart (Milton Keynes South)
- David TC Davies (Monmouth)
- Andrea Jenkyns (Morley and Outwood)
- Julian Lewis (New Forest East)
- Scott Mann (North Cornwall)
- Bill Wiggin (North Herefordshire)
- Owen Paterson (North Shropshire)
- Justin Tomlinson (North Swindon)
- Craig Tracey (North Warwickshire)
- Kit Malthouse (North West Hampshire)
- Andrew Bridgen (North West Leicestershire)
- Henry Bellingham (North West Norfolk)
- James Gray (North Wiltshire)
- Andrew Stephenson (Pendle)
- Stewart Jackson (Peterborough)
- Robert Syms (Poole)
- Penny Mordaunt (Portsmouth North)
- Stuart Andrew (Pudsey)
- Mark Francois (Rayleigh and Wickford)
- Karen Lumley (Redditch)
- Crispin Blunt (Reigate)
- Nigel Evans (Ribble Valley)
- Rishi Sunak (Richmond)
- James Duddridge (Rochford and Southend East)
- Andrew Rosindell (Romford)
- Nigel Adams (Selby and Ainsty)
- Philip Davies (Shipley)
- Daniel Kawczynski (Shrewsbury and Atcham)
- Gordon Henderson (Sittingbourne and Sheppey)
- Stephen Phillips (Sleaford and North Hykeham)
- David Warburton (Somerton and Frome)
- Stephen Metcalfe (South Basildon and East Thurrock)
- Heather Wheeler (South Derbyshire)
- Richard Drax (South Dorset)
- Sheryll Murray (South East Cornwall)
- John Hayes (South Holland and The Deepings)
- Richard Bacon (South Norfolk)
- Andrea Leadsom (South Northamptonshire)
- Seema Kennedy (South Ribble)
- Craig Mackinlay (South Thanet)
- Andrew Murrison (South West Wiltshire)
- David Amess (Southend West)
- Royston Smith (Southampton Itchen)
- Kwasi Kwarteng (Spelthorne)
- Anne Main (St Albans)
- Steve Double (St Austell and Newquay)
- Derek Thomas (St Ives)
- Stephen McPartland (Stevenage)
- James Wharton (Stockton South)
- Bill Cash (Stone)
- Nadhim Zahawi (Stratford-on-Avon)
- Paul Scully (Sutton and Cheam)
- Christopher Pincher (Tamworth)
- Lucy Allan (Telford)
- Laurence Robertson (Tewkesbury)
- Geoffrey Clifton-Brown (The Cotswolds)
- Geoffrey Cox (Torridge and West Devon)
- Boris Johnson (Uxbridge and South Ruislip)
- James Davies (Vale of Clwyd)
- Nus Ghani (Wealden)
- Peter Bone (Wellingborough)
- Adam Afriyie (Windsor)
- Jonathan Lord (Woking)
- John Redwood (Wokingham)
- Steven Baker (Wycombe)
- Marcus Fysh (Yeovil)
- Julian Sturdy (York Outer)
- Caroline Ansell (Eastbourne)
- Conservatives MEPs include Daniel Hannan, Andrew Lewer, Emma McClarkin, Amjad Bashir, David Campbell-Bannerman and Syed Kamall
- Conservative peers include Lords Trimble (David Trimble), Tebbit (Norman Tebbit), Kalms (former Tory treasurer and former Dixons Retail chairman), The Marquess of Lothian (Michael Ancram), and Lord Framer, former treasurer, Lord Dobbs, Baron Leach and former deputy party chairman Michael Ashcroft
- The Bow Group, a Conservative think-tank, also lent its support to the Leave.EU campaign.
- Scottish Conservative MSPs include Margaret Mitchell, Graham Simpson, Alexander Stewart, Ross Thomson, Gordon Lindhurst and Oliver Mundell.
- Former Conservative MPs Esther McVey (Wirral West (2010–2015)), Louise Mensch (Corby (2010–2012)), Michael Portillo (Enfield Southgate), Ann Widdecombe (Maidstone) and Teddy Taylor (Glasgow Cathcart)

==== Labour Party ====
Within the Labour Party (which supported Remain): Labour Leave was headed by donor John Mills.

Labour MPs supporting a Leave vote:

- Ronnie Campbell (Blyth Valley)
- John Cryer (Leyton and Wanstead) – frontbench member; Chair of the Parliamentary Labour Party
- Frank Field (Birkenhead)
- Roger Godsiff (Birmingham Hall Green)
- Kate Hoey (Vauxhall)
- Kelvin Hopkins (Luton North)
- John Mann (Bassetlaw)
- Dennis Skinner (Bolsover)
- Graham Stringer (Blackley and Broughton)
- Gisela Stuart (Birmingham Edgbaston)

Labour MSPs:

- Elaine Smith

Former Labour MPs:

- Ian Davidson (Glasgow South West 1992–2015)
- Sir Patrick Duffy (Colne Valley 1963–1966; Sheffield Attercliffe 1970–1992)
- Bryan Gould (Southampton Test 1974–1979; Dagenham 1983–1994) – Labour leadership candidate in 1992
- Nigel Griffiths (Edinburgh South 1987–2010)
- Tom Harris (Glasgow South 2001–2015)
- Austin Mitchell (Great Grimsby 1977–2015)
- Ronald Thomas (Bristol North West 1974–1979)

==== Green Party ====
Within the Green Party (which supported Remain): the Green Leaves organisation campaigned on behalf of Green Party members who advocated a leave vote. Member of the House of Lords and former London Assembly Member Jenny Jones (Baroness Jones) campaigned to leave.

==== Liberal Democrats ====
Within the Liberal Democrats (which supported Remain): the Liberal Leave campaign was headed by former Hereford MP, Paul Keetch.

==== Scottish National Party ====
Within the SNP (which supported Remain): former SNP deputy leader and MP Jim Sillars and former SNP leader and MP Gordon Wilson endorsed a leave vote in the referendum. Former Scottish government minister Alex Neil declared that he voted leave and that several of his fellow SNP MSPs did likewise. There were multiple groups for SNP members advocating a leave vote, such as SNP Vote Leave and SNP GO!

==== Ulster Unionist Party ====
Within the UUP (which supported Remain): Harold McKee MLA and former leader Tom Elliott MP

==== Independent ====
- Lord Owen, currently an independent Social Democrat peer, former Labour Foreign Secretary and leader (and co-founder) of the Social Democratic Party
- Lord Kilclooney, currently a crossbench peer, former Ulster Unionist Party MP and MEP
- Lord Stoddart, member of the House of Lords since 1983 (formerly a Labour peer) and Independent Labour peer since 2002

=== International figures ===
==== From other European Union member states ====
- Jimmie Åkesson, chairman of the Sweden Democrats
- Karmenu Mifsud Bonnici, former prime minister of Malta
- Professor Anthony Coughlan, secretary of The National Platform for EU Research and Information Centre and retired Senior Lecturer Emeritus in Social Policy at Trinity College Dublin
- Michel Debray, French admiral and politician
- Luke 'Ming' Flanagan, Irish independent MEP and former TD
- Janusz Korwin-Mikke MEP, leader of the Polish Coalition for the Renewal of the Republic–Liberty and Hope
- Marine Le Pen MEP, leader of the French National Front and co-chair of the Europe of Nations and Freedom
- Marion Maréchal-Le Pen, French MP and member of the National Front
- Patricia McKenna, Irish independent Green politician and former MEP
- Florian Philippot, vice-president of the French Front National
- Thomas Pringle, member of the Dáil Éireann of Ireland
- Matteo Salvini MEP, leader of the Italian Northern League
- Jonas Sjöstedt, chairman of the Swedish Left Party
- Tom Van Grieken, president of the Belgian Vlaams Belang
- Geert Wilders, leader of the Dutch Party for Freedom

==== Other countries ====
- John Bolton, American diplomat and former US ambassador to the United Nations
- Swapan Dasgupta, senior Indian journalist and Member of Parliament in Rajya Sabha
- Guðlaugur Þór Þórðarson, former Icelandic Minister of Health and MP for the Icelandic Independence Party
- John Howard, former Prime Minister of Australia
- Mike Huckabee, Republican presidential candidate in 2008 and 2016 and former governor of Arkansas
- Johnny Ingebrigtsen, member of the Norwegian Parliament for the Socialist Left Party
- David Leyonhjelm, Australian Liberal Democrat senator
- Ola Borten Moe, Norwegian Member of Parliament
- Deepak Obhrai, Canadian Conservative MP and Official Opposition Critic for International Development
- Liv Signe Navarsete, Norwegian former leader of the Centre Party and government minister
- James Paterson, Australian Liberal senator
- Rand Paul, former Republican presidential candidate 2016 and U.S. senator from Kentucky
- Ron Paul, former United States congressman and Republican presidential candidate in 2008 and 2012
- Winston Peters, leader of the New Zealand First party and former deputy prime minister of New Zealand
- Lukas Reimann and Thomas Aeschi, members of the National Council for the Swiss People's Party
- Andrew Scheer, Conservative Party of Canada MP and Opposition House Leader (later became Conservative leader in 2017)
- Prabowo Subianto, chairman of Gerindra and Indonesian presidential candidate of both 2014 and 2019
- Sir David Tang, Hong Kong businessman and socialite
- Donald Trump, 45th president of the United States
- Sebastian Vallin, leader of Liberala partiet
- Trygve Slagsvold Vedum, leader of Centre Party (Norway)

=== Businesses ===
- Aspall Cider, cider manufacturers
- JCB, manufacturing company
- Tate and Lyle, agribusiness
- Wetherspoons, pub chain

=== Newspapers and magazines ===
==== British newspapers and magazines ====
- Daily Express
- Daily Mail
- The Daily Telegraph
- MoneyWeek
- Morning Star, also backed a No vote in the 1975 referendum.
- The News Letter
- The Spectator, also backed a No vote in the 1975 referendum.
- Spiked
- The Sun
- The Sun on Sunday
- Sunday Express
- Sunday Sport
- The Sunday Telegraph
- The Sunday Times

==== Foreign newspapers and magazines ====
- National Review, US current affairs magazine

=== Local government authorities ===
- Bromley London Borough Council (Conservative controlled)
- Havering London Borough Council (Conservative-Residents controlled) became the first council in the UK to back Brexit.
- Lincolnshire County Council (Conservative controlled)
- Portsmouth City Council (Conservative minority)
- Thanet District Council (UKIP controlled)
- Thurrock Council (UKIP – Conservative controlled)

=== Organisations ===
==== Trade unions ====
- Associated Society of Locomotive Engineers and Firemen (ASLEF)
- Bakers, Food and Allied Workers' Union (BFAWU)
- Indian Workers' Association
- National Union of Rail, Maritime and Transport Workers (RMT)
- Northern Ireland Public Service Alliance (NIPSA)

==== Other organisations ====
- Bangladesh Caterers Association UK
- Bow Group
- The Bruges Group
- Commonwealth Freedom of Movement Organisation

=== Noted individuals ===
Security and armed forces:
- Vice Admiral Sir Jeremy Blackham, senior Royal Navy officer
- Colonel Tim Collins, British Army officer
- Major General Tim Cross, senior British Army officer
- Sir Richard Dearlove, former head of MI6
- Field Marshal Charles Guthrie, Baron Gutherie, former Chief of Defence Staff, British Army, previously backed a remain vote
- Rear Admiral Richard Heaslip, senior Royal Navy officer
- Rear Admiral Roger Lane-Nott, senior Royal Navy officer
- Lieutenant-General Jonathon Riley, senior British Army officer and military historian
- General Sir Michael Rose, senior British Army officer
- Julian Thompson, former major general in the Royal Marines
- Major General Nick Vaux, senior Royal Marine officer

Economists:

- Roger Bootle, economist
- Tim Congdon, economist and formerly one of the Treasury's panel of 'wise men'
- Bernard Connolly, economist and former head of the unit responsible for the European Monetary System and monetary policies in the European Commission
- Larry Elliott, economist and economics editor of The Guardian
- Liam Halligan, economist, journalist and broadcaster
- Hans-Hermann Hoppe, economist and founder of the Property and Freedom Society
- Ruth Lea, economist and former head of policy at the Institute of Directors
- Mark Littlewood, director general of the Institute of Economic Affairs (IEA) and former chief press spokesman for the Liberal Democrats and the Pro Euro Conservative Party
- Gerard Lyons, economist
- Patrick Minford, economist and formerly one of the Treasury's panel of 'wise men'

Journalists:

- Christopher Booker, journalist and author
- Patrick Collinson, journalist and money editor of The Guardian
- Iain Dale, LBC radio station presenter
- Janet Daley, journalist
- Alex Deane, writer and commentator
- James Delingpole, journalist
- Ambrose Evans-Pritchard, business editor of The Daily Telegraph
- Julia Hartley-Brewer, broadcaster and journalist
- Allister Heath, journalist
- Simon Heffer, journalist
- John King, author
- Kelvin MacKenzie, journalist
- Noel Malcolm, journalist, historian and academic
- Carole Malone, journalist and broadcaster
- Leo McKinstry, journalist
- Tim Montgomerie, blogger, columnist for The Times and creator of ConservativeHome
- Charles Moore, journalist and former editor of The Daily Telegraph
- Douglas Murray, journalist and writer
- Fraser Nelson, editor of The Spectator
- Richard North, blogger, author and journalist
- Tony Parsons, journalist
- Allison Pearson, journalist and author
- Melanie Phillips, journalist
- Matt Ridley, journalist
- Selina Scott, broadcaster and journalist
- Merryn Somerset Webb, editor
- Tim Stanley, journalist
- Tom Utley, journalist
- Toby Young, journalist and author

Writers:

- Tariq Ali, writer and political activist
- Julian Fellowes (Lord Fellowes), actor, novelist, film director and screenwriter
- Frederick Forsyth, novelist
- Claire Fox, writer and broadcaster
- Adam Hamdy, writer, film producer and director
- Mark Millar, comic book writer
- Dreda Say Mitchell, novelist, broadcaster and journalist
- Justin Raimondo, author and editor of the libertarian website Antiwar.com
- Mark Steyn, author, journalist and political commentator
- Tim Worstall, writer and senior fellow of the Adam Smith Institute

Historians:

- Edward Chancellor, financial historian, journalist and investment strategist
- Tim Knox, director of the Fitzwilliam Museum
- Andrew Roberts, historian
- David Starkey, historian, academic and television presenter

Trade unionists:

- Mick Cash, trade union leader
- Doug Nicholls, trade union leader
- Mick Whelan, trade union leader

Music artists:

- Matt Bellamy, musician, though stated he wanted the UK to remain in the single market and retain freedom of movement
- Roger Daltrey, singer, The Who
- Bruce Dickinson, heavy metal singer, Iron Maiden vocalist, pilot, writer, TV presenter and entrepreneur
- Morrissey, singer-songwriter
- Mike Oldfield, musician, composer and multi-instrumentalist
- Elaine Paige, singer and actress
- Mark E. Smith, singer (The Fall)
- Ringo Starr, drummer for The Beatles
- Roy Wood, multi-instrumentalist

Sports personalities:

- Sir Ian Botham, cricketer
- Geoffrey Boycott, cricketer
- Sol Campbell, former professional footballer
- David Icke, former professional footballer, writer and conspiracy theorist
- David James, former professional footballer
- Perry McCarthy, racing driver
- Graeme Souness, former professional footballer and pundit

Artists:

- David Bailey, photographer

Actors and actresses:

- Roseanne Barr, actress and comedian
- Michael Caine, actor
- John Cleese, actor and comedian
- Dame Joan Collins, actress
- Keith Chegwin, actor and presenter
- Edward Fox, actor
- Kelsey Grammer, actor
- Charles Lawson, actor
- John Rhys-Davies, actor
- James Woods, actor

Religious figures:

- The Rev. Giles Fraser, priest of the Church of England, and journalist

Others:

- Julian Assange, founder of WikiLeaks
- Carl Benjamin, aka Sargon of Akkad, YouTube commentator
- Roy Chubby Brown, comedian
- Dia Chakravarty, activist
- Piers Corbyn, owner of WeatherAction and brother of Labour leader Jeremy Corbyn
- David Deutsch, British physicist who pioneered the field of quantum computation
- Gillian Duffy, a woman who Gordon Brown referred to as a 'bigot' in the 2010 election campaign ("bigotgate")
- Martin Durkin, television director
- Matthew Elliott, founder of the TaxPayers' Alliance and Big Brother Watch
- George Galloway, broadcaster and former Labour/Respect MP
- Ben Garrison, political cartoonist
- Chloe Goodman, model
- Stuart "Captain Calamity" Hill, Shetland Islands sovereignty campaigner
- Steve Hilton, former adviser to David Cameron
- Alex Jones, radio host and conspiracy theorist
- Ulrika Jonsson, television presenter
- Jodie Marsh, model, bodybuilder and TV personality
- Gillian McKeith, celebrity nutritionist
- Stefan Molyneux, YouTube personality
- Brian Monteith, public relations consultant and commentator
- Geoff Norcott, comedian
- Sharon Osbourne, reality TV judge and music manager
- Vicky Pattison, TV personality
- Mike Read, disc jockey
- Jeff Rense, radio host and conspiracy theorist
- Anthony Worrall Thompson, restaurateur and celebrity chef
- Anne Marie Waters, political activist
- Paul Joseph Watson, YouTube personality

== Officially endorse neither side ==
=== Government ===
==== Other Crown dependencies ====
- Government of the Isle of Man

=== Registered political parties ===
- Conservative Party – allowed members free choice, suspending collective ministerial responsibility.
- Official Monster Raving Loony Party – supports a vote on "In", "Out" or "Shake it all about".
- Socialist Equality Party – supports an electoral boycott.
- Women's Equality Party – non-partisan on the issue, argues that EU gains on women's rights should not be lost if Britain withdraws.

=== Businesses ===
- Lloyds Banking Group
- Morrisons
- Sainsbury's
- Tesco
- South West Trains

=== Newspapers and magazines ===
- i
- Yorkshire Post

=== International figures ===
- Ted Cruz, US senator and 2016 Republican presidential candidate
- Gary Johnson, 2016 Libertarian Party presidential candidate
- Vladimir Putin, president of Russia
- Paul Ryan, former Speaker of the US House of Representatives

=== Organisations ===
- 38 Degrees, supports giving clear information about the referendum and the European Union
- Church of England
- Open Europe, think tank advocating liberal, market-orientated and decentralising reforms within the European Union
- Patricia Scotland, Baroness Scotland, Commonwealth Secretary-General, stated Commonwealth had no unified position on Britain should stay or go, but that the idea to replace the EU with the Commonwealth is a false choice.
