= Scott Fletcher =

Scott Fletcher may refer to:

- Scott Fletcher (baseball) (born 1958), former infielder in Major League Baseball
- Scott Fletcher (entrepreneur) (born 1973), British entrepreneur
- Scott Fletcher (ice hockey) (born 1988), American ice hockey defenceman
- Michael Scott Fletcher, commonly known as Scott Fletcher, Australian Methodist minister
