= Iacobescu =

Iacobescu (Romanian pronunciation: [jakoˈbesku]) is a Romanian surname, derived from the given name Jacob. Notable people with the name include:

- Antonia Iacobescu (born 1989), Romanian singer and model
- Dumitru Iacobescu (1893–1913), Romanian Symbolist poet
- George Iacobescu (born 1945), Romanian-British businessman, the chief executive of Canary Wharf Group

== See also ==
- Iacobeşti (plural form)
