= Mark Loveday =

British businessman (1943–2024)

- Born: Mark Antony Loveday; 22 September 1943
- Died: 4 September 2024 (aged 80)
- Education: Winchester College
- Alma mater: Magdalen College, Oxford
- Title: Senior partner, Cazenove (1994–2001); Chairman, Foreign & Colonial Investment Trust (2002–2010)

Mark Antony Loveday (22 September 1943 – 4 September 2024) was a British businessman, the senior partner of stockbrokers Cazenove from 1994 to 2001, and the chairman of Foreign & Colonial Investment Trust from 2002 to 2010.

Loveday was born on 22 September 1943, and educated at Winchester College, and Magdalen College, Oxford. He died from complications of motor neurone disease at home, on 4 September 2024, at the age of 80.
