= Forter Castle =

Castle in Angus, Scotland

Coordinates: 56°45′58″N 3°20′21″W

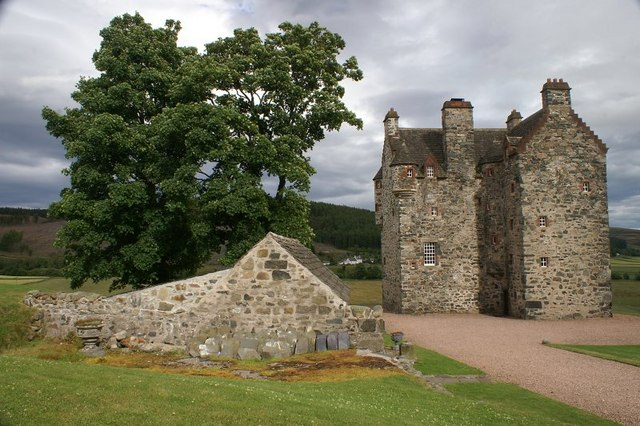
Forter Castle

Forter Castle is located in Glenisla, Perthshire, Scotland. It was built in 1560 by James Ogilvy, the 5th Lord of Airlie. In 1640, it was burned by Archibald Campbell, the 8th Earl of Argyll, but it was rebuilt in the early 1990s.

The grid reference is NO18239 64640 and the latitude/longitude is 56.766148, −3.339154.

The castle is located within Angus council area and inside Cairngorms National Park. It is a Category B historically listed building by Historic Environment Scotland; when listed, it was still a ruin. The listing states that the castle was "perpetuated in ballad, "Bonnie House of Airlie".

== History ==
James Ogilivy, the 5th Lord of Airlie, built Forter Castle as a "fortalice" (fortification) in 1560 to protect the Balloch Pass route to Glenshee from intrusion. One report explains the rationale for the building: "At the time of construction, marauding bands of caterans threatened the settled folk in this area and the clan feuds, stoked by religious differences, as Protestantism came in to supplant the old Catholic religion, made it necessary to build a new fortalice for the house of Ogilvy".

James Ogilvy’s grandson James Ogilvy, the 7th Lord of Airlie, was named the 1st Earl of Airlie by Charles II in 1639. In 1650, James refused to sign the National Covenant, so Forter castle was burnt down by the Duke of Argyll, Archibald Campbell, along with Airlie Castle. The Ogilvys moved to Cortachy Castle.

=== Restoration ===
In 1988, the castle was purchased by Robert Pooley who decided to rebuild and refurnish it with guidance from Scottish Heritage. The exterior work consumed two years. A summary of the project states that "they studied the scarring in the remaining stones to recreate the original layout of a traditional L-shaped 16th century fortified house. The only deliberate change was to make the Laird’s bedroom the full expanse of the castle and the same dimensions as the Great Hall". The interior renovations and decorating started afterwards. The interior of the rebuilt castle was designed by Pooley's daughter, Katharine Pooley.

As of 2020, the castle was owned by Katherine Pooley (since 2003); it was used at times by Katherine and her spouse Daniel Voyce. At other times, the castle was rented out on a self-catering basis. The chapel in the basement was sometimes used for weddings. One report on the completed castle stated that "all 21st century creature comforts have been added whilst retaining complete authenticity with the castle’s original history" and that "Katharine's interior design has incorporated antiquated touches."

== Architecture ==
An 1899 report by D MacGibbon and T Ross provided these specifics about the castle:

This castle consists of an oblong block c. 39' x 26'6" with a tower at the SE corner measuring c. 21' square, so that it is a variation of the L-plan. The entrance is in the tower, in the re-entrant angle. Above the main stair landing – in the tower – the ceiling is vaulted. The ground floor of the main block was divided into three vaulted compartments, with a passage leading to them. One of these was the kitchen, and has an unusually large fireplace. The Hall was on the first floor with a large fireplace in the S wall, and another in the W wall. Above the Hall, there appears to have been second and third floors with an attic. On the third floors were corbelled turrets on the NE and NW angles.

A 1958 visit to the site by an archaeologist produced this updated summary of its condition at that time:

a roofless ruin of the late 16th century, remaining generally as described and planned by MacGibbon and Ross ... except that vault and fireplace features have been destroyed. A circular stair turret protrudes in the re-entrant angle above the door-way on the S.

The rebuilt castle consists of a main block with a wing projecting from the southeast corner. The ground floor of the castle was divided into two cellars and a kitchen, all of them vaulted, although the subdividing walls were missing prior to the restoration The hall is on the first floor and there are another two floors above it with an attic. The kitchen in the basement fills the area that would have been the dungeon in the original building.

The castle has five floors. On first floor there is a hall, the second floor has a master bedroom, and the third floor has three more bedrooms. The great hall fills the width of the building and a fireplace covers much of one side; the "laird’s bedroom" fills the second floor.
