= Ralph Halpern =

British businessman (1938–2022)

Sir Ralph Halpern
- Born: Ralph Marcel Halpern; 24 October 1938; Hendon, Middlesex, England
- Died: 10 August 2022 (aged 83); Florida, U.S.
- Title: CEO of Burton Group; Founder of Topshop
- Term: 1978–1991
- Successor: John Hoerner
- Spouses: Joan Donkin (m. 1967; div. 1999) Laura Blume (m. 2003; div. 2007)
- Children: 2, including Jenny Halpern Prince

Sir Ralph Mark Halpern (born Ralph Marcel Halpern; 24 October 1938 – 10 August 2022) was a British businessman, who was the founder of Topshop and chief executive officer (CEO) of the Burton Group from 1979 to 1991.

== Early life ==
Ralph Marcel Halpern was born in Hendon, Middlesex, England on 24 October 1938, after his Jewish parents fled from the Nazis in the 1930s and emigrated to England, losing their fortune.

== Career ==
Halpern joined Burton Group as a management trainee in 1961, and was directly involved in the establishment of Top Shop (above a Peter Robinson branch) in 1964. On the back of its success he progressed through the managerial ranks becoming chief executive in 1978. He turned it into a retail empire that dominated the British high street, with 2,800 stores and employing more than 60,000 people. With brands including Topshop, Dorothy Perkins, Debenhams, Principles, Racing Green and Evans, it was worth £1.8bn when Halpern was ousted by the board in 1991.

== Personal life and death ==
Halpern was knighted for "services to the retail industry" in the 1986 Birthday Honours. He married Joan Donkin in 1967. They had a daughter, Jenny Halpern Prince, and divorced in 1999. In 1987, he was linked by the British tabloids to a liaison with the page 3 model Fiona Wright, leading to a "five times a night" headline.

In 2000, Halpern became a father again, aged 61, when his second wife and former secretary, Laura Blume, gave birth to a son. He and Laura were subsequently divorced in Miami in 2007.

Halpern died in Florida on 10 August 2022, at the age of 83.
