= Iacobești =

Iacobeşti may refer to:

- Iacobeşti, a village in Roşia Montană commune, Alba County, Romania
- Iacobeşti, a village in Grănicești commune, Suceava County, Romania

== See also ==
- Iacobescu
