= John Hoerner =

American businessman

John Lee Hoerner (born September 1939) is an American businessman, CEO of Burton Group which became Arcadia Group from 1991 to November 2000.

== Early life ==
Hoerner was born in September 1939 in Lincoln, Nebraska

== Career ==
Hoerner was chairman and CEO of the L. S. Ayres division of The May Department Stores Company in the US, before being recruited as chairman and chief executive of Debenhams department store chain in the UK in April 1987. He subsequently became CEO of the Burton Group (later Arcadia Group) from 1991 to November 2000, succeeding Ralph Halpern. He was "abruptly replaced" as chief executive at Arcadia by his "former protege", Stuart Rose.

== Personal life ==
Hoerner and his wife Anna live on a Gloucestershire farm, with three horses, and their rescue dogs from Battersea Dogs & Cats Home.
