= Rupert Pearce =

British lawyer and business executive

Rupert Edward Pearce (born 25 March 1964) is a British lawyer and business executive. He is the former chief executive of the green energy company Highview Power and, prior to that, of the satellite communication company Inmarsat.

He was previously a lawyer with Linklaters and currently holds the role of National Armaments Director within the UK Ministry of Defence.

Pearce was educated at Malvern College and earned an MA in Modern History from Oxford University and graduated from Georgetown University Law Center in Washington, DC, on a Fulbright scholarship.

He is married with three children.
