= Barry Keverne =

British behavioural neuroscientist

Professor Barry Keverne FRS FMedSci

Personal details
- Born: Eric Barrington Keverne c. 1942

Eric Barrington "Barry" Keverne (born c. 1942) is a British behavioural neuroscientist, Professor of Behavioural Neuroscience, 1998–2009, now Emeritus, and Fellow of King's College, Cambridge. Keverne was elected a Fellow of the Royal Society (FRS) in 1997 and of the Academy of Medical Sciences (FMedSci) in 2005.
