= Jill Macleod Clark =

English nursing academic

Professor Dame Jill Macleod Clark, DBE, RGN, FRCN is an English nursing academic. She has held key leadership roles in nursing and healthcare. Her background is in clinical nursing and social psychology. She was Dean of the Faculty of Health Sciences University of Southampton. She is currently Professor Emeritus at the University of Southampton and holds Visiting Professor positions in the UK, Canada and Australia. Clark was made a Fellow of the Royal College of Nursing in 1997 and a Fellow of the Queen's Institute of Community Nursing in 2004.

== Life ==
Educated at the London School of Economics (BSc in social psychology) and at King's College London (PhD), Clark is a former Chair of the Council of Deans of Health and President of the Infection Control Nursing Association. She began her career lecturing at Chelsea College London. She is engaged in policy agendas related to achieving sustainable health care and modernising the health and care workforce. Her research has focussed on the care of people with long term conditions and those at the end of life, inter-professional education and health promotion.

She has been a member of successive UK Research Assessment Exercise panels, including in 2021 the UK Research Excellence Framework Panel for Dentistry, Pharmacy, Nursing and Allied Health Professions. She led the review of the NMC standards for future registered nurses, and is a commissioner on the future NHS review and Chairs the Future Nurse Oversight Board.

Clark was Dean of the Faculty of Health Sciences University of Southampton. She is currently Professor Emeritus at the University of Southampton and holds Visiting Professor positions in the UK, Canada and Australia. She is a trustee of the Florence Nightingale Foundation.

Clark was made a Fellow of the Royal College of Nursing in 1997, and a Fellow of the Queen's Institute of Community Nursing in 2004.
