= Katharine Pooley =

British interior designer

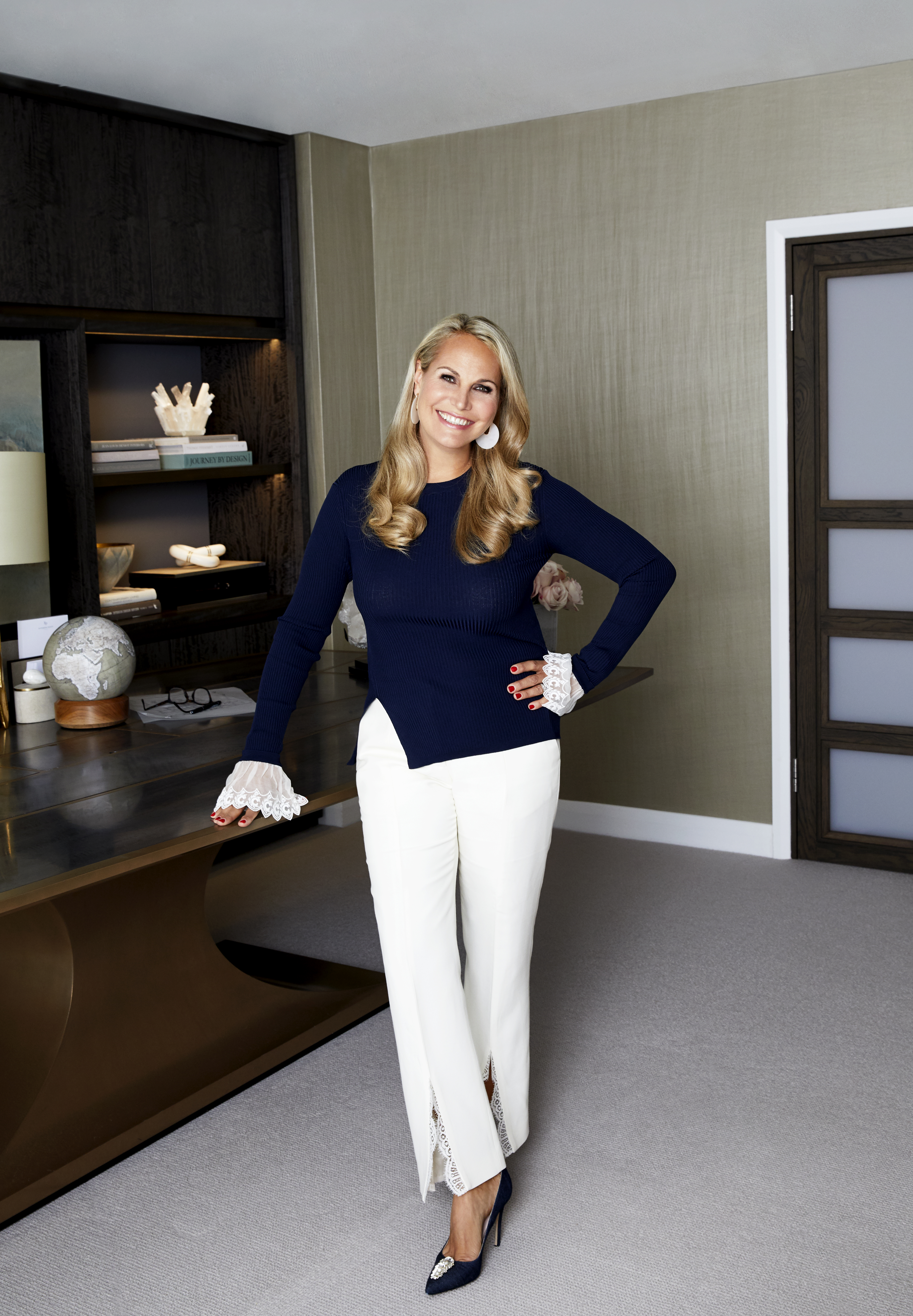
- Born: London, England
- Occupations: Interior designer, Philanthropist, furniture designer, business owner
- Website: www.katharinepooley.com

Katharine Pooley is a British interior designer, and businesswoman, known for her design projects. She owns a homewares boutique and runs an interior design and architecture studio with 50 staff in Chelsea, London. Pooley has designed private homes, castles, villas, hotels, chalets and yachts.

== Early life and education ==
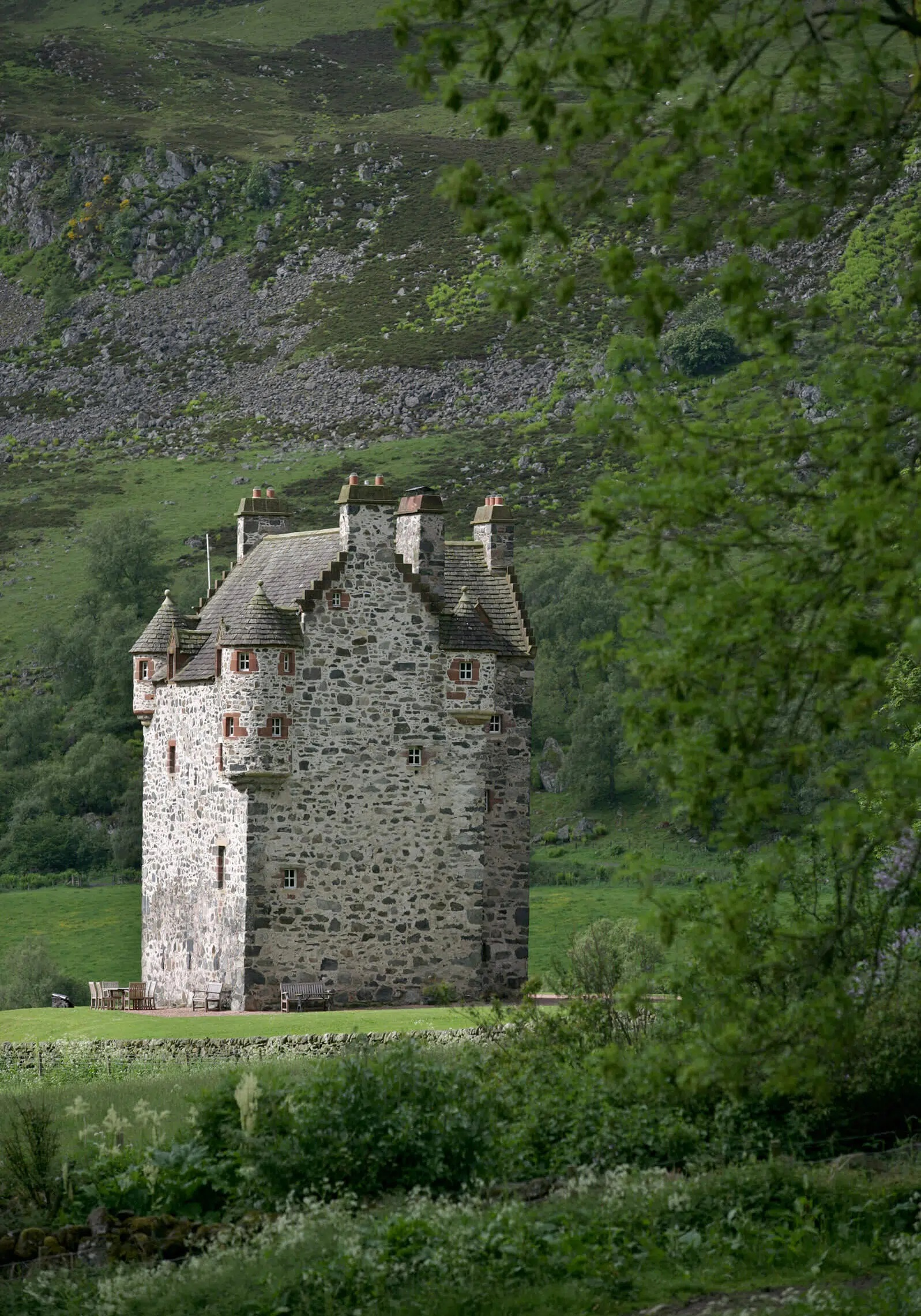
Forter Castle, the Pooley residence in the Scottish Highlands

Pooley was born and raised in Hertfordshire with her five siblings. She was educated first in England at St Mary's Wantage and then studied at the INSA University in Lyon. Her father, Robert Pooley MBE LVO, founded Pooleys Flight Equipment on leaving the RAF in 1957, and in 2005 founded Pooley Sword the leading Cutlers of swords, dirks and lances to the British Armed Forces. He bought Forter Castle in Perthshire around 1988, which the family still owns. Her mother Yvonne Trueman MBE moved to Bahrain where Katharine spent most of her childhood. Her mother was the Arabian Section Governor of the International Women's Flying Organisation for ten years.

Pooley's parents would often take their children on flights in a small Cessna aircraft. These experiences have had an influence on Pooley's work and her love for travel.

Having lived in Asia for 16 years, working for Morgan Stanley, among others, she relocated back to London in 2004.

== Career ==
Pooley opened a luxury home accessories store in 2004 on Walton Street in Chelsea, London, a design studio the following year, and a showroom in Doha in 2012. She has said she was inspired to start a luxury home accessories boutique featuring art and unusual objects found on her travels around the world. This soon evolved into a flourishing design studio which employs designers hailing from over 20 nations. KPL has been at the forefront of the design industry as one of Britain's most sought-after studios with elite clients from all over the world including European and Middle Eastern royal families as well as big names from both the business and celebrity worlds.

Her design philosophy is characterised by a blend of traditional elegance and contemporary sophistication. Although motivated by travel, architecture, fashion, literature and art, she has attributed Mother Nature as her greatest inspiration, citing the beauty and diversity of our environment as a constant solace with her appreciation for the natural world is the seed of every design and as a result, sustainability has become a central pillar of the studio's design process.

Pooley is renowned for her meticulous attention to detail, exquisite craftsmanship, and ability to create spaces that seamlessly marry form and function. Large-scale residential projects in her books include a five-star hotel with a private racing track in Shaoxing, China; beach houses in South Africa, Dubai, country estates and castles in the UK; palaces in Kuwait and Qatar; and city dwellings in Singapore, Washington and London, as well as the Château de la Croix des Gardes - the largest remaining estate on the Cote D'Azur in France. Her more recent works completed include an Alpine Ski Chalet and 'The Gainsborough,' a Grade-II heritage-listed apartment in the historic 9 Millbank development. She is also responsible for the redesign of the Windsor Suite within Terminal 5 at London Heathrow and the VVIP Private Jet Lounge for XJet at London Stansted.

== Notable projects and charity work ==
Pooley is involved in several charities including Lady Garden, United in Design, which promotes diversity in the design industry. Since 2006 Pooley has sat on the board of trustees for Kings College Hospital, one of London's teaching hospitals.

In 2021, Pooley became a trustee of the British Forces Foundation. The Foundation works to boost and maintain the morale of the men and women of the Armed Forces.

== Awards and recognition ==
Katharine Pooley has been named a leading ‘tastemaker' by The Times, and is one of the UK's most sought-after interior designers. Pooley is one of the Lux Deco Top 100 Interior Designers Homes and Garden's Top British 100 Interior Designers, The Times Top 50 Interior Designers and has been named one of the Top 50 Finest Interior Designers by Country & Town House Magazine.

She has won numerous awards including British Designer of the Decade, House and Garden's 'Design for Positive Change' award, Asia's Most Influential Designer and Great British Brand's Community Award.

== Personal life ==
While Pooley is known for her public presence in the design world, she prefers to maintain a private personal life. It is known that her home garden is 'one of her happy places,' as well as the family's 'bolthole' in the Lake District, Little Nut Cottage. Her family motto is 'Try and you will succeed.'

Pooley has travelled to 195 countries and summited some of the world's highest mountains.

== Publications ==
In 2017, Pooley published her second book, Journey By Design with the publishing house Assouline. Her first publication was a cookbook called A Taste of My World, with proceeds from sales dedicated to the work of three different charities.
