= Gillian Duffy =

English food writer and editor

Gillian Duffy is an English food writer and editor of New York magazine, and 2015 winner of the James Beard Foundation award for Food Journalism - Visual Storytelling. She was born in Salisbury, England and after living in Weston, Connecticut for some years, moved to Provence, commuting regularly to New York.

Brought up on a Sussex farm, she spent summers in France, and is fluent in French. After Finishing School (The Triangle) in London, she worked in various ad agencies "learning the trade".

She became art buyer for the advertising agency Papert Koenig Lois, and later director of art studio Baird Harris. She married Captain David Duffy, who served in the Honourable Artillery Company, later Royal Artillery, in Germany and travelled extensively to France, Italy, Austria and Denmark. After spending a year in Spain and back in England, she moved with him to the United States in 1978.

She joined New York magazine in 1980 and first covered restaurants and nightlife in the magazine's Cue section. She is now the magazine's culinary editor, and founded and still organizes the "New York Taste" show, as well as "New York Culinary Experience". She appears regularly on television and radio. She has written for other periodicals such as Marie Claire and "Departures" and has written two books: Hors d'Oeuvres, Simple, Stylish, Seasonal and New York Cooks. She is a supporter of the charity City Harvest. In 2015 she was nominated for a James Beard Award for food journalism. Subsequently, she was given the James Beard Award for "Visual Story Telling" in April 2015.
