= Rita Horvath =

Hungarian neurologist and researcher

Rita Horvath is a Hungarian neurologist and researcher. She completed her PhD on mitochondrial disease and research in Munich from 1999 to 2007.

She researches key molecular diseases and their mechanisms, with the aim of developing treatments for patients with rare inherited neurological conditions.

== Research ==
Rita Horvath started her research at Professor Eric Shoubridge's laboratory, where she completed her PhD on mitochondrial disease: a group of medical disorders caused by mutations in mitochondria. Following her PhD, Horvath developed a new service to follow up on patients with inherited peripheral neuropathies to develop treatments for patients with rare neurological conditions.

Horvath was elected a Fellow of the Academy of Medical Sciences in 2023.

== Membership ==
Horvath is a member of Ataxia UK, the Medical Advisory Board and the Society of Neuroscience; she further has research grants from MRC Cellular and Molecular Biology Board Research Grant, for example.

== Publications ==
- Gorman GS, Schaefer AM, Ng Y, Gomez N, Blakely EL, Alston CL, Feeney C, Horvath R, Yu‐Wai‐Man P, Chinnery PF, Taylor RW. Prevalence of nuclear and mitochondrial DNA mutations related to adult mitochondrial disease. Annals of Neurology 2015 May;77(5):753-9. According to Google Scholar, it has been cited 567 times.
- Horvath R, Hudson G, Ferrari G, Fütterer N, Ahola S, Lamantea E, Prokisch H, Lochmüller H, McFarland R, Ramesh V, Klopstock T. Phenotypic spectrum associated with mutations of the mitochondrial polymerase γ gene. Brain'. 2006 Jul 1;129(7):1674-84.According to Google Scholar, this article has been cited 403 times
- Hudson G, Carelli V, Spruijt L, Gerards M, Mowbray C, Achilli A, Pyle A, Elson J, Howell N, La Morgia C, Valentino ML. Clinical expression of Leber hereditary optic neuropathy is affected by the mitochondrial DNA–haplogroup background.The American Journal of Human Genetics. 2007 Aug 1;81(2):228-33. According to Google Scholar, this article has been cited 351 times
