= Jenny Halpern Prince =

British businesswoman

Jenny Halpern Prince MBE (née Halpern) is a British businesswoman.

== Biography ==
Prince was born in Kingston Upon Thames. She is the daughter of Sir Ralph Halpern and Lady (Joan) Halpern.

Prince founded Halpern PR in 1993. Halpern was one of the first agencies in London to create a specialist celebrity and influencer division. Halpern PR was part acquired by WPP in 2014 when Prince sold a percentage of the business to The&Partnership.

Prince was appointed Member of the Order of the British Empire (MBE) in the 2023 Birthday Honours for services to charity, young people and social mobility.
