= Stewart Wingate =

Stewart Wingate is the chief executive of Gatwick Airport. He was born in Bishop Auckland, County Durham, where he left school at 16 to pursue a career in industry at Black+Decker. During his time at Black+Decker he attended university, graduating from Northumbria University with a degree in electrical and electronic engineering, and then from Newcastle University with an MBA.

After periods in Germany and the Czech Republic he left Black+Decker and joined Glasgow Airport as operations director followed by stints as chief executive of Budapest Airport and in 2007, managing director of Stansted Airport, before taking over at Gatwick in 2009.
