= Johnny Ingebrigtsen =

Norwegian politician (born 1959)

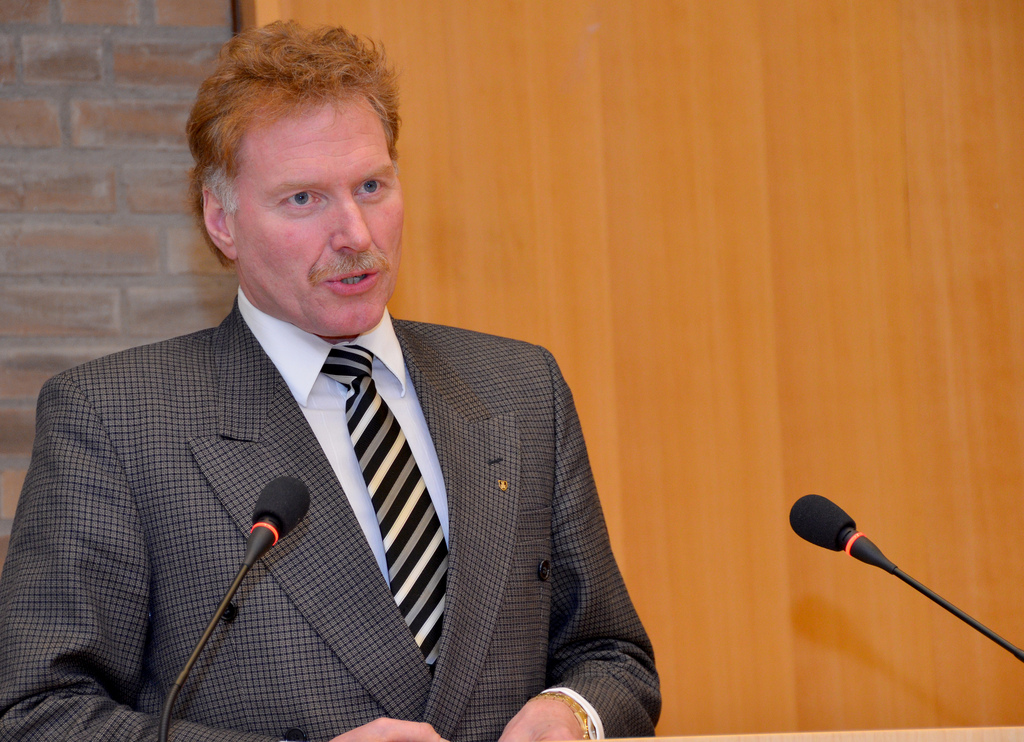
Johnny Ingebrigtsen

Johnny Ingebrigtsen (born 18 September 1959) is a Norwegian politician for the Socialist Left Party.

He served as a deputy representative to the Parliament of Norway from Finnmark during the terms 2005–2009 and 2013–2017. He hails from Nordkapp Municipality and has been a member of the county council. He has also chaired Finnmark Socialist Left Party.

In 2016 he came out in support of Brexit.
