= Jardine Lloyd Thompson =

British financial services company

Jardine Lloyd Thompson Group plc
- Type: Public limited company
- Traded as: LSE: JLT
- Industry: Insurance broker
- Founded: 1997
- Defunct: 1 April 2019; 7 years ago
- Fate: Acquired by Marsh McLennan
- Headquarters: London, England, U.K.
- Area served: Worldwide
- Key people: Geoffrey Howe, Chairman; Dominic Burke, CEO
- Services: Insurance Brokerage; Employee Benefits; Risk Management
- Revenue: £1,438.4 million (2018)
- Operating income: £254.1 million (2018)
- Net income: £54.3 million (2018)
- Number of employees: 10,453 (2018)

Jardine Lloyd Thompson Group plc, also known as JLT Group or simply JLT, was a British multinational corporation that had its headquarters in London, England. It provided insurance, reinsurance, employment benefits advice and brokerage services. It was a constituent of the FTSE 250 Index until it was acquired by Marsh McLennan in April 2019.

== History ==
The company was established as a division of Jardine Matheson in 1972. In 1991, Jardine Insurance Brokers was first listed on the London Stock Exchange. In 1997, it merged with Lloyd Thompson Group to form Jardine Lloyd Thompson Group. In June 2007, it acquired Pavilion Insurance, and in June 2008, it announced the acquisition of Harman Wicks and Swayne.

In July 2009, the company launched a new brand which removed the names of the firm ("Jardine Lloyd Thompson"), leaving simply the acronym JLT and an evolution of the pyramid device. In December 2009, the company acquired HSBC Actuaries and Consultants, a UK-based employee benefits and actuarial consultancy firm, for a purchase price of £27.25 million. In January 2010, the company acquired the Iimia Wealth Management (IWM) division of Midas Capital for a cash consideration of £7.25 million and in October 2010 the company acquired a majority interest in Orbital Corredores de Seguros, the 4th largest insurance broker in Chile via acquisition of a majority stake in its holding company Alta SA.

In May 2012, the company acquired Towner Management Group's Barbados business and operations. Towner's US arm, Towner Management Group US, also entered into a joint venture with the JLT Group, resulting in Towner rebranding as JLT Towner. In October 2012 the company acquired Alexander Forbes Consultants and Actuaries for a purchase price of £17 million. In February 2013, the company acquired Insfield Insurance Brokers Sdn Bhd in Malaysia and in May 2013 the company acquired PT GESA Assistance (GESA) and PT Global Asistensi Manajemen Indonesia (GAMI), two Indonesian healthcare management and third party administration service providers, combining them to form PT JLT GESA.

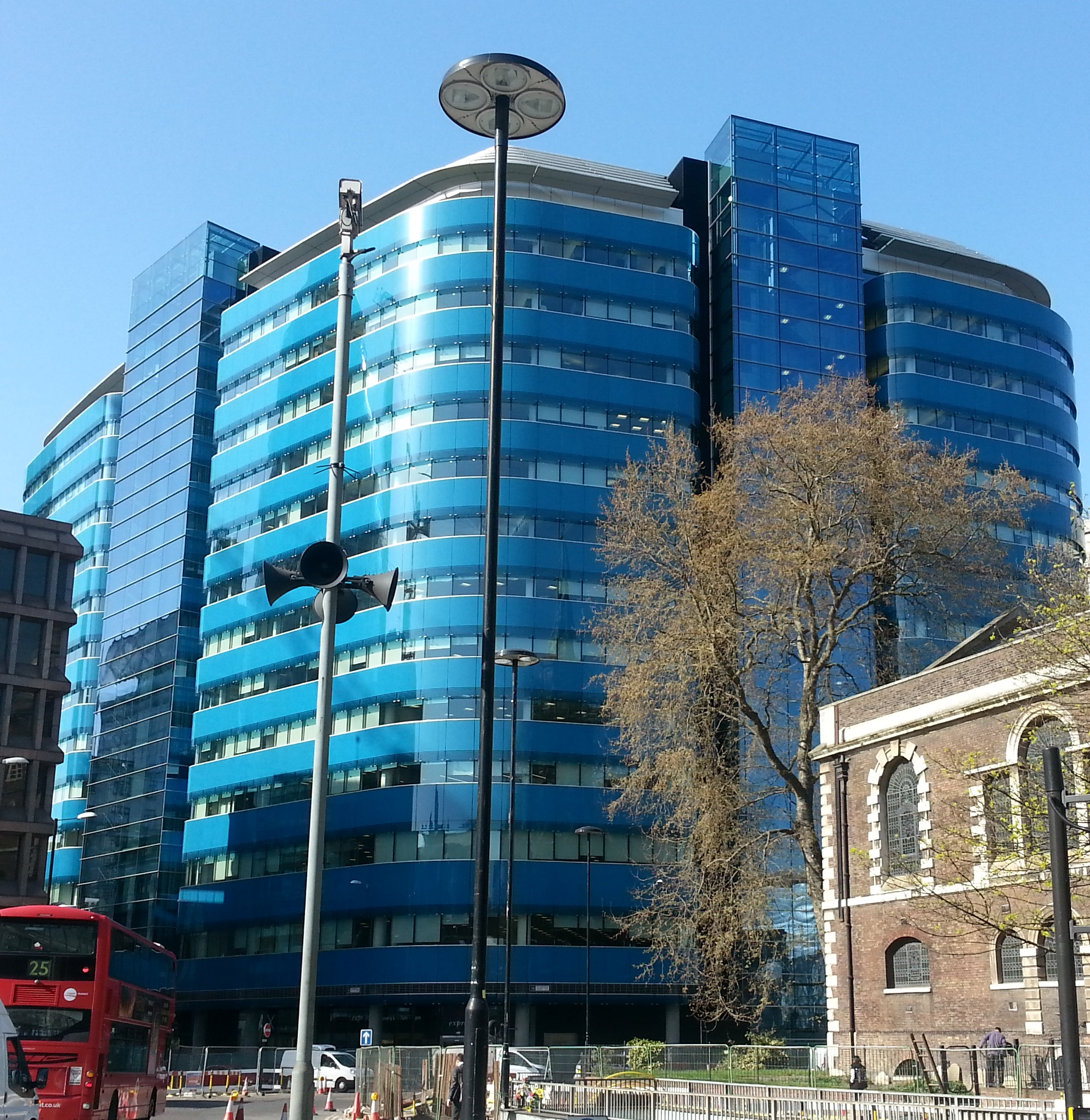
St Botolph Building in London, the headquarters of Jardine Lloyd Thompson

Then in September 2013, the company bought Towers Watson's reinsurance brokerage business and in August 2014 it announced that JLT Specialty and Lloyd & Partners would merge and that there would be an expansion of the company's US capabilities. In November 2016 it announced the disposal of Thistle, an underwriting arm.

In 2015, the Court of Appeal of England and Wales held that global insurance brokers Willis Group were entitled to an interim injunction to prevent JLT from unfairly recruiting its remaining staff. More than 20 employees, including nearly all senior staff in one department, had left Willis to work for JLT.

In September 2018 the company agreed to accept an offer from Marsh McLennan, valuing the company at £4.3 billion. The transaction was completed on 1 April 2019.

== Operations ==
The company has operations organised as follows:

- Risk and insurance
  - Advice and consultancy
  - Captive management
- Employee benefits
  - Pension and retirement services
  - Health, risk and benefits
  - Investment services
  - Wealth management
