= Richard Jackson (biochemist) =

British biochemist

Richard Jackson is a biochemist and cell biologist. He is emeritus Professor of RNA Biochemistry in the Department of Biochemistry at the University of Cambridge. In 2006, Jackson was elected a Fellow of the Royal Society. Jackson's main contributions to cell biology concern the translation of a cell's genetic instruction by ribosomes into proteins, utilizing messenger RNA.
