= Niall Wass =

British business executive

- Born: 1969 (age 56–57)
- Occupations: Senior vice president, Uber (EMEA and Asia Pacific regions)

Niall Fraser Wass (born 1969) is the senior vice president of Uber's Europe, Middle East and Africa, and Asia Pacific regions. He is also a director of Uber B.V., Uber's international presence in the Netherlands, and the former Chief Executive of the British payday loan company Wonga.com. Before Wonga, Wass was chief commercial officer at Betfair. Wass has an MBA from INSEAD.

== Early career ==
During Wass' early career, he was a deal executive at Brait Private Equity and spent six years consulting at Accenture.

== Wonga.com ==
Wass joined Wonga as chief operating officer (COO) in 2012 after failing to secure the chief executive job at Betfair, where he had been chief commercial officer for eight years. He became chief executive for Wonga in November 2013 but he left the company in May 2014 after six months in that position. As COO, he was responsible for the company's move into new products, like business loans, as well as its international expansion.

Wass was one of the Wonga executives believed to be based in Geneva in connection with the use of the Swiss registered firm WDFC SA to process credit applications on behalf of Wonga.

== Uber ==
In 2014, Wass moved to Switzerland to join Uber as senior vice president for the company's Europe, Middle East and Africa and Asia Pacific regions. He is tasked with aiding the company's international expansion, and directing Uber BV, the company's headquarters in the Netherlands.
