= Dominic Burke (businessman) =

British businessman

- Born: Dominic James Burke; September 1958 (age 67); Liverpool, England
- Education: St Mary's College, Colwyn Bay; University of York
- Occupation: Insurance broker
- Title: CEO, Jardine Lloyd Thompson

Dominic James Burke (born September 1958) is a British businessman, and the chief executive officer (CEO) of Jardine Lloyd Thompson, the British multinational insurance broker since December 2005, and the world's fifth largest.

Burke was born in September 1958, and raised in Liverpool, and educated at St Mary's College, Colwyn Bay, and the University of York where he received a bachelor's degree in politics and economics.

Burke owns a stud farm and is deputy chairman of Newbury Racecourse.
