= F & C Investment Trust =

British investment trust

F & C Investment Trust plc

- Registered office above Cannon Street station, London
- Type: Public
- Traded as: LSE: FCIT; NZX: FCT; FTSE 100 component
- Industry: Investment management
- Founded: 1868; 158 years ago
- Headquarters: London, England
- Key people: Beatrice Hollond (Chair); Paul Niven (Fund manager)
- Revenue: ▲£113.2 million (2025)
- Operating income: ▲£103.3 million (2025)
- Net income: ▲£86.2 million (2025)
- Website: www.fandc.com

F & C Investment Trust, formerly Foreign & Colonial Investment Trust, is a publicly traded investment trust. It is listed on the London Stock Exchange and is a constituent of the FTSE 100 Index; it is also listed on the New Zealand Exchange.

== History ==
The company was founded by Philip Rose, who also founded the Royal Brompton Hospital, in 1868 as The Foreign & Colonial Government Trust: it was the first collective investment scheme in the world and specialised in investing in Government bonds.

In 1891 it changed its name to The Foreign & Colonial Investment Trust: it first started investing in equities in 1925.

In 1981, the company launched Graphite Capital, a leading UK private equity firm.

The company shortened its name from The Foreign & Colonial Investment Trust to F & C Investment Trust in 2018.

== Operations ==
The company is managed by Paul Niven of Columbia Threadneedle Investments. The current chair is Beatrice Hollond.
