= George Iacobescu =

Romanian-born British businessman

Sir George Iacobescu CBE
- Born: 9 November 1945 (age 80); Bucharest, Romania
- Citizenship: Romanian; British; Canadian
- Occupations: Former chairman and CEO, Canary Wharf Group
- Children: 1

Sir George Iacobescu CBE (born 9 November 1945) is the former chairman and chief executive officer (CEO) of Canary Wharf Group, the London-based owners and developers of the Canary Wharf estate in East London. His successor, Shobi Khan, now runs the group and Sir George chairs the board. He is one of the most successful Romanian-born businessmen. He is the only Romanian-born person to date to receive a substantive British knighthood.

== Early life ==
Iacobescu was born and raised in Communist Romania. His father was a haematologist and his grandfather was a lawyer and newspaper publisher. After graduating from the Cantemir High School in Bucharest, Iacobescu studied civil and industrial engineering at the Technical University of Civil Engineering of Bucharest.

== Career ==
After graduating, he worked as a structural engineer in Romania; his first job was designing pump stations for a state-run business. He was determined to leave the country, then under the control of Nicolae Ceaușescu's Communist Party, and so in 1975 Iacobescu used contacts in the West to escape to Montreal, Quebec, Canada. He was forced to leave his fiancée, Gabriela, behind, and later lobbied for her to be allowed to join him, which she did in 1977.

On arrival in Canada he started in the property industry, and from 1975 to 1978, was construction director of Homeco Investments, a German-Canadian joint venture in Montreal and Toronto working on landmark buildings throughout North America. After moving to Toronto, Iacobescu worked for the Olympia & York company as an engineer. Following this, he worked as construction manager and then vice-president of Olympia & York from 1978 to 1987 working on many large construction projects, including the construction of the World Financial Centre, 4m sq ft headquarters of Merrill Lynch, the Olympia Centre in Chicago, and the construction of Granicor, in Quebec.

In 1988, Iacobescu moved to London as senior vice-president of Olympia & York, to oversee the construction budget and delivery of the Canary Wharf project. He stayed with the project when Olympia & York went into administration in 1991, working as Construction Director. He became Deputy Chief executive of the Canary Wharf Group when it was formed in 1995, and Chief Executive in March 1997.

In June 2011, Iacobescu was also appointed chairman of the Canary Wharf Group replacing Sir Martin Jacomb who retired; he holds both chairman and CEO positions. During his time at Canary Wharf, Iacobescu has participated in the development and construction of more than 30 buildings.

Iacobescu was appointed Commander of the Order of the British Empire (CBE) in the 2003 Birthday Honours for services to regeneration and inward investment Iacobescu was a member of the Board of Trustees of the British Museum. from 2007–2015.

In June 2011, 10 Downing Street announced that the Prime Minister would be re-appointing him to this post for a period of four years from 1 July 2011. In addition to this role he is Vice-Patron of the Royal British Society of Sculptors, a Patron of Jewish Care and the Community Safety Trust, and was founding Co-Chairman of Teach First.

He is a former director of London First, and on the advisory board of the financial services organisation TheCityUK. In 2016 he was appointed a member of the Government's Thames Estuary Commission chaired by Michael Heseltine. He is a member of the Development Board of Chelsea and Westminster Hospital, the Council of the Royal College of Music, and the Real Estate Advisory Board of the Financial Times. In 2021, he was recognised in the New London Awards as 'New Londoner of the Year'.

In August 2019, Iacobescu announced he would step down as CEO of Canary Wharf Group and take up the role of executive chairman. He stepped back from the executive role and became non-executive chairman in June 2021. In June 2024, Nigel Wilson succeeded him as non-executive chairman.

== Honours ==
On 31 December 2011, he was knighted for services to charity, community and the financial services industry. Although he is the third Romanian-born person to be knighted (after Elie Wiesel who received an honorary knighthood, and British Army general Roy Redgrave whose mother was Romanian and who was born in Bucharest), he was the first to receive a full British knighthood having been born and educated in Romania and later becoming a British citizen.

Iacobescu has also been awarded three of Romania's national honours - Commander of the Order of the Star of Romania, Commander of the Order For Merit and Commander of the Order of the Crown of Romania.

== Personal life ==
Iacobescu is married to Gabriela, Lady Iacobescu, and the father of one daughter, Julie. He speaks Romanian, English and French fluently.
