= Scott Fletcher (entrepreneur) =

British businessman (born 1973)

Scott Fletcher MBE
- Born: 23 August 1973 (age 52); Hale, Greater Manchester, England
- Occupation: Entrepreneur
- Children: 3
- Website: www.godeltech.com

Scott Jonathan Fletcher MBE (born 23 August 1973) is an English entrepreneur.

In July 2008, Fletcher was named Entrepreneur of the Year for the North West at the National Business Awards. He personally donated £10,000 in ANS’ name to fund the first prize in the 'New East Manchester Enterprize Competition'. Their business advice service helped set up 42 new companies in 2007. He is also active within the local community, having previously sat on the board of FC United of Manchester and as a Governor of a local school, Manchester Academy. In April 2009, Fletcher was lauded for intervening to save an artist's home from repossession, offering to pay the outstanding and future mortgage payments.
