= The Mix (charity) =

British charity supporting young people

- Website: www.themix.org.uk

The Mix is a charity based in the UK, which works with people under the age of 25 and offers support through a range of channels, including a free helpline and chat service, articles and peer-to-peer community chats. Young people have a say in what the charity supports and advocates for, and it provides volunteering and training opportunities.

== History ==
Two charities supporting young people, YouthNet (founded 1995) and Get Connected (founded 1991), merged in March 2016. YouthNet offered online support and counselling, while Get Connected maintained a telephone counselling service. Both services remain part of The Mix's offering. The official name of the company and charity is "YouthNet UK (trading as 'The Mix')".

In August 2024, the charity merged with another young people's charity, Mental Health Innovations.

=== Get Connected UK ===
Get Connected UK was a support service for under-25s in the United Kingdom. Young people could contact the helpline by email, text message or web chat. in confidence about any problem, and a trained volunteer would find them the most appropriate help using a directory of over 10,000 services around the country. The charity was in partnership with Carphone Warehouse from its early days.

Get Connected was established in 1999 by a partnership between the Suzy Lamplugh Trust and British Transport Police, with support from Railway Children. Diana Lamplugh wanted to provide help to young people to young people under 25 who had run away from home or been thrown out. Get Connected’s role was to put these young people in touch, free of charge, with whatever service they needed. Get Connected said that its establishing principle was to empower the young person to make their own decision about the help they need, with the role of Get Connected that of a gateway for a young person on the street to access any help they might need. Get Connected developed beyond the initial remit, to help any young person under 25.

==== Organisation ====
Get Connected is made up of a mixture of paid staff and volunteers. The CEO of Get Connected is Jessica Taplin. Andrew Harrison was a trustee for the charity.

==== Fundraising ====
Get Connected raises funds through event fundraising, corporate partnerships, and individual giving. The largest fundraising event is the annual auction with The Carphone Warehouse. Other events include quiz nights, comedy nights, runs, skydiving, trekking, cycles and other activities. In 2000, Get Connected became an independent charity and in 2001, joined The Carphone Warehouse in a partnership that continues today. The Carphone Warehouse supplied Get Connected with office and helpline equipment and helped to ensure that it is free to call from all landline and mobile phones. This partnership won the Charity Times Corporate Partnership Award in 2003 and the Voluntary Sector Excellence Award for Corporate Partnership in 2006.

In 2003, Get Connected developed an email service in order to make their help more accessible to young people with speaking or hearing impairments. One-to-one help via live webchat was launched in 2006 and won the ICT Hub Award for Delivering Social and Environmental Benefits in 2007.

Another corporate partnership is with Merrill Lynch. Other corporate supporters, such as The Finsbury Group, Eatsleepthink Design and HH Associates, help by either pro bono services or gifts in kind, such as printing and design, media space and online coverage. Get Connected and Eatsleepthink Design won a Corporate Community Involvement Award in 2008. Get Connected also receives support from corporate foundations, including Vodafone UK Foundation, Lloyds TSB Foundations and KPMG Foundation, and trusts, such as Children in Need, The Dulverton Trust, The Sylvia Adams Charitable Trust, Volant Charitable Trust, and Help a London Child. Other supporters of Get Connected include Girls Get Connected, a women’s networking initiative. Other supporters include Get Connected’s “Best Friend” Daniel Radcliffe.

In 2011 Carphone Warehouse said that they were aiming to raise £100k for Get Connected that year.

== Core services ==
The Mix offers all of its services entirely through various online channels. Their services include:

- Article content
- Video content
- A free and anonymised helpline (4 pm to 11 pm every day)
- Crisis messenger
- Community forums (peer-to-peer support)
- Email
- Group chats
- Counselling (free, instigated by self-referrals)

== Apps and tools ==
"Stressheads" is an app available on Android and iOS devices and via web browsers, intended as a distraction tool for young people. It was co-developed by a group of young volunteers, YouthNet (now The Mix) and Neon Tribe. It was supported by Capital One. "Stepfinder" is a mobile app for iOS devices that helps young people find the nearest support service. The app was developed with Scramboo.

"Let's Talk Consent Tool" is a web app that guides users through a series of questions to help them understand if they are legally allowed to have sex with someone.

== Youth research and insights ==
To develop a better understanding of young people and respond to their needs, The Mix develops many of its services in consultation with young people - through co-creation sessions. The Mix has also conducted several research studies to better understand young people, their behaviour, the challenges they face and the lives they lead. These include:

- Youth Employability: Pining Down the Future of Digital Badging (2017) – A report that concluded a two-year project. The aim was to improve the employability of young people in the UK and Denmark by developing informal online learning opportunities that can be recognised with a digital badge that is transferable across Europe. The project was funded by the European Union through the Erasmus+ programme and implemented by The Mix and the Centre for Digital Youth Care (CDYC).
- YouthLabs – Young People’s on-going relationship with social media (2015) – An ethnographic research project created by YouthNet (now The Mix) and DigitasLBi. It was designed to capture the voices, opinions and concerns of young people engaging with social media in the UK.
- Connected Generation report (2015) – Get Connected (now The Mix) surveyed 5,000 children and young people under 25 across the UK about the problems they face in the modern world, as well as how well they feel supported and how they prefer to seek help when they have a personal problem.
- Connecting the dots ( 2014) – YouthNet conducted a three-month, collaborative research project with employers, sector colleagues working in employability and young people to explore the role that digital support can play in a young person's journey into work.
- Hidden homelessness in young people (2013) – A research project that looked at how young people end up homeless. YouthNet (now The Mix) led a six-month collaborative research project with leading housing experts and young people to explore the role digital support can play in supporting young people experiencing homelessness.
- Supporting young people through mobile technology (2013) – This study has identified insights and trends in the way young people seek help in the mobile environment. It illustrates YouthNet's (now The Mix) innovative approach to supporting them.

== Organisation ==
The Mix is made up of a mixture of paid staff and volunteers. It is one of eight charity partners working with the Royal Foundation of the Duke and Duchess of Cambridge and the Duke and Duchess of Sussex to deliver Heads Together, a national campaign to tackle mental health stigma. It works with several other organisations, including CentrePoint, to provide support services for young people.

The CEO is Chris Martin.
