= David Ross, Baron Ross of Nevill Holt =

English businessman

The Right Honourable The Lord Ross of Nevill Holt
- Born: David Peter John Ross; 10 July 1965 (age 61); Grimsby, England
- Education: Uppingham School
- Alma mater: University of Nottingham
- Occupation: Businessman
- Years active: 1988–present
- Known for: Co-founder of Carphone Warehouse
- Children: 1 son
- Relatives: Carl Ross (grandfather)

Member of the House of Lords
- Lord Temporal
- Life peerage 25 August 2026
- Website: www.davidpeterjohnross.com

David Peter John Ross, Baron Ross of Nevill Holt (born 10 July 1965) is an English millionaire businessman, and one of the co-founders (with Charles Dunstone and Guy Johnson) of Carphone Warehouse. At the peak of his business interests in 2008, Ross was one of the 100 richest people in the United Kingdom. In 2008, Forbes ranked him #843 in the world's richest billionaires; his net worth was estimated at US$1.4 billion. In April 2015, The Sunday Times estimated his net worth at £1.0 billion. In the 2020 edition of the Sunday Times Rich List, his net worth was estimated at £642 million, a £26 million decrease from the previous year.

== Early life ==
Ross was born on 10 July 1965. He is a grandson of Carl Ross, who created one of the UK's largest commercial fishing firms from the family business, which eventually became Ross Group, and took over the Great Grimsby Coal, Salt and Tanning Company (known as Cosalt), which was founded in 1873 as a co-operative that supplied fishing fleets. Both businesses were listed on the London Stock Exchange.

Ross was educated at Uppingham School. At the age of 16, his father sent him to work on a building site in Algeria, which he later described: "It was a defining moment because it was so bad I had to get away from it and be able to control my destiny". He graduated with a BA degree in law from the University of Nottingham and worked at Arthur Andersen from 1988, qualifying as a chartered accountant in 1991.

== Business activities ==
=== Carphone Warehouse ===
Ross had become friends with Charles Dunstone while at Uppingham. Dunstone went on to found Carphone Warehouse from a flat in Marylebone Road, London, using £6000 of his savings. Two years later, he asked Ross to join the business as finance director. (Note: Some sources say that Ross and Dunstone jointly founded the Carphone Warehouse business in 1989, and others that the pair co-founded it in 1991. There are also sources that say the initial funding of £6000 came jointly, rather than just from Dunstone.) Four years later, the business had twenty stores and thereafter continued to grow rapidly through a process of both acquisition and internal development.

While Dunstone became the public face of Carphone Warehouse, Ross (described by Dunstone as his "secret weapon"), developed and drove the high-street retail footprint of the company by buying Tandy in the UK, and developing markets in Europe and the United States. The business also expanded into other telecommunications areas, establishing the TalkTalk ISP in 2003 and taking over other providers such as AOL. When Ross assisted the IPO of Carphone Warehouse in 2000, the company had been so successful that the partners had not needed to borrow or involve outsiders: Dunstone owned half, Ross a third, and Guy Johnson most of the rest.

Ross was finance director from 1991 until 1996 and then joint-chief operating officer of the company until 2003. He started to reduce his role from 2003, was appointed deputy chairman in July 2005 and by 2008 was a non-executive director. (Note: Unlike The Daily Telegraph, Debrett's says was non-executive deputy chairman from 2003 to 2008.)

The successful involvement of Ross in Carphone Warehouse created a demand for his services at other businesses. He was the chairman of National Express from 2001 (Note: Some sources say Ross was chairman of National Express from 2004.) and also had directorships of several other companies, including the publishing and newspaper group Trinity Mirror, Big Yellow Storage and Frontiers Capital.

=== Kandahar Real Estate ===
A private investment business called Kandahar had been formed by Ross, comprising a team that had gained much experience of the UK high street property market as the number of Carphone Warehouse stores had grown. In 2006, Ross set up a commercial property joint venture with the Morgan Stanley investment bank. His 50 per cent investment in the venture, which was known as Kandahar Real Estate Ltd, came from injecting the one-million square foot high-street private property portfolio of Kandahar, while Morgan Stanley injected the newly completed Drake Circus Shopping Centre in Plymouth. The joint venture was worth £500 million but hit problems soon after due to the 2008 financial crisis; in 2007 it had to arrange a £460 million refinancing deal through the HBOS bank.

=== 2008 resignations and aftermath ===
Ross resigned from Carphone Warehouse, National Express and Big Yellow in December 2008 after using a large proportion of his shares in the businesses as collateral for personal loans without informing the companies, which is a breach of stock market rules. Shortly afterwards, the Financial Services Authority (FSA) said that the rules on the issue, governed by the EU Market Abuse Directive, were unclear and inconsistently applied across the European Union. Although noting that the practice was also restricted by disclosure rules of the stock market's Listing Rules, the FSA said that other directors had used their shares in a similar fashion and offered a short amnesty for declarations to be made by any directors who might have engaged in such practices.

The Drake Circus shopping centre, which was the largest asset in the Kandahar portfolio, was sold to British Land in January 2011 for £240m. Other sales followed as the portfolio was divested during the year, including shopping centres in Bishops Stortford, Caterham, Ipswich and Market Harborough.

=== Cosalt ===
Like his grandfather and father before him, Ross was chairman of Cosalt, which by his time had become primarily a group of companies involved in offshore safety. He took on the role in 2007 and had a 12-month break between 2008 and 2009 due to the problems relating to his pledging of shares as collateral, which had included those he held in Cosalt itself. Despite selling its marine division to raise £27 million, the company was in dire financial circumstances by 2011, when Ross held 15 per cent of the shares and had loaned it money. Following a profits warning in October, Ross proposed to turn it into a privately owned business, offering £400,000 to have it delisted from the stock market, where it had had a presence since 1971. Despite doubling his offer and pumping more money into the company through his investment vehicle, disaffected shareholders rejected it. Some individual shareholders tried in December 2012 to have the Takeover Panel and Financial Services Authority investigate Ross amid claims that he had abused his position in an attempt to buy the business cheaply. Ross said that he had acted altruistically and that the company's pension fund liabilities were now twice its value. By that time, trading in shares had been suspended due to a failure to comply with regulatory requirements by April that year. (Note: Regulatory issues arose because the inability to resolve refinancing issues meant that the company did not file accounts for the 2011 financial year. The accounts could not be filed on a going concern basis.)

Unable to obtain funding from existing or new lenders, or by a deal with pension fund trustees, the company was put into administration in February 2013. Ross and two banks were owed £17 million and Ross held 46 per cent of the shares. (Note: Ross had bought more shares in Cosalt as his attempt to privatise the company went on.)

The business had a £50 million pension deficit when it fell into administration. According to Private Eye, after its collapse Ross bought the company's assets at "knockdown prices" and recovered "far more of his money than anyone else." Partners from PricewaterhouseCoopers were joint administrators of the business. Amongst their actions was the subsequent sale of the Ballyclare workwear division to Ross for £5.8 million. They said, "This sale ensured continued trading for the business and continued employment of all the companies' staff ... The alternative offers would have resulted in further insolvencies within the Group which would have resulted in lower realisations and increased costs." In the same year, Ross also acquired Simon Jersey, adding to his workwear portfolio.

The decision of the Insolvency Service not to disqualify directors of Cosalt from holding future office has been questioned in Parliament. Jo Swinson, then a minister, said that "there was insufficient evidence of relevant misconduct for it to be in the public interest to investigate further since the issues raised are unlikely to be viewed by the Court as serious enough". She also said a potential criminal prosecution of the directors for failure to file accounts had been rejected.

=== Other business activities ===
In 2013, Ross resigned as deputy chairman of the Humber Local Enterprise Partnership. He had become involved when Cosalt was investing in the area with proposals for wind-generated energy but the collapse of that company meant that he had little in the way of involvement in local business and was having to spend more of his time elsewhere. The Ballyclare workwear division was based in Barnsley and Stockport, neither of which are in the Humber area.

Ross, who has a strong personal interest in sport, was for some time on the board of Wembley Stadium and, with his friend Gary Lineker, was part of the consortium which rescued Leicester City Football Club from receivership, before it was later sold to Milan Mandarić.

== Other activities ==
=== Politics ===
In 2014 Ross was a member of "The Leader's Group" of the Conservative Party. The group was described by The Independent as "an elite diners' club whose members get frequent access to David Cameron in exchange for donating more than £50,000 a year". In total, he had donated more than £700,000 to the party by February 2020, including £10,000 for Boris Johnson's leadership campaign in 2019. Ross also paid for Johnson's holiday accommodation in Mustique in December 2019. Although Johnson was eventually cleared of any standards breach, both Johnson and Ross were criticised by the Commons Select Committee on Standards in July 2021 for their lack of candour over these arrangements.

Ross was made a Conservative life peer in the July 2026 political peerages. He was created as Baron Ross of Nevill Holt, of Great Grimsby in the County of Lincolnshire on 25 August 2026.

=== Charitable activities and the arts ===
Ross was appointed by Tony Blair to be a trustee of the National Portrait Gallery for an initial four-year term in February 2006. This was to satisfy the Gallery's desire to recruit "a person with senior level of financial, accounting, strategic planning and risk management skills". There were accusations of cronyism later that year when it emerged that the Gallery had commissioned a photographic portrait of Ross, among other telecoms-related subjects, but the Gallery noted that he had not been involved with the organisation at the time of commissioning. During his long tenure as a trustee he became Chair of the Audit and Risk Committee and Chair of the Development Board and he was appointed chairman in 2017. He was reappointed in 2021 and oversaw the Gallery's Inspiring People redevelopment, completed in 2023, towards which he gave £4 million, before his tenure ended in 2025. A 2026 interview in The Times said 'he has great taste...and he has a profound, if quietly stated, belief that he has a duty to give back to society. When I asked him what he is, he replies, “A patriot.” '

In May 2012, Ross participated in "The Dallaglio Flintoff Cycle Slam 2012" charity cycle ride from Olympia, Greece, to Stratford, London, in aid of Andrew Flintoff and Lawrence Dallaglio's respective charities. He hosts the annual Nevill Holt Opera festival.

Ross, brought up in Lincoln, sponsored the David P J Ross Vault at Lincoln Castle, which houses Lincoln Cathedral's copy of the 1215 Magna Carta and the 1217 Charter of the Forest.

In July 2020, The Royal Opera House announced that Ross had been appointed as chair of its Board of Trustees. Ross succeeded Ian Taylor.

=== Education ===
Ross founded the David Ross Foundation in 2006. It believes that "every child and young person has passions and talents" and that its intention is to "help them discover their strengths by offering them a wide range of world class educational opportunities". It has funded the David Ross Education Trust, which operates various academies and at least one free school in England. Its first academy was sponsored in 2007 and, by July 2014, it was running 25 educational establishments in the country. Ross is the chairman of the New Schools Network, a charity which formerly supported free schools.

In 2015, he was made a member of Nottingham University's Council. He had been shortlisted for the role of chairman of Ofsted by an independent panel in 2014 but his involvement went no further due to objections from the Liberal Democrats regarding a potential conflict of interest relating to his past political donations. (Note: There had been speculation that, apart from the issue of political donations, appointing Ross as Ofsted chairman would also create a conflict of interest because of his direct involvement with academies. However, David Hoare, who was eventually selected for the role, also had an involvement but was free of political ties.)

=== Sport ===
After Boris Johnson was elected Mayor of London in May 2008, Ross was his nominee to the board of the London Organising Committee of the 2012 Olympic Games. He resigned from this position December 2008 in the wake of the same event that led to his departure from the board of Carphone Warehouse. Johnson has also appointed Ross to the board of the London Legacy Development Corporation which has responsibility for redevelopment of Olympic Park in Legacy mode and to London United, the body that supported the capital's bid to be host city for the 2018 World Cup.

In 2013, Ross was a member of the Commonwealth Games England board. He is also a non-executive director of the British Olympic Association.

Ross has supported his alma mater, the University of Nottingham, to build a £40 million sports centre in the University Park Campus, named the David Ross Sports Village, which opened in October 2016.

== Personal life ==
Ross has a son with Michelle "Shelley" Ross, a former partner whom he did not marry but who happened to have the same surname. He has also been in relationships with high-profile women such as Saffron Aldridge and Ali Cockayne.

Ross's main residence is the 13th-century, Grade I-listed Nevill Holt estate, near Market Harborough, Leicestershire, on which he has spent millions of pounds. In addition, he has, or has had, homes in Kensington and Mustique, and in Switzerland, where he spent some time as a tax exile. He owned a second country estate, at Brampton Ash in Northamptonshire. His stepsister, Fiona, was murdered there in 2006 and, in 2008, he decided to sell it. He has a reputation for partying and a love of shooting, pursuing the latter interest with people such as Gary Lineker and Richard Branson. In 2007, he bought 4,500 hectares (11,000 acres) of grouse moor in Yorkshire.
