= Geek Squad =

Subsidiary of Best Buy

Geek Squad, Inc.
- Type: Subsidiary
- Industry: Services
- Founded: June 16, 1994; 32 years ago
- Founder: Robert Stephens
- Headquarters: Richfield, Minnesota, U.S.
- Area served: United States; Puerto Rico; Canada; Mexico
- Number of employees: 20,000
- Parent: Best Buy
- Website: bestbuy.com/..

Geek Squad, Inc. is a subsidiary of American and Canadian multinational consumer electronics corporation Best Buy, headquartered in Richfield, Minnesota. The subsidiary was originally an independent company founded by "Chief Inspector" Robert Stephens on June 16, 1994, offering various computer-related services and accessories for residential and commercial clients. In 2002, they merged with Best Buy, retaining Stephens as the primary corporate leadership for the subsidiary.

The Geek Squad provides services in-store, on-site, and over the Internet via remote access, and also provides 24-hour telephone and emergency on-site support. Geek Squad no longer works solely on computer-related devices. It now diagnoses issues in and repairs all consumer electronics, as well as appliances.

== Locations and partnerships ==
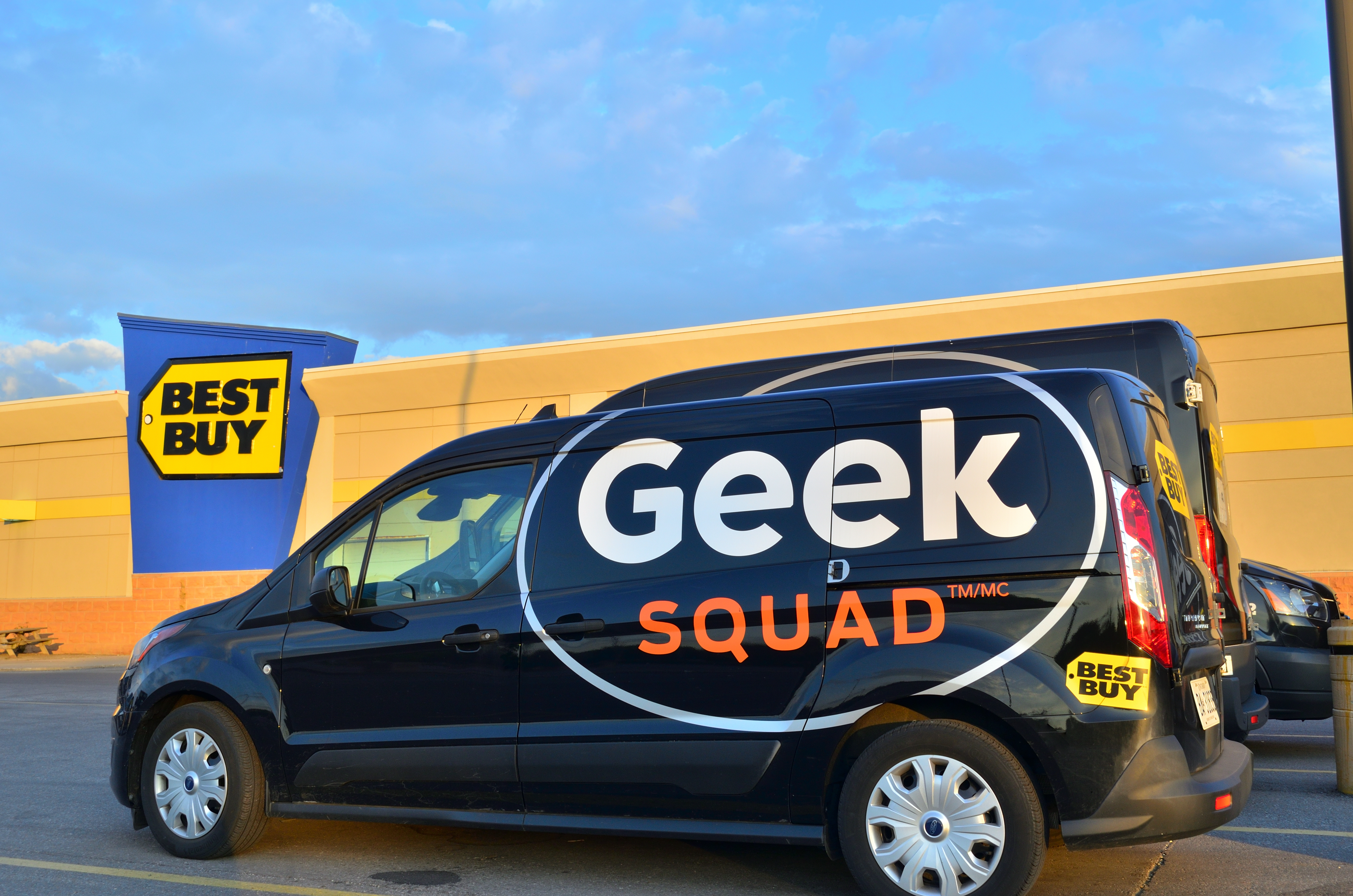
Geek Squad in Canada

Geek Squad service centers are located in most Best Buy stores in the United States, including Puerto Rico, and Canada, providing technical support through in-store consultations, home visits, online assistance, and telephone-based services, subject to availability and fees.

Best Buy terminated its partnership with Office Depot in Orlando, Florida, where Geek Squad precincts were located in ten Office Depot locations. The brand is also located in select FedEx Office locations.

In October 2006, Best Buy was reported that Geek Squad would be launching in the United Kingdom in a joint 50-50 venture with Carphone Warehouse, where today it exists as both an onsite service and a remote repair service, although not under the same name. At its peak, Geek Squad services were available in Greater London, the Home Counties, the South Coast and North West areas of England, with phone and remote support was undertaken from Tulketh Mill in Preston (Lancashire) and repairs completed at a site in Wednesbury (West Midlands). In November 2015 Geek Squad repairs moved to Newark following the merger between Carphone Warehouse and Dixons Retail forming Dixons Carphone (now Currys PLC).

In 2008, Best Buy partnered with online tech support provider SupportSpace to offer remote Virtual Agent services to its clients. SupportSpace was founded in 2006 and provided immediate online tech support services. On July 15, 2013, all Geek Squad business was transferred away from SupportSpace and moved in-house to Geek Squad agents.

In January 2012, following poor financial results, the Best Buy Europe venture was discontinued with Carphone Warehouse purchasing its 50% of the deal back. In the following years the Geek Squad operations in France, Germany, Netherlands, Sweden, Spain and Portugal were slowly wound down with the brand finally ending in Europe with Carphone Warehouse adopting the Team Knowhow brand in 2017.

In 2013, Geek Squad partnered with Atomic Learning, Inc., allowing its tech support subscribers access to a library of over 60,000 tutorial videos for training purposes, as part of their subscription package.

=== Total Services ===
In 2007, Geek Squad officially added Magnolia Home Theater installation teams as well as Best Buy Mobile Installers to the Geek Squad brand. The change was titled, "Total Services" and was aimed towards the combination of major Best Buy services into one cohesive unit. Best Buy mobile installers and Magnolia Home Theater installers have now switched from their previous grey and blue uniforms to grey and orange shirts with grey cargo pants. This change removed all "Magnolia Home Theater Installation" branding and was replaced by "Geek Squad Installation Units" instead. This has now allowed Geek Squad to incorporate home theater installation as one of the in home services offered via telephone. Geek Squad is also now an Apple Authorized Service Provider.

== Staff ==
Older traditional Geek Squad logo from prior to 2016

Geek Squad employees are known as Agents and are assigned titles similar to those used by intelligence agencies – Counter Intelligence Agent (CIA), Deputy of Counter Intelligence (DCI), Double Agent-Covert (DAC), Covert Agent (CA), Special Agent (SA), Deputy Covert Operations (DCO) and Deputy Field Marshal (DFM), to name a few. Unlike most computer repair facilities, Best Buy US does not require any industry certifications for its in-store technicians. However, Best Buy Canada requires at least A+ Certification to work as a CIA. They also require MECP certification for all technical mobile electronics installers. In-Store positions have long since changed, now only consisting of Consultation Agent (CA), Advanced Repair Agent (ARA), Geek Squad Sr (CIA Sr), Services Experience Supervisor, and Services Experience Manager.

=== Uniforms and vehicles ===
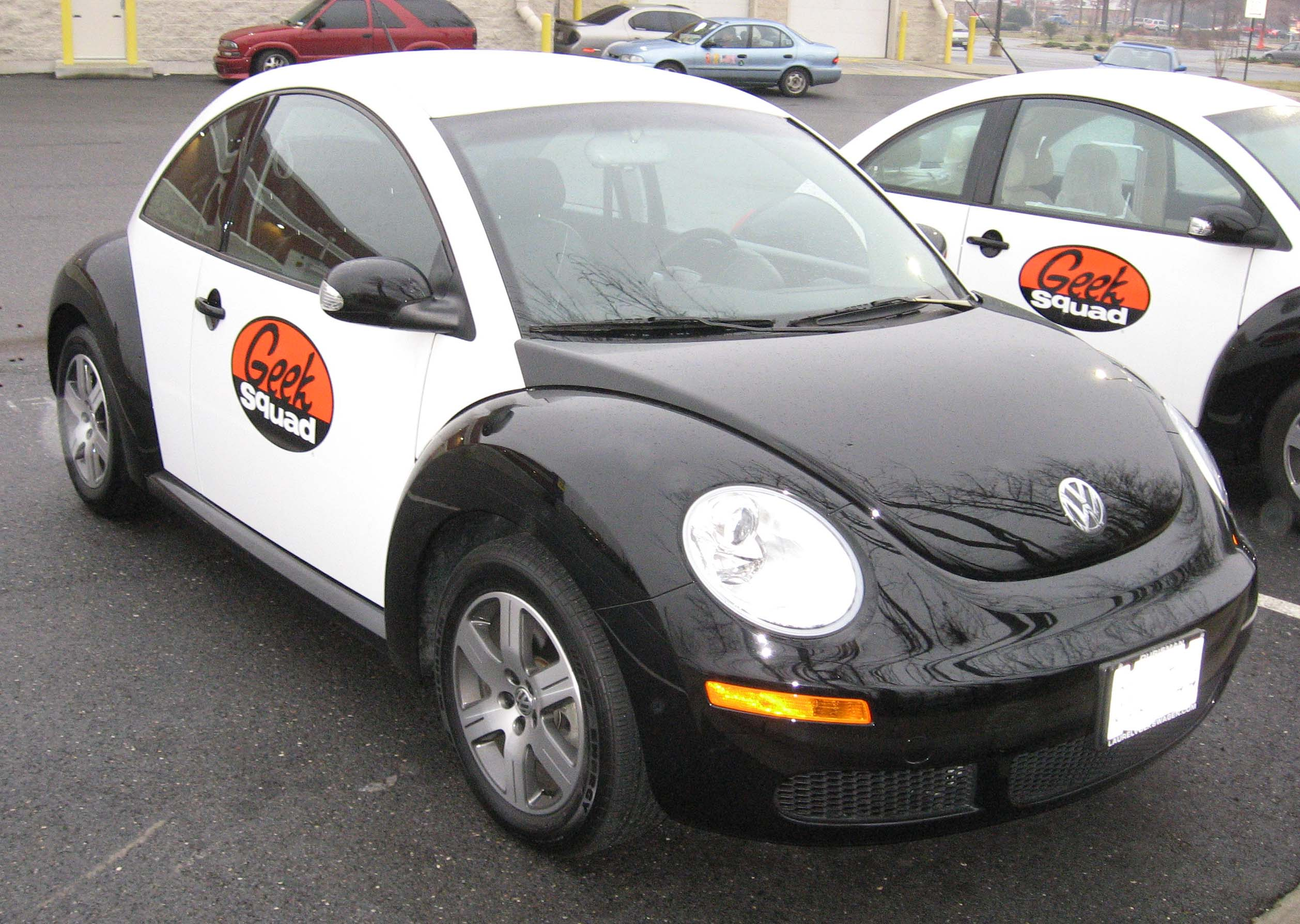
Geekmobile in Maryland

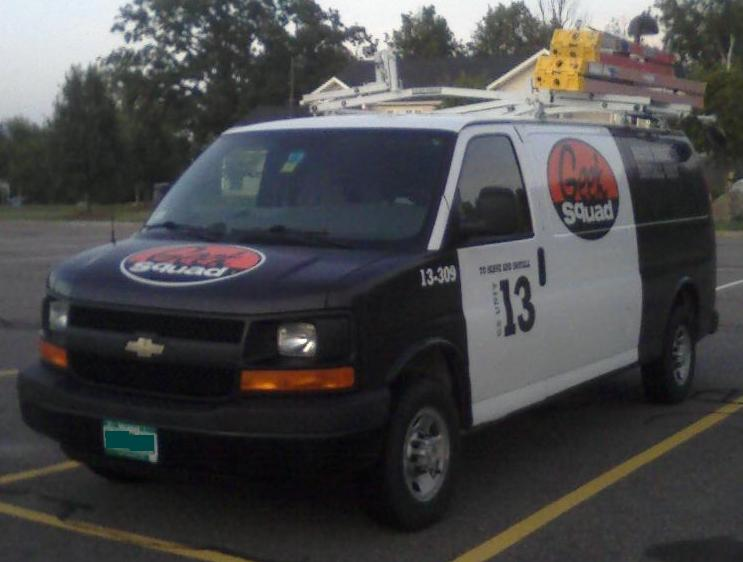
Geek Squad Chevrolet Express in Vermont, which are no longer used

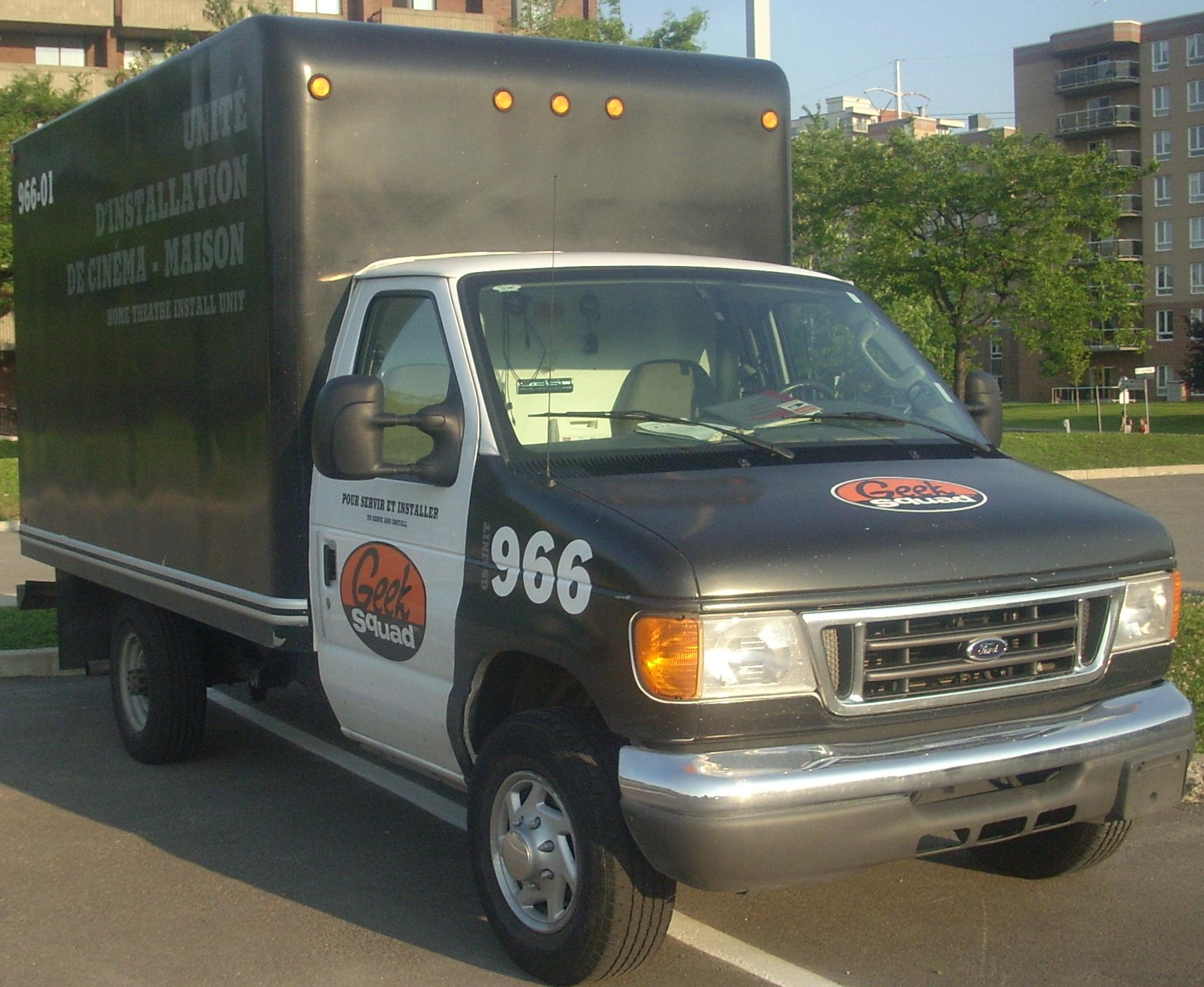
Geek Squad Ford E-350 cutaway in Montreal, Quebec, Canada

In-store PC agents, and in-home PC field agents, wear a white, short-sleeved, pocketless dress shirt. Agents are required to wear a black clip-on tie with the Geek Squad logo pin. Male agents wear black trousers, white socks and black lace-up shoes that used to have the Geek Squad logo on the sole. Female agents may wear either black trousers, white socks, and black shoes; or, a black skirt with hose and black shoes. White and black are the only colors allowed in Geek Squad uniforms. Agents who have served in an eligible capacity within any branch of Geek Squad for eighteen months, or who have held certain positions prior to 2014 including on-site Double Agents, Special Agents, and Deputies of Counter Intelligence carry a metal police-style badge with their Agent Number engraved on it. In October 2019 the Dress Code Policy for Best Buy was updated, with this update an alternate uniform option was introduced for Geek Squad Agents allowing them to wear the black Geek Squad polo along with jeans and sneakers.

The branding of the uniform to include a badge is central to the culture for Geek Squad Agents, including the writing of a 40-page essay, "The Geek Squad Badge", by former/“Sleeper” Double Agent Roman Corrales, Badge #11345. The essay explores history of badges across history, connecting the Roman shield to their evolution into the modern badge worn by many professionals today. The essay has been integrated across much of Geek Squad's employee branding, including being cited in an internal culture manual known as the Little Orange Book.

The Minnesota Historical Society added the official uniform to its permanent collection in 2000.

Geek Squad Autotechs and GSIs (Home Theater Installers) wear a grey button-up work shirt or black short sleeved and collared dress shirt with the Geek Squad logo on the front and optional certification patches on the arms. Matching pants or shorts are worn as well as a bright orange undershirt. These agents also have the option of wearing a grey Geek Squad hat and/or black Geeks Squad nylon jacket.

Prior to 2016, Double Agents and Special Agents drove black-and-white Volkswagen New Beetles (dubbed "Geekmobiles") with an orange-and-black company logo on the door. Geekmobiles in California are all-black with white roof and running boards due to a request by the California Highway Patrol that the vehicles no longer resemble the paint scheme of their police vehicles (a violation of California law). In 2016, Geek Squad began phasing out the New Beetles and replacing them with Toyota Prius Cs.

Geek Squad Agents that leave their roles, are referred to internally, as “Sleeper Agents”- a common quote when saying farewell to an Agent going sleeper is “await the signal”, as a reference to the Bat-Signal from Batman, used to call the superhero in a time of need. The idea is that Geek Squad has always been known to be welcoming of former Agents looking to return for a job, and to wish them luck in their endeavors.

== Geek Squad City ==
Located in Brooks, Kentucky, Geek Squad City is the largest Geek Squad computer repair site at 240,000 square feet.

== Controversy ==
Geek Squad technicians have been caught on numerous occasions searching and copying pornographic content stored on their clients' computers without permission. When asked about the incident, Geek Squad founder Robert Stephens refused to discuss the topic and focused on whether bloggers should be considered true journalists.

At least one former Geek Squad employee had come forward with allegations that the practice of surreptitiously searching for pornography on their clients' computers is not restricted to isolated employees, but is often shared with management.

In 2002, during a spate of legal threats and challenges to competitors with "geek" in their names, Geek Squad attempted to block the trademark registration of New England area competitor Geek Housecalls claiming that it violated their trademarks. When Geek Housecalls refused to budge, Geek Squad filed civil suit. After two years of wrangling, Geek Squad and Geek Housecalls arrived at an out-of-court settlement, the details of which cannot be disclosed according to the terms of the settlement except to state that Geek Housecalls retained its name.

In 2006, Geek Squad was sued for allegedly using unauthorized copies of Winternals' Emergency Repair Disk Commander. The lawsuit filed by Austin-based Winternals claims that employees of Geek Squad have continued using the unlicensed versions of the software after the commercial licensing agreement broke off. Best Buy and Geek Squad were accused of copyright infringement, circumvention of copyright infringement systems, and misappropriation of trade secrets. A settlement was eventually reached, and Winternals created a three-year agreement in place with Best Buy, allowing Geek Squad employees to lawfully use their licensed programs, including the ERD Commander.

In 2007, Best Buy was hit with a civil lawsuit by Sarah Vasquez alleging that Geek Squad technician Hao Kuo Chi had secretly taped her showering with a cellular phone camera he hid behind her sink. Vasquez sought compensation from Best Buy based on claims of negligent misrepresentation and hiring, invasion of privacy and intentional infliction of emotional stress. On top of the civil suit, Hao was also facing criminal charges including two counts of invasion of privacy and one count of child molestation.

In 2010, Best Buy issued a trademark infringement cease and desist letter against a priest in Wisconsin for painting "God Squad" on his car.

In 2013, Geek Squad was sued for invasion of privacy and several other civil infractions for allegedly releasing nude images found on a customer's computer. The suit is ongoing. In June 2015, the court denied Best Buy's motions for summary judgment on all claims except the claim for "negligence/wantonness."

On March 7, 2018, NPR reported that "FBI Used Paid Informants On Best Buy's Geek Squad To Flag Child Pornography" according to a document that was released by the Electronic Frontier Foundation.
