= Tristia Harrison =

British businesswoman (born 1973)

Dame Tristia Harrison DBE
- Born: Tristina Adele Clark; 26 February 1973 (age 53)
- Education: Watford Grammar School for Girls; St Albans High School for Girls; University of Kent
- Occupation: Businesswoman
- Title: CEO, TalkTalk Group
- Term: 2017–2024
- Predecessor: Dido Harding
- Successor: James Smith
- Spouse: Andrew Harrison
- Children: 2

Dame Tristina Adele Harrison DBE (née Clark; born 26 February 1973), known as Tristia Harrison, is a British businesswoman, and was the CEO of TalkTalk Group from May 2017 to August 2024.

== Early life ==
She was born Tristina Adele Clark, and grew up in Radlett. She was educated at Watford Grammar School for Girls and St Albans High School for Girls. She studied history at the University of Kent, Canterbury.

== Career ==
Harrison joined TalkTalk in 2010. She was marketing director of Carphone Warehouse, and managing director of TalkTalk Consumer from 2014, before becoming CEO of TalkTalk Group in 2017. She was succeeded as CEO by James Smith at the end of August 2024. She has been a director since 2014. Harrison was a trustee of Comic Relief for almost a decade and the national charity Ambitious about Autism. In 2020, she was named chair of trustees for the national homeless charity, Crisis,

== Personal life ==
She is married to Andrew Harrison, former CEO of Carphone Warehouse. They have two sons and live in west London.

== Honours and awards ==
She received an honorary degree from the University of Salford in 2022.

Harrison was appointed Dame Commander of the Order of the British Empire (DBE) in the 2024 New Year Honours for services to telecommunications.
