= Carl Ross =

British businessman

Carl Ross (29 July 1901 – 9 January 1986) was a fishery entrepreneur and architect of the forerunner company to Young's Bluecrest, the UK's largest frozen fish producer.

== Biography ==
Carl (John) Ross was the fourth of six children of Thomas Ross, founder of a fish merchanting firm of the same name. Carl Ross was educated at Culford School (where he was a county hockey player) and served briefly in the Royal Navy before joining the family business in 1918 when he was demobilized. Thomas retired early in 1928 upon which Carl took control and introduced new ideas such as the import of frozen halibut and salmon from North America, resulting in a steady period of expansion after Second World War.

Ross married Elsie Hartley, daughter of a Blackburn cotton salesman in 1928. They had two sons and two daughters. He obtained a pilot's licence and played an active role in the Royal Air Force Volunteer Reserve cadet force during the Second World War. He was president of the Fishing Industry Sports Association and a generous contributor to charity. He was president of the Grimsby Conservative Association for some twenty-five years from 1954.

His grandson is David Ross, the co-founder of the mobile phone retailer Carphone Warehouse with an estimated wealth of £1bn in 2015.

== Ross Group ==
While Ross was developing his fish merchanting activities, he recognised that the future of the fishing industry lay in integrating fish catching, processing, and merchanting. He built the first diesel trawlers in the mid-1930s. He purchased nine more vessels in 1943 and acquired a majority shareholding in Trawlers Grimsby Ltd, in 1944. This was the foundation-stone of what became the Ross Group.

According to The Times, despite having had no formal finance or accountancy training, Ross demonstrated a great talent for reading and understanding figures. An extensive series of take-overs of companies in the fishing industry, including major catching and processing companies in Hull, gave the Ross Group a dominant situation on the Humber.

In the early 1950s, Carl Ross extended the frozen fish business to become Ross Foods and acquired Youngs shellfish company. In 1956 Ross secured twenty North Sea skippers through acquisition, and built up a Bird and Cat class North Sea and Middle Water trawler enterprise which went on to acquire the Cochrane yards at Selby. At its peak, the Ross Group owned the largest fishing fleet in Europe.

Carl Ross established Ross Poultry (1961), which played a major role in the industrialisation of the British poultry industry and became the largest chicken producer in Europe; The only set-back Carl Ross encountered was in 1966, when the Monopolies Commission refused to allow his bid for Associated Fisheries Ltd, the other major company in the industry.

The Ross group acquired Great Grimsby Coal, Salt and Tanning Company (Cosalt), a firm founded in 1873 as a cooperative that sold supplies needed to run a fishing fleet. The business was listed on the London Stock Exchange in 1971.

Carl Ross parted company with the Ross Group after a boardroom struggle in the late 1960s, which culminated in the take-over of the company by Imperial Group Ltd in 1970.

== Sources ==
- Competition Commission report on the Ross Group
- National Maritime Museum record of the flag of the Ross Group trawlers
- Matthew, H.C.G. (2004). Oxford Dictionary of National Biography. Oxford University Press. ISBN 978-0198614111.
