= MECP =

MECP may refer to

- Mobile Electronic Certified Professional, a certification available in the United States
- Myanmar Eye Care Project, a not-for-profit organisation
- MECP2, a gene
  - MECP2 duplication syndrome, a rare disease linked to the gene
- Methylcyclopentadiene, a chemical compound also known as MeCp
- Master Emergency Control Panel
- Ministry of the Environment, Conservation and Parks, a Ministry of the Government of Ontario
