= Rainford High School =

School in Rainford, St Helens, England

Location
- Higher Lane; North-west England; Rainford, Merseyside, WA11 8NY; England; 53.5085°N 2.7841°W

Information
- Former names: Rainford High Technology College, Rainford County Secondary School, Rainford Senior Council School
- Type: Academy
- Motto: Everyone Matters, Everyone Helps, Everyone Succeeds.
- Established: 1940
- Founder: Lord Derby
- Sister school: Up Holland High School
- Local authority: St Helens
- Trust: Everyone Matters Schools Trust
- Department for Education URN: 144327 Tables
- Ofsted: Reports
- Chair of Trustees: Jayne Lloyd
- Head teacher: Ian Young
- Years offered: 7 - 13
- Gender: Coeducational
- Age: 11 to 18
- Enrolment: 1646 (25/26)
- Houses: Compassion, Integrity, Determination, Endeavour and Resilience
- Colours: Red, Green, Blue, Yellow, Orange
- Communities served: St Helens, West Lancashire, Wigan and Kirkby
- Website: http://www.rainford.org.uk/

Rainford High School is a coeducational secondary school and sixth form located in Rainford, Merseyside, England. It first opened in 1940 and continues to serve the communities of St Helens, West Lancashire, Wigan and Kirkby to this day.

The school currently holds a Progress 8 score of 0.03, which is considered to be within the National Average. However, this is based on data from the 2023–24 academic year, as the Department for Education has not released any data for more recent years due to disruption to KS2 SATs examination data caused by the COVID-19 pandemic.

== History ==
Rainford High School opened on 7 August 1940, during World War II, as Rainford Senior Council School, with 127 students, one principal, and three teachers. The school was originally a grammar school.

In 1945 the name was changed to Rainford County Secondary School.

During the 1950s and 1960s, the school had begun to grow in size. By this point, the school had become a Secondary Modern school, entering its pupils for external examinations, including A-Level examinations.

The school became a comprehensive on 7 September 1971, with the old system of grammar schools and secondary modern schools abolished, where the school would choose to adopt the name 'Rainford High School'.

The school received both Technology College and Beacon School status in either the 1999/2000 academic year or the 2000/2001 academic year, and the name was changed to 'Rainford High Technology College'.

The oldest Ofsted record available is from 2004, and it shows that the school was inspected and received a good award. However, following reinspections in 2008 and 2011, the school only received a Satisfactory award.

In 2012, the Principal, Ruth Greenwood was suspended, due to "concerns over the leadership and management of the school". Following this, the Vice Principal, Sam Wells, and the Chair of Governors, John Bromilow, along with principal all resigned from their posts, citing personal reasons. In May 2012, Rainford High School appointed a new principal, Ian Young, who expressed that he wanted to ensure "that the standards in the school reach the highest possible levels of attainment and achievement". Following Ian Young's appointment, the school was reinspected by Ofsted, and the school received Requires Improvement.

The school was rebuilt as part of the UK government's Building Schools for the Future programme, and the site fully opened in September 2013. The site has since been further expanded, when a modular, four-classroom building was added to the site in 2021.

The school was reinspected in 2014, when it received requires improvement again, and would then be reinspected in 2015, where it received a good award, for the first time since 2004.

Previously a community school administered by St Helens Council, in September 2017, Rainford High Technology College converted to academy status, and its name was reverted to Rainford High School. The school is now sponsored by the Everyone Matters Schools Trust.

In 2021, the school was inspected for the first time as an academy by Ofsted, and it continued to hold a good award.

The school was reinspected by Ofsted in 2026 under Ofsted's refined grading system, where the school received 'Expected Standard' in every category.

== Houses ==
The school used to have 4 houses, called Derby, Muncaster, Holland and Lathom. However, in more recent times these houses have not been used.

In 2022, the school brought back the house system. The house names are Compassion, Integrity, Determination, Endeavour and Resilience. The first house event was the 2022 annual sports day in July 2022. In January 2023, the school began to hand out House Badges (to lower school students) and House Lanyards (to staff and sixth form students). There are 5 of these, with different symbols, and colours to match the houses. Each student and member of staff will be randomly placed into one of the five houses.

== Rainford High Sixth Form ==
Rainford High Sixth Form is a sixth form college and the post-16 provision of Rainford High School, located in Rainford, St Helens, Merseyside.

The first A-Level exam to be sat at Rainford was sat in 1962, with the first student to enter University from Rainford in 1966. The current Sixth Form building was completed in 1982 and refurbished in 2011 as part of the Building Schools for the Future programme. During this process, the Sixth Form was moved into temporary accommodation on one of the fields on the school's grounds.

It is currently second in the results table in the St Helens area, behind Carmel College, with an A-Level progress score of -0.26, which is considered to be below the national average.

The college is based in the grounds of Rainford High School, however, the Sixth Form has some specialist facilities, such as a media suite with video editing facilities, and a canteen, however, many of the school's other facilities, such as science laboratories, the auditorium, and the sports hall, are shared with the main school.

Rainford High Sixth Form

Information
- Mottoes: Be Brilliant; Everyone Matters, Everyone Helps, Everyone Succeeds.
- Established: c. 1962
- Years offered: 12-13
- Colors: Blue, Gold, White
- Head of Sixth Form: Mr Thomas Beetles
- Website: https://rainford.org.uk/sixth-form/

== Rainford High Concert Band ==
The school's largest organisation was the Concert Band for brass, woodwind, and percussion players. It was open to students of all ages (including Sixth Form students) and practiced weekly in order to play in local primary schools, and also the main showpiece - the 'Music for a Summer's Evening' concert, usually held in July.

A vocal group often performed in the Summer Concert as well. This group offered musical tuition for guitar, piano, brass, percussion and woodwind in order to promote musicianship amongst its students. Sixth Formers were also involved. The group participated in a regular 'Performance Evening' as well as charity music events, such as for Children in Need 2010.

== Uniform controversy and protests ==
In late 2022, the Senior Leadership Team at Rainford High enforced an existing requirement for pupil's skirts to be 'knee length', as per the uniform policy. The pupils at Rainford refused to follow this rule, and the SLT decided to give the chance for students and staff to come up with a compromise, which was implemented between November 2022 and February half-term. However, due to "a refusal to comply by approximately 45% of the students" the school reverted to the previous requirement for all pupils, with the exception of Year 11 pupils, whose skirts would have to be one finger above the knee.

When pupils returned to the school in February 2023, they were greeted by school staff waiting to check for knee-length skirts, and then sending pupils either into the school to go to form as normal or forcing them to queue up outside the auditorium, where they would then be taken into the auditorium, and would be requested to fix the issue. If the pupil refused to or could not adjust their skirt to an "appropriate length", their parents would be contacted, and they would be issued with a standards (break time) detention, with apparent threats of suspension if the issue was not resolved within a day. However, the school later denied suspending anyone for infringing the school's uniform policy. A petition was created on change.org on the same day, asking for the school to stop "controlling girls' skirts". Within three days, the petition reached over 1,000 signatures.

It was reported that the student body sent out invitations to a protest on the social media apps TikTok and Snapchat, on the next day, 22 February. Videos on TikTok can be seen showing what looks like a sit-in, initially starting in the south block, before moving outside. In some videos, boys can be seen wearing skirts in support of the girls. There were reports of a suspected malicious fire alarm activation causing an evacuation. Students have signalled that they will continue to plan and perform protests over the issue.

The Principal, Ian Young, reports that "The discourse with our young people has been positive and proactive" and that he is "delighted they have spoken with passion on this topic" but that as a school with "consistent standards and expectations" they are limited on what actions they can take.

In response to the protests, on 24 February, a St Helens Council spokesperson reported to the St Helens Star that "the council has been contacted by parents of pupils from Rainford High", and that they "have listened to their concerns" and are "working with the Academy to see how they can build relationships with the pupils, and in particular the girls."

An updated copy of the school's Uniform Policy released in June 2023 neglects to mention any requirements for the length of skirts and it appears that this rule is no longer being enforced by the school.

== School break-in and vandalism ==
On Sunday 26 November 2023 the school announced, via the St Helens Star, its Instagram, and X pages and its website that the school would be closed on the following Monday due to 'a significant amount of damage caused by unidentified individuals' who had broken into the school. A video posted by the Liverpool Echo shows two individuals releasing a fire extinguisher, punching a computer monitor and spilling milk on the carpeted floor in an office inside of the school. Damage to areas of the carpet in the school was significant as an industrial carpet cleaner was needed to help completely clean the carpets.

On the afternoon of Monday 27 November 2023 the school announced that its clean-up operation was well underway and that the staff, along with the wider community, had all helped to get the school functioning again as soon as possible. A GoFundMe fundraiser was also created by members of the community to help raise money for the school.

The break-in was investigated by Merseyside Police. The vandalism was condemned by Councillor Chris Lamb, chair of Rainford Parish Council, and Councillor David Baines, leader of St Helens Council, on X and Facebook.

On 27 November 2023 Merseyside Police announced that they had arrested a 12-year-old boy and 13-year-old girl, both from St Helens, in relation to the break-in. Detective Inspector Jimmy Rotheram commented that "Although two arrests have been made our officers are continuing to investigate this crime which has caused extensive damage to Rainford High School resulting in the premises not being able to open today." Following this announcement, the school also announced that it would re-open the next day, Tuesday 28th, with students attending form and lessons as normal.

On 14 May 2024, Merseyside Police confirmed that a 13-year-old boy and 14-year-old girl had been charged with burglary and criminal damage in relation to the damage. The two youths involved caused approximately £150,000 worth of damage to the school buildings. The 14-year-old girl and 13-year-old boy would later plead guilty to this charge and would both be sentenced to a 12-month referral order, with the 14-year-old girl being ordered to pay £430 and the 13-year-old boy £250 in compensation to the school.

== Awards ==
The school has won, and has been nominated for, a number of awards, primarily through the Educate Awards.

Awards
Award name	Award Year	Awarded by	Nominated	Shortlisted	Won
SEND Provision Award	2024	Educate Awards	Yes	Yes	No
Most Inspirational Secondary School	2023	Educate Awards	Yes	Yes	No
Outstanding Arts in a Secondary School	2023	Educate Awards	Yes	Yes	No
SEND Provision Award	2022	Educate Awards	Yes	Yes	No
Outstanding Commitment to Physical Education in a Secondary School	2022	Educate Awards	Yes	Yes	No
Most Inspirational Secondary School	2022	Educate Awards	Yes	Yes	Yes
Career & Enterprise Award	2021	Educate Awards	Yes	Yes	Yes
SEND Provision Award	2021	Educate Awards	Yes	Yes	Yes
Mental Health & Wellbeing Award	2021	Educate Awards	Yes	Yes	No
Most Inspirational Secondary School	2021	Educate Awards	Yes	Yes	No
Education and Business Partnership of the Year	2021	St Helens Borough Business Awards	Yes	Yes	Yes
School Support Star of the Year	2020	Educate Awards	Yes	Yes	Yes
SEND Provision Award	2019	Educate Awards	Yes	Yes	Yes
Outstanding Commitment to Sport in a Secondary School	2019	Educate Awards	Yes	Yes	No
Outstanding Commitment to Sport in a Secondary School	2018	Educate Awards	Yes	Yes	Yes
Outstanding Commitment to Sport in a Secondary School	2017	Educate Awards	Yes	Yes	Yes
Wow Recognition Award	2017	Educate Awards	Yes	Yes	No
Outstanding Commitment to Sport in a Secondary School	2016	Educate Awards	Yes	Yes	No
Outstanding Commitment to Sport in a Secondary School	2015	Educate Awards	Yes	Yes	No
Outstanding Commitment to Sport in a Secondary School	2014	Educate Awards	Yes	Yes	Yes
Teacher of the Year	2014	Educate Awards	Yes	Yes	Yes

== Notable former pupils ==
- Lee Briers, rugby league footballer for Warrington Wolves
- Conor Coady, footballer, Leicester City FC
- Andrew Harrison (born 1970), CEO of Carphone Warehouse
- Jonny Lomax, rugby league footballer for St. Helens
- Willy Russell, dramatist and composer
