= Alexander Muse =

American blogger

- Born: Portsmouth, Virginia, U.S.
- Education: University of Texas at Austin
- Occupation: Internet entrepreneur
- Years active: 1995-present
- Known for: LayerOne; Architel; Big in Japan; ShopSavvy; Fancast; ViewMarket
- Board member of: ViewMarket, Active Retail
- Website: StartupMuse

Alexander Muse is an American internet entrepreneur who has founded several internet companies including LayerOne, ShopSavvy, Architel, and ViewMarket (among others). His most recent endeavor, Sumo Ventures, invests in early-stage startups.

== Early life and education ==
Muse was born in Portsmouth, Virginia. He attended the University of Texas at Austin where he studied history before leaving in 1995 to pursue his career.

== Career ==
Muse's first venture was an internet service provider, which was founded in 1997 and eventually acquired by DNA Technologies for an undisclosed amount. Muse then co-founded (with Brandon Freeman) LayerOne, a carrier-neutral colocation and interconnection services provider based in Dallas, in 1999. In November 2000 the firm was wiring the elevator shaft and an entire floor of the Univision Center in Dallas, Texas, with fiber-optic cables and telecommunications switches as what Muse called "an optical service provider."

The company filed for bankruptcy in 2001, but, with a team of investors, Muse was able to buy the company out of bankruptcy on September 12, 2001. Muse served as CEO of LayerOne until 2003.

Also in 2001, Muse co-founded (with Scott Ryan) Architel, an information services technology company based in Dallas. Four years later, Muse sold LayerOne to Switch and Data (now owned by Equinix). That sale, in addition to profits earned by Architel, allowed Muse to focus on and fund a business incubator called Big in Japan, which he also co-founded. Big in Japan, which was founded in Dallas in 2007, would be responsible for the incubation and creation of a variety of notable companies and properties including ShopSavvy, Fancast, MotorSport Ranch (TV series), WhiteBox, SimpleTicket, and others.

One of the first companies to come out of the Big in Japan incubator was Fancast, a social video and podcast service, in 2007. The company would eventually be sold to Comcast Interactive for an undisclosed amount of money. ShopSavvy, a company that produces an Android and iOS shopping and barcode scanner app, was founded in 2008 after winning the Google Android Developer Challenge. In 2009, Muse was honored with the Netexplorateur Award at the French Senate in Paris for his work on the app. The United States Patent Office granted Muse and his co-founders two key patents related to ShopSavvy (No. 20130297390 and No. 20130297464) in 2013.

In 2011, ShopSavvy raised money in a funding round led by Facebook co-founder, Eduardo Saverin. At that time, the app had accrued around 20 million downloads and Muse had facilitated thousands of partnerships with businesses like Walmart, Best Buy, Barnes & Noble, Target, and others. Muse held several roles at ShopSavvy including CEO and Executive Chairman. The company would eventually be sold to Purch in 2015 for an undisclosed amount of money.

In 2014, Muse co-founded (with Robert Bennett) ViewMarket, a collection of online lifestyle brands like CultureMap, Courtem, RSVP, and others. ViewMarket purchased CultureMap in April 2015. In June 2016, Muse sold Architel to Centre Technologies and founded a venture fund called Sumo Ventures. At its outset, the business had plans to invest in between 100 and 150 companies, most of which were early-stage companies. At Sumo Ventures, Muse's father, Ralph Muse, and his sister, Caroline Branch, serve as venture partner and CFO respectively.

== Personal life ==
Muse lives in Dallas with his two children. He is one of the founding advisors to the Dallas Entrepreneur Center and has been credited as one of the earliest proponents of the startup community in Dallas, having helped organize events such as BarCamp, Dallas Startup Weekend, and Dallas Startup Happy Hour. He is a member of the board of trustees for the Dallas Historical Society.
