= Andrew Harrison (businessman) =

British businessman and investor (born 1970)

- Born: 18 November 1970 (age 55)
- Education: Rainford High School
- Alma mater: University of Leeds
- Occupation: Businessman
- Known for: Chief executive of Carphone Warehouse Group (2013–2014); deputy CEO of Dixons Carphone (2014–2017)
- Title: Chairman, Carphone Warehouse
- Term: December 2017-
- Spouse: Tristia Harrison
- Children: 2 sons

Andrew Harrison (born 18 November 1970) is a British businessman, and former chairman of Carphone Warehouse.

== Early life ==
Harrison grew up in St Helens, the son of a window cleaner and factory worker father. He was educated at Rainford High School from 1981 to 1989, and earned a bachelor's degree in management studies from the University of Leeds in 1992.

== Career ==
=== Carphone Warehouse ===
In June 2013, Harrison replaced Roger Taylor as CEO of Carphone Warehouse, a position he held until 2014.

=== Dixons Carphone and return to Carphone Warehouse division ===
In 2014, Carphone Warehouse agreed a £3.8 billion merger with Dixons Retail to form Dixons Carphone, with Harrison appointed deputy chief executive of the combined group. In December 2017, Dixons Carphone announced that Harrison would step down from his deputy CEO role and become chairman of The Carphone Warehouse Limited, focusing on the group's mobile division. He resigned as a director of Currys plc (then Dixons Carphone plc) on 20 December 2017.

=== Investing and non-executive roles ===
Harrison joined the board of Ocado Group as a non-executive director in 2016 and later became senior independent director.

In April 2019, Harrison was appointed chairman of WhoCanFixMyCar.com. He resigned as a director of WhoCanFixMyCar.com on May 10, 2023. He joined the board of Dr. Martens plc as an independent non-executive director in 2023.

Harrison is also a founding partner at Freston Road Ventures.

== Recognition ==
Harrison was named TechRadar's Mobile Power 50 Person of the year in 2009 and 2014.

== Personal life ==
He is married to Tristia Harrison (née Clarke), CEO of TalkTalk Group since May 2017. They have two sons, and live in west London.
