= LayerOne =

LayerOne, Inc.
- Type: Private
- Industry: Internet
- Founded: 1999
- Headquarters: Dallas, TX, United States
- Key people: Alexander Muse, CEO
- Products: Data Centers
- Revenue: $10.8 million USD (2005)
- Number of employees: 60 (est) (2001)
- Website: www.layerone.com

LayerOne, Inc. acquired by Switch & Data Nasdaq: SDXC, in 2005, was a U.S. private corporation that provides carrier-neutral datacenters and interconnection.

== Services ==
LayerOne was a provider of network-neutral data centers and interconnection services, offering colocation, traffic exchange and outsourced IT infrastructure solutions. The company pioneered the concept of 'buy-side' interconnection, whereby carriers were encouraged to participate in 'pooling points' in major cities without upfront costs. Carriers who sold connectivity were charged a monthly recurring fee based on the capacity of the connection. Within three years the company provided interconnection services to every major and most minor telecommunications companies in the United States with the notable exception of Sprint.

=== American datacentres ===
- Dallas, Texas
- Miami, Florida
- Chicago, Illinois

== Notable customers ==
More than 800 different carriers, ISPs and businesses participate in LayerOne centers, including the world's largest IP backbone networks.

- AT&T
- MCI
- AOL
- SBC
- Comcast
- Bell South
- CenturyTel
- CTS Telecom
- Broadwing
- UUNet
- Verizon
- Cogent
- Level 3
- Microsoft
- MSN
- NTT Communications
- SAVVIS
- McCleod
- UUNET
- Verizon
- Yahoo!

== Company history ==
LayerOne was founded in 1999 by Alexander Muse. By 2001 the company had raised more than $20,000,000 in venture capital and opened facilities in Dallas, Chicago and Miami. While each facility was cash flow positive, the company had executed leases throughout the United States in anticipation of additional funding. When that funding did not materialize Alexander Muse and his management team reorganized the company under the U.S. Bankruptcy code. Within three months the company was profitable and over the next three years the company grew by more than 1000%. In 2005 the company was sold to Switch & Data providing a 600% return for the company's investors.

== Sources ==
- LayerOne invention of virtual pooling points
- CityNet enters LayerOne
- Cable & Wireless enters LayerOne
- LayerOne Best Corporate Turnaround 2005
- Level 3 enters LayerOne
- The LayerOne Story
- Official Website
