= Fulwood Academy =

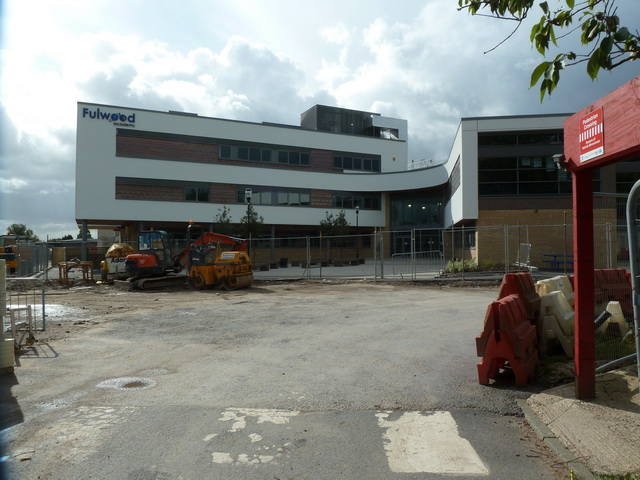
- New school building (2012)

Location
- Black Bull Lane; Fulwood; City of Preston, Lancashire, PR2 9YR; England
- Coordinates: 53.78728°N 2.71933°W

Information
- Type: Academy
- Founder: Sir Charles Dunstone
- Local authority: Lancashire
- Department for Education URN: 135936 Tables
- Ofsted: Reports
- Chair of Trustees: Joan Dean
- Principal & Accounting Officer: Andrew Galbraith
- Vice Principals: Lee McLinden & Penny Rimmer
- Gender: Coeducational
- Age: 11 to 16
- Colour: Blue
- Website: http://www.fulwoodacademy.co.uk/

Fulwood Academy (formerly Fulwood High School) is a coeducational secondary school located in Fulwood, Preston) in the English county of Lancashire.

Previously a community school administered by Lancashire County Council, Fulwood High School converted to academy status on 1 September 2009 and was renamed Fulwood Academy. The school is sponsored by Charles Dunstone through a charitable trust, the Dunstone Education Trust.

Fulwood Academy offers GCSEs and BTECs as programmes of study for pupils.
