= Best Buy Europe =

Consumer electronics joint venture, 2008 to 2012

Best Buy Europe Distributions Ltd.

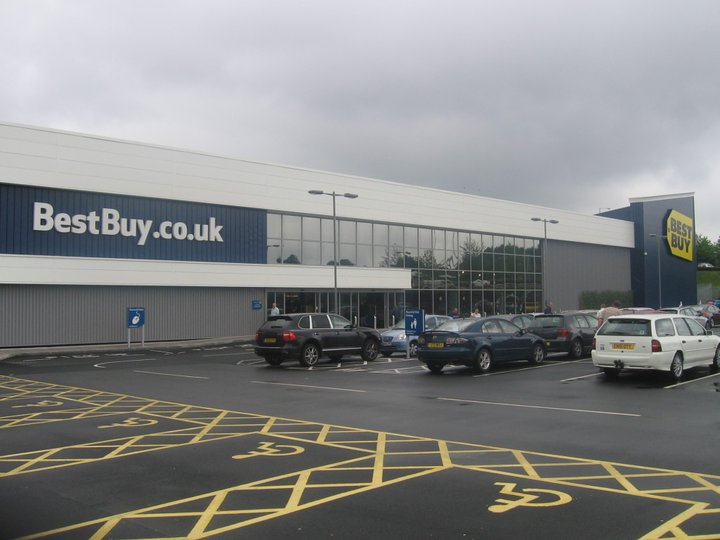
- Best Buy store in Westfield Merry Hill, West Midlands, UK
- Type: Joint venture
- Industry: Retailing; Electronics
- Founded: 2006; 20 years ago
- Defunct: January 14, 2012
- Headquarters: London, England
- Key people: Andrew Harrison (CEO); Steve Jensen (Managing Director); Jeff Severts (CMO); Ian Kenyon (CFO); Richard Clark (Head of Online)
- Owners: Best Buy; Carphone Warehouse
- Website: Archive of bestbuy.co.uk

Best Buy Europe Distributions Ltd. was a retail joint venture owned by the United States–based electronics retailer Best Buy Inc and United Kingdom–based mobile phone retailer Carphone Warehouse. The company was formed by Best Buy's purchase of 50% of The Carphone Warehouse's retail division in May 2008. Best Buy branded superstores opened in the United Kingdom beginning on April 30, 2010, with a store in Thurrock, Essex. Best Buy was due to open its first stores in the United Kingdom in 2009, but in March 2009, the firm postponed this until 2010, with plans for up to two hundred stores eventually. Carphone originally intended to open up to two hundred Big Box stores in Europe by 2013, but this goal was reduced to one hundred. On November 6, 2011, Carphone Warehouse announced its intention to close the eleven Best Buy "big box" format stores.

== History ==
Best Buy Co., Inc. is a Fortune 100 company, and the largest speciality retailer of consumer electronics in the United States and Canada, accounting for 21% of the market. The company's subsidiaries include Geek Squad, Magnolia Audio Video, and Pacific Sales; in Canada the Best Buy Canada subsidiary also operated under the Future Shop label until 2015.

Together, these operate more than 1,150 stores in the United States, Puerto Rico, Canada, China, Mexico and Turkey. The company's corporate headquarters are located in Richfield, Minnesota, United States (near Minneapolis). On June 26, 2007, Best Buy announced a 40% increase in its operations, with plans to operate more than 1,800 stores worldwide, including 1,400 Best Buy stores in the United States.

The Carphone Warehouse was co founded in 1989, when most portable phones were too bulky to carry and called car phones, by then CEO Charles Dunstone (together with David Ross) from £6,000 savings. The two companies first began working together in 2006, creating Best Buy Mobile stores in the United States and introducing Geek Squad in the United Kingdom.

The first Best Buy store in the United Kingdom opened at Junction Retail Park, near Lakeside Shopping Centre in Thurrock, Essex, on April 30, 2010.

Twenty locations were originally planned for in the coming year, all to be in the big box format. The company was looking for a flagship store in Central London by July 2008, in a prominent area such as Piccadilly Circus, Oxford Street, or Regent Street.

For fiscal year 2011, Best Buy UK saw full year losses nearly triple to £62.2m, equivalent to just over £10m for each of its stores trading during the period. Growth had been slower than some expected. Best Buy blamed the grim results on "impressive" investments in its new stores but it is "evaluating" the next step in its strategy. Best Buy had been reported to be considering bidding for Comet.

Best Buy closed all of its stores in the United Kingdom on January 14, 2012, due to poor financial results. The Best Buy–Carphone Warehouse partnership ended in June 2013, with Carphone buying back their 50% share from the American retailer.

=== Locations ===
- Lakeside Shopping Centre, Thurrock
- Southampton, Hedge End Retail Park
- Dudley, Merry Hill Shopping Centre
- Aintree, Racecourse Retail Park
- Croydon, Trafalgar Way Retail Park
- Derby, Kingsway Retail Park
- Hayes, Lombardy Retail Park
- Cribbs Causeway, Bristol
- Rotherham, Retail World Shopping Park
- Enfield, Enfield Retail Park
- Nottingham, Castle Marina Retail Park
