= Nicola Gordon Bowe =

Art historian, author and educator (1948-2018)

- Born: 1948; Stafford, England
- Died: 4 January 2018 (aged 69–70)
- Education: Trinity College Dublin (PhD)
- Occupation: Art Historian
- Spouse: Patrick Bowe (m. 1974)
- Children: 1
- Writing career
- Period: Arts and Crafts Movement in Ireland
- Notable works: Harry Clarke: The Life & Work, Wilhelmina Geddes: Life and Work

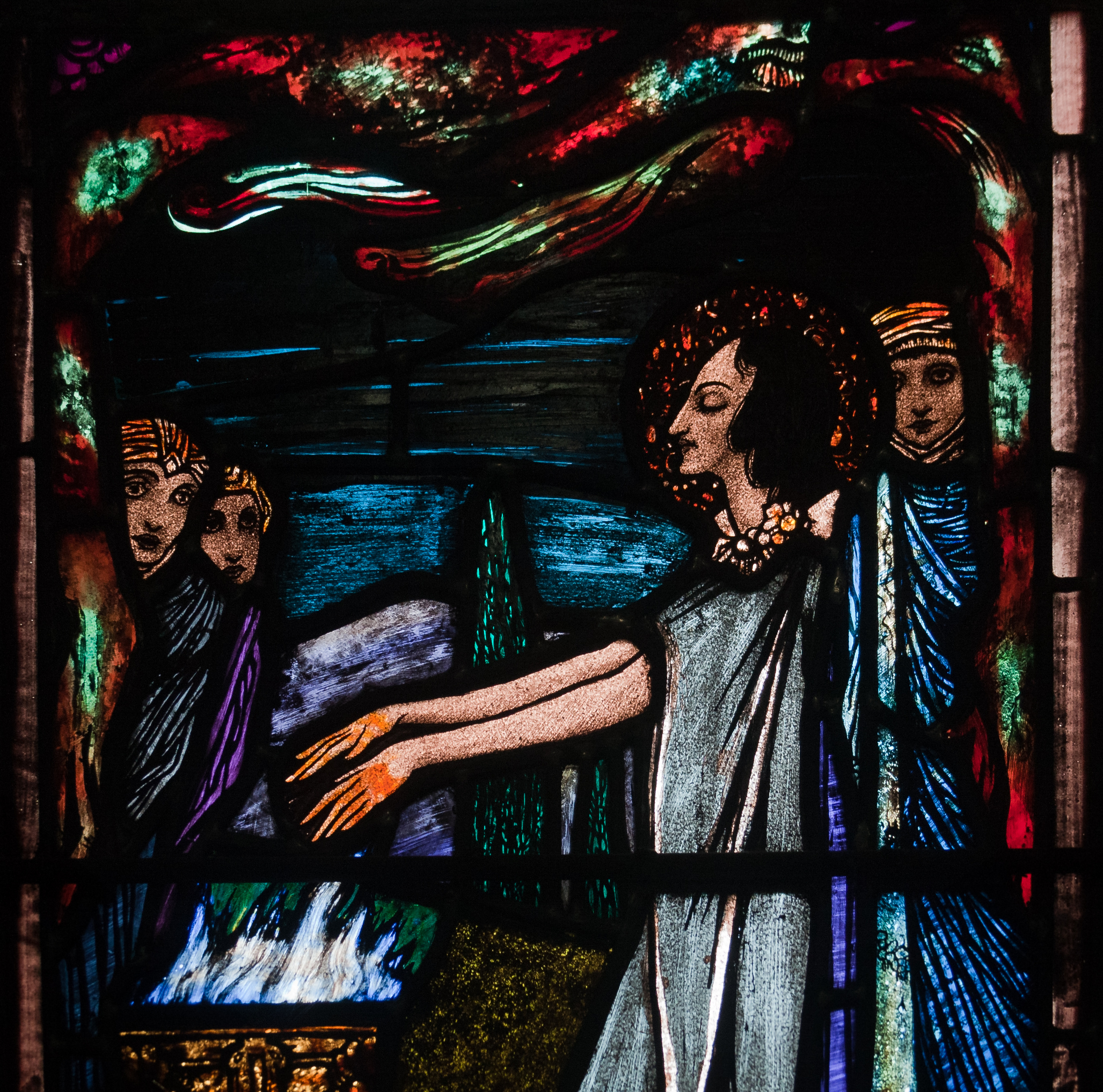
Stained-glass created by Harry Clarke

Nicola (Nikki) Gordon Bowe Hon FMGP (1948 – 4 January 2018) was an art historian, author and educator. She was a leading author on the Arts and Crafts movement in Ireland, most notably the revival of stained glass as an art form. She was also known for her extensive research and publications on stained glass artists Harry Clarke and Wilhelmina Geddes.

Bowe was an Associate Fellow at the Faculty of Visual Culture, National College of Art and Design in Dublin; Visiting Professor, School of Art and Design Research Institute at the University of Ulster; and recipient of a number of fellowships during her career.

== Early life and education ==
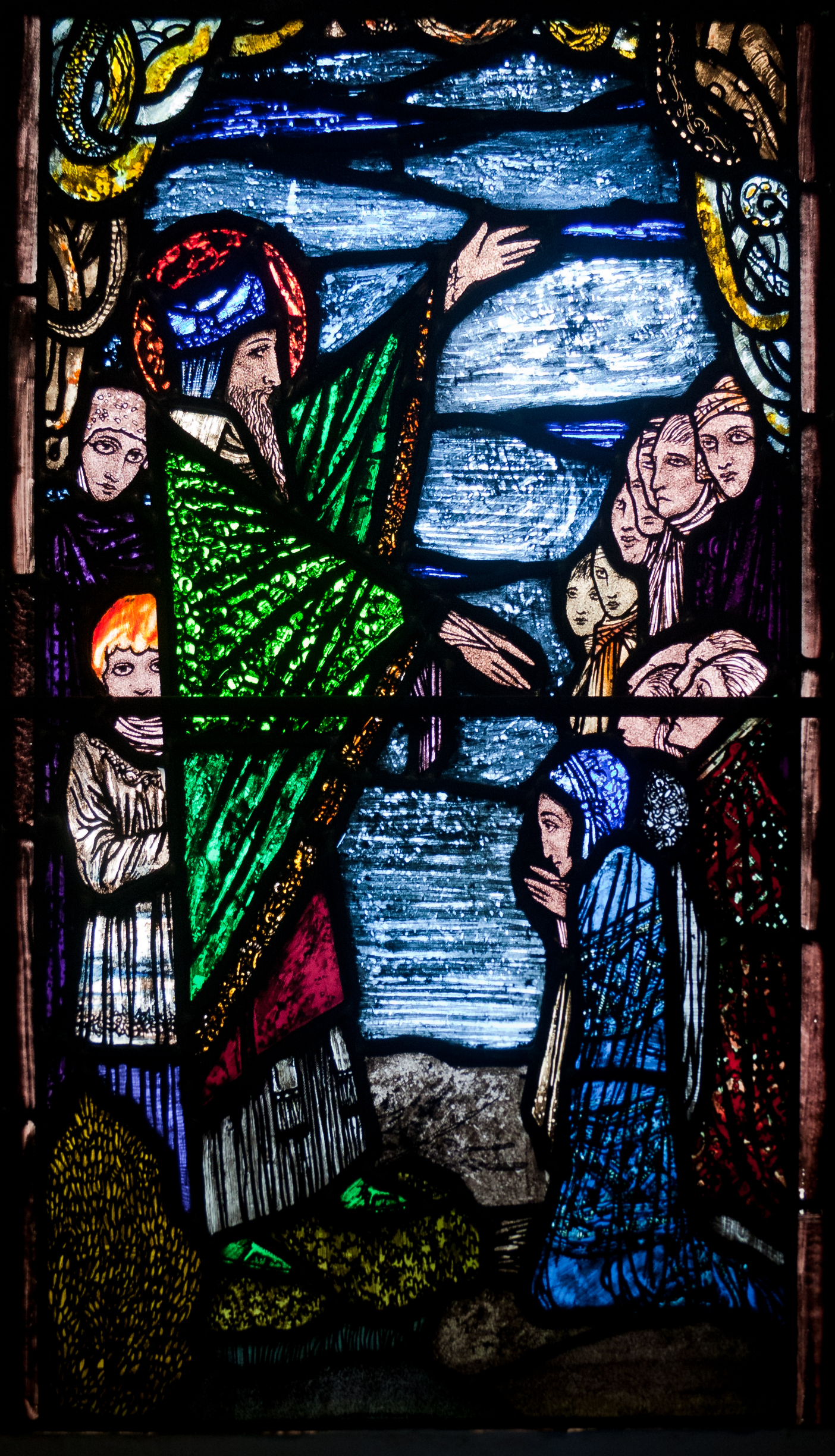
Stained glass created by Harry Clarke

Bowe was born in 1948 in Stafford, England to London councillor Richard Gordon and headmistress Elizabeth Smedley and raised in St Albans, Hertfordshire. She attended St Albans High School for Girls and completed her A levels at an English school in Rome, Italy. Inspired by her Irish roots in Clonmel on her paternal side, she decided to go to university in Ireland. She studied French and Italian as an undergraduate at Trinity College Dublin, earning a BA (honours) and later obtaining a MA and PhD in art history.

== Career ==
During her 30-plus year career, Bowe was a lecturer in the history of design at the Faculty of the School Visual Culture, National College of Art and Design in Dublin. She was a founding director of the master's course in Design History and Applied Arts. She was also a visiting professor at the School of Art and Design Research Institute at the University of Ulster. She held research fellowships at the University of Wales, the National Gallery of Art in Washington DC, the Huntington Library, California and the Guild of St. George (England) She also served as Ireland's representative for an international UNESCO study group for Art Nouveau architecture. Dr Bowe was named an Honorary Fellow of the British Society of Master Glass Painters in 2001 and served for many years on the Editorial Advisory Board for The Journal of Stained Glass, which published her obituary in the latest issue.

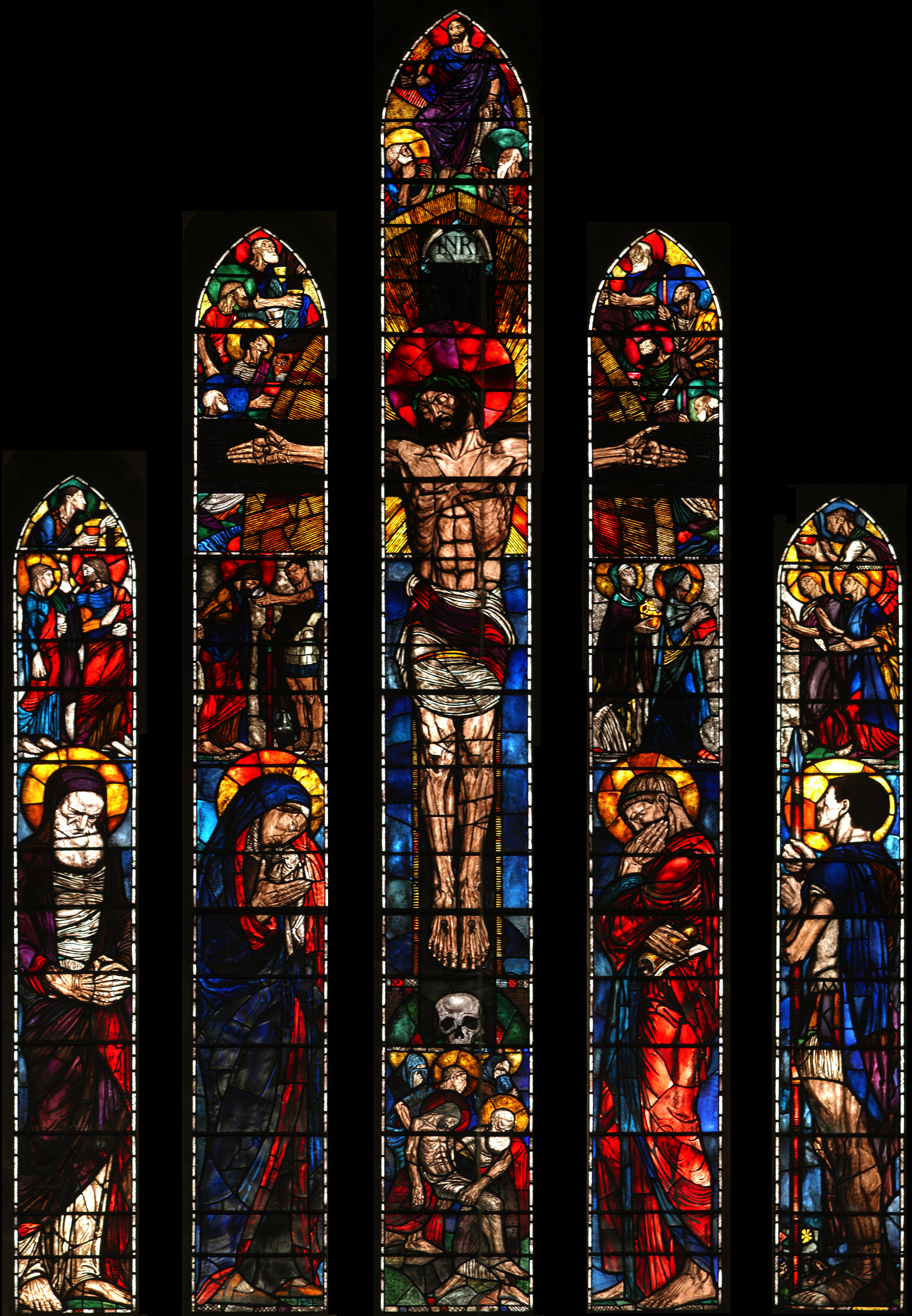
Stained glass created by Wilhelmina Geddes.

Bowe wrote and lectured extensively on the early 20th century Arts and Crafts Movement, the Celtic Revival, and the resurgence of stained glass as an art form. She contributed to a wide variety of publications and anthologies. Bowe's prominence as an art historian is the result of her exhaustive research, writing and advocacy for the long forgotten work of two remarkable stained glass artists, Harry Clarke and Wilhelmina Geddes.

Early 20th century stained glass artist, Harry Clarke, whose work Bowe rediscovered in various Irish rural churches, was the subject of Bowe's doctoral thesis in 1982. Her first book on Clarke was published in 1983. Her investigation into Clarke's life and work was the beginning of a long career of comprehensive research into the Arts and Crafts movement in Ireland. Bowe's influential book on the Life & Work of Harry Clarke, first published by Irish Academic Press in 1989, "re-established the reputation of this exceptional Irish artist of the early 20th century".

Bowe also devoted many years to investigating the life and art of Wilhelmina Geddes, a little known, Ulster-born stained glass artist. "Geddes who, like Harry Clarke, had been admired in life but largely forgotten in death". During her lifetime Geddes’ work was praised by art historians, but she was never able to achieve widespread success. Her total output as a stained glass artist was small, just over 30 stained glass commissions. Her work is now viewed as being equally important as the leading stained glass artists at that time. "In focusing on Geddes’ life and work, Bowe makes a significant contribution to our understanding of this golden age of British stained glass"

Bowe's book on Geddes was shortlisted for Book of the Year Apollo Awards in 2016.

== Personal life ==
Nicola Gordon married architect and garden historian Patrick "Paddy" Bowe at Leixlip Castle in 1974. They were based between Ranelagh, South Dublin and Glenmalure, County Wicklow. Their daughter Venetia (b. 1991) is an actress.

== Death ==
Bowe died unexpectedly on 4 January 2018 in Dublin, Ireland after a short illness.

== Selected publications ==
- Bowe, Nicola Gordon (2015). Wilhelmina Geddes: Life and Work. Four Courts Press. p. 506. ISBN 978-1846825323.
- Bowe, Nicola Gordon (2014). Harry Clarke: The Life & Work. The History Press. p. 384. ISBN 978-1845887421.
- Bowe, Nicola Gordon (1997). The Arts and Crafts Movements in Dublin and Edinburgh. Irish Academic Press. p. 232. ISBN 978-0716525790.
- Bowe, Nicola Gordon (1988). Gazetteer of Irish Stained Glass : The Works of Harry Clarke and the Artists of An Tur Gloine, (The Tower of Glass) 1903-1963. Irish Academic Press. pp. 120. ISBN 978-0716524137.
- Bowe, Nicola Gordon (1983). Harry Clarke: His Graphic Art. H. Keith Burns Publishers. p. 160. ISBN 978-0943842011.
