= Discount card =

Document guaranteeing discounts on some product or service

A discount card is a card or document, often a plastic credit card or paper card, that entitles the holder to discounts on the prices of some products or services.

== How it works ==
Cards may be issued as part of a loyalty program, offering discounts to existing customers to ensure their continuing custom; they may be offered free of charge, offering a modest discount with the intention of persuading purchasers to patronise participating shops; or they may be sold to members, offering larger discounts—for example, the tastecard offers 50% discounts at many restaurants—at a substantial annual cost. Cards may be offered by merchants or groups of merchants, by clubs or associations who negotiate on behalf of all members to obtain benefits, or by official organisations offering concessionary prices to qualifying groups, such as the disabled.

== Types ==
- Loyalty cards
- Cards giving entitlement to educational discount. In many cases, a discount may be offered on proof of student status, without a special card.
- Cards giving entitlement to military discount. In many cases, a discount may be offered on proof of current or former membership of a military service, without a special card.
- Cards giving entitlement to disability discount. In many cases, a discount may be offered on proof of disability, without a special card.
- Proof of age card, a card which certifies the age of the holder. This type of card may, for example, be used by older children for free or discounted travel on public transport. Cards of this type are also used to certify that people of youthful appearance are old enough to legally buy, for example, tobacco and alcoholic beverages.
