= Guy Johnson (businessman) =

English businessman

Guy Johnson is an English businessman, the former third business partner in Carphone Warehouse. He is estimated to have a fortune of £156 million, ranking him 546 in the Sunday Times Rich List of 2008.

After the business was founded by Charles Dunstone with £6,000 savings, he asked Johnson to join him as the second partner. Johnson, a former customer of Dunstone's at NEC UK, became the second partner when he joined the fledgling business, taking up the role of Logistics and Distribution director. When David Ross led the IPO of Carphone Warehouse in 2000, it had been so successful that the partners had not needed to borrow or involve outsiders: Dunstone owned half, Johnson a third, and Ross most of the rest.

However, only Johnson of the three partners had a family, and having according to media reports becoming less enamoured by the Ross-led European expansion of the organisation, sold the majority of his stake in 2001 and retired with his young family to his holiday home in Portugal. He now lives with his family in Kent.
