= St Albans High School for Girls =

Coordinates: 51°45′26″N 0°19′57″W

Location
- Townsend Avenue; St Albans, Hertfordshire, AL1 3SJ; England

Information
- Type: Private day school
- Motto: Initium sapientiae timor domini (The fear of the Lord is the beginning of wisdom)
- Religious affiliation: Church of England
- Established: 1889
- Local authority: Hertfordshire
- Chair of governors: Heather Greatrex
- Headmistress: Ann Massey
- Gender: Girls
- Age: 4 to 18
- Enrolment: 1145
- Houses: Julian, Mandeville, Paris, Verulam
- Colours: Navy and yellow
- Website: http://www.stahs.org.uk/

St Albans High School for Girls is a selective, private day school for girls aged 4 – 18 years located in St Albans and Wheathampstead. There are approximately 328 pupils in the preparatory school with 900 in the senior school and 186 sixth formers.

== History ==
Founded in 1889, the high school has close links with the Diocese of St Albans through the bishop, who is visitor to the school, and the dean, who is honorary vice-chair of the governing body. The high school moved from its original site on Holywell Hill to its current location on Townsend Avenue in 1908. The preparatory school took up residence at Wheathampstead House in 2003.

Founders' Day is the school's annual celebration of its beginnings. Old Girls, governors and other members of the school community are invited to a dedicated service in the cathedral and Abbey Church of St Alban to commemorate the founders with current students and staff.

== Senior school ==
The senior school and sixth form is in St Albans and facilities include an indoor swimming pool and fitness suite, a dedicated music school, Ringwood and a new performing arts centre and design & technology block. The school's large playing fields include tennis courts, lacrosse pitches and a new sports pavilion. Sixth formers also have exclusive access to the onsite Starbucks-style cafe. Pupils are prepared for GCSE and IGCSE examinations at the age of 16, for A Level examinations, for Oxford and Cambridge entrance and for the examinations of the Associated Board of the Royal Schools of Music along with Trinity Guildhall. Girls throughout the school have the opportunity to take speech and drama lessons in small groups preparation for a variety of LAMDA examinations.

== House system ==
At St Albans High School there are 4 houses:

- Julian
  - Named after: Lady Juliana Berners, a 15th-century prioress of Sopwell Nunnery, famous for her learning
  - Colour: red
  - Mascot: raven
- Paris
  - Named after: Matthew Paris, a monk of St Albans Abbey in the 13th century and well known for his chronicle of local events
  - Colour: blue
  - Mascot: fleur-de-lis
- Mandeville
  - Named after: Sir John Mandeville, associated with a book of travels in the 14th century
  - Colour: green
  - Mascot: Wyvern
- Verulam
  - Named after: Sir Francis Bacon, first Earl of Verulam, philosopher and writer
  - Colour: yellow
  - Mascot: lamp

== Notable alumni ==
- Rimla Akhtar, businesswoman and champion of inclusivity in sport
- Nicola Gordon Bowe (1948–2018), art historian, author and educator.
- Anne Buck (1910–2005), cultural historian and curator of dress
- Helen Ekins, horticulturalist
- Tristia Harrison, CEO TalkTalk
- Jane Hawking, author and academic
- Stephen Hawking was educated at the school between 1950 and 1953. Then, unlike today, boys were educated at the school until the age of ten.
- Claire Horwell, professor of geohealth
- Anna Neagle, stage and film actress
- Sophia Smith Galer, digital journalist and social media influencer
