= Tastecard =

Irish-British restaurant discount card

tastecard
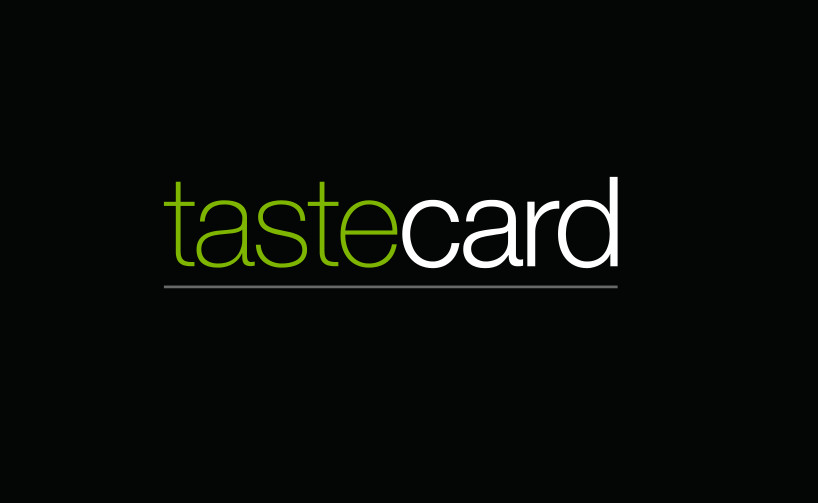
- Founded: 2006
- Founder: Matt Turner
- Headquarters: Huddersfield, UK
- Area served: United Kingdom and Ireland
- Products: Restaurant discount card
- Website: tastecard.co.uk

tastecard is a discount card accepted by many restaurants in the UK and Ireland offering typically a 50% discount or two meals for the price of one at participating restaurants; details and restrictions vary from restaurant to restaurant and are listed on the website. It is implemented by a physical card the same size as a credit card or a "digital card" on a mobile phone. Both chain and independent restaurants, some with a Michelin star, accept tastecard. Discounted pizza delivery and cinema tickets are also available. The price of annual membership as of 2023 was £34.99, often with a trial period available free or at nominal cost. As of July 2025 the price is £79.99 per year.

Restrictions may apply: some restaurants allow discounts to no more than two diners; cards may not be accepted at peak times such as Fridays or Saturdays, or December; it is usually necessary to book beforehand.

It was originally set up in 2006 as tastelondon by founders Matt Turner and Jamie Milner, and re-branded in 2010 to encompass the rest of the UK and Ireland. In June 2014 tastecard reported over 7,000 participating restaurants and over 800,000 members. It claims to be "the UK's biggest dining club", but no longer lists numbers of members and restaurants.

Restaurants in the scheme are required to offer a discount to members, but the restaurants do not receive a share of the membership fee. The tastecard website and smartphone app allow users to search for participating restaurants near a specified location. Members can also use the smartphone app to access their digital card, write restaurant reviews and see their total savings. The app is available on Apple and Android devices. User reviews and are available via a Web search, and on the review sections of the app pages.

As of 2023 most memberships are digital and auto-renewing, requiring a mobile telephone and without a physical card. Reviews on the Play Store for the Android version report difficulties logging into the app, so that it cannot be used, or cancelled.

== tastecard+ ==
The company launched special offer platform tastecard+ in May 2013, which became available as a payable add-on to annual tastecard membership, offering discounts on fine dining, hotels, cinema, theatre, live music, comedy and family days out, and competitions and giveaways. In 2023 tastecard+ was not mentioned on the tastecard Web site, and many non-restaurant offers were available to all card holders.

== Charity ==
In 2012 and 2013 the company supported Mary's Meals, an international charity that initiates school feeding projects in some of the poorest communities of the world. In that period tastecard donated £5 to Mary's Meals for every tastecard membership sold. As of 1 November 2013 they had donated £230,148.00 to the charity over the preceding 18 months. A page about Mary's Meals was included in the tastecard Web site until 2021.

== See also ==
- Discount card
- Dining club
