= Carphone Warehouse =

Mobile phone retailer

Currys Retail Limited
- Founded: 1989; 37 years ago
- Founder: Charles Dunstone and Julian Brownlie
- Fate: Stores closed in 2020, and concessions within Currys PC World rebranded to Currys mobile in 2021, now trades only online
- Successor: Currys mobile (concessions within Currys PC World)
- Headquarters: London, England, UK
- Revenue: £10.7 million (2013)
- Operating income: £57.1 million (2013)
- Net income: £4.2 million (2013)
- Number of employees: over 11,500
- Parent: Currys plc
- Website: www.carphonewarehouse.com

Currys Mobile, trading as Carphone Warehouse, is an online-only mobile phone retailer operating as a trading name of Currys Retail Limited (part of Currys plc).

In August 2014 the company became a subsidiary of Currys plc (previously named "Dixons Carphone"), which was formed by the merger of its former parent Carphone Warehouse Group with Dixons Retail. Prior to this merger, Carphone Warehouse Group was listed on the London Stock Exchange, and was a constituent of the FTSE 250 Index.

Following the closure of all standalone UK stores in April 2020, the only remaining Carphone Warehouse UK outlets were those within branches of Currys PC World. In April 2021, all standalone and co-located Carphone Warehouse branches in Ireland (and the associated website) were closed with immediate effect. Currys continued to use the Carphone Warehouse brand in the United Kingdom both online and in Currys stores until 2021.

== History ==
=== Early years ===
The company was co-founded in 1989 by Sir Charles Dunstone and Julian Brownlie, who made an initial personal investment of £6,000 into the company. Guy Johnson of NEC UK became the second partner at the company, later taking up the role of Logistics and Distribution director. In 1990, Dunstone's school friend David Ross, a chartered accountant, became Chief Operating Officer.

=== 1999 to 2009 ===
In January 1999, the company bought Tandy's operations in the United Kingdom for £9 million. In July 2000, Carphone Warehouse issued an IPO. In July 2001, Johnson sold the majority of his stake in the company and retired. Carphone Warehouse bought Opal Telecom in November 2002.

In 2003, Ross gradually stepped down as COO, becoming deputy chairman in July 2005. On 10 October 2006, Carphone Warehouse announced that it would purchase AOL in the United Kingdom for £370m. Also in that month, it was announced that Geek Squad would be launching in the United Kingdom, in a 50/50 joint venture between Carphone Warehouse and Best Buy.

In May 2008, Best Buy agreed to buy a 50% share in Carphone Warehouse's retail business for £1.1 billion, to launch the Best Buy Europe joint venture, named CPW Europe. Best Buy and Carphone Warehouse also opened joint venture stores in the United States.

Ross, by now a non-executive director, resigned from the board in December 2008.

=== 2010 to 2021 ===
In 2010, the broadband and home phone branches of Carphone Warehouse were spun off as TalkTalk.

In May 2014, Carphone Warehouse Group and Dixons Retail announced their merger to create Dixons Carphone. The merger completed on 7 August 2014. The Dixons Group staff moved into 1 Portal Way, the original home of Carphone Warehouse in West London, in May 2015.

In May 2015, Carphone Warehouse launched iD Mobile, a mobile virtual network operator using Three's network.

In April 2020, products and services from the O2 network ceased to be available from Carphone Warehouse after the companies were unable to reach a contractual agreement.

Former Carphone Warehouse Group logo, in use until 2014 merger with Dixons Retail

==== Closure of standalone UK stores ====
In March 2020, the company announced that they would be closing all 531 standalone UK stores the following month, with sales operations continuing within co-located "shops within shops" at Currys PC World stores and through the website. It was said that this measure was a result of the changing mobile market.

==== Closure in Ireland ====
On 21 April 2021, the company announced that its entire business in Ireland, including all 69 standalone stores, 12 outlets within other stores, and the carphonewarehouse.ie website would close with immediate effect, with the loss of 486 jobs. The company stated the closures were in line with the decision to close all UK stores the previous year, with the changes in the mobile market and customer shopping behaviour being accelerated by the COVID-19 pandemic. Owner, Dixons Carphone, noted that it would continue to sell phones and accessories in Ireland through Currys PC World stores and the Currys website.

=== Demergers and disposals ===
On 8 May 2009, Carphone Warehouse agreed to pay £236m in cash for the United Kingdom assets of Tiscali, an Italian telecoms group. Tiscali UK later became part of TalkTalk.

In March 2010 TalkTalk and Carphone Warehouse split, with Dido Harding becoming CEO of TalkTalk and Roger Taylor becoming CEO of New Carphone Warehouse. Dunstone remained Chairman of both companies. On 30 April 2013, Carphone Warehouse agreed to purchase Best Buy's 50% stake in Best Buy Europe for £500 million.

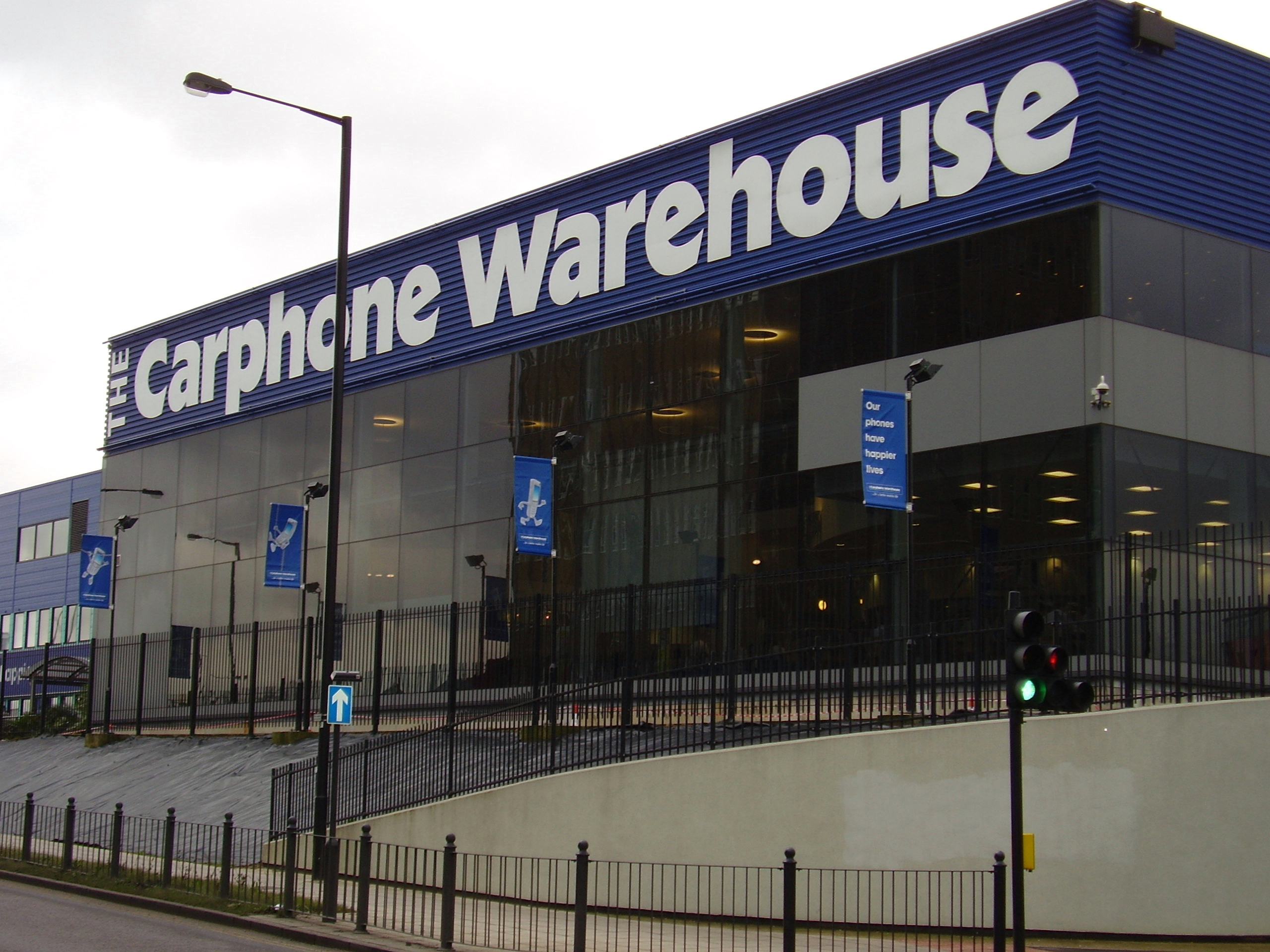
Carphone Warehouse Support Centre in Acton, London (2006)

Carphone Warehouse owned 46% of Virgin Mobile France in a joint venture with Virgin Group. In June 2014, Carphone and Virgin agreed to sell Virgin Mobile France to Numericable for €325 million. French competition regulators, ARCEP, approved the deal in November 2014.

== Data protection issues ==
During April 2005, customers who bought mobile phones from Carphone Warehouse retail outlets alleged that their landline accounts were subsequently switched without their consent.

On 15 August 2006, the Information Commissioner's Office issued Preliminary Enforcement Notices for breaches of PECR (The Privacy and Electronic Communications Regulations) against Carphone Warehouse and TalkTalk for making marketing calls to people who were signed up to the Telephone Preference Service (TPS) or people who had asked that the company make no further calls to them. On 28 October 2006, in an interview in The Times, Richard Thomas, Britain's Information Commissioner, stated:

We're taking action against some of the telecom companies, Talk Talk and Carphone Warehouse. We're taking action against them because we've had a lot of complaints that they've been telephoning people with marketing calls, people whose name is on the telephone preference service. And then we do these prosecutions, particularly with private detectives. We've got a big case coming up.

On 5 August 2015, hackers gained access to the data of 2.4 million people who had used sites operated by Carphone Warehouse, including OneStopPhoneShop.com, e2save.com, Mobiles.co.uk and TalkTalk Group.

In January 2018, the company was fined £400,000 by the ICO for "multiple inadequacies" in Carphone's security processes, including using old software and failing to carry out routine security testing. Intruders were able to access personal information, including the names, addresses, phone numbers, dates of birth, marital status and, in more than 18,000 cases, historical payment card details of Carphone Warehouse customers.

== Marketing and sponsorship ==
=== The X Factor ===
On 19 June 2007, Carphone Warehouse became the official sponsor of the fourth series of The X Factor. The sponsorship deal was to last for three years. Carphone Warehouse also became the sponsor of its spin off show, The Xtra Factor. After Carphone Warehouse and TalkTalk split, TalkTalk took over sole sponsorship of The X Factor.

=== Big Brother ===
The company were the sponsors for Big Brother UK from 2004 to 2007. In 2006, they also sponsored Celebrity Big Brother and related Celebrity Big Brother shows on Channel 4.

On 17 January 2007, in response to alleged racism in Celebrity Big Brother, Charles Dunstone said: "We are talking to Channel 4. The sponsorship is constantly under review. Clearly we are against racism. Most people understand that the person who has their name associated with the programme does not necessarily condone the content."

On 18 January 2007, Carphone Warehouse announced that it had suspended its sponsorship of the show as Channel 4 had not taken sufficient action in response to the alleged racism in the show. On 8 March 2007, the company permanently dropped its sponsorship of the show.

=== Appy Awards ===
In April 2011, Carphone Warehouse sponsored the Appy Awards, calling them "the United Kingdom’s first major app awards ceremony designed to recognise innovation and development in app technology".

Carphone Warehouse staff nominated around 1,000 apps from which a panel of judges produced a shortlist of 50, announced by Richard Hammond in February 2011. In an online process, about 30,000 votes were cast by the public to choose the winners. Finland-based Rovio Mobile's 2009 game Angry Birds won the award for Best App of the Year, along with a win in the Best Game App category and a nomination in the Best Time Waster App category. Lima Sky's Doodle Jump, which topped 10 million downloads in March 2011, was nominated in both the Best Game App and Best Time Waster App categories but failed to win either.

Appy Award winners and nominees
Category	Winner	Shortlisted nominees	Ref.
Best Game App	Angry Birds	Sonic; Flight Control; FIFA 11; Doodle Jump	
Best Lifestyle App	Amazon	LoveFilm; Tesco Groceries; Jamie Oliver's 20 minute meals BBM	
Best Moneysaving App	Skype	Tastecard; Money Supermarket vouchercloud ShopSavvy Barcode Scanner	
Best Music App	Spotify	Virtuoso Piano; My Music Anywhere; Last FM; Shazam	
Best Photography App	Adobe Photoshop	Instagram; Hipstamatic iMovie; FatBooth	
Best Sport App	Sky Sports News	Endomondo Sports Tracker; Nike+ GPS; Adidas MiCoach; Football Manager Handheld 2011	
Best Time Saver App	Google Maps	ShopSavvy Barcode Scanner; Sky+ Dragon Dictation; Tube Exits	
Best Time Waster App	Facebook	Doodle Jump; YouTube; Football Manager Handheld 2011; Angry Birds	
Best Travel App	TripAdvisor	City Guides Time Out; Google Translate; Flight Tracker; Tube Deluxe	
App of the Year	Angry Birds		

== Charity support ==
In October 2001, Carphone Warehouse established a corporate partnership with Get Connected UK, a confidential helpline service for young people that continues today as "The Mix". Carphone Warehouse supplies Get Connected with office and helpline equipment and has been instrumental in ensuring it is free to call from all landlines and mobiles. This partnership won the Charity Times Corporate Partnership Award in 2003 and the Third Sector Excellence Award for Corporate Partnership in 2006.

== See also ==
- Local loop unbundling
