= Switch and Data =

American data center provider

Switch and Data Facilities Company, Inc.
- Company type: Public
- Industry: Internet
- Founded: 1998
- Defunct: 2010
- Fate: Acquired by Equinix and completely integrated into it
- Headquarters: Tampa, FL, United States
- Key people: Keith Olsen, CEO
- Products: Data Centers
- Revenue: $171,525 million USD (2008)
- Number of employees: 339 (est 2008)
- Parent: Equinix

Switch and Data Facilities Company, Inc. was a U.S. public corporation that provided network-neutral data centers and Internet exchange services to network-centric businesses. Switch and Data was acquired by Equinix in 2010.

Switch and Data provided services including colocation, interconnection, network connectivity and peering from 34 data center locations. Typically, customers looked to Switch and Data to add scale and interconnectivity to their networks to support increases in IP and network traffic volumes. In addition, customers used Switch and Data's data center facilities to house and power their network infrastructure.

In 2008 Switch and Data expanded by adding over a quarter million square feet of data center capacity, an increase of 34% of their total capacity. Before their purchase by Equinix, Switch and Data's footprint included 23 markets throughout U.S. and Canada and provides power and cooling densities of up to 200 watts per square foot to more than 900 customers. In 2009, the company had announced a $75 million capex budget for further expansion. Switch and Data previously launched their Content and Entertainment and Financial Services Practices to help these industries with low-latency data aggregation and distribution.

== Company history ==
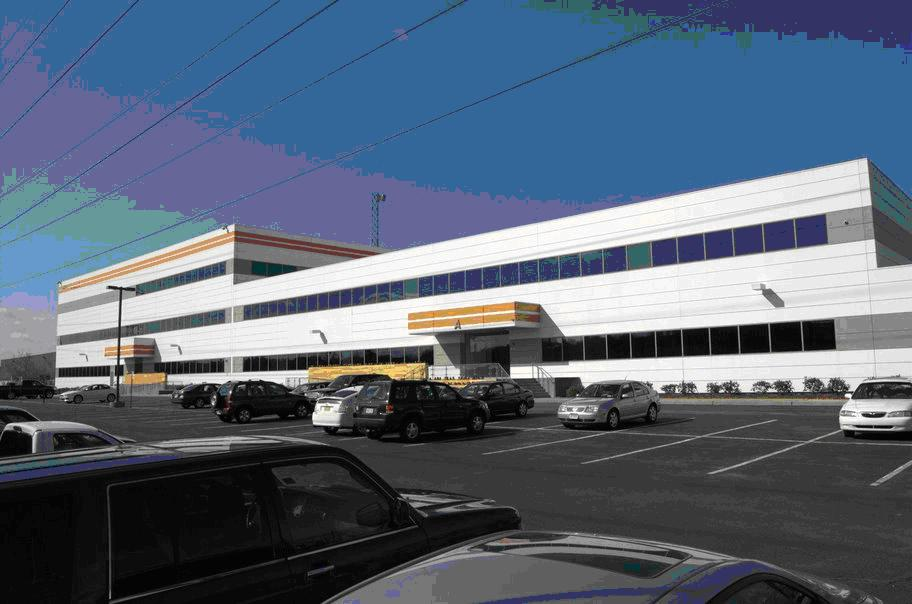
Switch and Data's North Bergen, New Jersey Data Center site location

Switch and Data was founded in 1998 by James F. Lavin and Stephen Kelly. In March 2003, Switch and Data acquired PAIX, the world's first commercial Internet peering exchange. The PAIX acquisition gave Switch and Data and strong presence in global Internet peering and added some of the world's leading Internet content and service providers as customers. Between 2004 and 2005, Switch and Data purchased RACO, Meridian Telesis and LayerOne. The company completed an initial public offering of its stock on February 8, 2007, and is currently traded on the NASDAQ exchange under ticker symbol SDXC. Switch and Data is headquartered in Tampa, Florida.

Switch and Data was acquired by Equinix on May 4, 2010 for 683.4 Million.

== Products and services ==
Switch and Data is a North American provider of network-neutral data centers and Internet exchanges. In addition, the company offers services such as colocation, interconnection and remote technical support. The companies’ data centers provide the power, interconnectivity, security, redundancy, cooling and site technical support to house and safeguard its customers’ network and computing equipment.

Switch and Data is a network-neutral provider which means that customers can choose to interconnect with multiple competing carriers across its national footprint of densely interconnected data centers. Customers can exchange traffic and IP content through direct connections with each other, or through many-to-many peering connections on Switch and Data's PAIX Internet exchange. Switch and Data's customers have provisioned approximately 21,100 cross-connects between each other in the company's 34 sites.

== Data center locations ==
Switch and Data has 34 data centers located in 23 markets across North America. Switch and Data's data centers typically have lower power density and are medium-sized suites in Carrier hotels. The majority suites were built between 1999 and 2002. The exception being the North Bergen, NJ and Sunnyvale, CA sites that were purchased and remodeled in 2008.

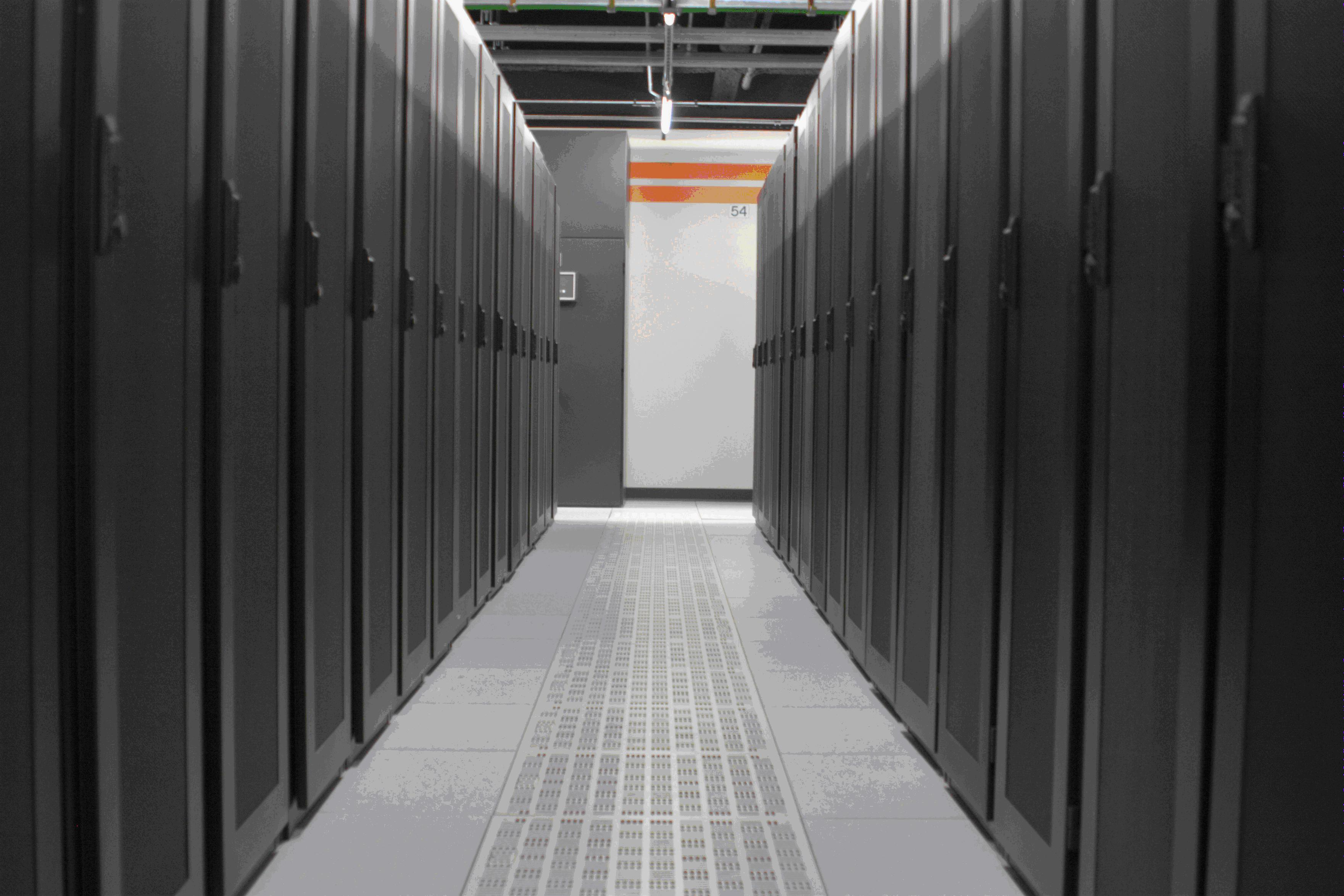
Inside one of Switch and Data's Facilities
