= ShopSavvy =

Mobile application for shopping

- Developer(s): Rylan Barnes, Jason Hudgins and Alexander Muse, Big in Japan Inc.
- Initial release: 2008
- Stable release: 5.0.3 on Android; 5.0.0 on iOS; 1.10.0.0 on Windows Phone / 31 January 2012; 13 years ago
- Written in: C
- Operating system: Android, iOS, Windows Phone, Symbian
- Size: 5.3 MB on Android; 12.2 MB on iOS; 1 MB on Windows Phone; 0.75 MB on Nokia Symbian
- Available in: English
- Type: Shopping
- License: Free
- Website: shopsavvy.com

ShopSavvy is a mobile application for shopping that scans products and finds online and local stores providing those products. Additionally, ShopSavvy compares the prices, displays user reviews, and searches for deals and discounts on scanned items. The app was developed by Rylan Barnes, Jason Hudgins and Alexander Muse, who won the "Google's Android Developer Challenge" and subsequently founded ShopSavvy, Inc.

By 2012, the app had approximately 20 million downloads and over 10 million users since its launch. Today ShopSavvy is the world's most popular shopping application with more than 100M downloads of the technology, with over 50 million product scans a month.

ShopSavvy is a cross-platform application. It is currently available for Android, iOS, Symbian, and Windows Phone devices.

== History ==
After Rylan Barnes, Jason Hudgins and Alexander Muse partnered up, the app won Google's Android Developer Challenge in 2008, under the name GoCart. They later renamed the app ShopSavvy to better reflect its purpose and to meet Google's Android and T-mobile guidelines.

The company then developed a QR code reader and scanner to be used as a feature in other apps.

=== Investors ===
Facebook cofounder Eduardo Saverin led a $5M funding for the company. Another investor is Brad Martin, former CEO of Saks.

== Public reception ==
Professional ratings
Review scores
Source	Rating
App Store	4.5/5 stars
Android Market	4.2/5 stars
Windows Marketplace	3.5/5 stars
Nokia Store	2/5 stars

Gizmodo: "This is one of the best barcode apps for Android." The app also was at the top of the website's lists in: "Gizmodo's Best Barcode Scanner Apps" and "Gizmodo's Best Android Shopping Apps".

Soon after its release in the Android Market it ranked in the top ten hits in the market. Three months after its release on the iPhone, it ranked as the 154th most popular iPhone app of all time, out of more than 200,000 apps.

Consumers have recently complained about the latest updates flaws, claiming that basic features stopped working. Yet the app maintains a 4.5 stars out of 5 in the App Store and a 4.2 out of 5.0 score on the Android Market.
