= ICT Hub =

The ICT Hub was a project in the UK that aimed to support voluntary and community-based organisations in England with their technology needs. It was set up in 2005 and closed in 2008. The Hub worked to create sustainable environment whereby charities and community groups can benefit from the use of information and communications technology (ICT).

== Services ==
Smaller organisations can benefit enormously from effective use of technology, whether this is by building a website to communicate with its beneficiaries, or creating a database to manage its members. However charitable organisations often do not have the funds or expertise to implement technological solutions successfully. The ICT Hub aimed to help charities overcome these barriers. To achieve this the Hub offered services and support including:

- Accessibility audits for charities
- Educational events and seminars
- Online resources and useful information
- Publications that cover all aspects of ICT
- Circuit Rider – mobile IT technicians who offer low cost IT support
- IT volunteers – professionals who give up their time to help charities implement technology solutions
- Regional champions - individuals in each of the English regions who offer local advice and support e.g. Regional ICT Champion for Yorkshire and Humber
- Helpdesk – a free telephone number where charities can be signposted to services and support in their local area

== Partnership ==
The ICT Hub was part of the UK’s Home Office ChangeUp programme for strengthening the capacity of the voluntary and community sector. Funding for the ICT Hub ended March 2008. The Hub consisted of a partnership of organisations:

- AbilityNet
- Media Trust
- It4communities
- Lasa (London Advice Services Alliance)
- NCVO (National Council for Voluntary Organisations)
- NAVCA (National Association for Voluntary and Community Action)
