= FatBooth =

Photo editing software

- FatBooth logo
- Original authors: PiVi & Co
- Release: May 2010
- Stable release: iOS 5.0 (25 November 2020; 5 years ago) [±] Android 3.1 (9 August 2016; 10 years ago) [±]
- Operating system: iOS, Android
- Available in: English, French
- Type: Photo sharing
- License: Proprietary software
- Website: www.piviandco.com/apps/fatbooth/

FatBooth is a mobile app developed by French company PiVi & Co. Using the app, users can take photos of themselves ("selfies") or use any portrait and apply a visual effect that makes the subject appear to be overweight. It was initially released in May 2010, priced at $0.99.

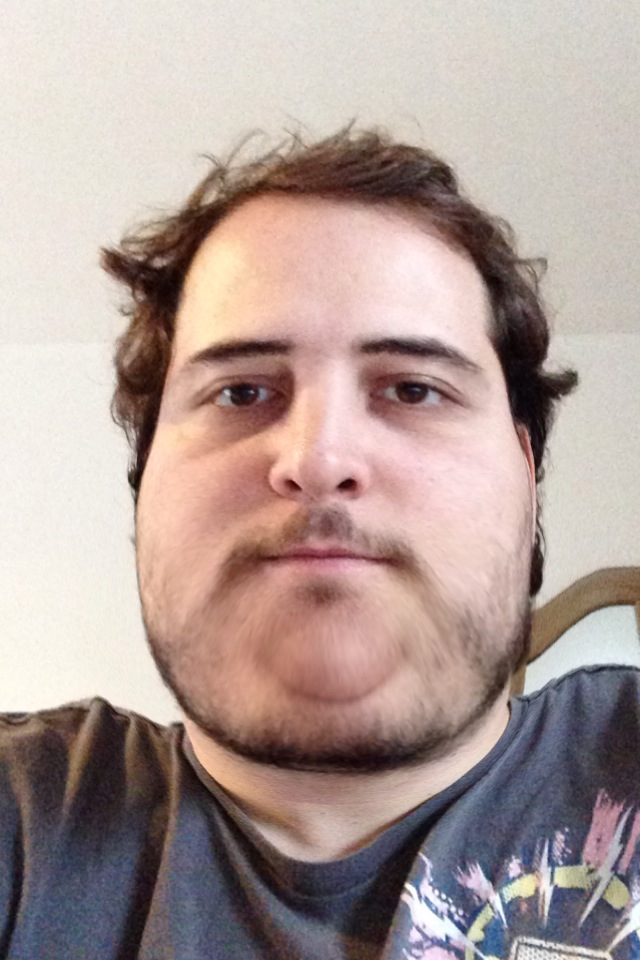
Portrait made with the FatBooth app

== Success ==
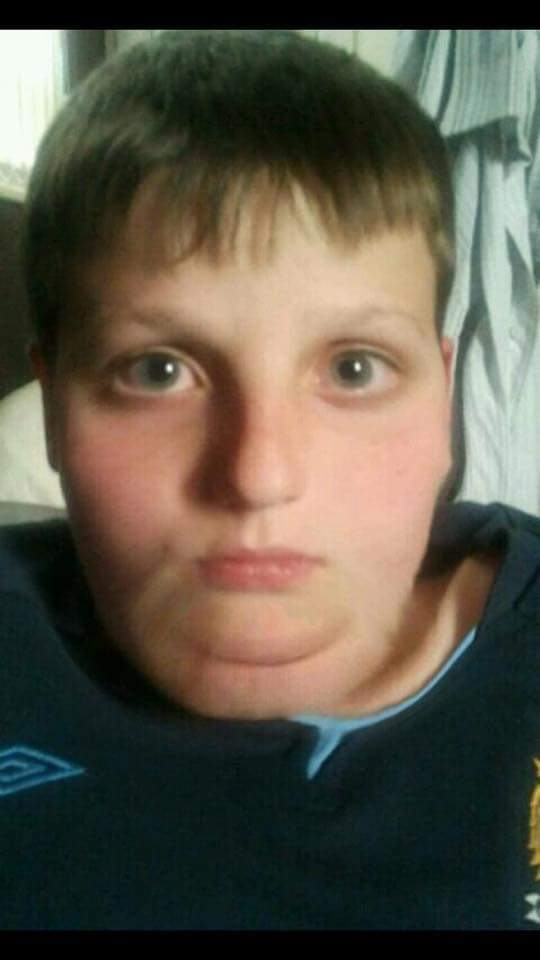
Example of a male after using FatBooth

PiVi & Co claims that FatBooth is a "top 25 all-time paid app". The company is probably referring to figures released by Apple in 2012, when celebrating the 25th billion app download. On that ranking it appeared that FatBooth was the 17th most downloaded paid app over the preceding 12 months. However, it appears that this is no longer the case, as seen on the new all-time ranking shared by Apple to celebrate the 50 billionth iOS app download in 2013.

As of January 2014, FatBooth has been installed over 10 million times on the Android platform. Some have estimated the gross revenue for the app on the iOS platform to be as high as $24 million, making it one of the highest grossing iOS apps of all time. However, PiVi & Co's published revenues show that the company, across all its apps, actually brought revenues of 1.4 million euros (US$1.9 million) in 2010, 2.1 million euros (US$2.8 million) in 2011 and in 1.4 million euros (US$1.9 million) in 2012.

== Predecessor and spin-offs ==
AgingBooth (making the subject look old) was released by PiVi & Co in February 2010, predating FatBooth. It has seen comparable success, ranking similarly on the iOS app store. However, unlike FatBooth, PiVi & Co doesn't make any official claims about AgingBooth's historical ranking in the app store, suggesting that it was less successful than FatBooth.

Following the success of AgingBooth and FatBooth, PiVi & Co continued to release similar apps, expanding the same concept:

- BaldBooth (making the subject look bald)
- MixBooth (mixing two subjects)
- UglyBooth (making the subject look ugly)
- BoothStache (giving the subject a mustache)
- BimboBooth (making the subject look like a bimbo)
