= Mobile Electronic Certified Professional =

US certificate of achievement program

Mobile Electronic Certified Professional Program
- Type: Certificate
- Industry: Electronics
- Founded: 1991
- Headquarters: Arlington, Virginia, United States
- Parent: Consumer Electronics Association
- Website: www.mecp.com/Home.aspx

The Mobile Electronic Certified Professional (MECP) is a certificate of achievement program in the United States that is managed and administered by the Consumer Electronics Association (CEA). The purpose of this certification is to ensure that individuals who install after-market electronics into vehicles and other vessels (such as aircraft or watercraft) do so in a consistent, safe, and reliable manner. Designed for mobile electronics installers, MECP certification training teaches the theory and practice of the 12-volt electronics industry. Exam questions and course content focus on "real-world" scenarios such as "eliminating noise, selecting proper gauge wires, determining ground locations and dealing with customer issues." There are four levels of certification offered through CEA, including three technical certifications of varying degrees, and one sales certification.
