= Charles Dunstone =

British co-founder and former chairman (born 1964)

Sir Charles Dunstone CVO
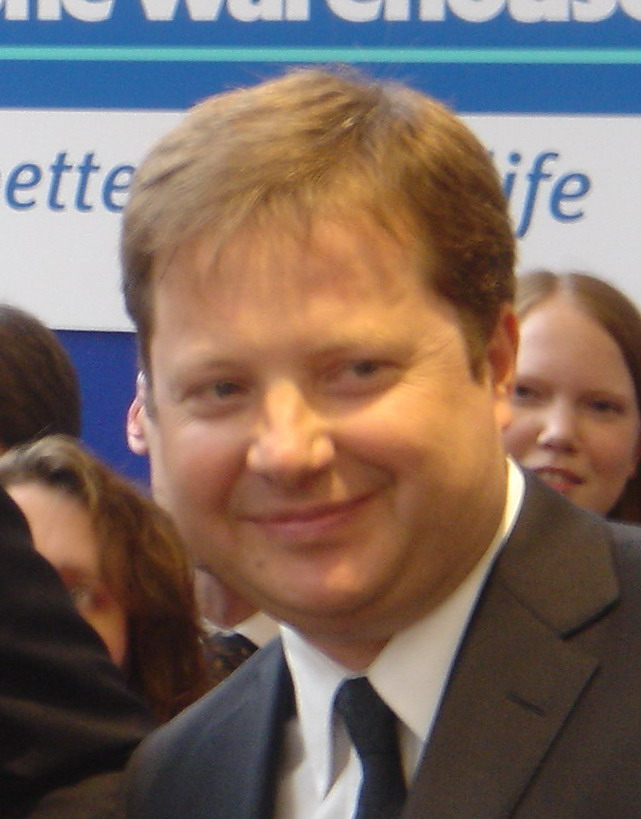
- Dunstone pictured in 2005.
- Born: Charles William Dunstone; 21 November 1964 (age 61); Saffron Walden, Essex, England
- Occupations: Executive Chairman, TalkTalk Group
- Years active: 1989–present
- Spouse: Celia Gordon Shute (m. 2009)
- Children: 3

Sir Charles William Dunstone CVO (/ˈdʌnstən/ DUN-stən; born 21 November 1964) is the British co-founder and former chairman of mobile phone retailer Carphone Warehouse, former chairman of multinational electrical and telecommunications retailer and services company Dixons Carphone (formed on 7 August 2014 by the merger of Dixons Retail and Carphone Warehouse), and executive chairman of the TalkTalk Group.

== Early life ==
Dunstone was born on 21 November 1964 in Saffron Walden, Essex. He was educated at Uppingham School, an independent school for boys (now co-educational) in the market town of Uppingham, Rutland. Dunstone's father was an executive at BP.

== Business ==
=== Carphone Warehouse ===
In 1983, having accepted an offer to study business at the University of Liverpool, Dunstone decided to defer his studies for a year and accept a sales job at Torch Computers in Cambridge. After a year, he decided to continue at Torch instead of pursuing his studies, eventually leaving for a sales position at NEC in 1986.

It was whilst working at NEC, tasked initially with selling computers and then mobile phones, that he first spotted the potential of mobile phones and the future of mobile communications. At that time, handsets were large, cumbersome and mainly purchased by big business and large organisations. Corporate clients were well catered for but small businesses, the self-employed and the general public had little recourse to the technology. Dunstone realised that mobile phones would eventually become ubiquitous and left NEC in 1989 to start his own business serving this larger market.

Naming his company The Carphone Warehouse (CPW), emphasising a broad range of products and low prices, Dunstone first began selling mobile phones out of his flat on Marylebone Road in 1989. He was 25 years old and had £6,000 of savings to start his business.

In July 2000 the company floated on the London Stock Exchange and, based on an Issue price of 200p, was valued at approximately £1.7 billion.

In 2003 Carphone Warehouse established a subsidiary, TalkTalk, from the assets acquired through the purchase of Opal Telecom in 2002. TalkTalk provided home phone and broadband in the UK market and quickly grew a customer base through the acquisition of one.tel, AOL, Tele2 and the UK arm of Tiscali, from which TalkTalk eventually separated in March 2010.

In December 2019, Dunstone purchased £10 million worth of shares in TalkTalk, meaning he now owns 29.5% of the company's stock.

In May 2008, Best Buy, an American multinational consumer electronics corporation and Carphone Warehouse created a new company, Best Buy Europe. Best Buy acquired 50% of CPW's European and US retail interests for £1.1 billion (or, $2.1 billion). The assets of the newly-formed company comprised CPW's existing retail business, operating from more than 2,400 stores in nine European countries under the Carphone Warehouse and Phone House brands. These included the UK, Belgium, France, Germany, Ireland, The Netherlands, Portugal, Spain and Sweden.

In 2005 Dunstone's salary and bonus amounted to £689,000. In the Sunday Times Rich List 2006 he was listed in 64th place, with an estimated fortune of £830 million.

Dunstone employed the controversial ex-convict Ernest Saunders as a business consultant for Carphone Warehouse prior to its flotation.

=== HBOS ===
In 2005 Dunstone also worked as non-executive director of HBOS PLC, the holding company for Halifax plc, for a salary of £56,000.

=== The Daily Mail General Trust ===
He also served as non-executive director of the Daily Mail and General Trust for a salary of £34,000. DMGT is one of the largest media companies in the UK.

=== Independent Media Distribution PLC (now trading as Group IMD) ===
Dunstone served as non-executive director of Independent Media Distribution PLC between January 2002 - May 2011. IMD is a distributor of TV & radio advertising. Clients include ITV, MTV, L'Oreal and BSkyB.
In 2005, Dunstone's fee was £20,000.

=== The Prince's Trust ===
He is also a council Member of The Prince's Trust and former chairman of its trading subsidiary, the Prince's Trust Trading Ltd. The Prince's Trust is a Registered Charity in England (No. 1079675), while The Prince's Trust Trading Limited (a company registered in England No 3161821) is a wholly-owned subsidiary and trades on behalf of The Prince's Trust. In their 2006 annual report, The Prince's Trust had a gross income of £56.8m and an expenditure of £40.8m.

=== Strike ===
Dunstone is a major backer of discount online estate agency Strike.

== Qualifications ==
Dunstone has 3 A-levels, grades B, C & D. He abandoned his business degree at Liverpool University after taking a gap-year with Torch Computers in Cambridge and then with NEC.

== Honours and awards ==
In 2005 Dunstone was awarded The Daily Telegraph's Business Person of the Year.

He was made a Knight Bachelor in the 2012 Queen's Birthday Honours List 'for services to the mobile communications industry and to charity'. In the 2015 Queen's Birthday Honours List, he was appointed Commander of the Royal Victorian Order (CVO) for his work with The Prince's Trust.

== Personal life ==
Dunstone established a charitable trust, which is the main sponsor of the Fulwood Academy school in Preston, Lancashire.

In November 2013, the Prime Minister appointed Dunstone to the board of trustees of Royal Museums Greenwich. Dunstone was reappointed in 2017 but resigned in February 2021 before the end of his second term. He has donated to both the Labour and Conservative parties.

Dunstone is considered a member of the Chipping Norton set. His hobbies include sailing, and he is the owner of the classic racing yacht Blitzen and the classic 64 m (210 ft) motor yacht Shemara.

== Family ==
Dunstone is married to Celia Gordon Shute, a public relations consultant. The couple has three children.
