= Roger Whiteside =

British businessman (born 1958)

Roger Mark Whiteside OBE (born 13 June 1958) is a British businessman, the former chief executive (CEO) of Greggs, the largest bakery chain in the United Kingdom.

== Early life ==
He was born in Fulham. His father was in the British Army, and he moved to RAF Wildenrath in Germany. He returned to Southampton when he was 11 and attended Saint George Catholic College before moving on to Itchen Sixth Form College, then the University of Leeds, and gained a First Class degree in economics in 1979.

== Career ==
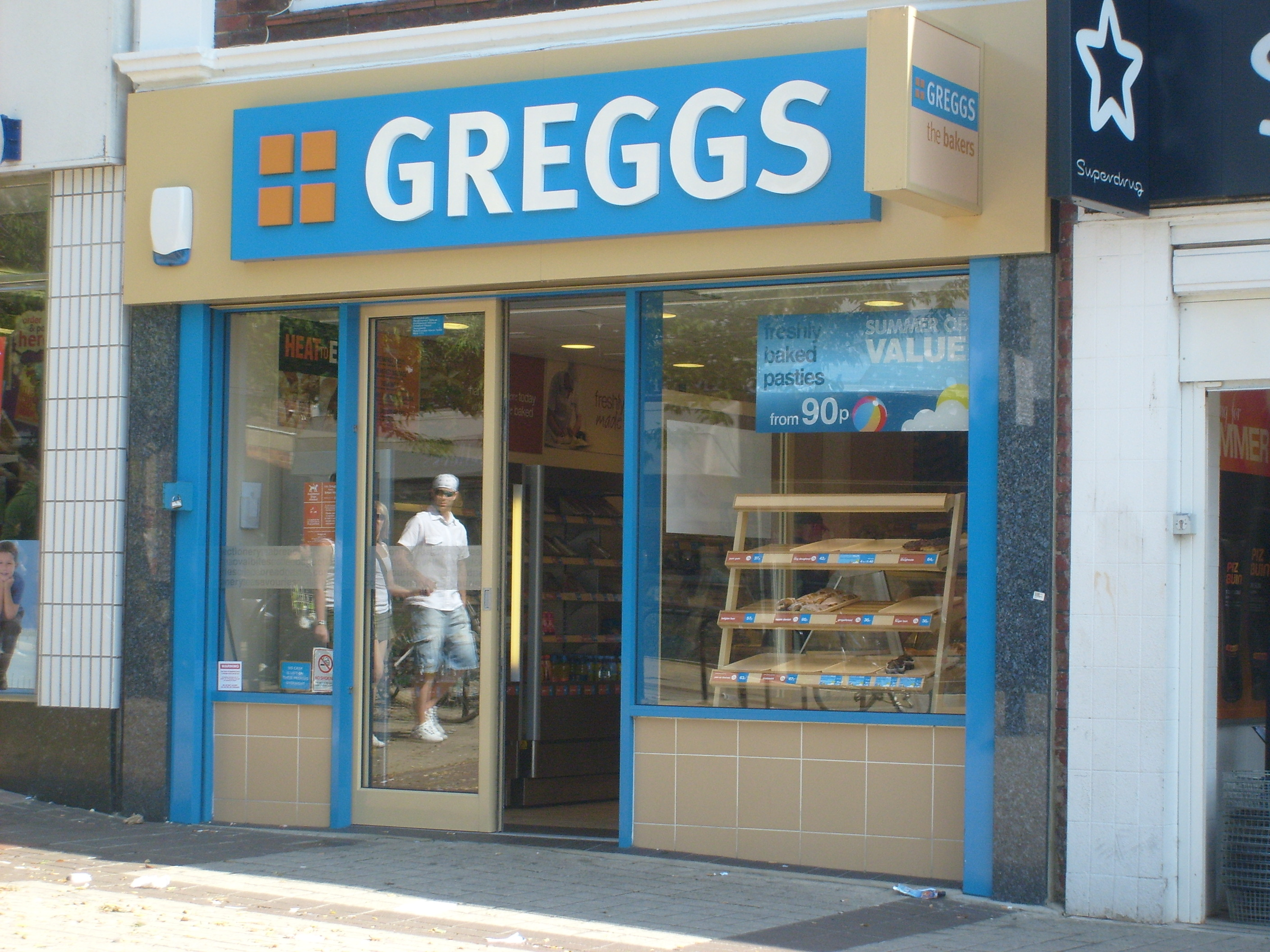
Greggs bakery

=== Marks & Spencer ===
He joined Marks & Spencer in 1979, and worked with Sir Richard Greenbury, and helped to set up the Simply Food division. He became head of the food division at Marks & Spencer, with Nigel Robertson.

=== Ocado ===
He helped to set up Ocado in 2000, with Tim Steiner, Jason Gissing and Jonathan Faiman. He was joint managing director with Nigel Robertson. Ocado sold products from Waitrose.

=== Thresher Group ===
He was Chief Executive at Thresher Group from 2004 to 2007. The company was placed into administration in September 2009.

=== Greggs ===
He became Chief Executive of Greggs on 4 February 2013.

Whiteside stepped down as Greggs CEO in May 2022. Animal rights charity People for the Ethical Treatment of Animals (PETA) honoured Whiteside's contribution to vegan foods, including the Greggs Vegan Sausage Roll, by naming a rescued pig in his honour.

== Personal life ==
He lives in Wargrave, in Berkshire. He is married with two children.

He was appointed an Officer of the Order of the British Empire (OBE) in the 2019 New Year Honours for services to Women and Equality.

Business positions
Preceded by Ken McMeikan	Chief Executive of Greggs; February 2013 - January 2022	Succeeded by Incumbent
Preceded by	Chief Executive of Punch Taverns; August 2011 - January 2013	Succeeded by
Preceded by	Chief Executive of Threshers; 2004 - 2007	Succeeded by
Preceded by	Joint Managing Director of Ocado (with Nigel Robertson); 2000 - November 2003	Succeeded by
Preceded by	Joint Director of Food at Marks & Spencer (with Nigel Robertson): 1999	Succeeded by
