= Bullingdon =

Bullingdon may refer to:

- Bullingdon Club, a socially exclusive student dining club at Oxford University
- HM Prison Bullingdon, a Category B/C prison located in Arncott, Oxfordshire
- Bullingdon Green, a former cricket green in Oxford, associated with the Bullingdon Club
- Bullingdon Hundred, an ancient hundred in the south-east of the county of Oxfordshire
- Bullingdon Rural District, a former local government area in Oxfordshire
