= Nolan Report =

The Nolan Report may refer to:

- The Committee on Standards in Public Life, an advisory body of the UK government.
- The Nolan Report, a committee to investigate clerical child abuse.
