= 1987 Bullingdon Club photograph =

Photo of Oxford University dining club members

1987 photograph of the Bullingdon Club

In 1987, a photograph was taken of uniformed members of the Bullingdon Club featuring many people who went on to hold prominent positions in finance, business, media and government, including future Prime Ministers David Cameron and Boris Johnson. The Bullingdon Club is an all-male private dining club for Oxford University students known for its wealthy membership and unruly behaviour. The image was published in the UK media in 2007 and bolstered criticism of Cameron, who at the time was Leader of the Opposition, for being elitist and out of touch with ordinary people. The copyright holders of the photograph then withdrew permission for the image to be reproduced, which greatly reduced its circulation. Despite this, attempts to broadcast the image have still been made such as the commissioning of a painting of the photograph by the BBC and the photograph being displayed on the front page of the Daily Mirror in 2010. Other photographs of the Bullingdon Club featuring senior Conservative politicians have since emerged. Cameron later expressed his embarrassment over the photograph and remorse for his membership of the Bullingdon Club.

== Background ==
The Bullingdon Club is a private dining club for male Oxford University students. The club is known for members' excessive consumption of alcohol and raucous behaviour, including vandalism of restaurants and student rooms. Formed in the 1700s as a society for cricket and hunting, the club has a long association with the British upper class with former members including Jacob Rothschild, Peter Palumbo and Richard Scott.

Future Prime Minister David Cameron was invited to join the Bullingdon Club at the end of his first year at Oxford University. People who knew Cameron at the time have said that he was not a typical Bullingdon Club member as he had a careful demeanour and was not known to be a heavy drinker. Other future prominent Conservative politicians who were members of the club around this time included Boris Johnson and George Osborne.

== Photograph ==
The photograph shows members of the 1987 Bullingdon Club posed on the steps outside Staircase 2 in Canterbury Quadrangle at Christ Church, Oxford. The men are dressed in the club's uniform of tailcoats, blue ties, beige waistcoats, velvet collars, silk lapels and monogrammed buttons which at the time cost around £1,000.

=== Bullingdon Club members in the photograph ===
Bullingdon Club members in the photograph
| Name | Image | Biographical details | Notes |
|---|---|---|---|
| Matthew Benson | | Benson is from a wealthy merchant banking family and graduated from Oxford in 1988. He started his career working at Morgan Stanley and later worked in property development, consulting and with the Scottish government. | |
| David Cameron | | Cameron was educated at Eton College then graduated from Oxford with a degree in Philosophy, politics and economics. He worked for the Conservative Research Department and was a Special Adviser to the Chancellor of the Exchequer, Norman Lamont and later Home Secretary Michael Howard within the government of John Major. He worked for Carlton TV before becoming an MP at the 2001 United Kingdom general election. He was shadow Secretary of State for Education and Skills and Conservative Policy Review Coordinator under Michael Howard, before being elected leader of the Conservative Party in 2005. He was Prime Minister from 2010 until 2016 and foreign secretary from 2023 until 2024. | |
| Harry Eastwood | | Eastwood attended Eton College before Oxford. He worked in corporate finance at Storehouse after graduating and later became a TV producer whose credits include Jonathan Strange & Mr Norrell. | |
| Ewen Fergusson | | Fergusson is the son of British diplomat and banker Sir Ewen Fergusson and was educated at Rugby School before Oxford. He was a partner at Herbert Smith Freehills. In 2021, he was appointed to a role on the Committee on Standards in Public Life. | |
| Jonathan Ford | | Ford was president of the Bullingdon Club at the time the photograph was taken. He attended Westminster School before Oxford. After graduating, he was a banker at Morgan Grenfell and later became a journalist and editor at the Financial Times. | |
| Sebastian Grigg | | Grigg is the son of Baron Altrincham, Anthony Grigg, and was educated at Eton College. He worked as an investment banker for Credit Suisse and Goldman Sachs as well as his own fund. He unsuccessfully stood for election as a Conservative MP in 1997. In 2021, he became a peer in the House of Lords. | |
| Sebastian James | | James is the third son of Christopher James, 5th Baron Northbourne. He worked at Bain & Company before holding senior executive positions at Dixons Carphone and Boots, where he is CEO. | |
| Boris Johnson | | Johnson was educated at Eton College. He worked as a journalist, before entering politics. He has been Mayor of London and MP in two constituencies, first for Henley and subsequently Uxbridge and South Ruislip. From 2019 until 2022, he was leader of the Conservative Party and Prime Minister. | |
| Ralph Perry-Robinson | | Perry-Robinson is a former child actor who had appeared in Another Country. He studied at the Prince of Wales Institute of Architecture and has worked as an antique bookseller as well as running an architecture and design business. | |
| Marc Rowlands | | Rowlands was educated at Marlborough College. He works as a barrister and specialises in engineering and construction law. His work has included cases pertaining to the cladding on Grenfell Tower. | |

== Publication and withdrawal of permission to use ==
In 2007, the picture came to public attention after it was published in a biography of Cameron by Francis Elliott and James Hanning and in The Mail on Sunday. Circulation of the image occurred close to media coverage regarding Cameron's use of cannabis while at Eton College. The image was seen as proof of how different politicians like Cameron and Johnson were far from normal people and raised questions around Cameron's wealth and class. Labour politician Roy Hattersley called the image "far more embarrassing" than the recent cannabis story. Political commentator Peter Hitchens said it showed Cameron "is not the ordinary bloke that he claims to be". Johnson's sister, Rachel, described the picture as "elitist, arrogant, privileged and of an age that would have little resonance with people on low incomes who didn't go to Eton." Perry-Robinson, who was one of those photographed, described the photograph as "sexy" and "an interesting artefact historically".

The same year the copyright holders, Gillman and Soame, a photography company based in Oxford, withdrew any permission to reproduce the image. This led to accusations that the picture had been covered up. Both the Conservative Party and Gillman and Soame denied collusion around this decision. Gillman and Soame explained their action was part of a "policy decision" not to allow publication of any of their school images. It was suspected that the Labour Party intended to use the image on campaign posters. After authorization to reproduce the image was withdrawn, the photograph was rarely published.

To circumvent the copyright protection, Michael Crick from BBC program Newsnight commissioned a painting of the photograph to use on the program instead. The artist Rona Marsden, who at the time was not aware of the full story regarding the photograph, was hired to create the painting. Newsnight filmed Marsden painting in her studio in Oxford. She travelled with the painting to the BBC's London studios as the paint was drying. The painting has been reproduced by a number of newspapers. Marsden was allowed to keep the painting and has sold prints and tea towels reproducing it. The painting was auctioned in 2016.

The photograph was used on the front cover of the Daily Mirror on the day of the 2010 general election despite the risk of repercussions for breaching copyright laws. Writing in the paper, Tony Parsons said the photograph "is the picture that David Cameron really, really doesn't want you to see". The Daily Mirror argued that the image is "in the public domain and its publication is absolutely in the public interest". In the first edition of the paper, a dummy image was used instead to make sure that their front page was shown in television coverage the evening before the election. The online edition of the Daily Mirror did not use the image and instead linked to a file of the image hosted by the Daily Mail. Writing for The Guardian, Anne Perkins called the front page "one of the great election pages" and said it captured "the sense of distance between privileged and ordinary" that looked to be an on-going issue for Cameron.

== Legacy ==
Cameron has expressed regret over the photograph and his time in the Bullingdon Club. In a 2009 interview with Andrew Marr, he said he was "desperately, very embarrassed" about the photograph. In his biography, Cameron detailed his shame over the "much-reproduced photograph taken of our group of appallingly over-self-confident 'sons of privilege'". Cameron wrote, "If I had known at the time the grief I would get for that picture, of course I would never have joined."

The 2009 docudrama When Boris Met Dave features a scene recreating the photograph, which The Guardian published as a substitute—citing the copyright issue—in a collection of real photographs of Johnson and Cameron together. The programme dramatized the antics of the Bullingdon Club at the time when Johnson and Cameron were members.

A photograph of the Bullingdon Club taken in 1988 was published in the media in 2015. The photograph was found by an Oxford University student newspaper on the wall of Oxford clothes shop Ede & Ravenscroft, which makes the uniforms for the club. The photograph again featured Cameron with other club members posing on steps outside a building. Like the 1987 photograph, the newer photograph was seen as bolstering criticism that Cameron was out of touch with ordinary people. A 1992 photograph of the Bullingdon Club featuring George Osborne and Nathaniel Rothschild was published in multiple newspapers in 2008. The photograph gave the impression of Osborne having had a privileged upbringing. Osborne said it was embarrassing to see the photograph of himself "dressed up like a penguin".

The photograph was recreated by homeless people in 2019 for use in an exhibition by a homelessness charity. In 2020, a group of black Oxford University students took a photograph in a similar style to the photograph. The image was intended to promote higher education to young people.
