= EO Charging =

British provider of charging solutions for electric vehicle fleets

- Company type: Privately held company
- Industry: Electric Vehicle Infrastructure
- Founded: 2014; 12 years ago
- Headquarters: 10 Eastbourne Terrace, London, United Kingdom
- Key people: Richard Staveley, CEO; Charlie Jardine, Founder & President
- Products: Electric Vehicle Charging Solutions
- Number of employees: 24 (2026)
- Website: eocharging.com

EO Charging (EO) is a British company that provides technology-enabled charging infrastructure for electric vehicle fleets. It designs and manufactures EV charging stations and hardware-agnostic cloud-based charge point management software. The company was founded in 2014 and is headquartered in the UK.

EO's technology is used by a number of the world's largest businesses and fleet operators including Amazon, DHL and Tesco, and distributes to over 35 countries around the world. Other customers include Sainsbury's, Uber, Ocado and Go-Ahead. The company also partners with several manufacturers as a preferred charging partner for new vehicle customers, including Mercedes Benz vans. As of December 2021, EO has installed 60,000 charge points mainly in the UK, Ireland and Scandinavia. In 2020 EO's annual revenues were over £15 million. By December 2021 it employed 180 people.

== History ==
EO was established in 2014, originally operating from a barn in Suffolk in the UK. EO derives its name from being originally called “Electricity Online”. EO's business model is primarily focused on vehicle fleets. As such, it developed products such as the EO Genius, a modular system designed to scale alongside a growing electric vehicle fleet.

EO also designs and manufactures charge points for home charging. In 2020, the company launched the EO Mini home charger, which it claims is one of the smallest domestic electric vehicle chargers available, “smaller than an A5 piece of paper.”

In April 2021, EO was chosen by Amazon to design, manufacture and install a network of electric vehicle charging stations in the UK to support the electrification of Amazon's delivery vehicles. It was also appointed to provide its charge point management software and maintenance services for Amazon's fleet across Europe, and is servicing 5,000 charging stations for Amazon.

In October 2021, EO unveiled an integrated end-to-end charging ecosystem for electric commercial vehicle fleets.

In October 2021, EO secured a deal to power Tesco's fleet of electric vans. Also in October 2021, EO launched an eBus division and software platform to support the electrification of bus fleets.

In November 2021, EO announced its expansion into the North American market.

EO entered Administration on 9th April 2026 - With 63 staff terminated with immediate effect.

== Investors ==
In 2018, EO received investment from a private equity investor, Zouk Capital, which helped to fund product development and international expansion.

In 2021, EO announced an agreement for a business combination with First Reserve Sustainable Growth Corp, valuing the company at $675 million. However, this agreement was mutually terminated in March 2022, with the companies citing “unfavourable market conditions” as a factor.
