= Taylor v Secretary of State for Scotland =

- Court: House of Lords
- Decided: 11 May 2000
- Citation: [2000] UKHL 28, [2000] ICR 595
- Transcript: judgment

Court membership
- Judges sitting: Lord Browne-Wilkinson, Lord Lloyd of Berwick, Lord Nolan, Lord Hope of Craighead, Lord Millett

Keywords
- Wrongful dismissal

Taylor v Secretary of State for Scotland [2000] UKHL 28 is a UK labour law case, concerning wrongful dismissal.

== Facts ==
A prison officer's workplace had a collective agreement which stated over-55s would be retired first on three months' notice. His contract also said ‘no one in the service should be discriminated against on the grounds of gender, race, religion, sexual preference, disability or age’. All over-55s were being retired to avoid compulsory redundancies.

== Judgment ==
Lord Hope held that there was no age discrimination, because that term was subject to the term providing for three months' notice. There would only be age discrimination if the employer distinguished between over-55s on grounds of age.

Lord Brown-Wilkinson, Lord Lloyd, Lord Nolan and Lord Millett concurred.

== See also ==
- UK labour law
