= Code For Life =

Platform providing coding resources

Code for Life is a British-based not-for-profit platform that provides free educational resources which teach children how to code in the classroom, or at home.

Rapid Router is Code for Life's browser-based shopping delivery game developed for children aged 5–14 that uses the programming languages Blockly and, in later levels, Python to teach the basic concepts of programming.

Teachers around the world have free access to learning resources as well as an easy-to-use teacher dashboard which enables them to track student progress. The Rapid Router game and resources are mapped to the UK national curriculum computing strand for Key Stages 1–3.

== History ==
Code For Life was founded in 2014 by volunteers at Ocado Technology, after a survey of 250 UK primary schools discovered that the majority did not have adequate access to resources or training to teach the new Computer Science curriculum. It was made open-source in 2015. When the 2020 Coronavirus lockdown forced schools in the UK to close, Code for Life opened up home learning resources to parents and caregivers to help children continue to access essential digital skills. Code for Life has over 350,000 registered users worldwide.

== Rapid Router ==
Code For Life's first programming game, Rapid Router, teaches children the basic concepts of programming by having them guide a van through a series of increasingly complicated routes, giving them feedback on the route taken and the algorithm used.

Players first learn concepts using the visual programming language Blockly before learning to translate those concepts into Python, a popular general-purpose language, to prepare them for further learning.

Over 20,000 teachers use the Rapid Router game in classrooms across 150 countries, and more than 12 million games have been played.
