= When Boris Met Dave =

2009 television film

When Boris Met Dave is a docudrama of 2009 which investigates the shared past of David Cameron and Boris Johnson who, at the time of broadcast, were two of Britain's most influential Conservative Party politicians – Cameron as Conservative leader and Johnson as Mayor of London. Johnson went on to become the Conservative leader as well; with Cameron serving as Prime Minister from 2010 to 2016 and Johnson from 2019 to 2022. The film features interviews with people who knew Cameron and Johnson both at Eton College and Oxford, where they were both members of the Bullingdon Club. It recreates the 1987 Bullingdon Club photograph.

The programme also looks at Johnson's campaign to become president of the Oxford Union and dramatises some of the other key events of their student days. The film was first broadcast on More4 on 7 October 2009, and was later repeated on Channel 4.

== Cast ==
- Anthony Head – narrator
- Christian Brassington – Boris Johnson
- Jonny Sweet – David Cameron
- Christopher Leveaux – James Delingpole

== Interviews ==
Interviews were conducted with numerous individuals including Oxford alumni who attended the university with Cameron and Johnson and contemporary political commentators. The list includes:

- Michael Cockerell
- Toby Young
- James Delingpole
- Rachel Johnson
- Lloyd Evans
- Frank Luntz (American pollster)
- James Hanning (Cameron biographer)
- Francis Elliott (Cameron biographer)
- Andrew Gimson (Johnson biographer)
- Nick Fraser (author of The Importance of Being Eton)

== See also ==
- Miliband of Brothers (2010)
