= Saint George Catholic College =

Voluntary-aided comprehensive school in Southampton, Hampshire, England

Saint George Catholic Voluntary Aided College

Location
- Leaside Way; Southampton, Hampshire, SO16 3DQ; United Kingdom
- Coordinates: 50.947°N 1.382°W

Information
- School type: Voluntary aided Comprehensive
- Motto: Primo fac Prima
- Religious affiliation: Roman Catholic
- Established: 1958
- Local authority: Southampton
- Department for Education URN: 116507 Tables
- Ofsted: Reports
- Executive headteacher: Lyn Bourne
- Head teacher: James Habberley
- Gender: Mixed
- Age: 11 to 16
- Enrolment: 1000+
- Diocese: Portsmouth
- Website: http://www.stgcc.co.uk/

Saint George Catholic VA College (formerly known as St George Catholic School for Girls & Boys) is a Catholic voluntary aided comprehensive secondary school for girls and boys in Swaythling, Southampton, Hampshire.

The college became a mixed school in September 2013 and is operated under the auspices of the Diocese of Portsmouth.

== History ==
St George was founded as a coeducational school and opened its doors to students on 8 September 1958. It was officially opened on Saint George's Day 1959 by the Bishop of Portsmouth John Henry King, Bishop of Portsmouth. The number of students rose to over 600 over the next decade. During the 1970s, St George was a boys-only school.

In March 2012, it was announced that St George would go coeducational in 2013 due to overwhelmingly popular demand. The move was backed by its feeder schools, parents and the Diocese.

In 2018, the school had over 800 pupils.

== School performance and inspection ==
In 2010, Saint George was listed as one of the nation's top 100 improving schools in the GCSEs. The percentage of candidates achieving 5 or more A*-C grades increased by 30%.

In 2020, 87% of Saint George students received grades 9–4 in their subjects and 63% achieved 9–5, with all students gaining places in further education or training.

In 2022, 86% of students achieved grades 9-4 or above in Maths and English, and 73% achieved 9-5.

In 2023, the school was inspected by Ofsted and judged Outstanding.

== Notable former pupils ==
- Paul O'Prey academic leader and author
- Manny Andruszewski, footballer for Southampton F.C.
- David Henson MBE, parasport athlete
- Roger Whiteside OBE, chief executive officer of Greggs
