= Gillian Peele =

British academic and public servant

Professor Gillian Peele MA MPhil FRHistS
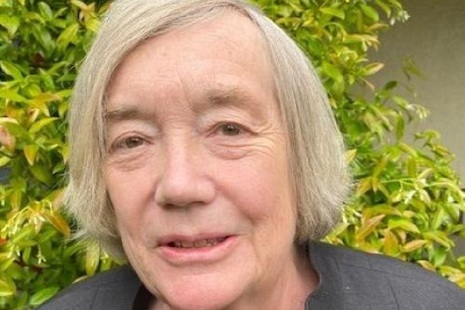
- Professor Gillian Peele
- Born: 1949

Academic work
- Discipline: Politics
- Sub-discipline: British, American and comparative politics
- Notable students: Charles C. W. Cooke

Gillian Peele (born 1949) is a British academic in the field of British, American and comparative politics. She is an emeritus fellow of Lady Margaret Hall, University of Oxford, having retired from teaching in 2016, and in August 2021 began serving a five year term as an independent member on the Committee on Standards in Public Life (CSPL) of the United Kingdom.

== Life ==
Peele was born in 1949. She received education at Durham University, St Anne's College, Oxford, and Nuffield College, Oxford. In 1975 she was appointed as first Fellow and Tutor in Politics at Lady Margaret Hall, Oxford (LMH), and she was also an associate professor in the university's Department of Politics and International Relations. She retired in 2016 and has the status of emeritus professor and fellow.

On 11 December 1980 Peele was on the panel of the BBC Question Time debate programme.

Peele was to serve as an independent on the House of Lords Appointments Commission from 2013 until 2019. In September 2016, Peele retired from her position at LMH as well as that Associate Professor with the Oxford University Department of Politics and International Relations.

Peele, together with Ewen Fergusson, was appointed as an independent member to the UK's Committee on Standards in Public Life (CSPL) in August 2021 for a five-year term. Peele had previously co-authored an analysis on the subject in 2016.

== Selected publications ==
- Hood, Christopher; Peele, Gillian, eds. (1975). The Politics of Reappraisal 1918−1939. London: Macmillan. doi:10.1007/978-1-349-02242-7. ISBN 9781349022427. OCLC 468639667 – via googlebooks.
- Peele, Gillian (2004). Governing the UK: British Politics in the 21st Century - Modern Governments (4 ed.). John Wiley and Sons. ISBN 9780631226819. OCLC 505341540.
- Peele, Gillian (2009). "Revival and Reaction: the Right in Contemporary America". Journal of American Studies. 19 (3): 445–446. doi:10.1017/S0021875800015577. S2CID 145573735.
- Hood, Christopher; King, Desmond; Peele, Gillian, eds. (2014). Forging a discipline : a critical assessment of Oxford's development of the study of politics and international relations in comparative perspective. Oxford University Press. ISBN 9780199682218. OCLC 941680638.
- Hine, David; Peele, Gillian (2018) [2016]. The regulation of standards in British public life : Doing the right thing?. ISBN 9781784997083. OCLC 1085644110.
