= Charles C. W. Cooke =

British-born American journalist (born 1984)

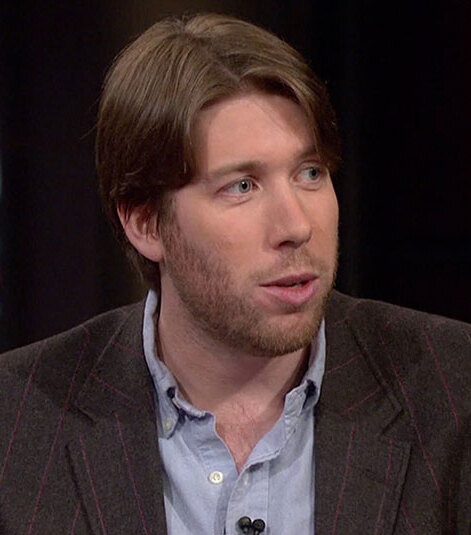
- Cooke in 2020
- Born: Charles Christopher William Cooke; 4 November 1984 (age 41); Cambridge, England
- Citizenship: United Kingdom; United States (from 2018)
- Education: Lady Margaret Hall, Oxford (MA)
- Occupations: Writer, broadcaster
- Years active: 2010–present
- Spouse: Kathryn Murdock (2014–present)
- Children: 2

Charles Christopher William Cooke (born 4 November 1984) is an English-American conservative journalist and a senior writer at National Review Online.

== Early life and education ==
Cooke and his sister grew up in Hemingford Abbots, a small village outside of Cambridge, England.

Cooke graduated from Lady Margaret Hall, Oxford, where he studied modern history and politics under Gillian Peele and Clive Holmes. Before attending Oxford, he attended King's College School, Cambridge, and read for his A-levels at Kimbolton School. Cooke received a Bachelor of Arts degree from Oxford, later promoted to Master of Arts by seniority.

Cooke emigrated to the United States in 2011, working as an intern for National Review. He became a naturalized US citizen on 23 February 2018.

== Career ==
Cooke is the author of The Conservatarian Manifesto. In addition to National Review, he has written for The New York Times, The Washington Post, and the Los Angeles Times.

Alongside Kevin D. Williamson, he hosted the Mad Dogs and Englishmen podcast. He now hosts the Charles C.W. Cooke Podcast.

He has been described by The Atlantic as "perhaps the most confident defender of conservatism younger than George Will" and "a principled conservative who is allergic to anything resembling groupthink."

== Political views and commentary ==
A self-described "conservatarian", Cooke is known for his opposition to censorship, his support for more robust federalism, his disdain for the "imperial presidency," and his objections to the politicization of popular science. On many issues, Cooke leans libertarian, such as his support for legalizing marijuana (and all other drugs), prostitution, and same-sex marriage, and his opposition to both the Patriot Act and the National Security Agency's metadata collection program. Cooke opposes abortion, and has written that his position is rooted in science, rather than religion. A staunch advocate of the right to keep and bear arms, he has described the "collective right" theory of the Second Amendment to the United States Constitution as "utterly farcical" and "the legal equivalent of Moon landing trutherism." Cooke is a constitutional originalist and a critic of the administrative state. He opposes the death penalty.

Cooke has regularly criticized what he has described as the conservative movement's blindspot on race. In 2015, he wrote that slavery and segregation "presented challenges that eclipsed those that were posed during the Revolution ... the crime of the British in America was to deny British conceptions of good government to a people who had become accustomed to it, and to do so capriciously. The crime of white supremacy in the South was, in the words of Ida B. Wells, to 'cut off ears, toes, and fingers, strips off flesh, and distribute portions' of any person whom the majority disliked, and to do so in many cases as a matter of established public policy." In an essay the previous year, Cooke noted that "for most of America's story, an entire class of people was, as a matter of course, enslaved, beaten, lynched, subjected to the most egregious miscarriages of justice, and excluded either explicitly or practically from the body politic. We prefer today to reserve the word 'tyranny' for its original target, King George III, or to apply it to foreign despots. But what other characterization can be reasonably applied to the governments that, ignoring the words of the Declaration of Independence, enacted and enforced the Fugitive Slave Act? How else can we see the men who crushed Reconstruction? How might we view the recalcitrant American South in the early 20th century? 'It' did 'happen here.'"

In May 2021, Cooke authored a piece which sought to debunk both COVID-19 fraud and political harassment claims made by Rebekah Jones that was picked up by outlets such as NPR, Reason, and Business Insider. Cooke's views were supported by Florida state investigators under Governor Ron DeSantis.

Writing in the National Review in June 2021, Cooke confirmed earlier reporting by Maggie Haberman of The New York Times that Donald Trump was telling associates he would be reinstated as president by August. He wrote, in part, "The scale of Trump's delusion is quite startling. This is not merely an eccentric interpretation of the facts or an interesting foible, nor is it an irrelevant example of anguished post-presidency chatter. It is a rejection of reality, a rejection of law, and, ultimately, a rejection of the entire system of American government.

== Personal life ==
Cooke lives in Florida with his wife and two sons. Although his wife and children are Catholic, Cooke describes himself as an atheist. He is a fluent French speaker and a self-confessed Francophile.

== Works ==
- Cooke, Charles C. W. The Conservatarian Manifesto: Libertarians, Conservatives, and the Fight for the Right's Future. New York, Crown Forum, 2015. ISBN 9780804139724
