= Greggs =

Bakery chain in the United Kingdom

Greggs plc
- Formerly: Greggs Bakeries Limited (1951–1983)
- Type: Public
- Traded as: LSE: GRG; FTSE 250 component
- Industry: Food (Food on the go)
- Founded: 1939; 87 years ago in Gosforth, Newcastle upon Tyne, England
- Founder: John Gregg
- Headquarters: Newcastle upon Tyne
- Number of locations: 2,500
- Key people: Ian Durant (Group chairman); Roisin Currie (Chief Executive)
- Products: Sausage rolls; Pastries; Pizzas; Sandwiches; Cakes; Baguettes; Doughnuts
- Revenue: ▲£2,151.2 million (2025)
- Operating income: ▼£187.5 million (2025)
- Net income: ▼£122.2 million (2025)
- Number of employees: 33,000 (2026)
- Website: greggs.co.uk

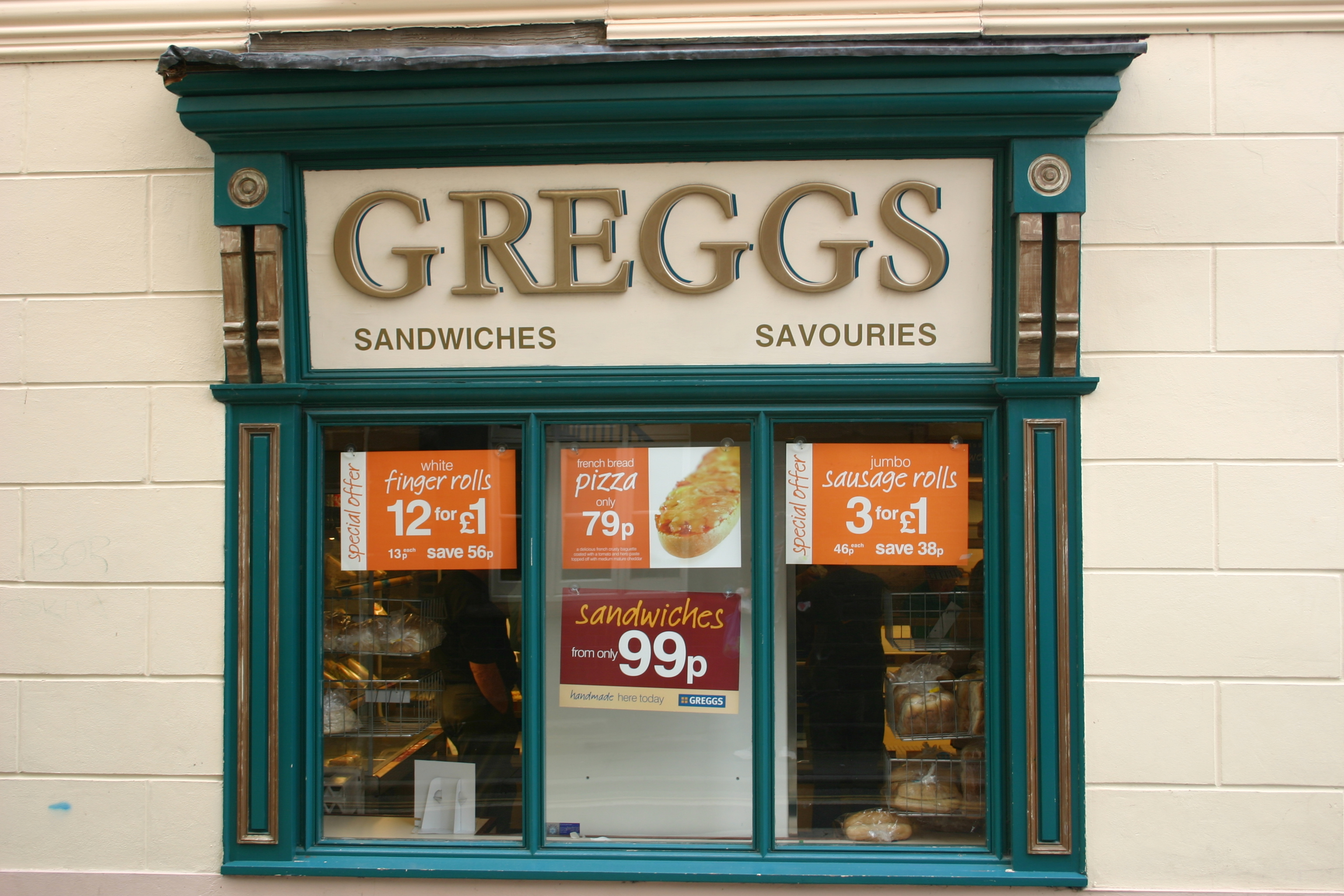
Historic shop front, Greggs, Brecon, Powys, mid Wales (2005)

Greggs plc is a British bakery and fast food chain. It specialises in 'on-the-go' savoury products such as baked goods, sausage rolls, sandwiches and sweet items including doughnuts and vanilla slices. It was founded, and is headquartered, in Newcastle upon Tyne, England. It is listed on the London Stock Exchange (LSE), and is a constituent of the FTSE 250 Index. Originally a high street chain, it has since entered the convenience and drive-through markets.

== History ==
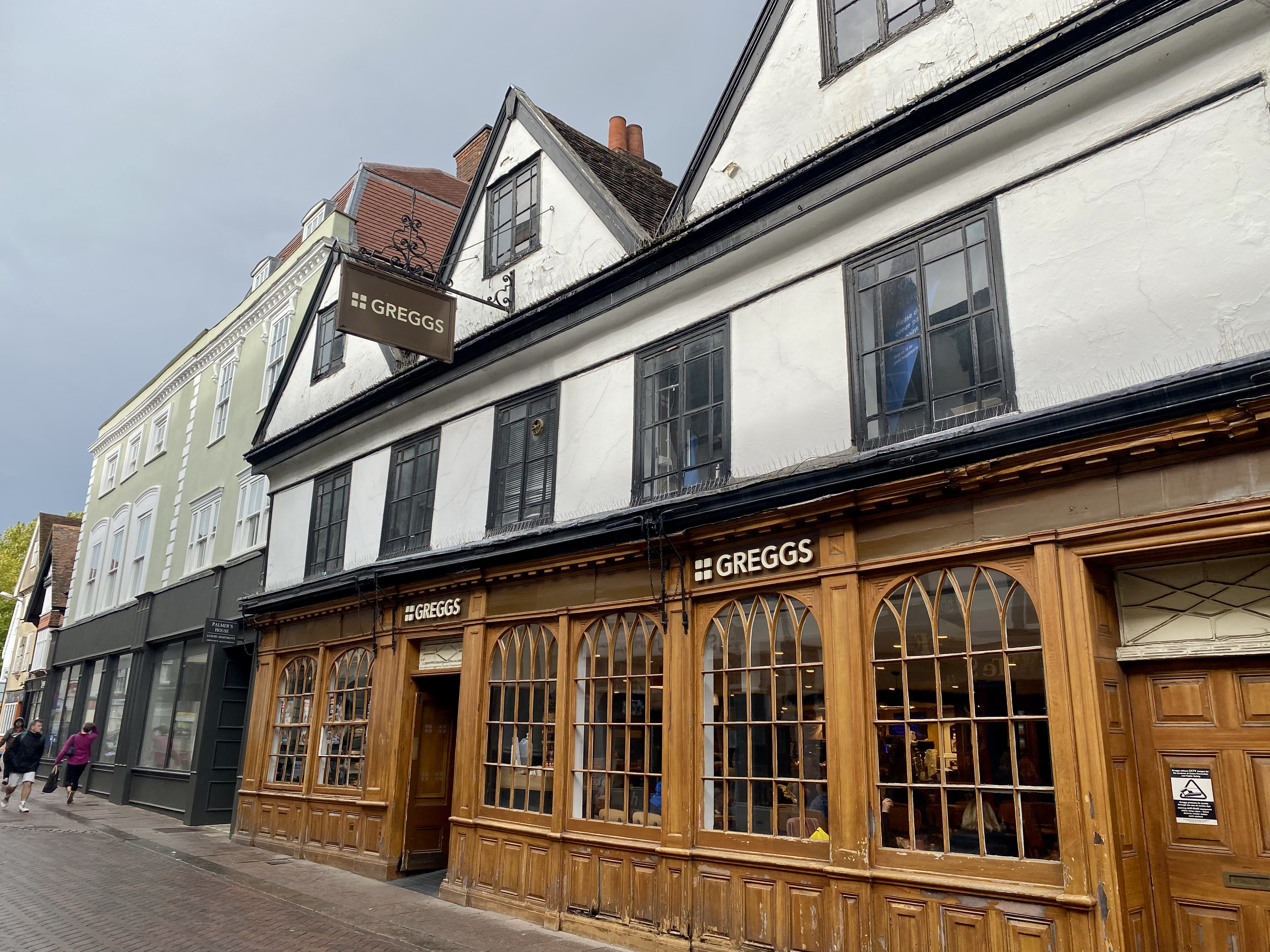
Greggs in a Grade II* listed building on Abbeygate in Bury St Edmunds, Suffolk, England

=== Early history ===
Greggs was founded by John Gregg in 1939. The first shop, which stood on Gosforth High Street, opened in 1951. When Gregg died in 1964, the bakery was taken over by his son, Ian, assisted by his brother Colin.

As Greggs of Gosforth, the first main factory on Christon Road on the Gosforth Industrial Estate opened on 30 April 1968.

Major expansion took place at Greggs in the 1970s, including the acquisitions of other bakeries such as Glasgow-based Rutherglen in 1972, Leeds-based Thurston's in 1974, Broomfields the Bakers, London, Bowketts the Bakers in Kent, Tooks the Bakers (East Anglia) and Price's (Manchester) in 1976.

=== Expansion ===
In 1994, the company acquired the Bakers Oven chain of bakers' shops from Allied Bakeries. In 1999, Greggs rebranded its one hundred Braggs shops as Greggs of the Midlands, and its Leeds-based Thurston chain as Greggs of Yorkshire.

In 2008, Greggs rebranded its 165 Bakers Oven shops as Greggs so they could benefit from its national advertising campaign. The company opened its 1,500th premises, in York, in 2011.

In 2013, Greggs replaced its CEO Ken McMeikan with Punch Taverns CEO Roger Whiteside. McMeikan left the firm for Brake Bros.

In 2013, Greggs began to transition out of the bakery market, reasoning that it could not compete with supermarkets on that front. Instead, the company switched to focusing solely on "food on the go", which represented 80% of its business. Many of its stores now open earlier and close later, in order to target those going to and coming back from work, expanding its breakfast menu, and discontinuing the sale of bread and scones in many of its stores.

In 2014, the company requested help from Google when an image of the Greggs logo, altered to include a parodic fake slogan referring to the firm's customers as "scum", was presented in Google search results as the actual company logo – falling foul of imperfections in the PageRank algorithm. The firm's lighthearted social media response, which included a tweet sent to Google's official Twitter account offering doughnuts in exchange for fixing the problem, was noted as a "lesson in Twitter crisis management".

In 2016, Greggs moved their head office from Jesmond, Newcastle upon Tyne to Quorum Business Park, Longbenton, North Tyneside.

In that same year, Colin Gregg was accused of preying upon children, partly using his philanthropic role within the company. He was convicted in March 2017 on nine counts of indecent assault and was sentenced to imprisonment until at least 2030.

In 2020, all shops closed in response to the COVID-19 pandemic.

In 2022, Greggs opened its largest location in a Primark store in Birmingham. A queue formed outside the shop 30 minutes before the grand opening, with some people running under the barriers as they were opened. A collaborative clothing range, "Greggs X Primark", was also released.

In 2026, the company became the largest branded coffee operator in the UK, with 2,737 outlets, compared with Costa Coffee's 2,707.

=== COVID-19 impact ===
In response to the ongoing disruption, Greggs was forced to close all stores on 24 March 2020, furloughing most of its employees. On 24 April 2020, it was decided Greggs were carrying out a controlled trial of 20 stores in Newcastle with regard to safety measures taken in response to COVID-19. This was later called off; due to the amount of press coverage it was deemed dangerous and trials were carried out behind closed doors at undisclosed locations throughout the UK.

After a successful trial Greggs announced it was opening 800 shops in June 2020, with all the new measures in place including Perspex acrylic screens, social distancing markers and door staff. The company also said that reduced trading hours and a reduced menu would be in place until further notice. Greggs opened all shops with the new measures near the end of July 2020. Some food items were reintroduced to the menu in September 2020. In November 2020, the company announced it would be cutting 820 jobs due to the COVID-19 pandemic that affected the company's sales.

== Senior leadership ==
- Group Chairman: Ian Durant (since May 2013)
- Chief Executive: Roisin Currie (since May 2022)

=== List of former chairmen ===
1. Ian Gregg (1984–2002)
2. Derek Netherton (2002–2013)

=== List of former chief executives ===
This post was formerly known as Managing Director.

1. John Gregg (1939–1964)
2. Ian Gregg (1964–1984)
3. Sir Michael Darrington (1984–2008)
4. Ken McMeikan (2008–2012)
5. Roger Whiteside (2013–2022)

== Operations ==
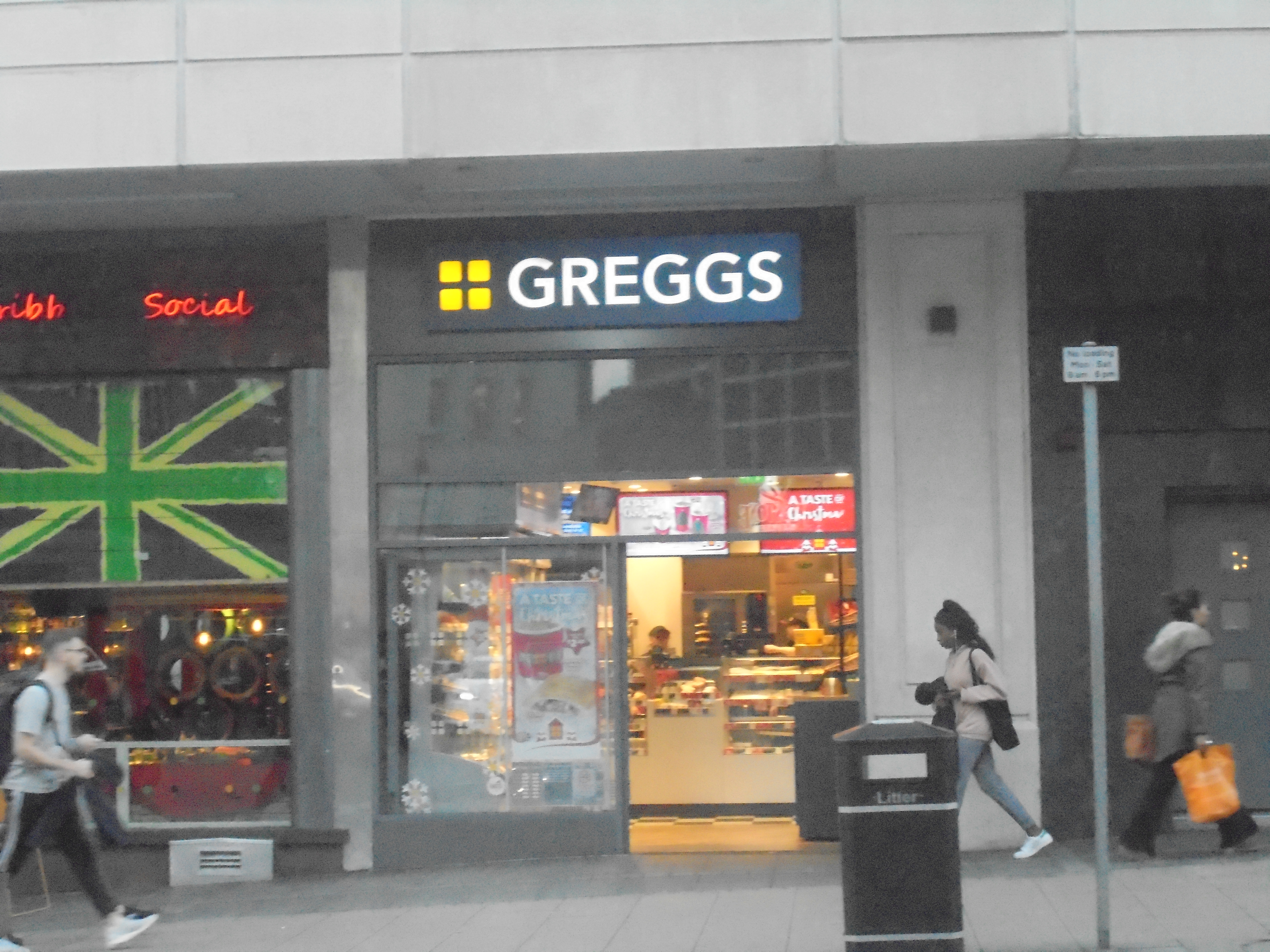
A contemporary Greggs branch in Leeds, West Yorkshire

In 2019, the chain had over 2,000 outlets, nine regional bakeries that make products local to the area (such as Scotch pie in Scotland), and also employed 22,000 staff. Some items are only sold in particular regions. The company also sells some of its products – such as bakes, melts and pasties – through the supermarket chain Iceland.

=== Delivery service and Click & Collect ===
In October 2016, Greggs announced that it would be launching a delivery service on a trial basis, with plans to implement it nationwide if the trial proved to be successful. The initial trial was held in Cobalt Park in North Tyneside, and the next trial phase encompassed the city's other 29 Greggs stores.

=== Greggs Drive Thru and 24-hour openings ===
In June 2017, Greggs opened their first drive-through, at Irlam Gateway Service Station in Salford. Subsequent drive-through outlets opened in Ashby-de-la-Zouch, Bradford, Blackburn, and Newcastle. Greggs are trialling certain drive-through stores being open 24 hours a day.

In 2023, Greggs was involved in a dispute over operating 24 hours in Leicester Square after the location was refused an overnight licence by Westminster City Council. Greggs appealed and was granted permission for late-night opening, but not 24 hours. In July 2023, the company applied for licences for 24 hour opening at sites in Canterbury and Liverpool.

=== Greggs Moment Stores ===
In September 2011, Greggs opened its first Greggs Moment, a 104-seater coffee shop, in its home town of Newcastle on Northumberland Street. This store was then followed by one in the nearby MetroCentre in August 2012, with five outlets in operation by February 2013. In August 2013, the company announced that it would discontinue its attempt to enter the coffee market, and instead focus on selling coffee from its existing stores.

=== Greggs Outlet ===
Greggs also has a small number of outlet shops in Northern and Central England, Scotland and two in Wales, selling unsold stock, mis-shapes and factory rejects at a discounted price, under the name Greggs Outlet. They were started in 1972 in Arthur's Hill, Newcastle under the name of the Greggs 'Seconds' shop.

=== Bitesize Greggs ===
Greggs opened a new chain of smaller shops called "Bitesize Greggs" starting with Sevenoaks railway station on 7 November 2025. The goal was to setup branches of the chain in areas that have high footfall, such as train station platforms, where space is limited. The announcement was made following the business reporting it had been negatively impacted by high temperatures over the summer of 2025.

== Products ==
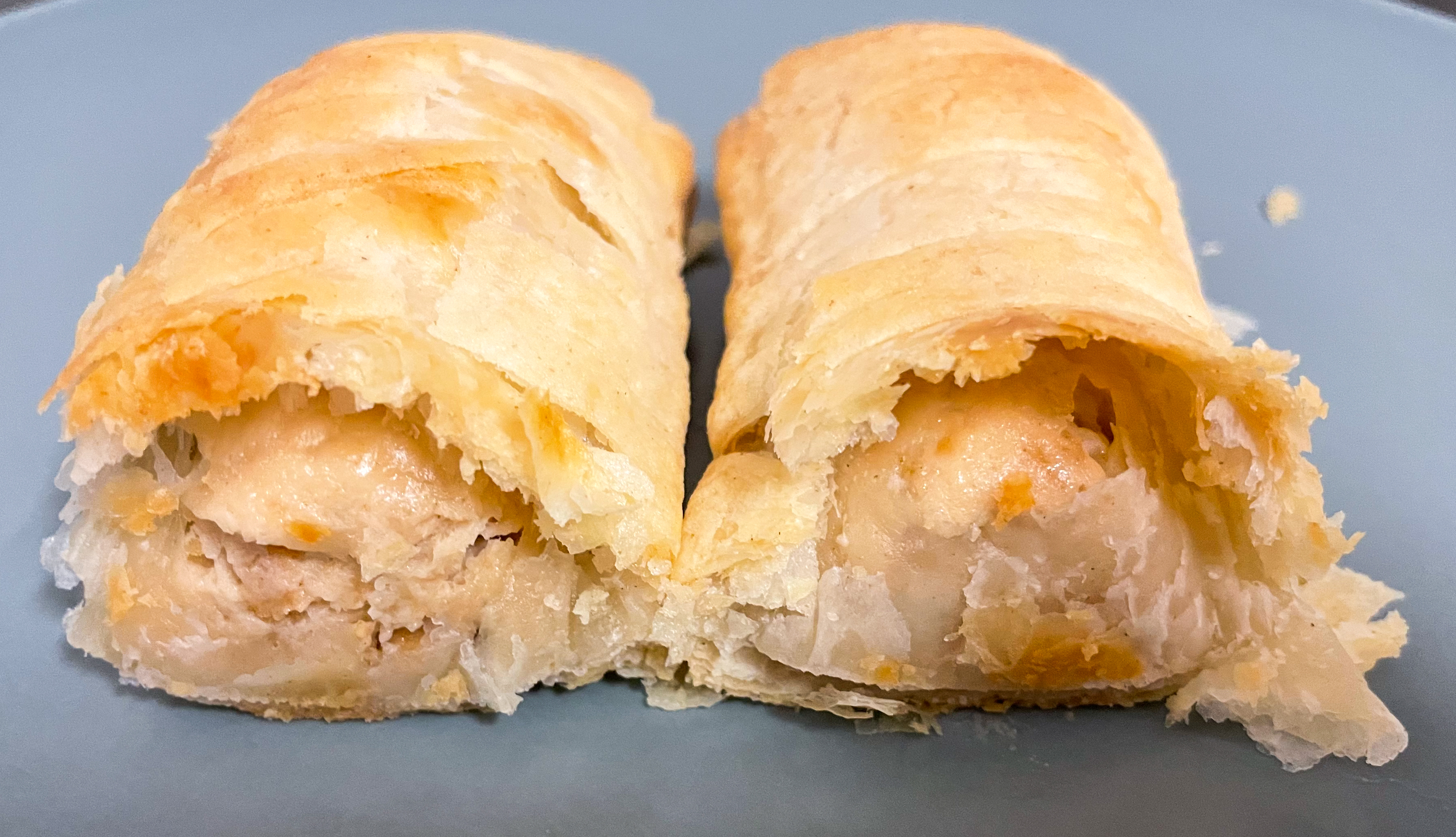
The Greggs meat-free sausage roll (home-baked)

Products include sausage rolls, vegan sausage rolls, bacon rolls, croissants, pains au chocolat, sandwiches, and soups.

In Channel 4's Tricks of the Restaurant Trade, it was discovered that Greggs' cream of tomato soup contained much more sugar than was disclosed in its nutritional information.

== Marketing ==
In July 2002, American actress, singer, and former model Milla Jovovich, a fan of the store and its pasties, said that she would be willing to become the "face of Greggs" in a new marketing campaign if the firm approached her. However, no such approach was made.

=== Greggs Rewards ===
In February 2014, Greggs launched an electronic loyalty scheme app called "Greggs Rewards".

=== Pasty tax ===
In March 2012, Chancellor of the Exchequer George Osborne proposed to simplify the taxing of takeaway food. In the United Kingdom, most food intended to be cooked and eaten at home is zero rated, meaning that businesses do not have to charge their customers the standard value-added tax (VAT) on those products.

With the pasty tax, any food besides freshly baked bread which is sold while above room temperature would be subject to the 20% VAT charge with no exception for intended serving temperature. Chairman of the company, Derek Netherton warned that such a tax would lead to "further unemployment, high street closures and reduced investment". Greggs participated in a campaign to reverse this decision, which became known as the "pasty tax" or "Pasty Gate".

=== Greggs: More Than Meats the Pie ===
An eight part documentary series, called Greggs: More than Meats the Pie, which goes behind the scenes of the bakery and all its areas, was broadcast on Sky1 and Sky1 HD in April 2013. Sky revealed the documentary programme's first episode was Sky1's number one original show in April, with a final total of 1.27 million viewers.

== Animal welfare ==
In 2022, Greggs signed the Better Chicken Commitment (BCC), which calls for the more ethical treatment and slaughter of farmed chickens. As of 2024, 86.6% of its chickens were reared with a stocking density of 30kg per square metre or less. Greggs aimed to reach 100% by the end of 2025. As of February 2026, despite some major restaurant chains dropping the commitment, Greggs remained a member of the Better Chicken Commitment.

In 2024, Greggs was a signatory to a Compassion in World Farming letter to the UK government, calling on the government to ban the use of cages for egg-laying hens in UK production and in UK imports.
