= Bullingdon Hundred =

Ancient hundred in the south-east of the county of Oxfordshire

Coordinates: 51.7394°N 1.1907°W

Bullingdon was a hundred in the county of Oxfordshire, covering an area to the east of Oxford. It took its name from the hamlet of Bullingdon Green, in the parish of Horspath (just north of the modern Horspath Sports Ground), where the hundred court originally met.

The Domesday Book of 1096 describes the many parishes of Bullingdon hundred as being dependencies of the royal manor of Headington. The hundred included:
Cowley, Nuneham (Courtenay), Cuddesdon, Headington, Ambrosden, Stanton (St John), Merton, Elsfield, Garsington, Iffley, Waterperry, Beckley, Holywell, the Baldons – (including (Little) Baldon, (Marsh) Baldon and (Toot) Baldon), Piddington, Oxford, Sandford (-on-Thames), Holton, Horspath, (Wood) Eaton, Walton, Thomley, Woodperry, (Lower and Upper) Arncott, Forest Hill, Chippinghurst, Shotover, Stowford, and Wheatley.

For over one thousand years, reigning monarchs used portions of the royal manor of Headington to reward families or individuals, so Bullingdon hundred and additional regions included in the manor are well documented. The ultimate authority of the current monarch over the royal manor of Headington was important to maintain, because of its historic attachment to previous rulers of Britain dating back to Roman rule and even earlier.

Bullingdon was often described as a double hundred, with a second hundred court meeting in the northern section of the hundred at Shotteslawa (Scēot's tumulus) – past the hundred boundary of later times in the neighbouring township of Ambrosden. The original site of the northerly hundred court has been assumed to be modern Mount Pleasant and the ancient Graven Hill. Shotteslawa is no longer mentioned after the reign of Richard I (d. 1199).

As the City of Oxford grew in population, a portion of Bullingdon hundred became known as North Gate hundred, first mentioned in the eyre of 1247. From Stephen's reign (1135–54) until at least 1281, the soke of the manor of Headington was described as the double hundred of Bullington and Northgate. The area considered as within Northgate decreased over the following centuries.

The Black Death of 1348-50 killed nearly half the population of England and became endemic, recurring in 1361–62, 1369, 1379–83 and 1389–93. Bullingdon Hundred was depopulated. The Headington Court Roll of 1388 describes actions in the manor of Headington which included incidences in Bullingdon.

A 7 Henry VI (1428-1429) Hundred Court Roll from Bullington is in the Oxfordshire archives.

Bullington Hundred was of continuing importance during the 17th century.

Hundreds gradually lost their administrative importance, especially through the nineteenth century. Whilst the hundreds were never formally abolished, they had no administrative functions after 1886 and were therefore effectively abandoned.

The Bullingdon name was reused for the Bullingdon Rural District which was created in 1932. That district covered an area to the east and south-east of Oxford which was similar, but not identical, to the former hundred. Bullingdon Rural District was abolished in 1974, becoming part of South Oxfordshire.

The name lives on in the form of HM Prison Bullingdon, a Category B/C prison in the village of Arncott in Oxfordshire. Bullingdon Hundred is a past location of the annual Bullingdon Club point-to-point race.
