= John Gregg (baker) =

English businessman, best known as the founder of Greggs

- Born: John Robson Gregg; 9 November 1909; Newcastle upon Tyne, England
- Died: 23 September 1964 (aged 54); Northumberland, England
- Occupation: Businessman
- Known for: Founder of Greggs
- Children: 3

John Robson Gregg (9 November 1909 – 23 September 1964) was an English businessman, best known as the founder of Greggs, the United Kingdom's largest bakery chain.

== Biography ==
Gregg was born at Canada Street, Newcastle upon Tyne, in 1909 to John George Gregg (1874 – 1932) and Mary Ann Gregg (née Marrs; 1878 – ?). At the age of 14, he joined the family egg and yeast business. He would make deliveries on his pushbike to local working-class homes. He acquired a van in the 1930s.

Gregg was called up to serve in the British Army during World War II and during this time his wife bought a second van and started distributing confectionery as well as ingredients for bread. In 1939, he founded Greggs, a family bakery store in Tyneside, with its first shop opening in 1951 on Gosforth high street. By 1953, the business consisted of one shop and six vans selling products from the bakery.

He died of lung cancer in 1964. After his death, his son, Ian Gregg (b. 1939), took over the family business.

== Personal life ==
He was married to Elsie (née Davis; 1909 – 1972) and they had two sons, Colin and Ian, and one daughter. He was also known by the name "Jack".

He was a Freemason.
