= Bullingdon Club =

Exclusive society at Oxford University

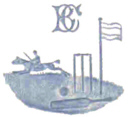
- Emblem of the Bullingdon Club
- Named after: Bullingdon Hundred
- Founded: 1780
- Purpose: Private dining club
- Headquarters: Oxford University

The Bullingdon Club is a private all-male dining club for Oxford University students. It is known for its wealthy members, grand banquets, and bad behaviour, including vandalism of restaurants, hotels, students' rooms, commercial and private banks. The club selects its members not only on the grounds of wealth and willingness to participate but also by reference to their education.

The Bullingdon was originally a sporting club, dedicated to cricket and horse-racing, although club dinners gradually became its principal activity. Membership is expensive, with tailor-made uniforms, regular gourmet hospitality, and a tradition of on-the-spot payment for damage. Some members have gone on to become leading figures within British society and the political establishment. Former members include two kings of the United Kingdom of Great Britain and Northern Ireland (Edward VII and Edward VIII), three prime ministers (David Cameron, Archibald Primrose, 5th Earl of Rosebery, and Boris Johnson), and two chancellors of the Exchequer (George Osborne and Lord Randolph Churchill).

The Bullingdon is often featured in fiction and drama.

== History ==
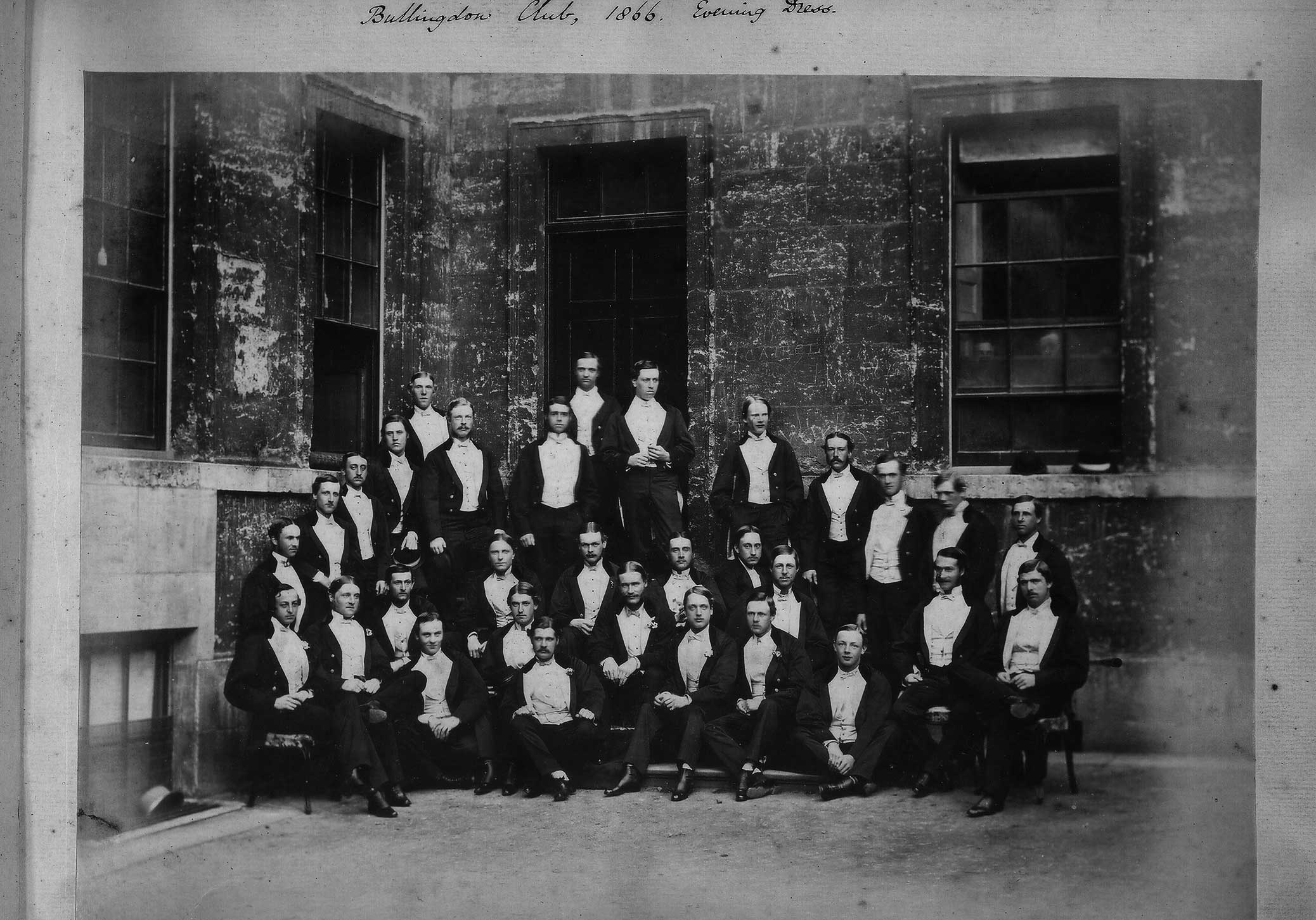
Members of the Bullingdon Club in 1866

The Bullingdon Club was founded more than 200 years ago. Petre Mais claims it was founded in 1780 and was limited to 30 men, and Viscount Long, who was a member in 1875, described it as "an old Oxford institution, with many good traditions". Originally it was a fox hunting and cricket club, and Thomas Assheton Smith the Younger is recorded as having batted for the Bullingdon against Marylebone Cricket Club in 1796. In 1805 cricket at Oxford University "was confined to the old Bullingdon Club, which was expensive and exclusive". This foundational sporting purpose is attested to in the club's symbol. Harry Mount suggests that the name itself derives from this sporting background, proposing that the club is named after the Bullingdon Hundred, a past location of the annual Bullingdon Club point-to-point race. This origin of the club is marked by an annual breakfast at the Bullingdon point to point.

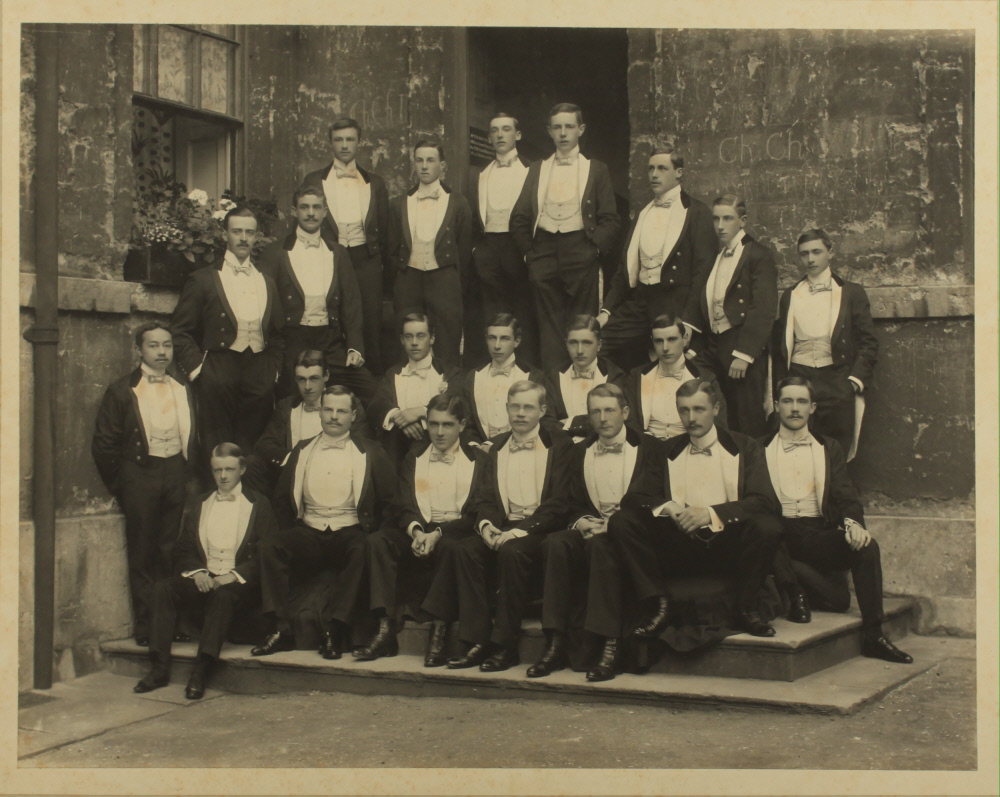
Members of the Bullingdon Club in 1900

The Wisden Cricketer reports that the Bullingdon is "ostensibly one of the two original Oxford University cricket teams but it actually used cricket merely as a respectable front for the mischievous, destructive or self-indulgent tendencies of its members". By the late 19th century, the present emphasis on dining within the club began to emerge. Long attested that in 1875 "Bullingdon Club [cricket] matches were also of frequent occurrence, and many a good game was played there with visiting clubs. The Bullingdon Club dinners were the occasion of a great display of exuberant spirits, accompanied by a considerable consumption of the good things of life, which often made the drive back to Oxford an experience of exceptional nature".

A report of 1876 relates that "cricket there was secondary to the dinners, and the men were chiefly of an expensive class". The New York Times told its readers in 1913 that "The Bullingdon represents the acme of exclusiveness at Oxford; it is the club of the sons of nobility, the sons of great wealth; its membership represents the 'young bloods' of the university". During the Second World War, an extension of the club was founded at Colditz Castle for imprisoned officers who had been members of the club while at Oxford.

Former pupils of public schools such as Eton, Harrow, St. Paul's, Stowe, Radley, Oundle, Shrewsbury, Rugby and Winchester form the bulk of its membership.

=== 2000s ===
In the 21st century the Bullingdon is primarily a dining club, although a vestige of the club's sporting links survives in its support of an annual point to point race. The Club President, known as the "General", presents the winner's cup, and the club members meet at the race for a champagne breakfast. The club also meets for an annual Club dinner. Guests may be invited to either of these events. There may also be smaller dinners during the year to mark the initiation of new members or in celebration of other occasions. The club often books private dining rooms under an assumed name, as most restaurateurs are cautious of the club's reputation as being the cause of considerable drunken damage during the course of their dinners.

In 2007, a photograph of the Bullingdon Club taken in 1987 was discovered. It made British headlines because two of the posing members, Boris Johnson and David Cameron, had gone on to careers in politics and at the time were, respectively, Conservative candidate for Mayor of London and Leader of the Conservative party. The copyright owners have since declined to grant permission to use the picture.

Following negative media attention and the club's apparent depiction in the play Posh and its film adaptation The Riot Club—membership has supposedly dwindled. In 2016 it was claimed that only between four and six members were left, all of them postgraduates, and that no new undergraduate members joined the previous year. Many Oxford students cited an unwillingness to be associated with "ostentatious wealth celebration".

In June 2017, members of the club attempting to shoot their annual Club Photo on the steps of Christ Church were escorted out by college porters for not securing permission for the shoot. Nearby non-member students heckled the club as they left, with one even playing "Yakety Sax" (the theme song for The Benny Hill Show).

== Reputation ==
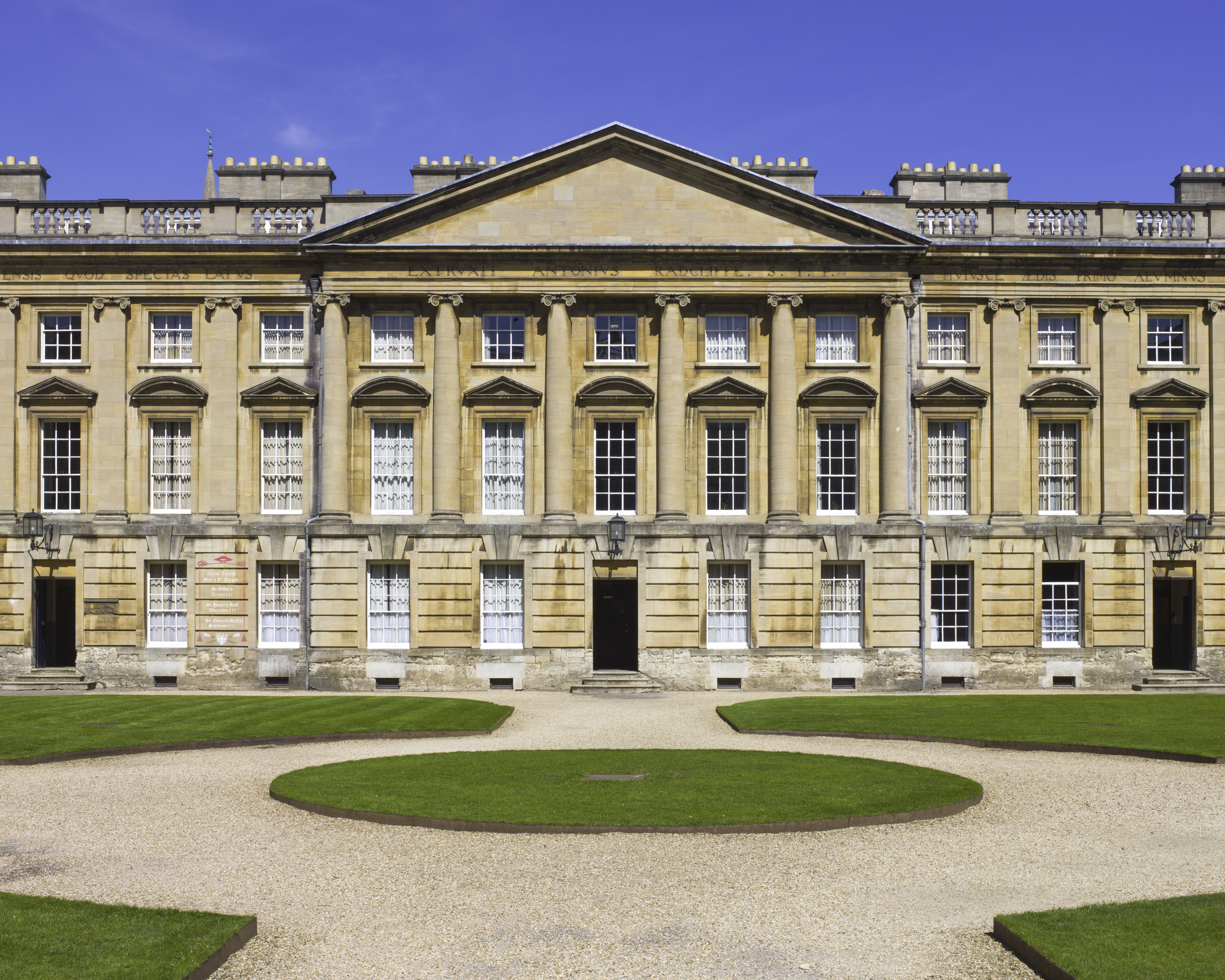
Peckwater Quad, vandalised in 1894 and 1927

The club has always been noted for its wealthy members, grand banquets, and boisterous rituals, including the vandalisation of restaurants, public houses, and college rooms, complemented by a tradition of on-the-spot payment for damage. Its ostentatious displays of wealth attract controversy, since some former members have subsequently achieved high political positions, notably the former British Prime Minister David Cameron, former Chancellor of the Exchequer George Osborne and the former Prime Minister Boris Johnson.

A number of episodes over many decades have provided anecdotal evidence of the club's behaviour. On 12 May 1894, after dinner, Bullingdon members smashed almost all the glass of the lights and 468 windows in Peckwater Quad of Christ Church, along with the blinds and doors of the building, and again on 20 February 1927. As a result of such events, the club was banned from convening within 15 miles (24 km) of Oxford.

While still Prince of Wales, Edward VIII had a certain amount of difficulty in getting his parents' permission to join the Bullingdon on account of the club's reputation. He eventually obtained it only on the understanding that he would never join in what was then known as a "Bullingdon blind", a euphemistic phrase for an evening of drink and song. On hearing of his eventual attendance at one such evening, Queen Mary sent him a telegram requesting that he remove his name from the club.

Andrew Gimson, biographer of Boris Johnson, reported about the club in the 1980s: "I don't think an evening would have ended without a restaurant being trashed and being paid for in full, very often in cash. [...] A night in the cells would be regarded as being par for a Buller man and so would debagging anyone who really attracted the irritation of the Buller men."

In December 2005, Bullingdon Club members smashed 17 bottles of wine, "every piece of crockery," and a window at the 15th-century White Hart pub in Fyfield, Oxfordshire. The dinner was organised by Alexander Fellowes, son of Baron Fellowes and nephew to Diana, Princess of Wales; four members of the party were arrested. A further dinner was reported in 2010 after damage to Hartwell House, a country house in Buckinghamshire.

The Bullingdon has been mentioned in the debates of the House of Commons in order to draw attention to excessive behaviour across the British class spectrum, and to embarrass prominent Conservative Party politicians who are former members of the Bullingdon. Johnson has since tried to distance himself from the club, calling it "a truly shameful vignette of almost superhuman undergraduate arrogance, toffishness and twittishness."

== Dress ==
Bullingdon Colours

The club's colours are sky blue and ivory. Members dress for their annual Club dinner in bespoke tailored tailcoats in dark navy blue, with a matching velvet collar, offset with ivory silk lapel revers, brass monogrammed buttons, a mustard waistcoat, and a sky blue bow tie. There is also a Club tie, which is sky blue striped with ivory. These are all provided by the Oxford branch of court tailors Ede and Ravenscroft. In 2007 the full uniform was estimated to cost £3,500. Traditionally when they played cricket, members "were identified by a ribbon of blue and white on their straw hats, and by stripes of the same colours down their flannel trousers".

== Relationship with the university ==
The Bullingdon is not currently registered with the University of Oxford, but members are drawn from among the members of the University. On several occasions in the past, when the club was registered, the University proctors suspended it on account of the rowdiness of members' activities, including suspensions in 1927 and 1956. John Betjeman wrote in 1938 that "quite often the Club is suspended for some years after each meeting". While under suspension, the club has met in relative secrecy.

The club was active in Oxford in 2008-9, although not registered with the University. In his retirement speech as proctor, Donald Fraser, a professor of geology, noted an incident which, not being on University premises, was outside their jurisdiction: "some students had taken habitually to the drunken braying of 'We are the Bullingdon' at 3 a.m. from a house not far from the Phoenix Cinema. But the transcript of what they called the wife of the neighbour who went to ask them to be quiet was written in language that is not usually printed".

In October 2018, the Oxford University Conservative Association (OUCA) banned members of the Bullingdon Club from holding office within the Association. OUCA president Ben Etty stated that the club's "values and activities had no place in the modern Conservative Party'". This decision was overturned several weeks later "on a constitutional technicality", although Etty was confident that "that ban will be re-proposed very soon". The ban was later re-implemented on appeal to OUCA's Senior Member and remains in effect.

== Photographs of club members ==
A number of the club's annual photographs have emerged over the years, with each giving insight into its past members.

A photograph taken in 1987 depicting David Cameron and Boris Johnson among other members of the club, including Jonathan Ford of the Financial Times, and retail CEO Sebastian James is the best-known example. In an interview with the BBC's Andrew Marr, David Cameron said that the photograph was an embarrassment. BBC Two's Newsnight commissioned a painting to recreate the photograph because the photographers who own the copyright objected to its being published on commercial grounds.

A photograph taken in 1988, also depicting the future British Prime Minister David Cameron, this time as Club President and standing in the centre of the group, later emerged. It was found by the student newspaper, VERSA, among over a dozen other photographs of the club dated between 1950 and 2010 hanging on the wall of the tailor that is believed to have made the members' suits, and led to a number of other past members being identified. Gillman and Soame, the photographers who own the copyright to the image, withdrew permission for it to be reproduced. VERSA, which discovered the photographs, commissioned sketches to reproduce the scenes depicted in them.

A photograph of the club taken in 1992 depicted George Osborne, Nathaniel Rothschild, David Cameron's cousin Harry Mount and Ocado founder Jason Gissing.

In 2013, a new photograph emerged of club members flying by private jet to a hunting expedition in South Africa. Pictured in the photograph are Michael Marks, Cassius Clay, Nicholas Green, Timothy Aldersly, Charles Clegg and George Farmer – the son of the former treasurer of the Conservative Party Michael Farmer, Baron Farmer.

== Documentary ==
David Cameron's and Boris Johnson's period in the Bullingdon Club was examined in the UK Channel 4 docu-drama When Boris Met Dave, broadcast on 7 October 2009 on More 4. An Observer Magazine article in October 2011 reviewed George Osborne's membership of the club.

== Cultural references ==
The Bullingdon is satirised as 'the Bollinger Club' (Bollinger being a notable brand of champagne) in Evelyn Waugh's novel Decline and Fall (1928), where it has a pivotal role in the plot: the mild-mannered hero is blamed for the Bollinger Club's destructive rampage through his college and is sent down. Tom Driberg claimed that the description of the Bollinger Club was a "mild account of the night of any Bullingdon Club dinner in Christ Church. Such a profusion of glass I never saw until the height of the Blitz. On such nights, any undergraduate who was believed to have 'artistic' talents was an automatic target."

Waugh mentions the Bullingdon by name in Brideshead Revisited. In talking to Charles Ryder, Anthony Blanche relates that the Bullingdon attempted to "put him in Mercury" in Tom Quad one evening, Mercury being a large fountain in the centre of the Quad. Blanche describes the members in their tails as looking "like a lot of most disorderly footmen", and goes on to say: "Do you know, I went round to call on Sebastian next day? I thought the tale of my evening's adventures might amuse him." This could indicate that Sebastian was not a member of the Bullingdon, although in the 1981 TV adaptation, Lord Sebastian Flyte vomits through the window of Charles Ryder's college room while wearing the famous Bullingdon tails. The 2008 film adaptation of Brideshead Revisited likewise clothes Flyte in the club tails during this scene, as his fellow revellers chant "Buller, Buller, Buller!" behind him.

A fictional Oxford dining society inspired by clubs like the Bullingdon forms the basis of the play Posh by Laura Wade, staged in April 2010 at the Royal Court Theatre, London. Membership of the club while still a student is depicted in the play as giving a student admission to a secret and corrupt network of influence within the Tory Party later in life. The play was later adapted into the 2014 film The Riot Club.

The TV series Peep Show referenced the Bullingdon Club in the first episode of its final series.

The 2022 Netflix series Anatomy of a Scandal, based on a novel of the same name by Sarah Vaughan, used the Bullingdon Club as inspiration for the fictional club featured within the story. The fictional club is known as 'the Libertines'.

In one episode of Frasier, characters Frasier Crane and Alan Cornwall talk about how they tried to join the Bullingdon Club during their Oxford days, but their plans were cut short when after getting blackout drunk, they snuck into the library and tried to steal Oscar Wilde's walking stick, only to end up getting tackled by a group of librarians and forever banned from the club.

In the HBO series Industry, the third and fourth series character Sir Henry Muck (played by Kit Harington) is portrayed as a member of the Bullingdon Club, and on occasional bouts of misbehavior, there are cries of "Buller Buller Buller!"; his character is shown to have strong connections through the club.

== Known members ==
Past members of the club include:

=== Royalty ===
- Frederick VII of Denmark (1808–1863)
- Edward VII of the United Kingdom of Great Britain and Ireland (1841–1910)
- Prince Leopold, Duke of Albany (1853–1884)
- Rama VI, King of Siam (1881–1925)
- Prince Paul of Yugoslavia (1893–1976)
- Edward VIII of Great Britain, Northern Ireland and the British Dominions Beyond the Seas (1894–1972)
- Frederik IX of Denmark (1899–1972)

=== Nobility ===
- Charles Douglas-Home, 12th Earl of Home (1834–1918), Lord Lieutenant of Lanarkshire (1890–1915) and Lord Lieutenant of Berwickshire (1879–1880)
- Henry Chaplin, 1st Viscount Chaplin (1840–1923)
- Archibald Primrose, 5th Earl of Rosebery (1847–1929), Prime Minister of the United Kingdom (1894–1895)
- Walter Long, 1st Viscount Long (1854–1924)
- William Grenfell, 1st Baron Desborough (1855–1945)
- George Curzon, 1st Marquess Curzon of Kedleston (1859–1925)
- George Gibbs, 1st Baron Wraxall (1873–1931)
- Prince Felix Yussupov (1887–1967)
- Prince Serge Obolensky (1890–1978)
- Walter Montagu Douglas Scott, 8th Duke of Buccleuch (1894–1973)
- Frank Pakenham, 7th Earl of Longford (1905–2001)
- Jacob Rothschild, 4th Baron Rothschild (1936–2024), British peer, investment banker and member of the Rothschild banking family
- Arthur Valerian Wellesley, 8th Duke of Wellington (1915–2014)
- John Scott, 9th Duke of Buccleuch (1923–2007)
- Lord Montagu of Beaulieu (1926–2015)
- Christopher James, 5th Baron Northbourne (1926–2019)
- Timothy Beaumont, Baron Beaumont of Whitley (1928–2008)
- Alexander Thynn, 7th Marquess of Bath (1932–2020)
- Peter Palumbo, Baron Palumbo (1935–)
- Michael Kerr, 13th Marquess of Lothian (1945–2024), Deputy Leader of the Conservative Party (2001–2005) and Chairman of the Conservative Party (1998–2001)
- Richard Scott, 10th Duke of Buccleuch (1954–)
- Count Gottfried von Bismarck (1962–2007)
- Shivraj Singh of Jodhpur (1975–)
- Arthur Wellesley, Earl of Mornington (1978–)
- Edward Windsor, Lord Downpatrick (1988–)

=== Politicians ===
- Thomas Assheton Smith the Younger (1776–1858), High Sheriff of Wiltshire (1838) and MP (1821–1831, 1832–1837)
- Sir Frederick Johnstone, 8th Baronet (1841–1913), MP (1874–1885)
- Lord Randolph Churchill (1849–1895), Chancellor of the Exchequer (1886), father of Sir Winston Churchill
- Cecil Rhodes (1853–1902), Prime Minister of the Cape Colony (1890–1896), endower of the Rhodes Scholarship
- Edward Grey, 1st Viscount Grey of Fallodon (1862–1933), Foreign Secretary (1905–1916)
- Ian Gilmour, Baron Gilmour of Craigmillar (1926–2007), MP (1962–1992), Secretary of State for Defence (1974), Lord Keeper of the Privy Seal (1979–1981), Member of the House of Lords (1992–2007)
- Thomas Agar-Robartes (1880–1915), MP (1906, 1908–1915)
- Edward Wood, 1st Earl of Halifax (1881–1959), Chancellor of the University of Oxford (1933–1959), Ambassador to the United States (1940–1946) Foreign Secretary (1938–1940), Leader of the House of Lords (1935–1938, 1940), Secretary of State for War (1935) and 20th Viceroy and Governor-General of India (1926–1931)
- Sir Philip Sassoon, 3rd Baronet (1888–1939), MP (1912–1939)
- Sir Hugh Munro-Lucas-Tooth, 1st Baronet (1903–1985), MP (1924–1929, 1945–1970)
- John Profumo, (1915–2006), Secretary of State for War (1960–1963)
- Alan Clark (1928–1999), Minister for Defence Procurement (1989–1992)
- Ewen Alexander Nicholas Fergusson (1962–), member of the Committee on Standards in Public Life
- Tim Rathbone (1933–2002), MP (1974–1997)
- David Faber (1961–), headmaster of Summer Fields School (2009–), MP (1992–2001) and grandson of Harold Macmillan
- Nick Hurd (1962–), government minister (2010–2019)
- Radosław Sikorski (1963–), Minister of Foreign Affairs of Poland (2007–2014, 2023–)
- Boris Johnson (1964–), Prime Minister of the United Kingdom (2019–2022), Foreign Secretary (2016–2018) and Mayor of London (2008–2016)
- David Cameron (1966–), Prime Minister of the United Kingdom (2010–2016)
- Jo Johnson (1971–), government minister (2015–2019) and Director of the Number 10 Policy Unit (2013–2015)
- George Osborne (1971–), First Secretary of State (2015–2016) and Chancellor of the Exchequer (2010–2016)

=== Business ===
- Rupert Soames (1959–), Winston Churchill's grandson and CEO of Serco
- Roddie Fleming (1953–), former chairman of Fleming Family & Partners, and nephew of James Bond creator Ian Fleming
- Darius Guppy (1964–), businessman
- George Farmer (1990–), former chairman of Turning Point UK and the former CEO of Parler. Son of Michael Farmer, Baron Farmer, and the husband of American political commentator Candace Owens
- Sebastian James (1966–), Former CEO of Dixons Carphone, current CEO of Boots UK
- Peter Holmes à Court (1968–), businessman
- Jason Gissing (1970–), co-founder of Ocado
- Nathaniel Rothschild (1971–), chairman of JNR Limited

=== Other ===
- Antony Acland (1930–2021), former British diplomat and Provost of Eton College
- David Bowes-Lyon (1902–1961), president of the Royal Horticultural Society, uncle of Elizabeth II
- Peter Fleming (1907–1971), writer and brother of Ian Fleming, creator of James Bond
- Sir Ludovic Kennedy (1919–2009), journalist
- David Dimbleby (1938–), journalist
- Sir Thomas Hughes-Hallett (1954–), barrister, investment banker, and philanthropy executive
- Sebastian Roberts (1954–2023), Senior Army Representative at the Royal College of Defence Studies
- Harry Mount (1971–), author and journalist who is editor of The Oldie magazine and a frequent contributor to the Daily Mail and The Daily Telegraph

== See also ==
- List of University of Oxford dining clubs
- Piers Gaveston Society
- Secret society
