= Michael Darrington =

British businessman (born 1942)

Sir Michael John Darrington (born 8 March 1942) is a British businessman. Educated at Lancing College in Sussex, Darrington later qualified as a chartered accountant and spent 17 years with United Biscuits from 1966 to 1983, latterly in general management. While there, in 1974, he enrolled in the Management Development program at Harvard Business School. He joined Greggs Bakery in 1983 and was appointed managing director in January 1984. Darrington was awarded a knighthood in the 2004 New Year Honours in recognition of his services to business and to the community in the North East. He married Paula Setterington in 1965, and has two daughters and a son. They currently reside in Northumberland.

Business positions
Preceded by Ian Gregg	Group Managing Director of Greggs; January 1984 - 2008	Succeeded by Ken McMeikan
