= Michael Nolan, Baron Nolan =

British Judge (1928–2007)

The Right Honourable The Lord Nolan PC DL
- Nolan in 1968 by Bassano Ltd

Lord of Appeal in Ordinary
- In office 1994–1998
- Appointed by: Elizabeth II

Member of the House of Lords
- Lord Temporal
- Lord of Appeal in Ordinary; 11 January 1994 – 22 January 2007

Personal details
- Born: Michael Patrick Nolan; 10 September 1928
- Died: 22 January 2007 (aged 78)
- Spouse: Margaret Noyes
- Children: 5
- Education: Wadham College, Oxford (MA)
- Occupation: Judge
- Profession: Barrister

Michael Patrick Nolan, Baron Nolan, PC, DL (10 September 1928 – 22 January 2007) was a judge in the United Kingdom, and from 1994 until 1997 was the first chairman of the Committee on Standards in Public Life. In the words of his obituary in The Guardian, "Lord Nolan .. made a profound mark on national life by substantially cleansing the Augean stable of corrupt politics as founding chairman of the Committee on Standards in Public Life."

== Early and private life ==
Nolan was the son of James Nolan, a solicitor, and his wife, Jane Nolan. His father's family had left County Kerry in the mid-19th century. Lord Nolan cited his parents as "the first and foremost influences on my life". The Nolan family lived in Bexhill-on-Sea. He, his elder brother, James "Jim" Nolan (died 2001) and his nephews, James, Rossa and Luke, all attended Ampleforth College.

After two years of national service in the Royal Artillery, from 1947 to 1949, he read law at Wadham College, Oxford, where he was awarded an honorary fellowship in 1992. His contemporaries at Oxford included Patrick Mayhew and Stephen Tumim, both of whom became close friends.

He married Margaret Noyes, whom he met at Oxford, in 1953; she was the younger daughter of the poet Alfred Noyes. They had one son and four daughters. They kept a second home on the Côte d'Azur.

== Legal career ==
Nolan was called to the bar at the Middle Temple in 1953, and specialised in tax law. He became a Queen's Counsel (QC) in 1968, and was called to the Bar in Northern Ireland in 1974, becoming a QC in Northern Ireland at the same time. He was a member of the Bar Council in 1973 to 1974, and a member of the Senate of the Inns of Court from 1974 to 1980. He became a bencher at Middle Temple in 1975. He was a member of the Sandilands Committee on Inflation Accounting from 1973 to 1975.

He was a Recorder in the Crown Court in Kent from 1975 to 1982, when he was appointed as a High Court judge and assigned to the Queen's Bench Division, receiving the customary knighthood. In 1984, during the miners' strike, he granted injunctions to the National Coal Board to prevent the National Union of Mineworkers using flying pickets. He was Presiding Judge of the Western Circuit from 1985 to 1988.

He was promoted to the Court of Appeal in 1991, joining the Privy Council. He heard appeals in many high-profile cases, including the case brought by relatives of the football spectators who died at Hillsborough in 1989, and in the case to review the decision not to bring prosecutions after the Marchioness disaster in 1989.

He sat with the Master of the Rolls, Lord Donaldson of Lymington, in M v Home Office, finding Home Secretary Kenneth Baker guilty of contempt of court after he refused to bring an asylum seeker back from Zaire, where he had been deported contrary to an earlier court order. He also sat in the constitution of the Court of Appeal which quashed the conviction of Judith Ward for involvement in the bombing of a coach on the M62 in 1974.

After just over two years in the Court of Appeal, he was promoted to the House of Lords in January 1994, becoming a Lord of Appeal in Ordinary and receiving a life peerage as a Law lord, taking the title Baron Nolan, of Brasted in the County of Kent.

He retired as a law lord in 1998.

== Committee on Standards in Public Life ==
Lord Nolan chaired the Committee on Standards in Public Life from 1994 to 1997. The committee was set up in late 1994 by John Major's government after the cash-for-questions affair, and has conducted numerous other inquiries. Its first report in 1995 created waves by recommending full disclosure of MPs' outside interests. He also produced a report in standards of conduct in local government in July 1997.

The principles embodied and articulated in the first report have since become embedded in public life in Britain, and are often referred to eponymously as the Nolan Principles.

== Later life ==
Nolan continued to serve in a public role in his retirement.

In 2000, at the request of Cardinal Cormac Murphy-O'Connor, he investigated the issue of paedophile priests in the Nolan Report.

Outside of the law, he was also Chancellor of the University of Essex from 1997 to 2002, a Deputy Lieutenant of Kent and a Knight of St Gregory.

In retirement, Lord Nolan suffered from an unspecified degenerative disease, dying in 2007 at age 78. He was survived by his wife, their son and four daughters, and twelve grandchildren.

== Honours ==
=== Commonwealth honours ===
Commonwealth honours

Country	Date	Appointment	Post-nominal letters
United Kingdom	1968 – 2007	Queen's Counsel	QC
United Kingdom	1982 – 2007	Knight Bachelor	Kt
United Kingdom	1991 – 2007	Member of Her Majesty's Most Honourable Privy Council	PC
United Kingdom		Deputy Lieutenant of the County of Kent	DL

=== Scholastic ===
Chancellor, visitor, governor, rector and fellowships

Location	Date	School	Position
England	1992 – 2007	Wadham College, Oxford	Honorary Fellowship
England	1997 – 2002	University of Essex	Chancellor

Honorary degrees

Location	Date	School	Degree	Gave Commencement Address
England	19 July 1996	University of Surrey	Doctor of the University (D.Univ)	Yes

== Arms ==
Coat of arms of Michael Nolan, Baron Nolan

Crest
A lamb statant guardant Argent nimbed and unguled Or supporting with the sinister forefoot over the shoulder a celtic long cross Gules.
Escutcheon
Gules between six Ermine spots Or two bars wavy couped composed of two troughs and a wave invected of one point on the upper edge and engrailed of one point on the lower edge Argent in chief a like bar also Argent.
Supporters
On either side a llama Argent charged with a fess Gules.

== Notes ==
Government offices
New office	Chairman of the Committee on Standards in Public Life; 1994–1997	Succeeded by The Lord Neill of Bladen
Academic offices
Preceded by Sir Patrick Nairne	Chancellor of the University of Essex; 1997–2002	Succeeded by The Lord Phillips of Sudbury
