= Tim Steiner (businessman) =

British businessman (born 1969)

- Born: Timothy Steiner; 9 November 1969 (age 56)
- Education: Haberdashers' Boys' School
- Alma mater: University of Manchester
- Occupation: Businessman
- Known for: co-founder and CEO, Ocado
- Term: 2000–present
- Spouse: Belinda Steiner (m. 1989; div. 2018)
- Children: 4

Tim Steiner OBE (born 9 December 1969) is a British businessman who is the co-founder and chief executive (CEO) of Ocado, the FTSE 100 online grocery and technology business. As of May 2023, Ocado had a market capitalisation of nearly £3 billion. The 2020 Sunday Times Rich List estimates that Steiner is worth £403 million.

== Early life ==
Tim Steiner was born on 9 December 1969. He was educated at Haberdashers' Boys’ School in Elstree, Hertfordshire. He read Economics at the University of Manchester.

== Career ==
In 1992, Steiner joined Goldman Sachs as a bond trader. He worked for them for eight years in London, New York and Hong Kong before leaving to co-found Ocado in 2000 with Jonathan Faiman and Jason Gissing. Faiman left the business before it floated on the London Stock Exchange in 2010 and Gissing left in 2014. Steiner remains Ocado's chief executive.

In February 2020, it was announced that Steiner received a pay package of £58.7 million for the year to 1 December 2019.

Following the lock down due to the outbreak of COVID-19 in the UK in March 2020, Ocado recorded 40 percent revenue growth in April and May compared to the same period last year.

Steiner donated £50,000 to the Conservative Party during the 2019 United Kingdom general election.

== Personal life ==
Steiner was brought up in North London. He has four children with ex-wife Belinda. The couple were divorced in 2016.
