= Jonathan Faiman =

American businessman

Jonathan Faiman (born 1969) was one of the three founders of online grocery and technology business Ocado in 2000. He left the business in 2008, before the company floated on the London Stock Exchange. Faiman sold most of his shares in Ocado in 2010 at the time of its IPO for a reported value of £7 million. If owned in May 2020, the shares would have been worth over £500 million.

More recently, in 2018, he founded Today Development Partners, also known as TDP and T0DAY (spelled with a zero), also an online grocery business that was established to rival his former business Ocado. This business has been the subject of controversy and litigation. In July 2019, Faiman was sued by Ocado over allegations that Faiman had colluded with Jon Hilary, then a senior Ocado employee, to steal confidential information from Ocado in order to launch T0DAY. In June 2021, the case was settled following an admission of wrongdoing by the pair and Faiman making a "significant payment" to Ocado. Ocado said it had recovered the confidential information and the High Court has made a permanent injunction, backed by a penal notice, preventing Faiman from using the confidential information in the future. The future of TDP is unclear.

== Career ==
Faiman worked at Goldman Sachs as a bond trader before becoming one of the three founders of Ocado in 2000. The other founders are Jason Gissing and Tim Steiner, both of whom were also Goldman Sachs employees. Faiman left Ocado in 2008 and stepped down from the board in 2010. Ocado is now a FTSE 100 online grocery and technology company with a market capitalisation of nearly £15 billion.

Having left Ocado, Faiman started a wheat farming business in Ukraine. In 2015, Faiman moved to run Neos Geosolutions, a company that aimed to collect and analyse geological data to find new oil and gas reserves onshore. Despite being backed financially by Bill Gates, Goldman Sachs and Kleiner Perkins, the business failed in 2018 and was being sued by investors until Faiman settled the case out of court.

In 2018, Faiman founded T0DAY and, in May 2019, it was announced that Waitrose was in discussions with T0DAY for it to become its online retail partner after Ocado had terminated their 20-year relationship in favour of a partnership with Marks and Spencer. However, Waitrose terminated these negotiations in July 2019 after a court search found hundreds of confidential Ocado documents in Faiman's possession, which led to Ocado suing Faiman, TDP and Jon Hillary for intellectual property theft.

In March 2022, TDP entered administration, with Ocado acquiring some of the company's assets.

== Litigation ==
In June 2019, Ocado obtained a court order for searches to be carried out the offices of T0DAY and the residences of Faiman and Jon Hilary (then a senior Ocado employee), concerned they had stolen information from Ocado. The searches found hundreds of documents including Ocado contracts, pitch documents and blueprints for an automated warehouse. Following the search, Faiman and Hillary admitted to working together and using information about Ocado's business to pitch T0DAY’s services while Hillary was still working at Ocado. Hillary has admitted breaching his contract but Faiman denies that the stolen information was valuable to them.

The case attracted substantial media coverage in 2019, 2020 and 2021. The case was settled in June 2021 following an admission of wrongdoing in an agreed statement of facts in which the defendants acknowledge that Hillary, while still employed by Ocado and at Faiman’s request, provided Faiman with a “significant number” of confidential documents belonging to Ocado. It was reported that Faiman made a "significant payment" to Ocado and covered their legal fees reported to be £1.75 million.

In June 2020, it was reported that Faiman is being sued by Russian industrialist and billionaire Andrey Melnichenko for unpaid debts amounting to £57 million. In the High Court hearing, Faiman said that his supermarket tech business T0DAY was at risk of collapse because he could not pay the debt.

In September 2020, it was reported that Faiman had had his assets frozen as a result of the dispute with Melnichenko. Melnichenko's US lawyers requested access to Faiman's bank records saying, "evidence is needed to trace the funds wrongly diverted by Mr Faiman and seek to freeze those funds before they disappear".
