= Nolan Report (Catholic Church) =

2001 report on clerical child abuse

The Nolan Report is a report published in 2001 by Michael Nolan on the problem of clerical child abuse.

In 2000, at the request of Cardinal Cormac Murphy-O'Connor, he investigated the issue of paedophile priests and child protection in the Catholic Church in England and Wales.

As a result of this report, the Catholic Church in England and Wales formed an agency called COPCA (Catholic Office for the Protection of Children and Vulnerable Adults) to centrally manage CRB (Criminal Records Bureau) applications.

His Vice-chairman on the committee was a fellow Old Amplefordian, Sir Swinton Thomas.
