= Ewen Alexander Nicholas Fergusson =

British businessman (born 1965)

Ewen Fergusson
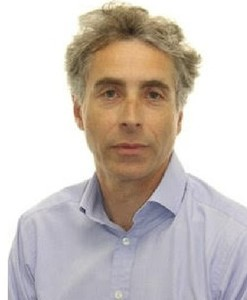
- Born: Ewen Alexander Nicholas Fergusson; 30 November 1965 (age 60); Wimbledon, London
- Occupations: Business advisor; Public servant; Film production
- Known for: Bullingdon Club; Law and global finance; Committee for Standards in Public Life

Ewen Alexander Nicholas Fergusson (born 30 November 1965) is a British former lawyer who was appointed to serve on the Committee on Standards in Public Life (CSPL) from August 2021, an appointment which has led to accusations of cronyism by the opposition British Labour Party.

== Life ==
Fergusson is the son of diplomat Sir Ewen Fergusson and Sara Carolyn Montgomery Cuninghame (née Gordon Lennox). Fergusson followed his father's educational path via Rugby School and Oriel College, Oxford, where he read history.

At Oriel, Fergusson joined the Bullingdon Club, an exclusive dining society with an apparent objective to cause mayhem and damage while under the influence of alcohol. Fergusson's group of 1987 included two members who were to become British prime ministers, David Cameron and Boris Johnson. The group were noted for throwing a plant pot through a restaurant window with six of the group of ten being apprehended by police. There have been allegations, that Fergusson, noted as being the "quiet one" of the group was the one who threw the plant pot, though there is uncertainty. (Note: Adams for The Independent is careful to point out there are discrepancies in people's recollection of the "plant pot" incident, and the truth may be different)

Fergusson qualified as a lawyer, and joined the international law firm Herbert Smith Freehills (HSF) in 2000 and served as a partner in the finance division. In 2020 he was to lose in an election contest with fellow partner Malcolm Hitching for the position of HSF's global banking practice. He left HSF in 2018 to become a self-employed business advisor. As of July 2021 Fergusson was noted as a non-magistrate member of the Lord Chancellor's advisory committee for South East England, as well as having roles as co-producer in a number of film projects.

It was announced in July 2021 Fergusson was to have a five-year appointment to the CSPL starting in August. Due to Fergusson's previous associations with prime minister Boris Johnson, the British Labour Party opposition accused the incumbent Conservative Party of cronyism, a claim rejected by the British government who stated the appointment was the result of "fair and open competition." On 23 July 2021 CSPL chairperson Johnathan Evans took the unusual step of writing to Michael Gove about concerns "Members of the Committee have, however, expressed concerns about our lack of visible diversity now as a group." with Fergusson and Gillian Peele replacing earlier incumbents, the letter not being made public until later in August. (Note: The Evans letter on lack of diversity was written on 23 July 2021 after the CSPL meeting of 15 July 2021.) As an introduction to his first CSPL committee meeting on 16 September 2021 Fergusson acknowledged there had been some publicity about his appointment and that he "wished to correct some of the (published) facts: he had not been asked by anyone to apply for the role; and had last seen the Prime Minister at an external event in 2008."
