= Jason Gissing =

British businessman

- Born: 1970 (age 55–56)
- Education: Oundle School; Worcester College, Oxford University
- Known for: Ocado

Jason Gissing (born 1970) is a British businessman who is a co-founder of Ocado.

== Early life ==
Gissing was born in the UK to a Japanese mother and English father and was educated at Oundle School in Northamptonshire and Worcester College, Oxford University. Whilst at Oxford University, Gissing was a member of the Bullingdon Club, an exclusive and controversial drinking society.

== Career ==
After graduating from university, Gissing worked as a bond trader at Goldman Sachs. In January 2000, he started Ocado with two former colleagues from Goldman Sachs, Tim Steiner and Jonathan Faiman. He became chief financial officer of the company. The company moved from a start-up to a household name during his 15 years there.

In January 2014, Gissing announced that he would retire in May. On his departure, Ocado had sales of £1 billion and had made its first ever profit. In May 2018, Ocado joined the FTSE 100 valued at almost £6 billion. At the time it was the most valuable technology business in the U.K.

== Personal life ==
Gissing is married to former downhill skier Katinka, daughter of Arne Næss Jr. who led the first ever successful Norwegian ascent of Everest with Sir Chris Bonington and was most famous for being the husband of Diana Ross for 15 years. Gissing and his wife have four children.
