= HM Prison Bullingdon =

Prison in Oxfordshire, England

Coordinates: 51.8489°N 1.0936°W

His Majesty's Prison and Young Offenders Institute Bullingdon
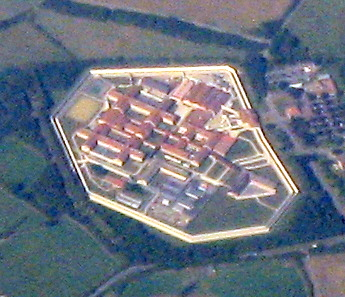
- Interactive map of His Majesty's Prison and Young Offenders Institute Bullingdon
- Location: Arncott, Oxfordshire
- Status: Full Operational Capacity
- Security class: Category B
- Capacity: HMP & YOI Local and Resettlement
- Population: Certified - 869 Maximum Capacity - 1,114 (April 2018)
- Opened: 1992
- Managed by: HM Prison and Probation Service Ministry of Justice (United Kingdom)
- Governor: Amanda Thomson
- Website: Bullingdon at justice.gov.uk

HM Prison and Young Offenders Institute Bullingdon is a prison in Oxfordshire, England. It is a public sector prison operated by HM Prison and Probation Service (an executive agency of the Ministry of Justice).

Located near MoD Bicester, it is a local and resettlement prison accepting Security Category B male prisoners. (New admissions from courts are generally sent to 'local' prisons and are considered as a Category B prisoner until their initial security assessment.) Prisoners must be over the age of 18 (as a Young Offender (YO)). As YO prisoners are not subject to the same 4 level security category, they are either considered 'YOI Closed' or 'YOI Open' - depending on whether they are suitable for transfer to open conditions.

The prison generally only holds prisoners on short sentences (under 12 months) and those on remand. With the additional resettlement function, prisoners in the local area of the prison should be transferred for their 12-week pre-release period.

HMP & YOI Bullingdon also has a dedicated 'Vulnerable Prisoners' unit which holds several hundred sex offenders who are at Bullingdon in order to complete a Sex Offender Treatment Programme (SOTP).

== History ==
Opened in 1994, Bullingdon was constructed on obsolete Ministry of Defence site - MoD Bicester. The prison opened with 4 residential units, named after villages in the local area.

- A - Wing (Arncott Unit)
- B - Wing (Blackthorn Unit)
- C - Wing (Charndon Unit)
- D - Wing (Dorton Unit)

Each of the 4 wings were created virtually identical, with only different coloured doors to be able to identify the unit.

As the prison population continued to grow the prison constructed 2 new units

- E - Wing (Edgcott Unit) - used to house sex offender prisoners only.
- F - Wing (Finmere Unit) - Induction / First Night Centre

Since the prison opened back in 1994 it has been the subject of scandal and failing HMIP reports. The most notable is in January 2003 when Deputy Governor Terence McLaren was suspended after he had been arrested on suspicion of child pornography offences. In 2006, Governor Phil Taylor banned officers from displaying the Flag of England as he feared it may upset foreign prisoners. HM Inspectorate of Prisons has published several reports criticising overcrowding, safety issues, gang violence, drugs and other issues.

On 17 March 2019 David Gray, 54, was found dead in his healthcare unit cell as a result of suicide.

== Notable inmates ==
- Munir Hussain, a businessman who participated with others in severely beating a home invader was held for a month in Bullingdon.
- Rolf Harris, entertainer and TV personality, found guilty in July 2014 of twelve sex crimes against minors, was imprisoned in Bullingdon instead of HM Prison Wandsworth.
