= Committee on Standards in Public Life =

UK ethical standards advisory body

The Committee on Standards in Public Life (CSPL) is an advisory non-departmental public body of the United Kingdom Government, established by John Major in 1994 to advise the Prime Minister on ethical standards of public life. It promotes a code of conduct called the Seven Principles of Public Life, also known as the Nolan principles after the first chairman of the committee, Lord Nolan.

== Function ==
The Committee on Standards in Public Life is an independent advisory non-departmental public body, with a secretariat and budget provided by the Cabinet Office. The committee advises and makes recommendations to the prime minister on ethical standards in public life. It can conduct inquiries and collect evidence to assess institutions, policies and practices.

It is formally responsible for:

- advising the Prime Minister on ethical issues relating to standards in public life
- conducting broad inquiries into standards of conduct
- making recommendations as to changes in present arrangements
- promoting the Seven Principles of Public Life.

The Committee does not investigate individual allegations of misconduct.

== Seven Principles of Public Life ==
The committee promotes a code of conduct for those in public life called the Seven Principles of Public Life or the Nolan Principles:

- Selflessness – Holders of public office should act solely in terms of the public interest.
- Integrity – Holders of public office must avoid placing themselves under any obligation to people or organisations that might try inappropriately to influence them in their work. They should not act or take decisions to gain financial or other material benefits for themselves, their family, or their friends. They must declare and resolve any interests and relationships.
- Objectivity – Holders of public office must act and take decisions impartially, fairly and on merit, using the best evidence and without discrimination or bias.
- Accountability – Holders of public office are accountable to the public for their decisions and actions and must submit themselves to the scrutiny necessary to ensure this.
- Openness – Holders of public office should act and take decisions in an open and transparent manner. Information should not be withheld from the public unless there are clear and lawful reasons for so doing.
- Honesty – Holders of public office should be truthful
- Leadership – Holders of public office should exhibit these principles in their own behaviour and treat others with respect. They should actively promote and robustly support the principles and challenge poor behaviour wherever it occurs.

These Seven Principles apply to anyone who works as a public office holder, including:

- Those elected or appointed to public office, nationally or locally,
- Those appointed to work in the civil service, local government, the police, courts and probation services, non-departmental public bodies, and in the health, education, social and care services, and
- Those in the private sector delivering public services.

== Influence ==
The Seven Principles of Public Life have proved influential and are enshrined in codes of conduct across the UK public sector, from schools and government departments to hospitals. They are incorporated into a variety of government-related codes including the Ministerial Code, the Civil Service Code, the Civil Service Management Code, and the House of Lords Code of Conduct. Many local authorities, charities and educational and healthcare bodies adhere to the principles, including – to cite just a few examples – Oxfordshire County Council, the University of Exeter, the University of Nottingham, the NHS Board, the National Trust, and the Good Governance Institute. The principles have also been important in informing ethics debates internationally.

== Members ==
The Committee consists of a chair, four independent members and three political members, being four men and four women. The chair and independent members are appointed by the Prime Minister for a single five-year term, following an open competition regulated by the Office of the Commissioner for Public Appointments (OCPA). The political members, nominated by the Conservative, Labour and Scottish National (until December 2022, the Liberal Democrat) political parties, are appointed for three years with the possibility of reappointment.

Position	Current holder	Appointed	Term
Chair	Lt Gen Douglas Chalmers	1 January 2024	5 years
Member	Margaret Beckett, Baroness Beckett (Labour Party)	1 November 2010 (last reappointed 1 November 2022)	3 years
Member	Ian Blackford (Scottish National Party)	26 June 2023	3 years
Member	Professor Gillian Peele (Independent member)	1 August 2021	5 years
Member	Ewen Fergusson (Independent member)	1 August 2021	5 years
Member	Mary Arden, Lady Arden of Heswall (Independent member)	13 February 2023	5 years
Member	John Henderson (Independent member)	26 February 2024	5 years
Member	Ruth Dombey (Independent member)	15 November 2024	3 years
Member	Michael Tomlinson (Conservative Party)	5 January 2026	3 years

== History ==
The Committee was initially established in October 1994 by the Prime Minister, John Major, in response to concerns that the conduct of some politicians was unethical – for example, during the cash-for-questions affair.

=== 1994 terms of reference ===
The Committee's original terms of reference were "To examine current concerns about standards of conduct of all holders of public office, including arrangements relating to financial and commercial activities, and make recommendations as to any changes in present arrangements which might be required to ensure the highest standards of propriety in public life".

=== First report, 1995 ===
The Committee's first report in 1995 established an initial version of The Seven Principles of Public Life, also known as the Nolan Principles after the committee's first chairman. The principles were Selflessness, Integrity, Objectivity, Accountability, Openness, Honesty and Leadership.

=== 1997 change of remit – funding of political parties ===
As Tony Blair had announced in 1996, referring back to the Neil Hamilton and Cash-for-questions affair, the committee's terms of reference were extended in November 1997. The committee's new remit included "To review issues in relation to the funding of political parties, and to make recommendations as to any changes in present arrangements."

=== 2013 change of remit – devolved assemblies ===
In February 2013, the committee's terms of reference were amended to specify that "...in future the Committee should not inquire into matters relating to the devolved legislatures and governments except with the agreement of those bodies". In June of that year the committee was included on a list of 200 organisations that the UK government claimed may need to be replicated in the event of Scottish Independence.

=== 2013 change of remit – non-elected and non-appointed officials ===
The Committee's remit was also expanded in February 2013 to cover standards of conduct of all holders of public office, not solely those appointed or elected to public office, including all those involved in the delivery of public services. It was later clarified that the committee "can examine issues relating to the ethical standards of the delivery of public services by private and voluntary sector organisations, paid for by public funds, even where those delivering the services have not been appointed or elected to public office."

=== 2021 review ===
In September 2020, the committee commenced a detailed review into processes in Westminster. In its interim and final reports of July and November 2021, it noted that transparency relating to lobbying was "poor", and it recommended tightening up the rules governing the conduct of ministers and senior civil servants. A survey conducted by the committee found that the COVID-19 pandemic had exposed poor behaviour by politicians, including breaches of lockdown rules and the awarding of public procurement contracts to ministers' friends. Survey participants were said to be "visibly angry as they recounted the strict pandemic rules they had to follow, which they believed were disregarded by various politicians who subsequently faced few or no consequences." The committee's final report found the effectiveness of ethics regulators in Whitehall had "not kept pace with wider changes" and that there was a "particular need for reform in central government". Lord Evans called for more power to be given to the independent adviser on ministerial standards, and for these stronger rules to be written into law.

=== 2021 concerns about appointments to the committee ===
In 2021, the committee's only non-white member Monisha Shah came to the end of her five-year appointment to the committee, and on 1 August new members Ewen Fergusson and Gillian Peele were appointed. The committee's chair, Lord Evans, wrote to the Cabinet Office minister reporting concerns about the committee's "lack of visible diversity now as a group" and said that the watchdog "needs to be representative of the people we serve." The appointment of Ewen Fergusson was criticised by the Labour Party as "cronyism", as he had been a member of the Bullingdon Club at Oxford at the same time as Boris Johnson. Former committee chair Sir Alistair Graham attacked the appointment as a "pathetic" attempt to recruit an old friend of the Prime Minister to an independent committee.

== List of past committee chairs ==
- Michael Nolan, Baron Nolan 28 October 1994 – 7 November 1997
- Patrick Neill, Baron Neill of Bladen 7 November 1997 – 1 March 2001
- Sir Nigel Wicks 1 March 2001 – 26 April 2004
- Sir Alistair Graham 26 April 2004 – 24 April 2007
- Rita Donaghy, Baroness Donaghy 25 April 2007 –
- Sir Christopher Kelly 1 January 2008 – 1 April 2013
- Paul Bew, Baron Bew 1 September 2013 – 25 October 2018
- Jonathan Evans, Baron Evans of Weardale 25 October 2018 – 31 October 2023

== Bibliography ==
- Leopold, Patricia (2004). "Standards of Conduct in Public Life". In Jowell, Jeffrey; Oliver, Dawn (eds.). The Changing Constitution (5 ed.). Oxford University Press. ISBN 0-19-926439-2.
- "Committee on Standards in Public Life: Annual Report 2017-18" (PDF). Committee on Standards in Public Life. 2018.
- "First Report of the Committee on Standards in Public Life" (PDF). Committee on Standards in Public Life. 1995. Archived from the original (PDF) on 5 December 2013.
- "Annual Report 2010–11" (PDF). Committee on Standards in Public Life. September 2011. Archived from the original (PDF) on 23 January 2013.
