= Ocado =

British online supermarket

Ocado Group plc
- Formerly: Ocado Group Limited (2009–2010)
- Type: Public
- Traded as: LSE: OCDO
- Industry: Internet retail
- Founded: April 2000; 26 years ago
- Founder: Jonathan Faiman; Jason Gissing; Tim Steiner
- Headquarters: Hatfield, Hertfordshire, England, UK
- Area served: United Kingdom
- Key people: Richard Haythornthwaite (Chairman); Tim Steiner (CEO)
- Services: Groceries; Consumer goods
- Revenue: ▲£1,361.5 million (2025)
- Operating income: ▲£(241.4) million (2025)
- Net income: ▲£395.2 million (2025)
- Website: ocadogroup.com

Ocado Group plc (/ɒˈkɑːdoʊ/ ok-AH-doh) is a British business based in Hatfield, England, which licenses grocery technology. It also owns a 50% share in the UK grocery retail business Ocado Retail Ltd (the other 50% is owned by UK retailer Marks & Spencer). The company is listed on the London Stock Exchange and is a constituent of the FTSE 250 Index.

== History ==
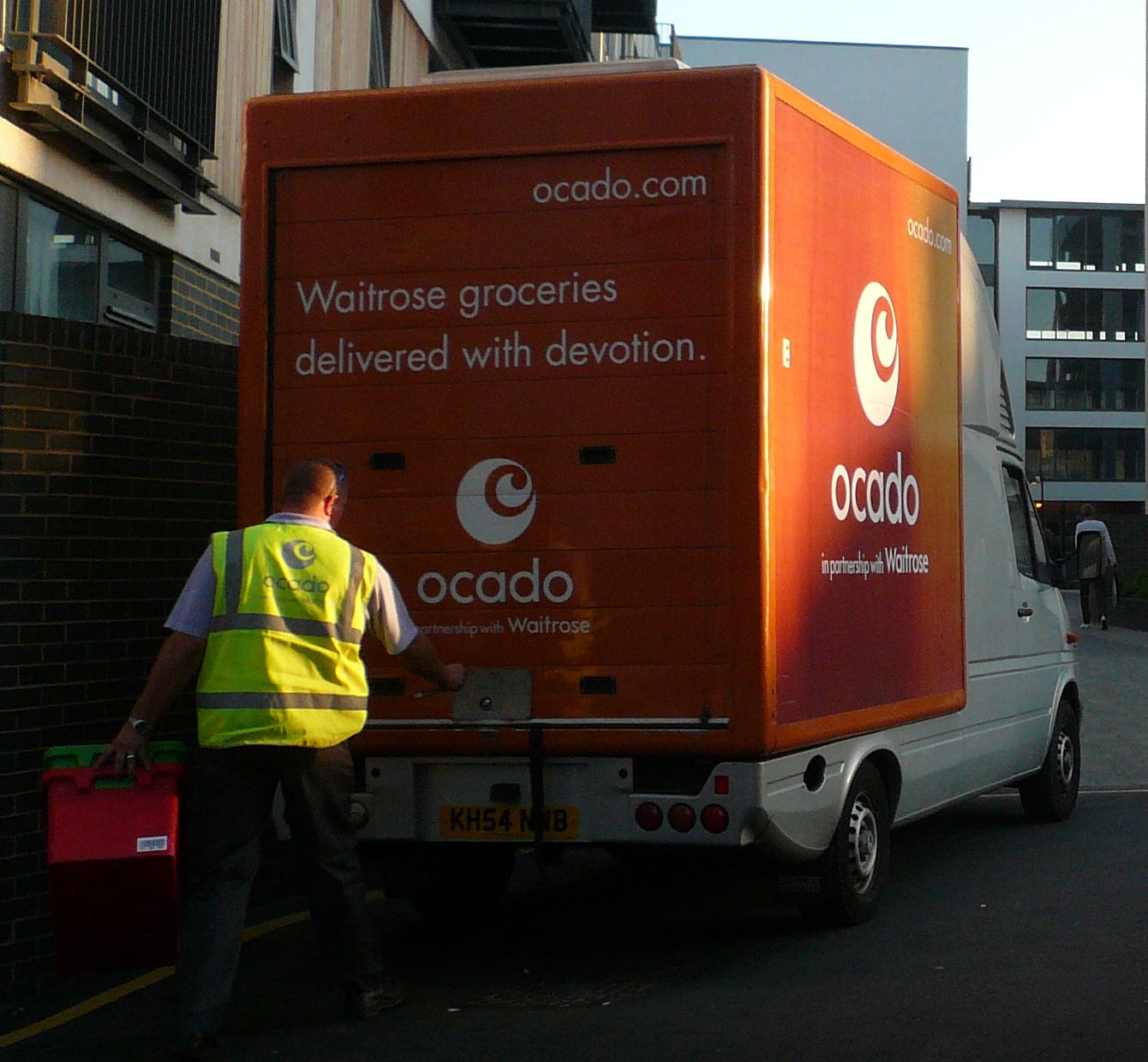
An Ocado delivery in progress

Ocado was established by Jonathan Faiman, Jason Gissing and Tim Steiner, former merchant bankers with Goldman Sachs, as L. M. Solutions, in January 2000. Ocado started trading as a business in partnership with Waitrose, part of the John Lewis Partnership, in January 2002.

In September 2006, Michael Grade became non-executive chairman of Ocado. In November 2008, the John Lewis Partnership transferred its shareholding of 29% into its staff pension fund. In May 2010 the John Lewis Partnership entered into a 10-year branding and supply agreement with Ocado. In February 2011, the John Lewis pension fund sold off its entire Ocado shareholding.

On 13 July 2009, Ocado released its first app for the iPhone. The app, called 'Ocado on the Go', allows users to do their grocery shopping without the need for a PC. On 19 April 2010, the company extended the app to Android devices.

In July 2010, Ocado undertook a stock market Initial public offering.

In January 2014, Ocado started providing website, warehousing and delivery services for one of their main grocery rivals, Morrisons supermarkets, allowing them to operate online using Ocado's network of depots to deliver Morrisons groceries to online customers.

On 14 June 2014, the company changed its name from L. M. Solutions to Ocado Retail.

In 2015, Ocado launched the Ocado Smart Platform, its proprietary end-to-end solution for operating retail businesses online. The company went on to sell the use of this software platform to the French Casino Group in November 2017, to the Canadian supermarket chain Sobeys in January 2018, to the US retail company Kroger in May 2018, and to the Australian retail business Coles Group in May 2020.

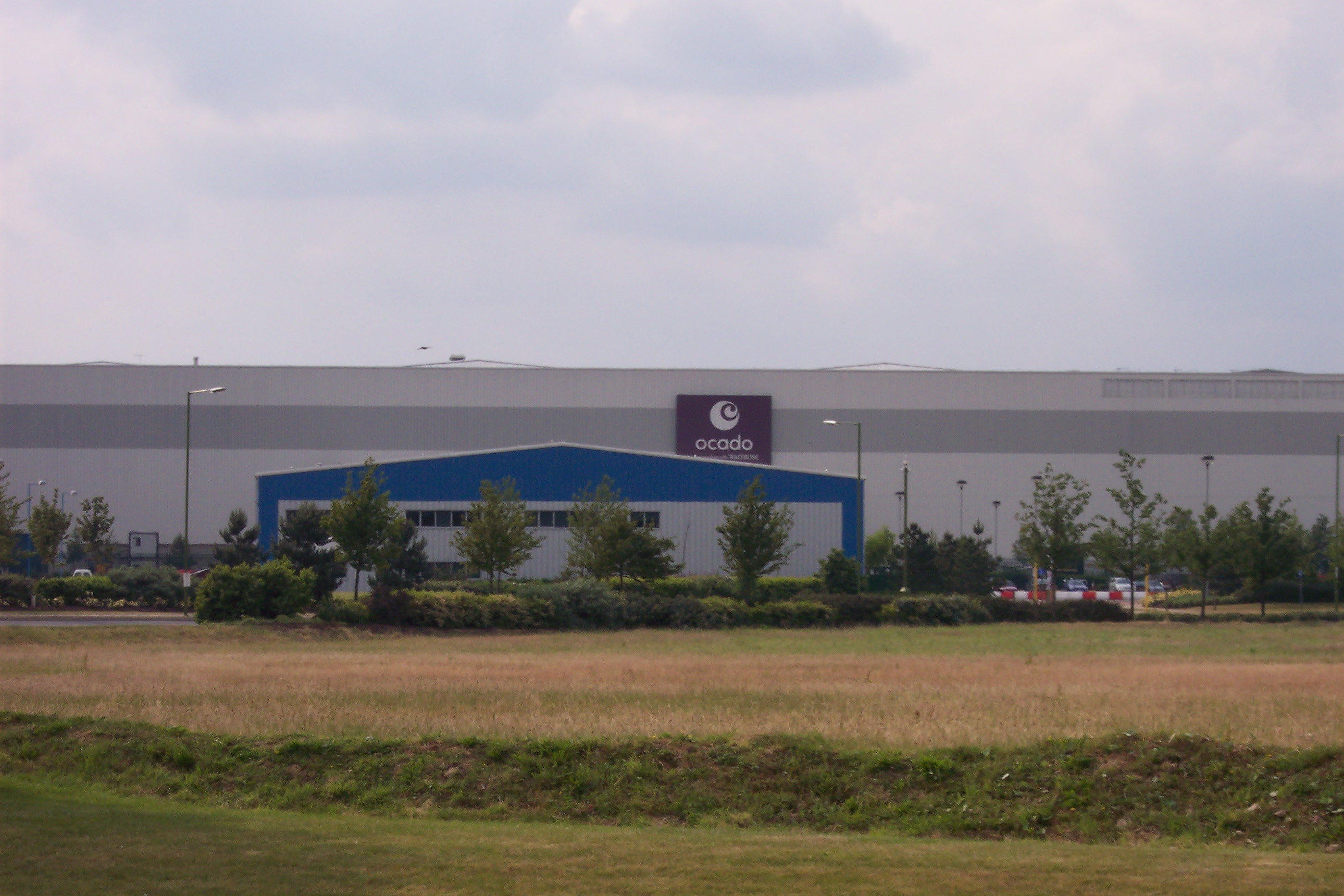
Ocado's warehouse in Hatfield

In the early morning of 5 February 2019, Ocado's customer fulfilment centre (CFC) in Andover, Hampshire, which handles 10 per cent of its fulfilments, caught fire. The fire continued to burn the following day, engaging more than 25 fire engines and 300 firefighters from multiple fire services, as far as Kent. The fire burned for more than 3 days, with the roof collapsing in the process. The cause was a fault in a battery charging unit, exacerbated by worker responses. The rebuilt warehouse was operational by August 2021.

On 27 February 2019, Ocado and Marks & Spencer announced a joint venture, whereby Marks & Spencer agreed to pay £750M for a 50% share in Ocado's UK retail business, Ocado.com. Part of the amount to be paid by M&S depended on the performance of the joint venture in the years up to and including 2023. As of 2026, payments are disputed, with M&S arguing that contingent performance targets were not met.

Ocado ceased selling own brand groceries from the Waitrose supermarket chain in September 2020.

In June 2026, The Times reported that shares in the company were selling below its initial flotation price, and that given the lack of profitability, disputes and potential losses of current partners, some shareholders are pushing for the replacement of Steiner, the current CEO.

In July 2026, Ocado agreed to build a large automated customer fulfilment centre for an unnamed European national retailer. The facility was scheduled to begin operating during Ocado's 2028 financial year and was expected to open at slightly more than half of its design capacity.

== Activities ==
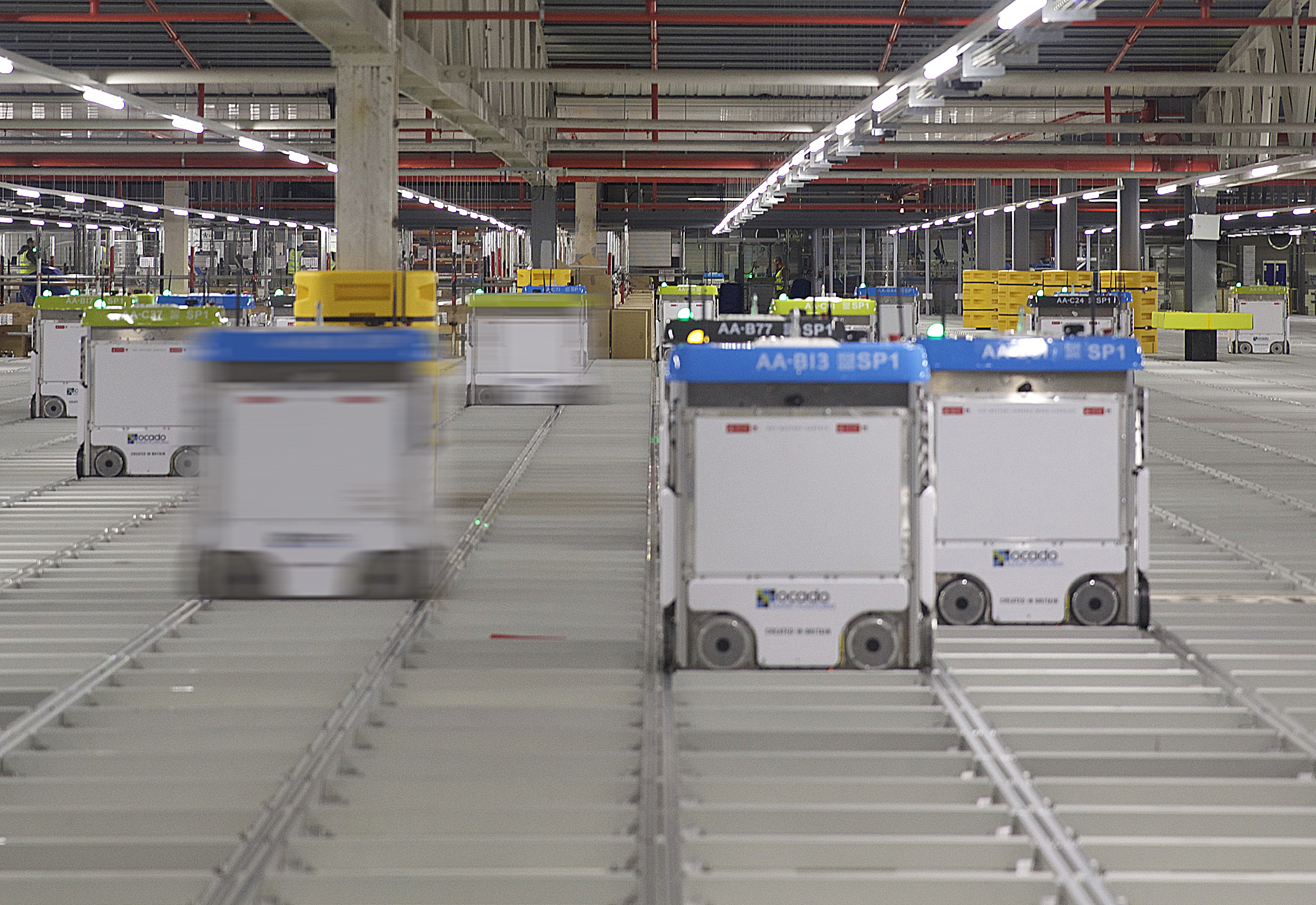
Bots inside an Ocado warehouse

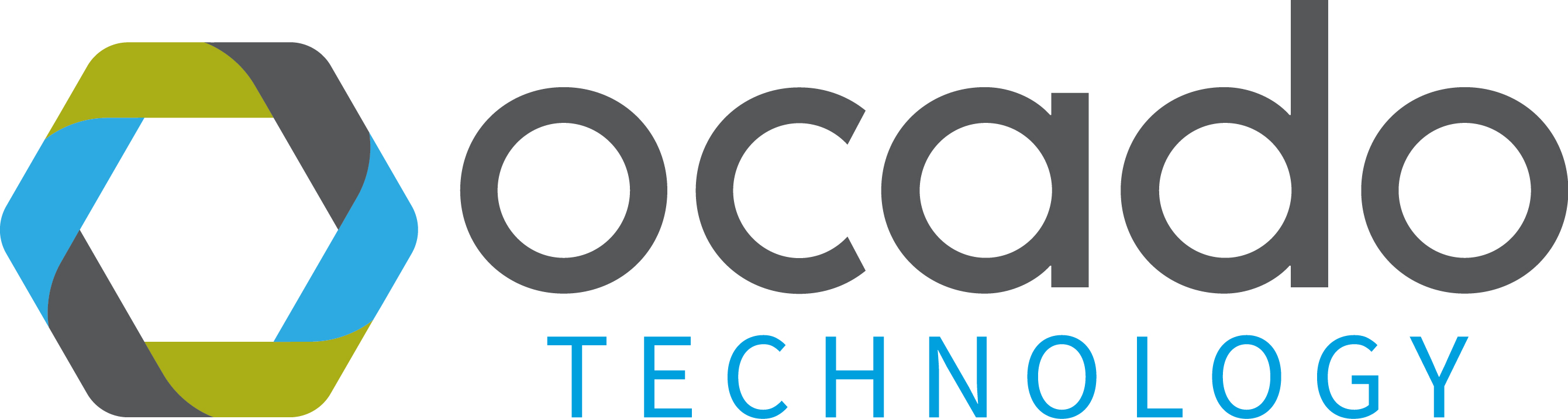
Ocado Technology logo

The company licenses Ocado Smart Platform, a proprietary solution for operating retail businesses online. It also owns a 50% share in the UK retail business, Ocado.com (the other 50% is owned by UK retailer Marks & Spencer). In 2023, the retail business accounted for around 90% of group revenue.

Since 2014, Ocado has supported Code For Life, a not-for-profit organisation which helps children learn computer programming.

== Animal welfare ==
Ocado, along with Waitrose and other supermarkets, has phased out the practice of shrimps eyestalk ablation within its supply chain.

== Name ==
Jez Frampton, CEO of Interbrand and non-executive director of Ocado, claims the name "Ocado" is "a made-up word, intended to evoke fresh fruit". Neil Taylor, an Interbrand consultant, stated that the name was derived from avocado.
