= Zayeltsovsky District, Novosibirsk =

Zayeltsovsky District
- District
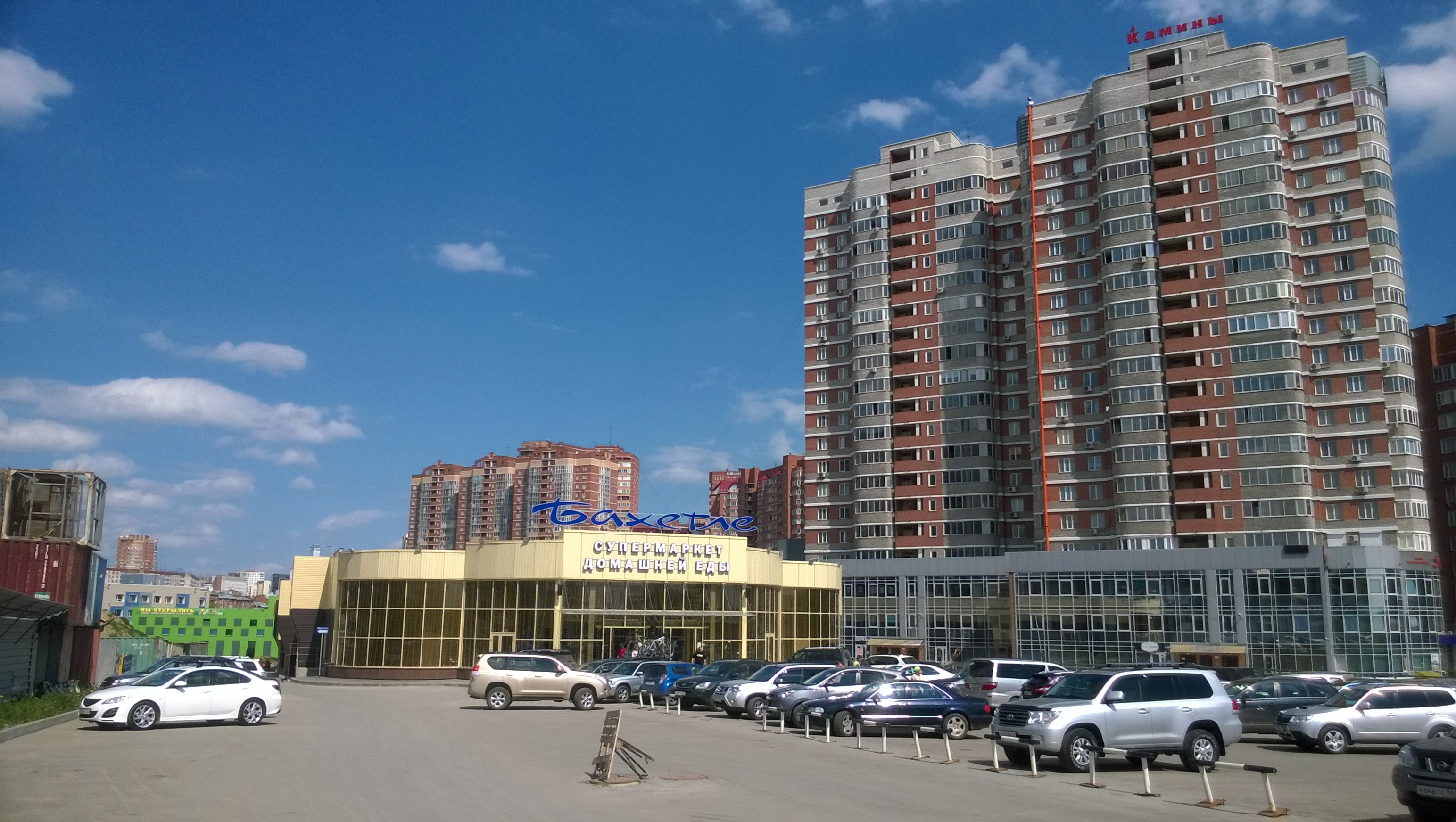

- Coat of arms
- Location of Zayeltsovsky City District
- Coordinates: 55°2′30″N 82°55′0″E
- Country: Russia
- Federal subject: Novosibirsk
- Established: 25 March 1940

Area
  - Total: 83 km^{2} (32 sq mi)

Zayeltsovsky District (Russian: Заельцовский район) is an administrative district (raion) of Central Okrug, one of the 10 raions of Novosibirsk, Russia. The area of the district is 83 km^{2} (32 sq mi). Population: 149, 100 (2017).

== History ==
Zayeltsovsky City District was established March 25, 1940.

== Streets ==
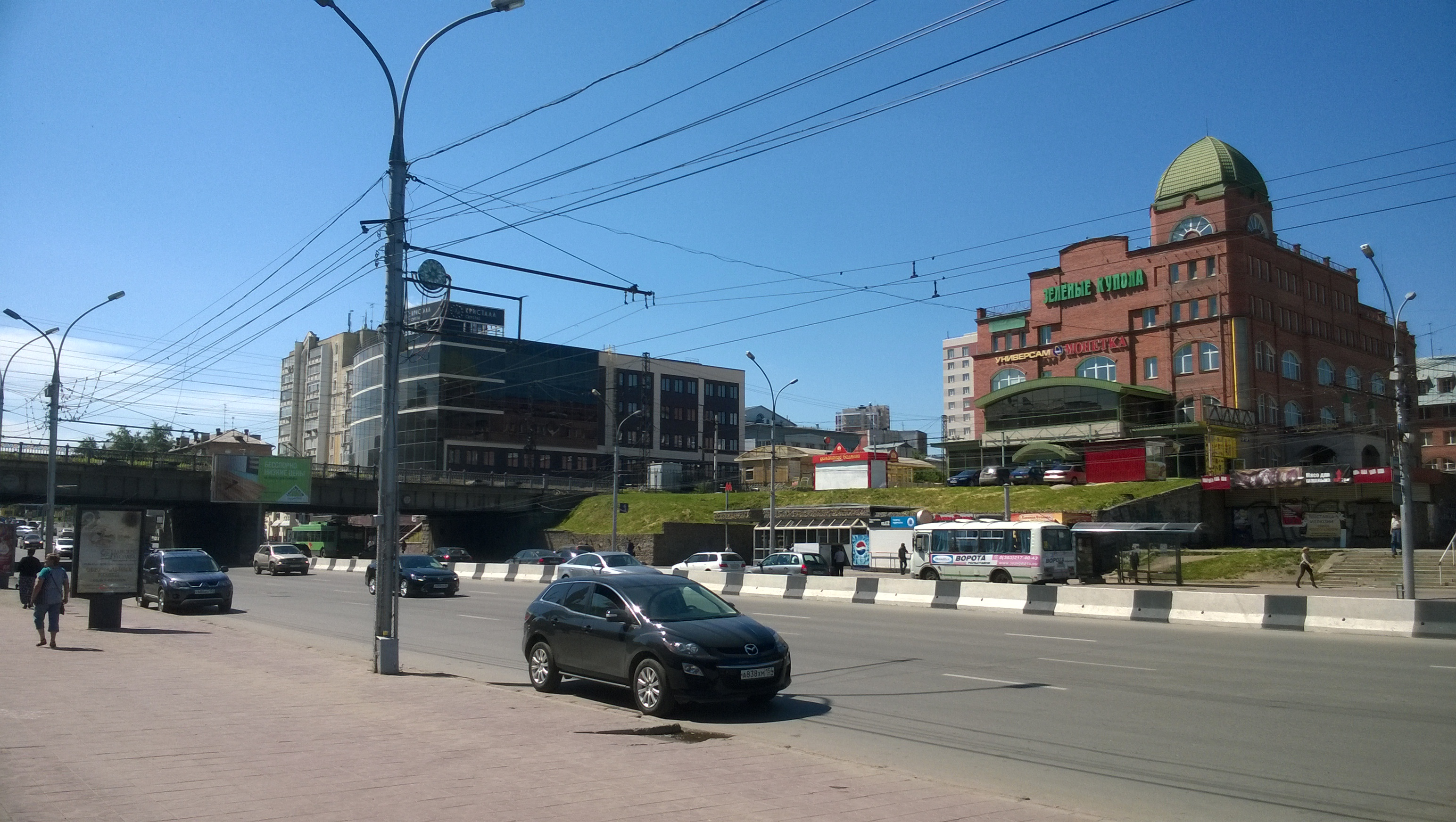
Krasny Avenue

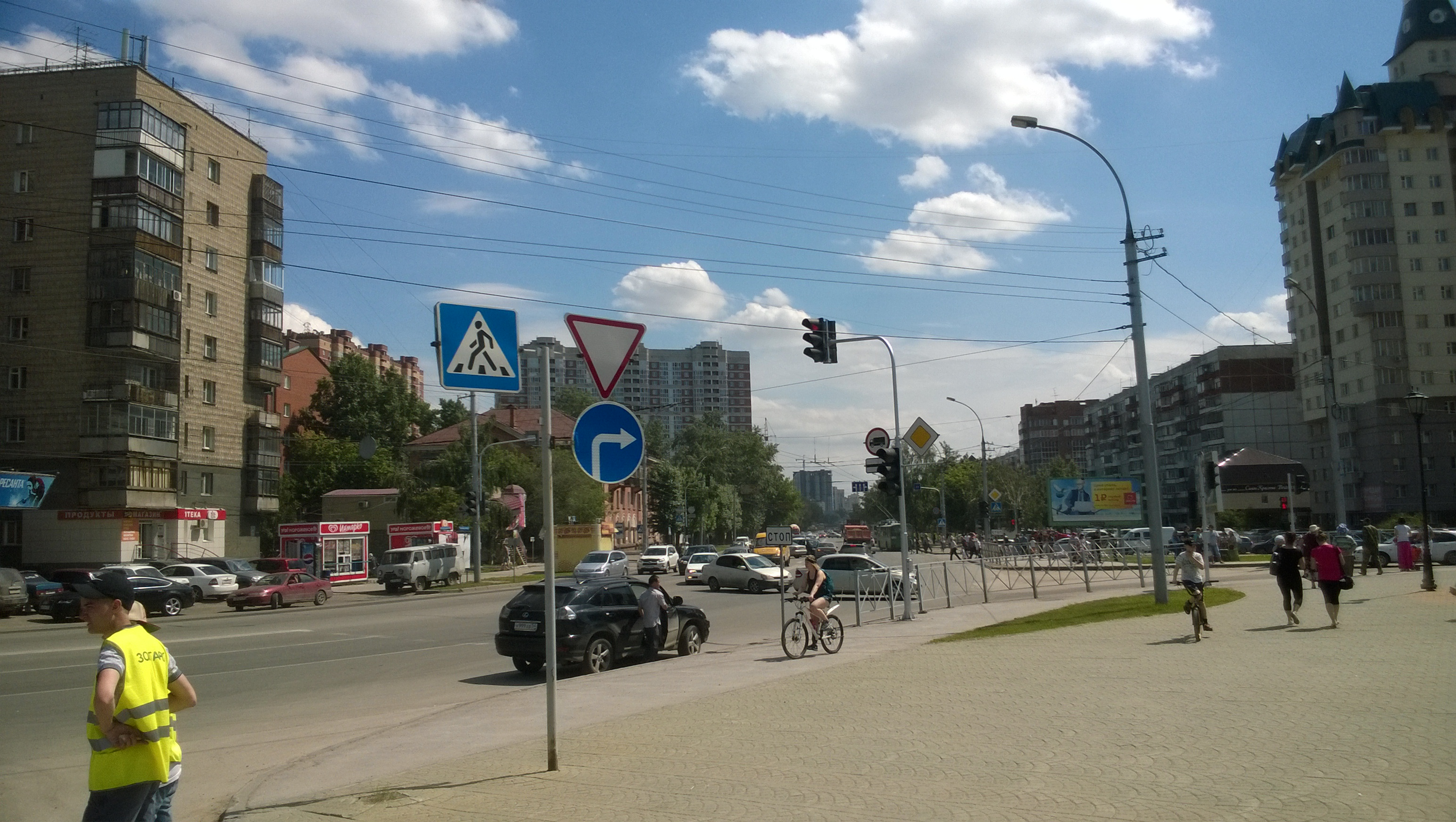
Planovaya Street

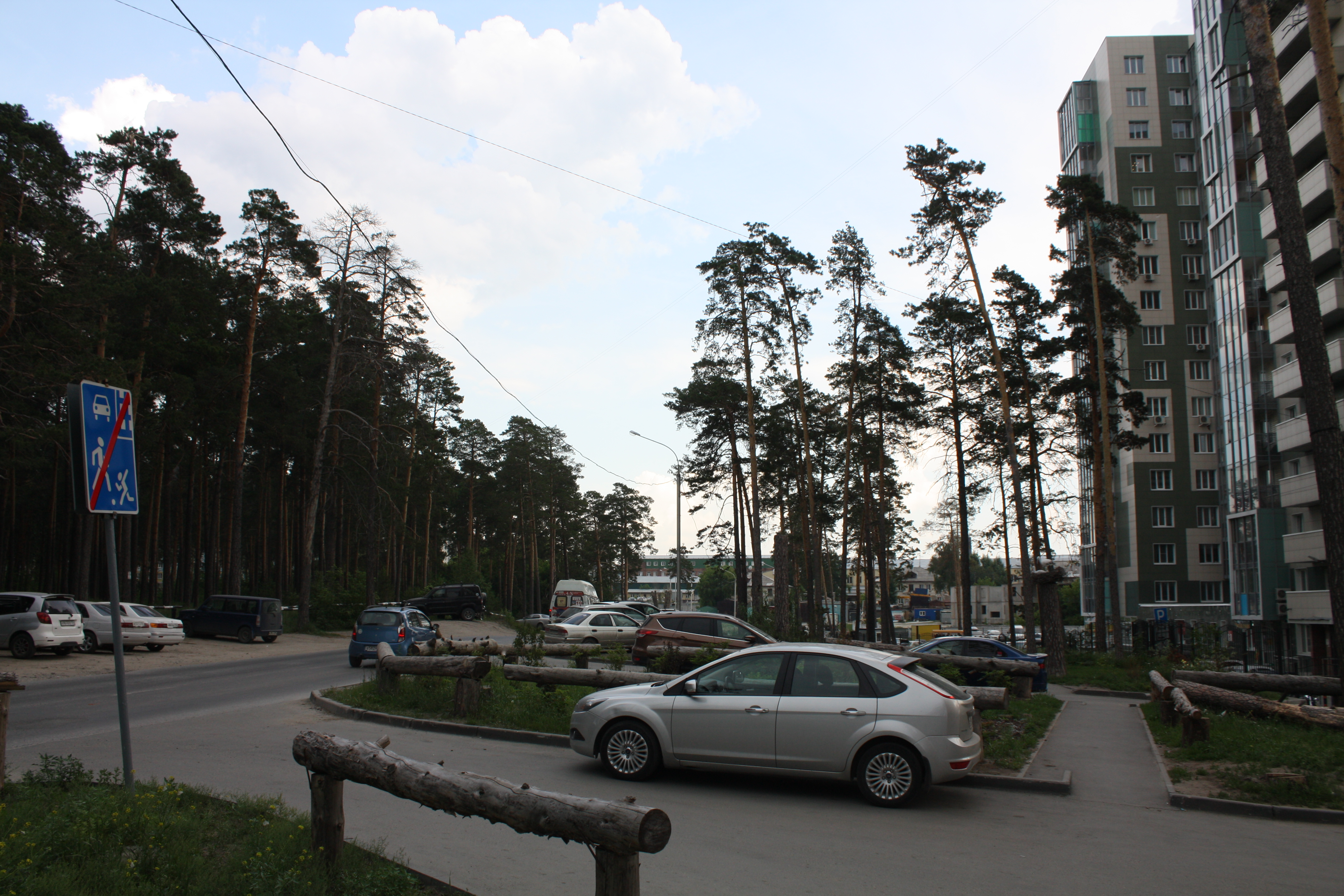
Sukharnaya Street

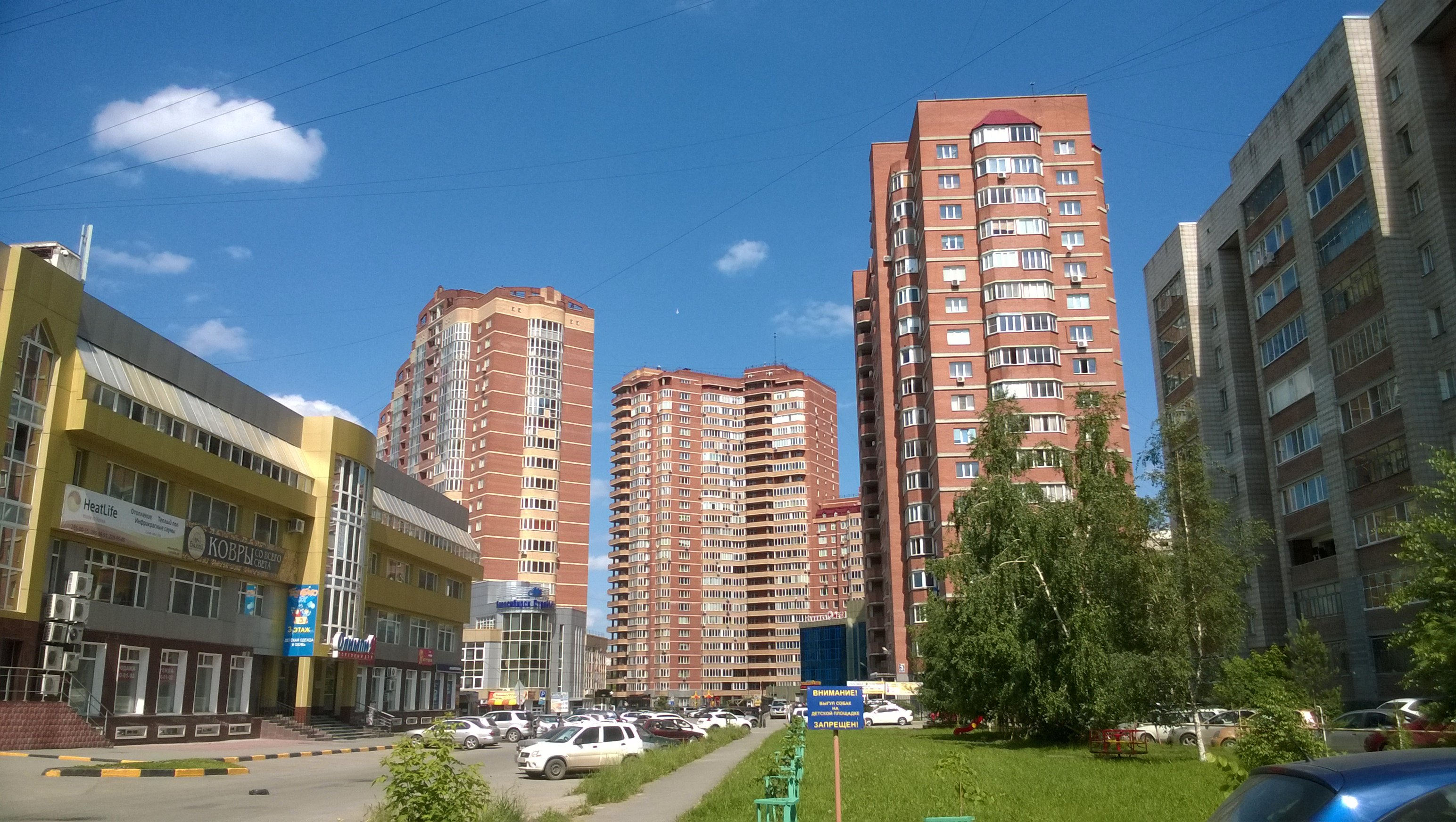
Galushchak Street

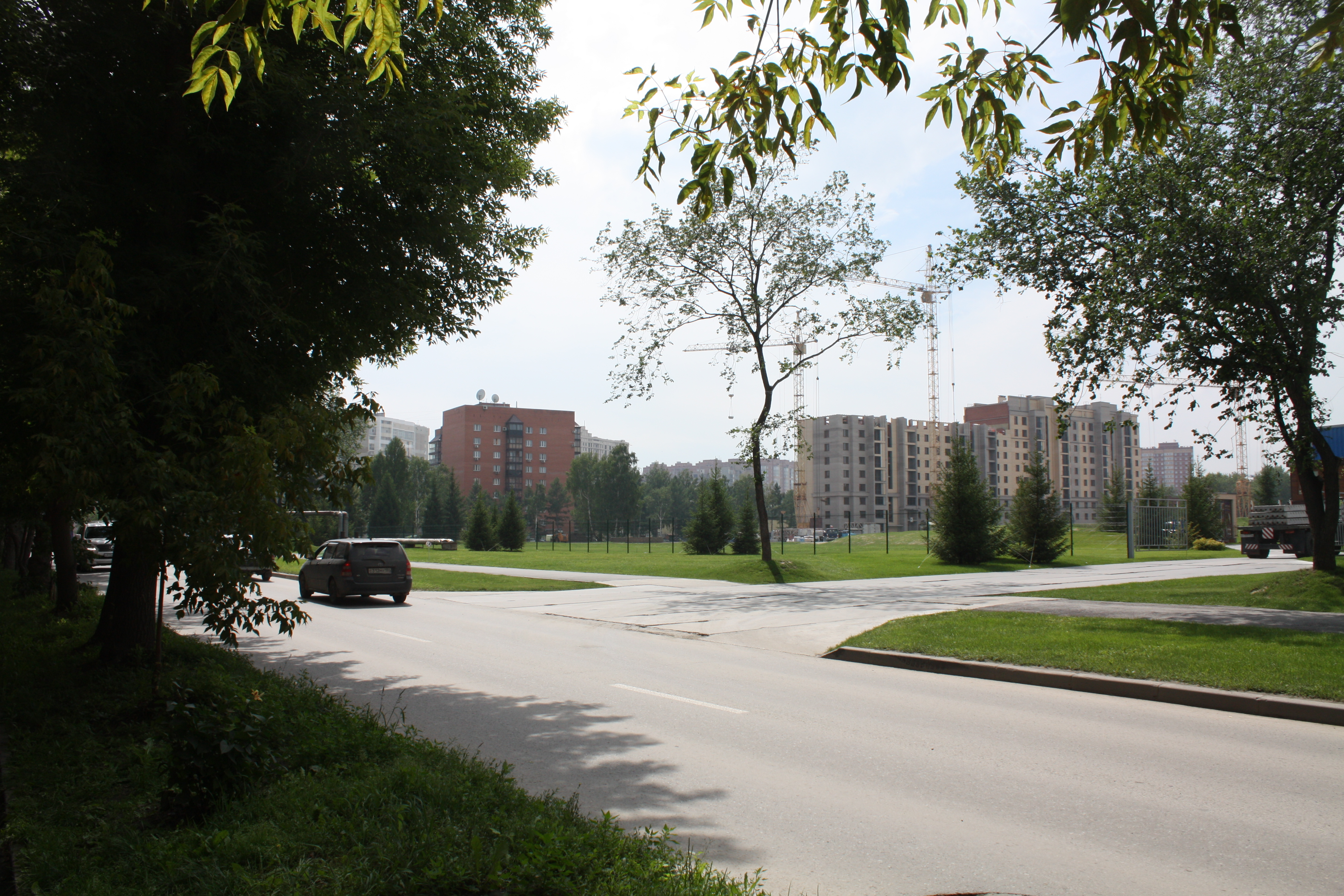
Dachnaya Street

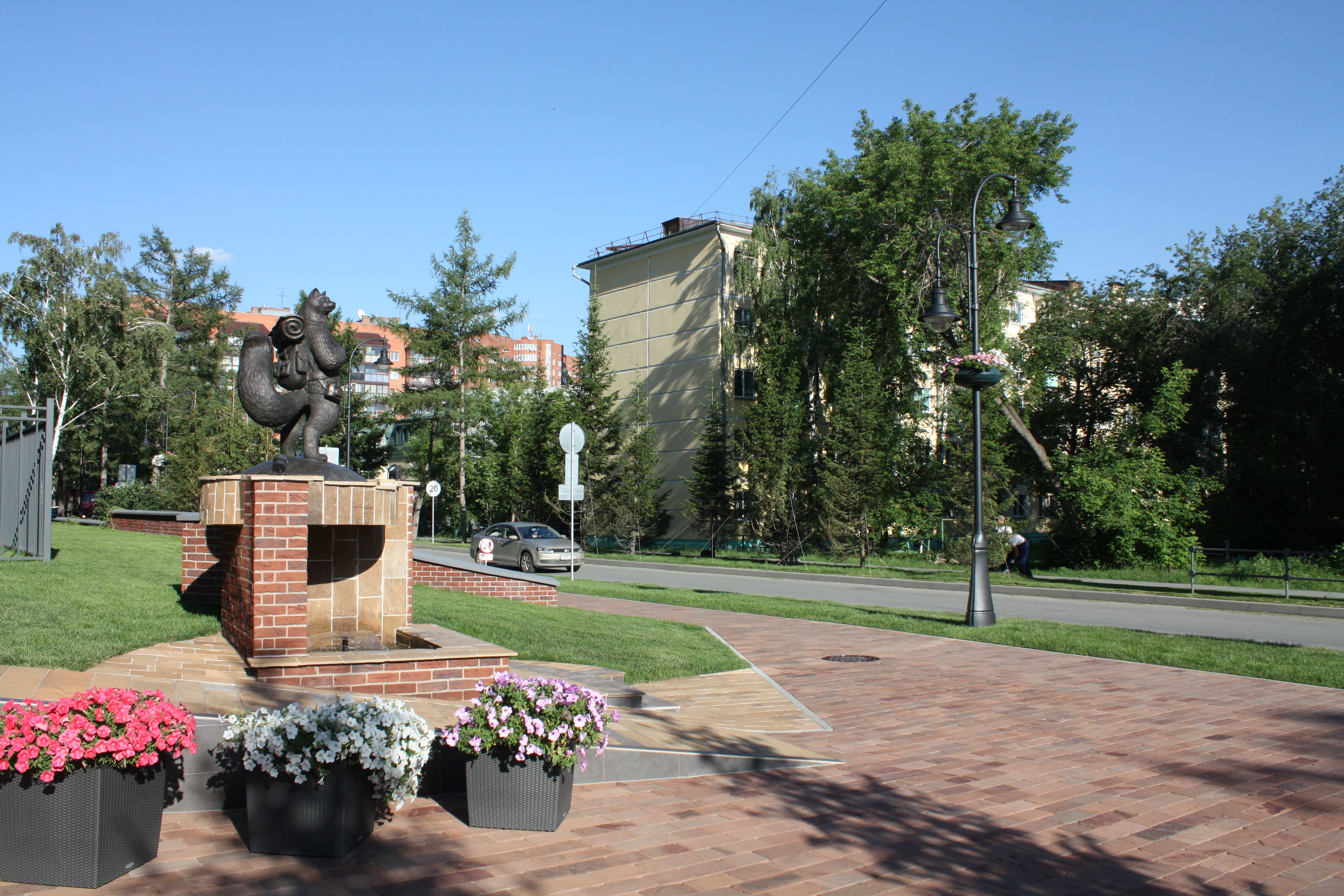
Timiryazev Street

== Architecture ==
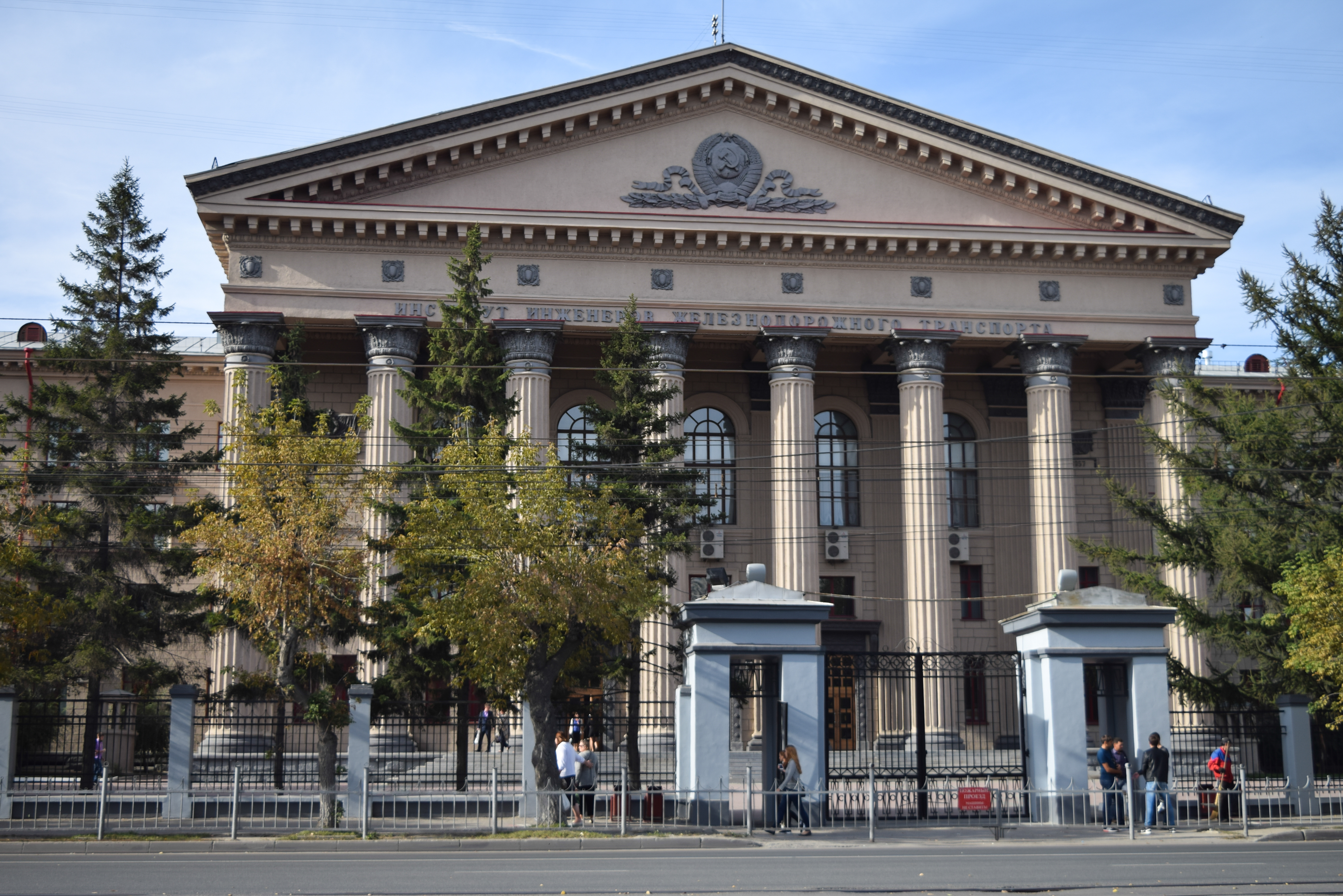
Siberian Transport University (1955)

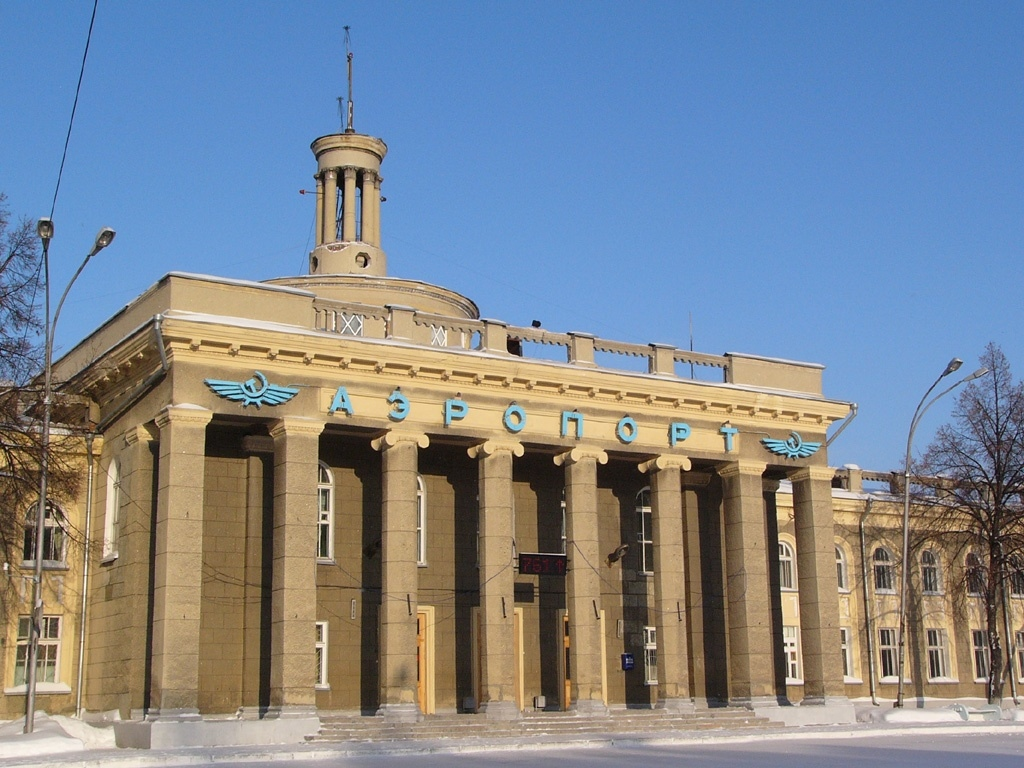
Severny Airport Building (1957)

== Religion ==
=== Christianity ===
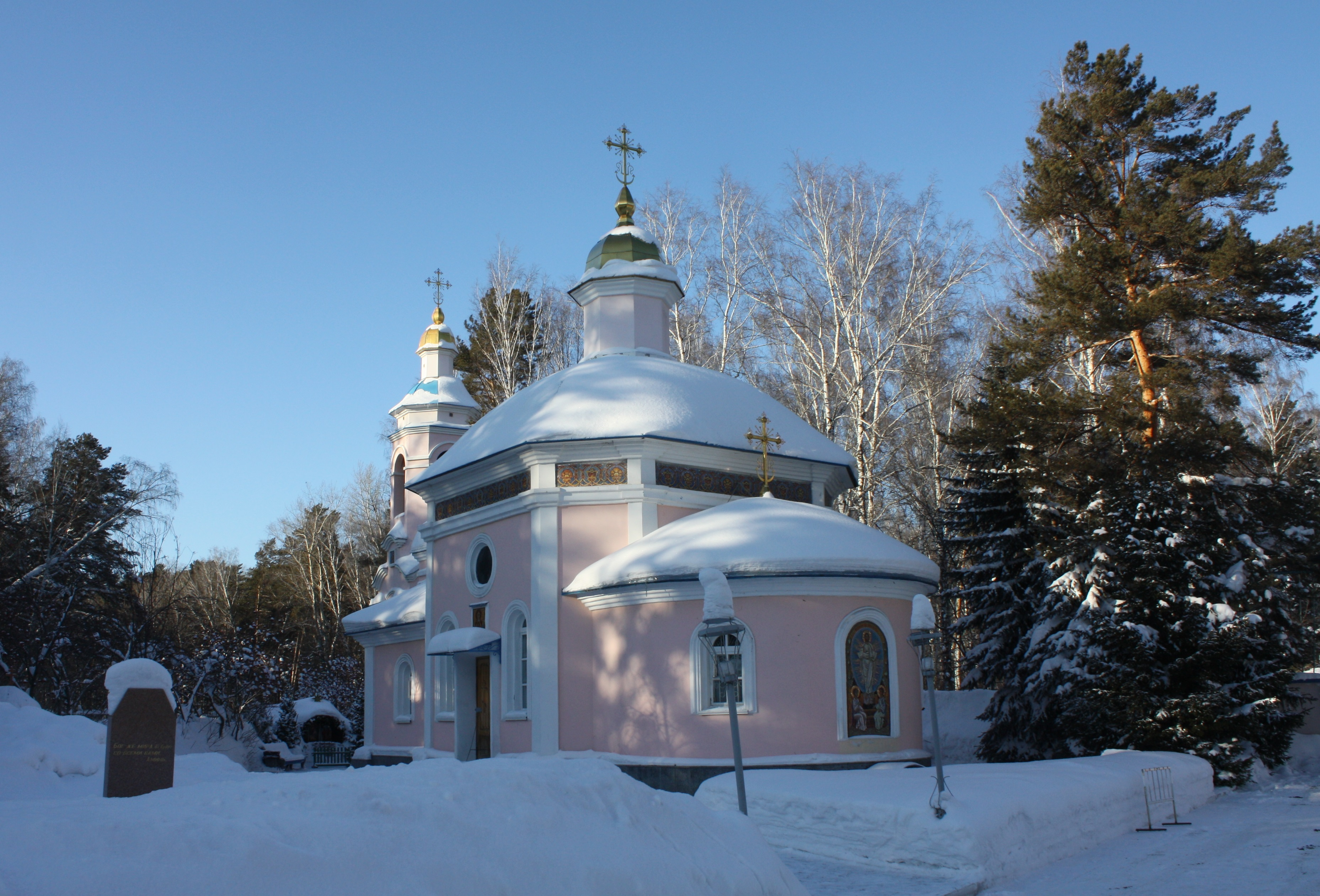
Church of the Holy Martyr Eugene

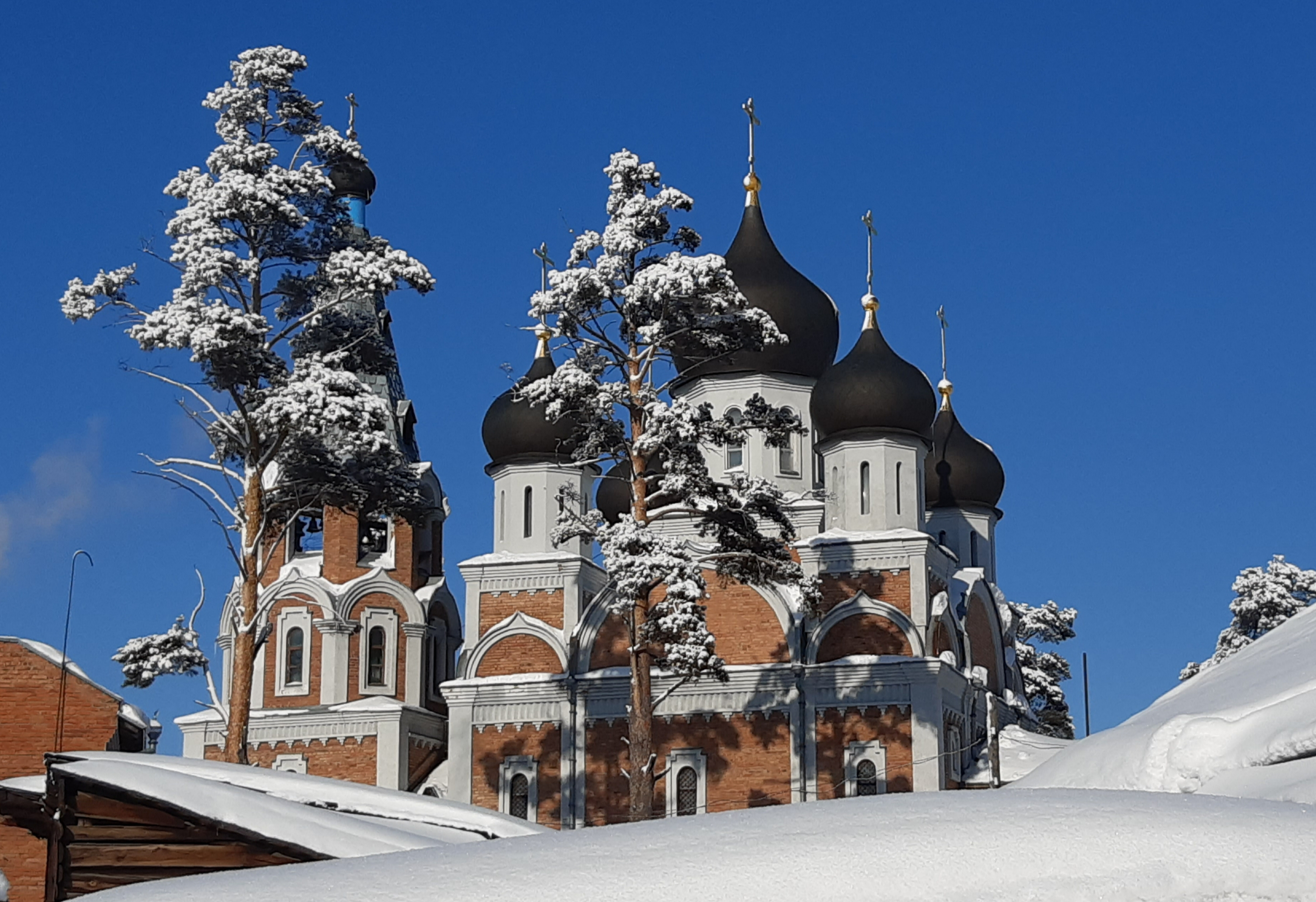
Cathedral of the Nativity of the Blessed Virgin Mary

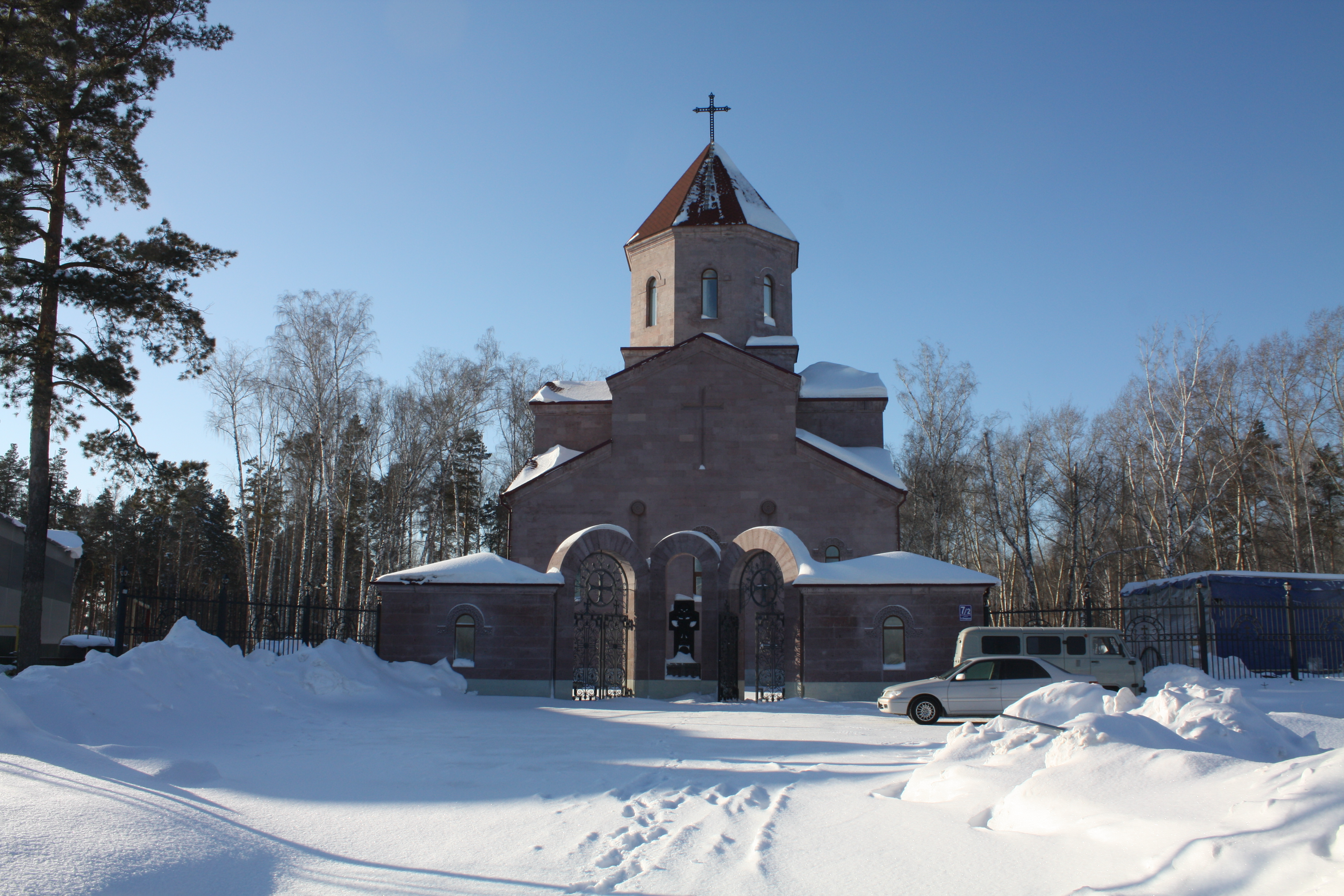
Armenian Apostolic Church

== Zayeltsovsky Bor ==
Zayeltsovsky Bor is a pine forest. Its territory covers 3,100 hectares.

=== Tourist attractions in The Zayeltsovsky Bor ===
==== Novosibirsk Zoo ====
Novosibirsk Zoo is located in the Zayeltsovsky Bor. The zoo has around 11,000 animals (738 species).

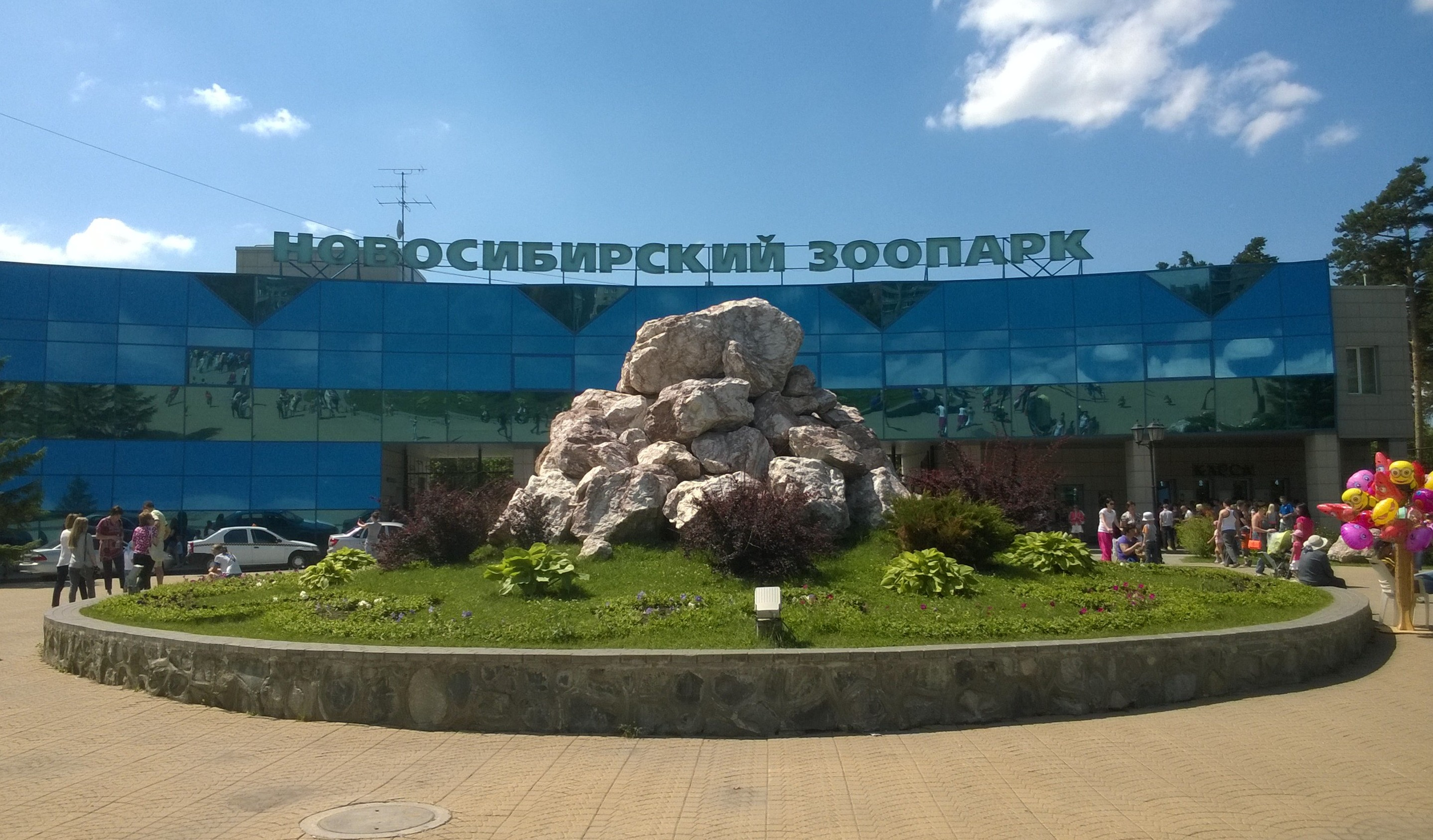

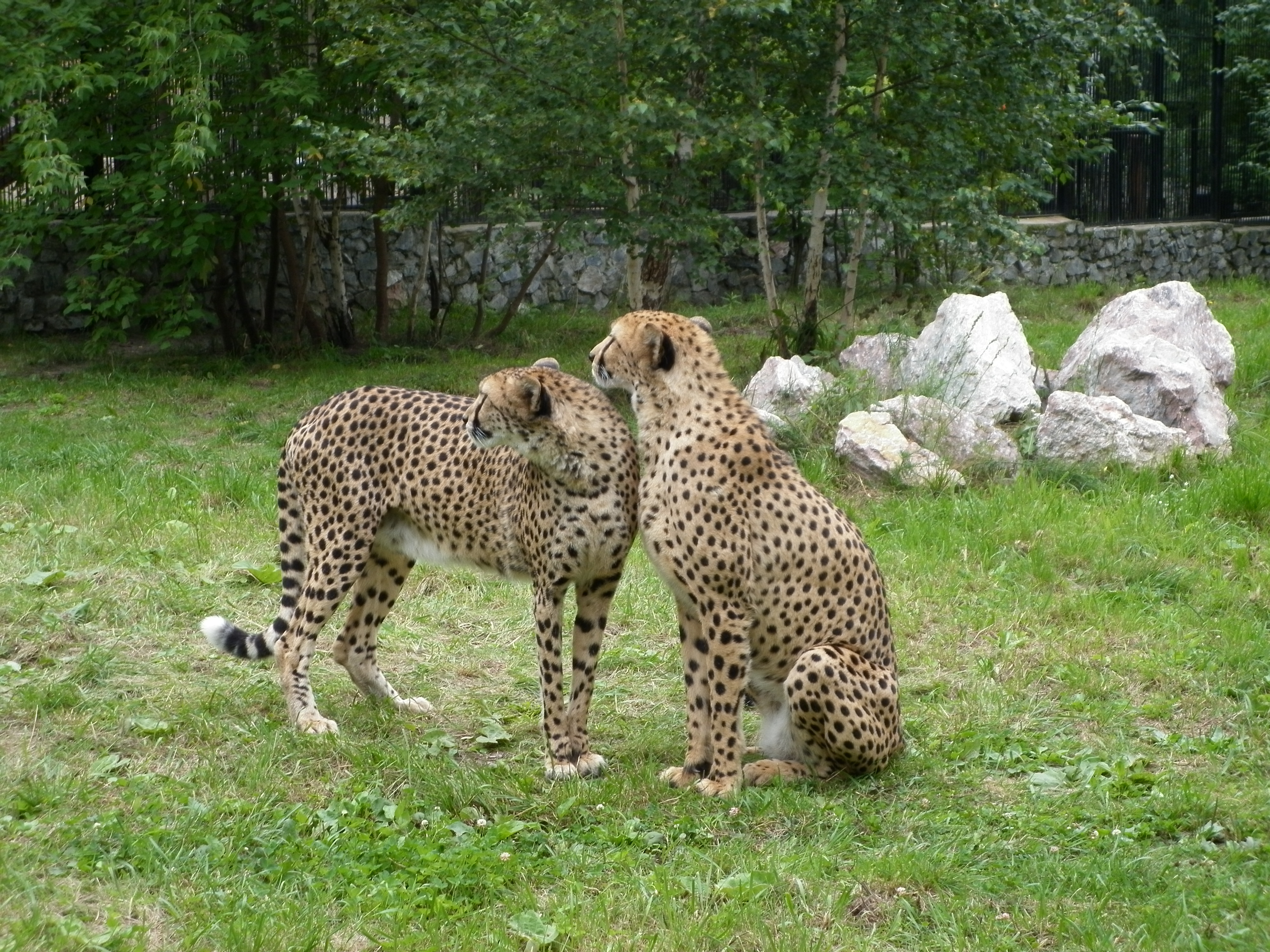

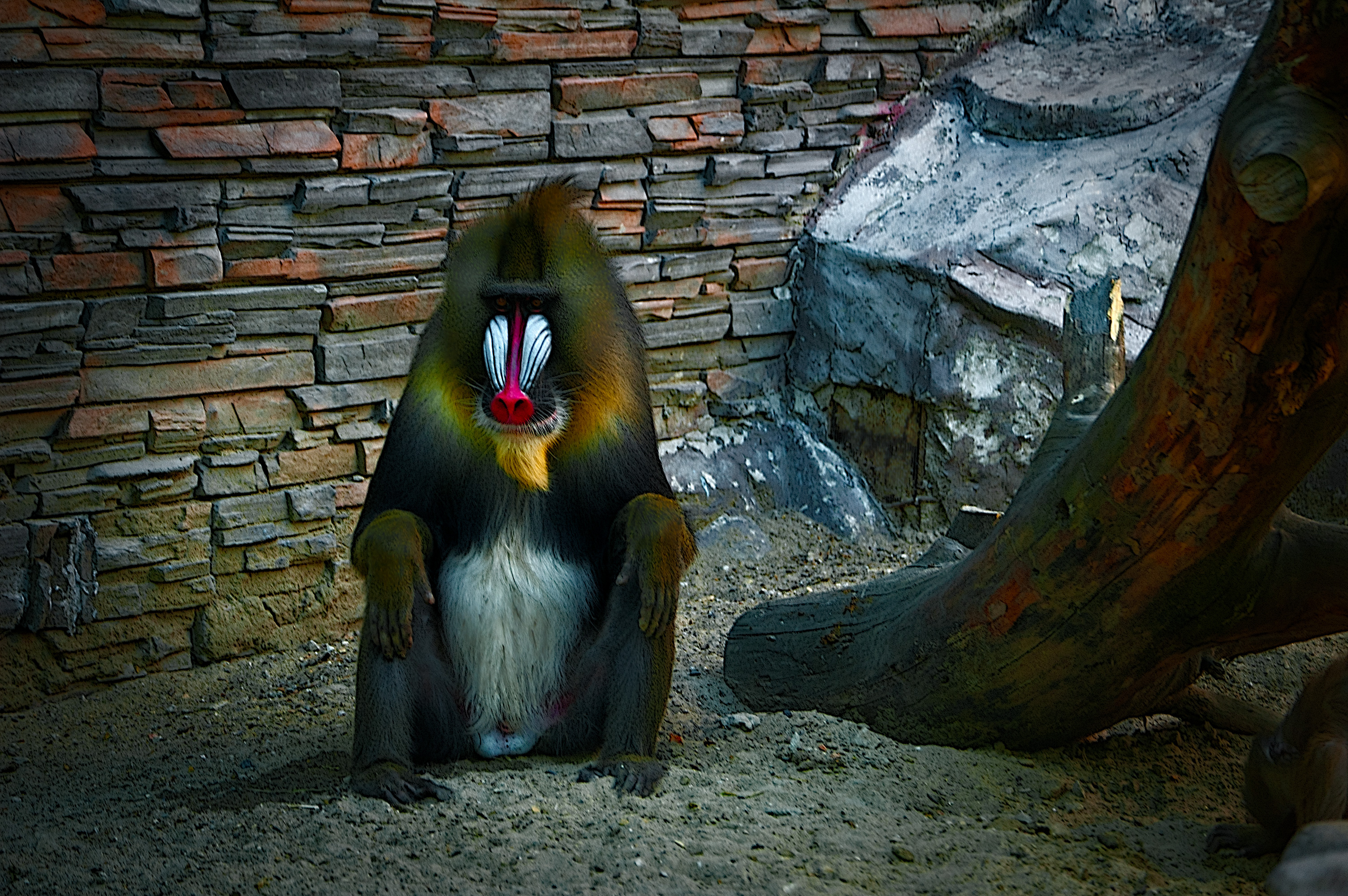

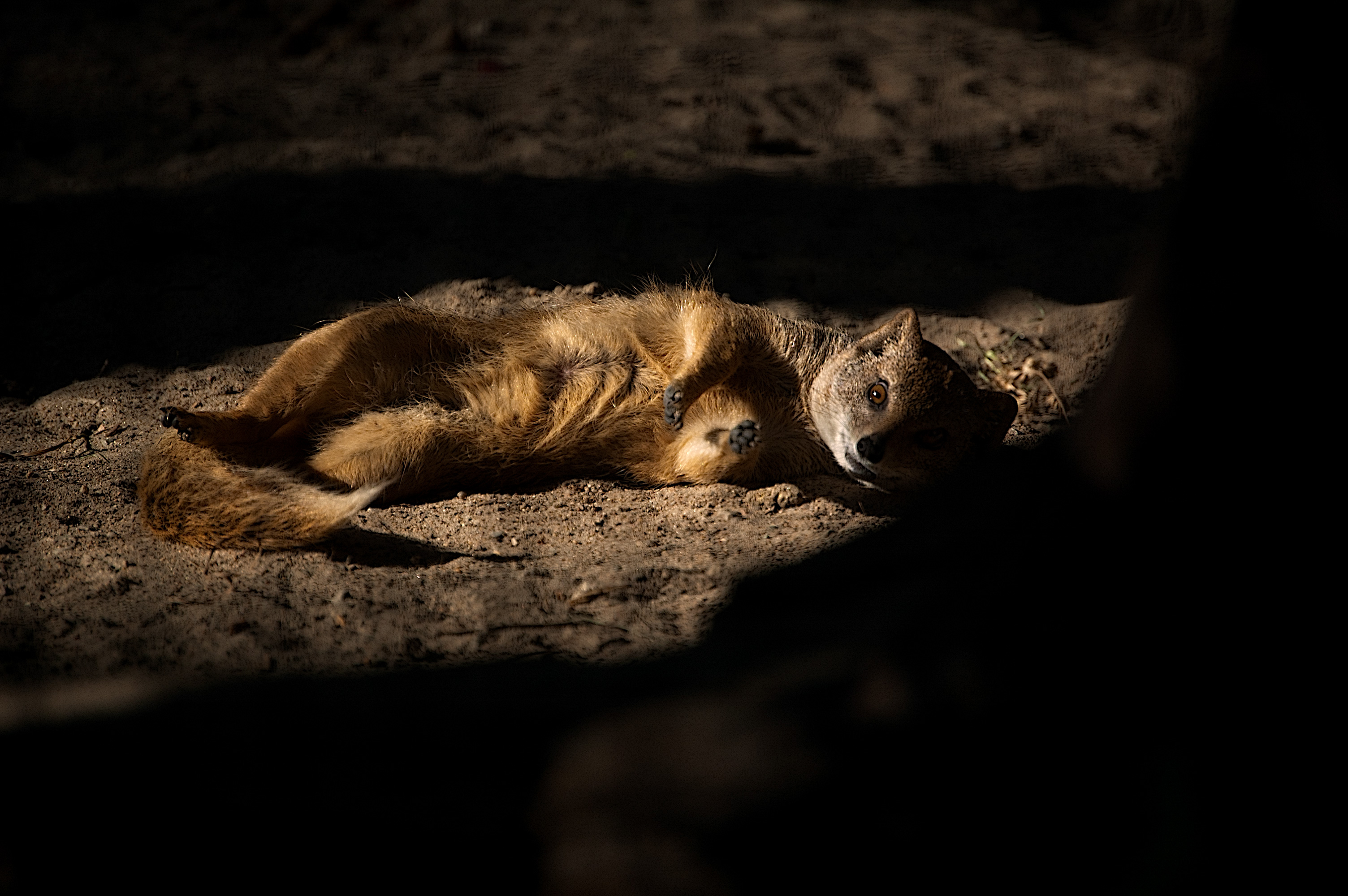

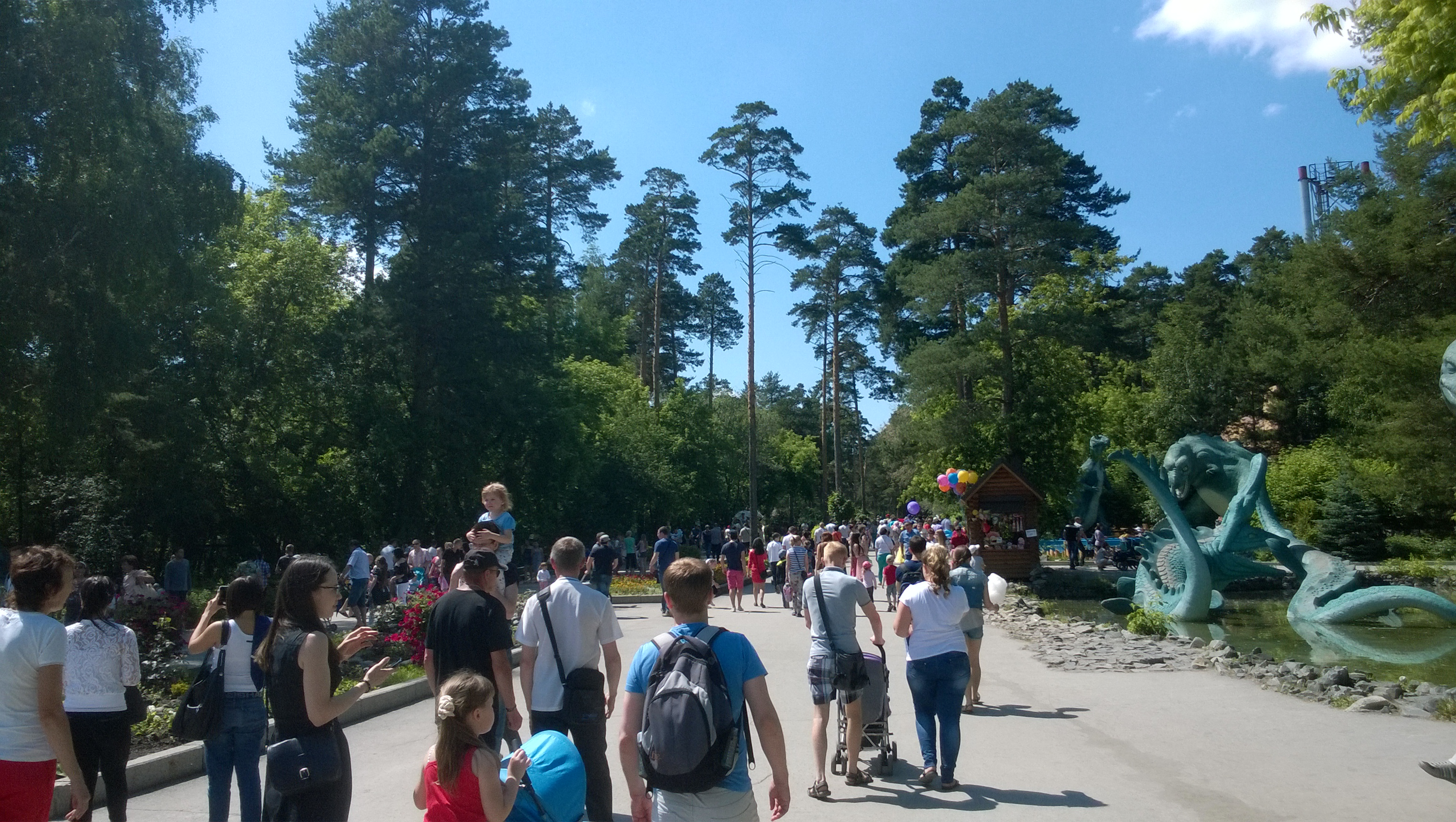

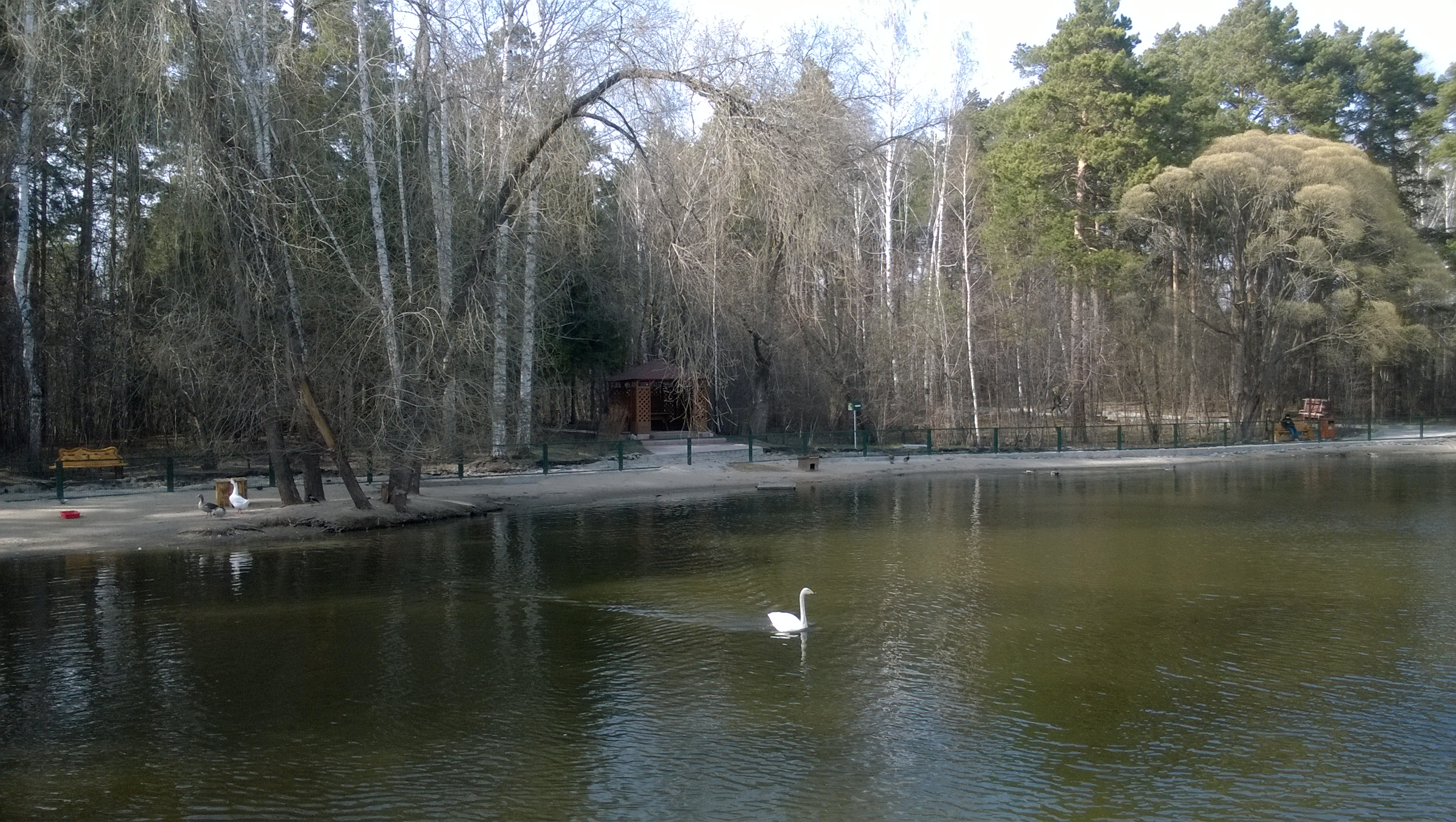

==== Zayeltsovsky Park ====
The Zayeltsovsky Park was opened in 1932.

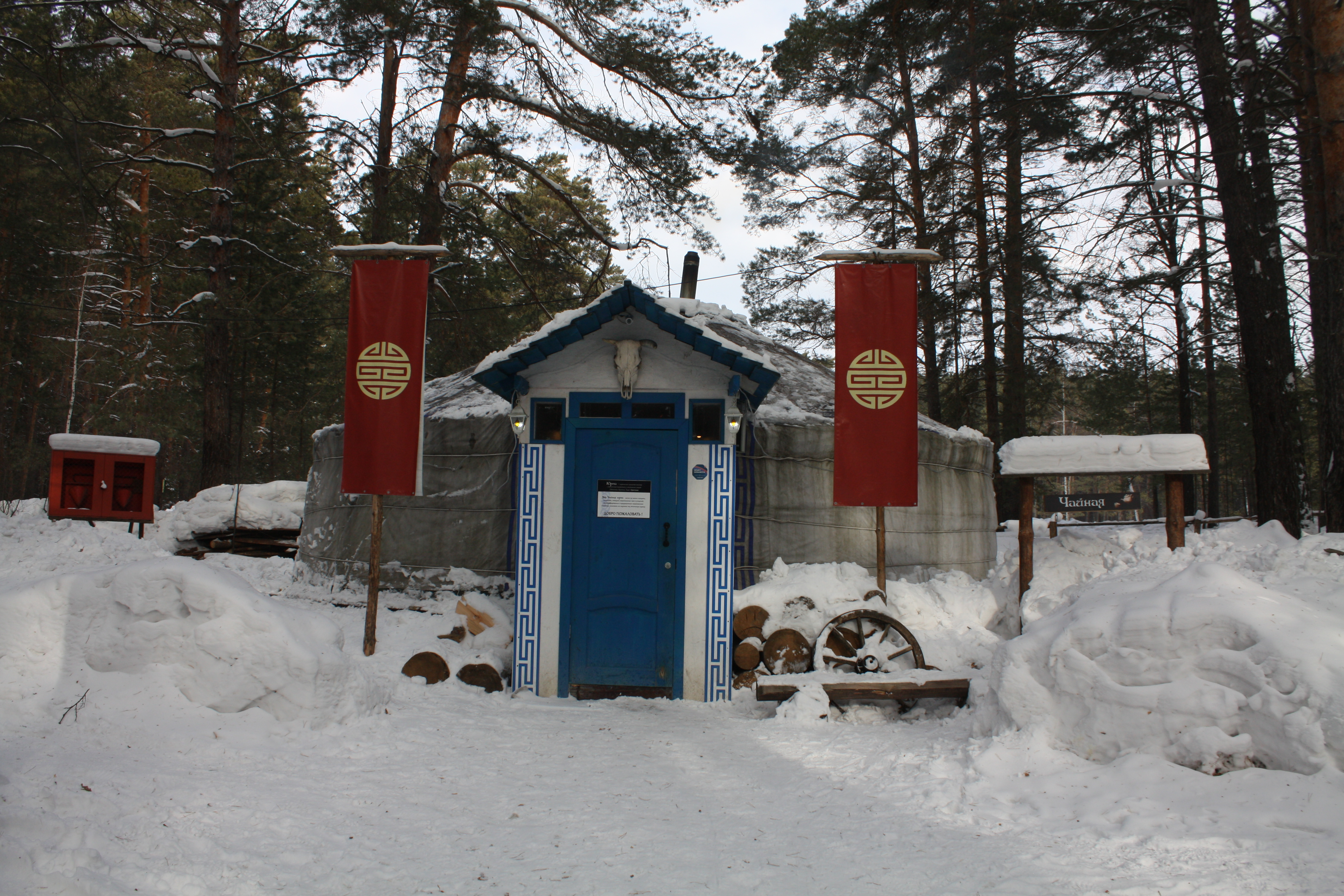

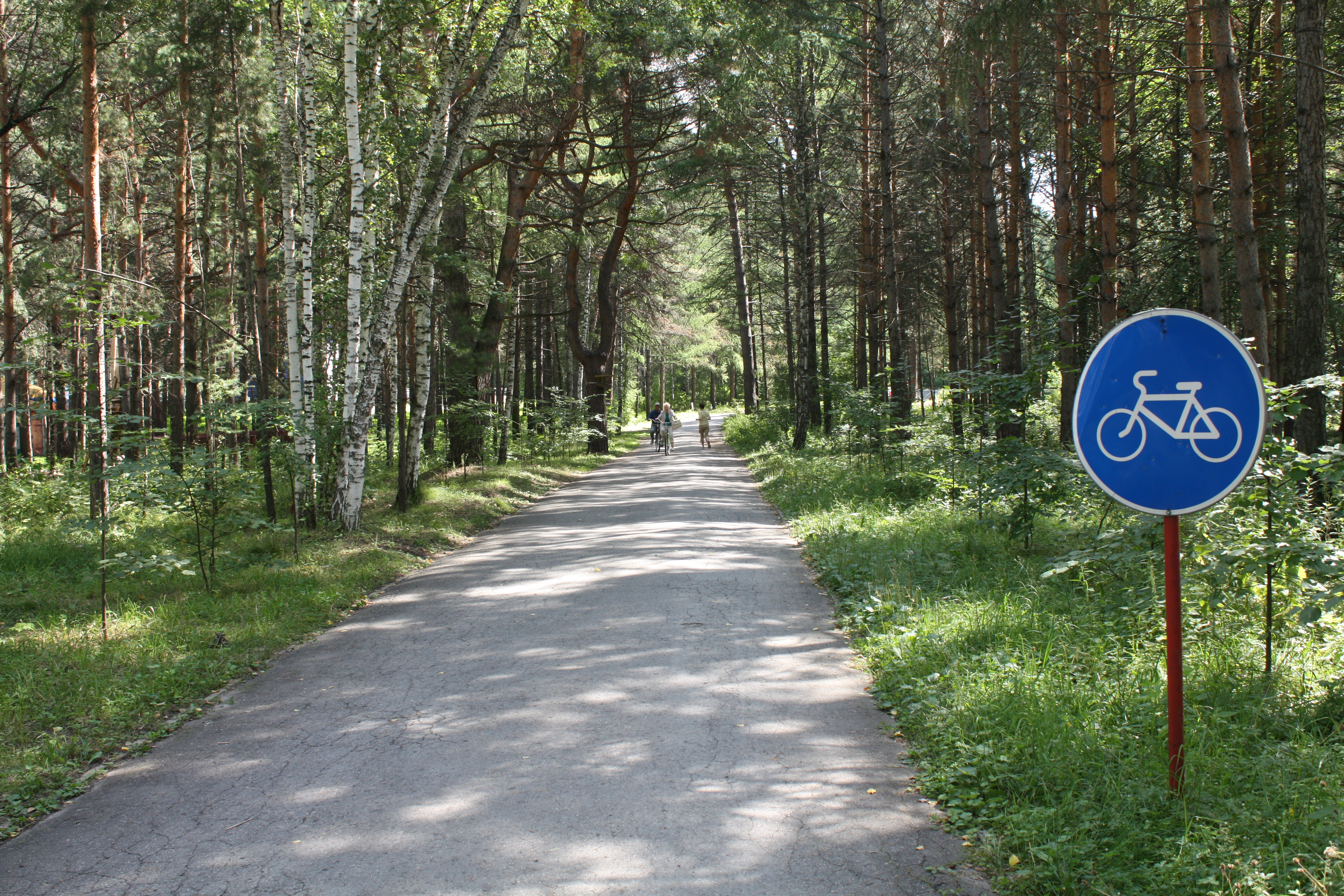

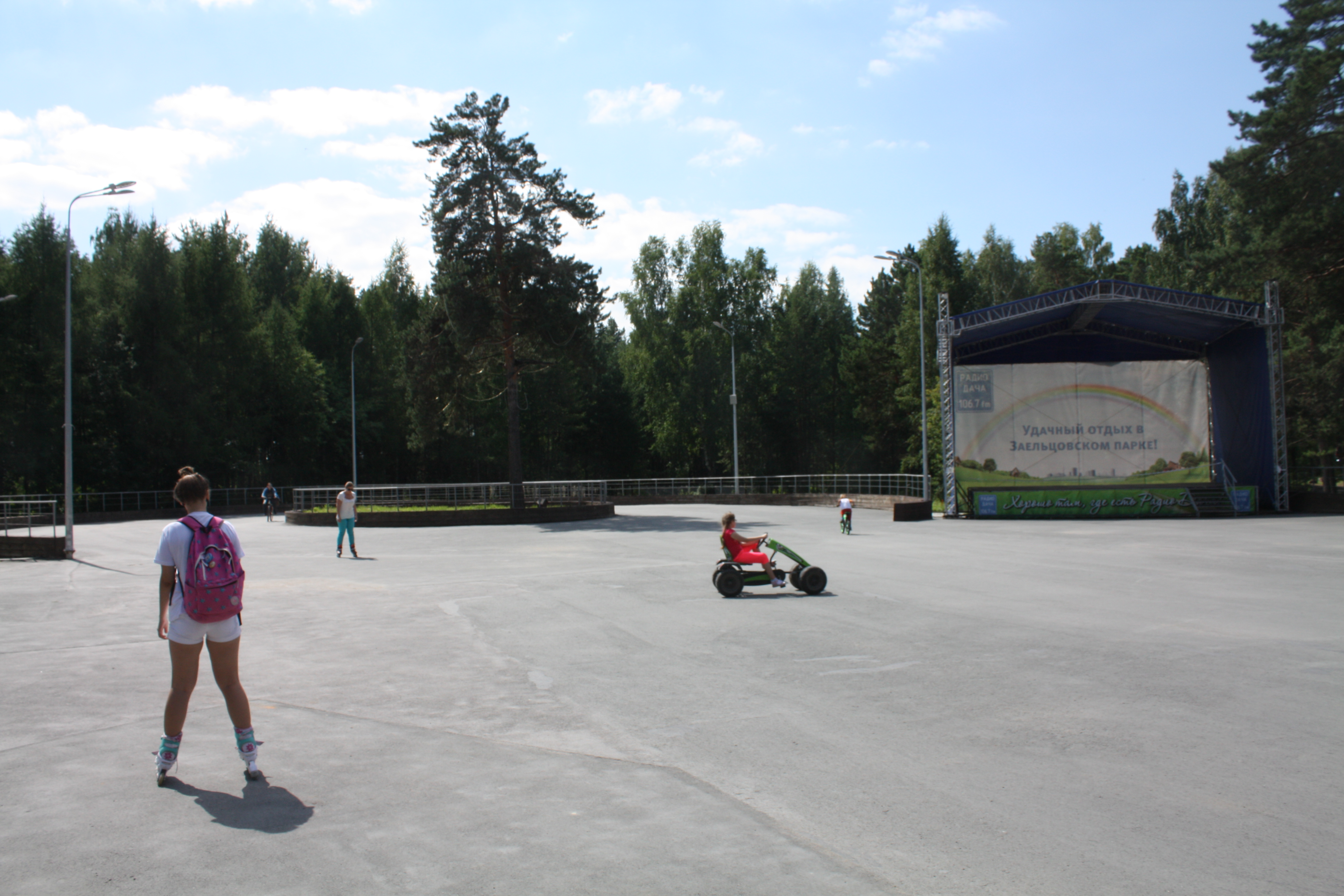

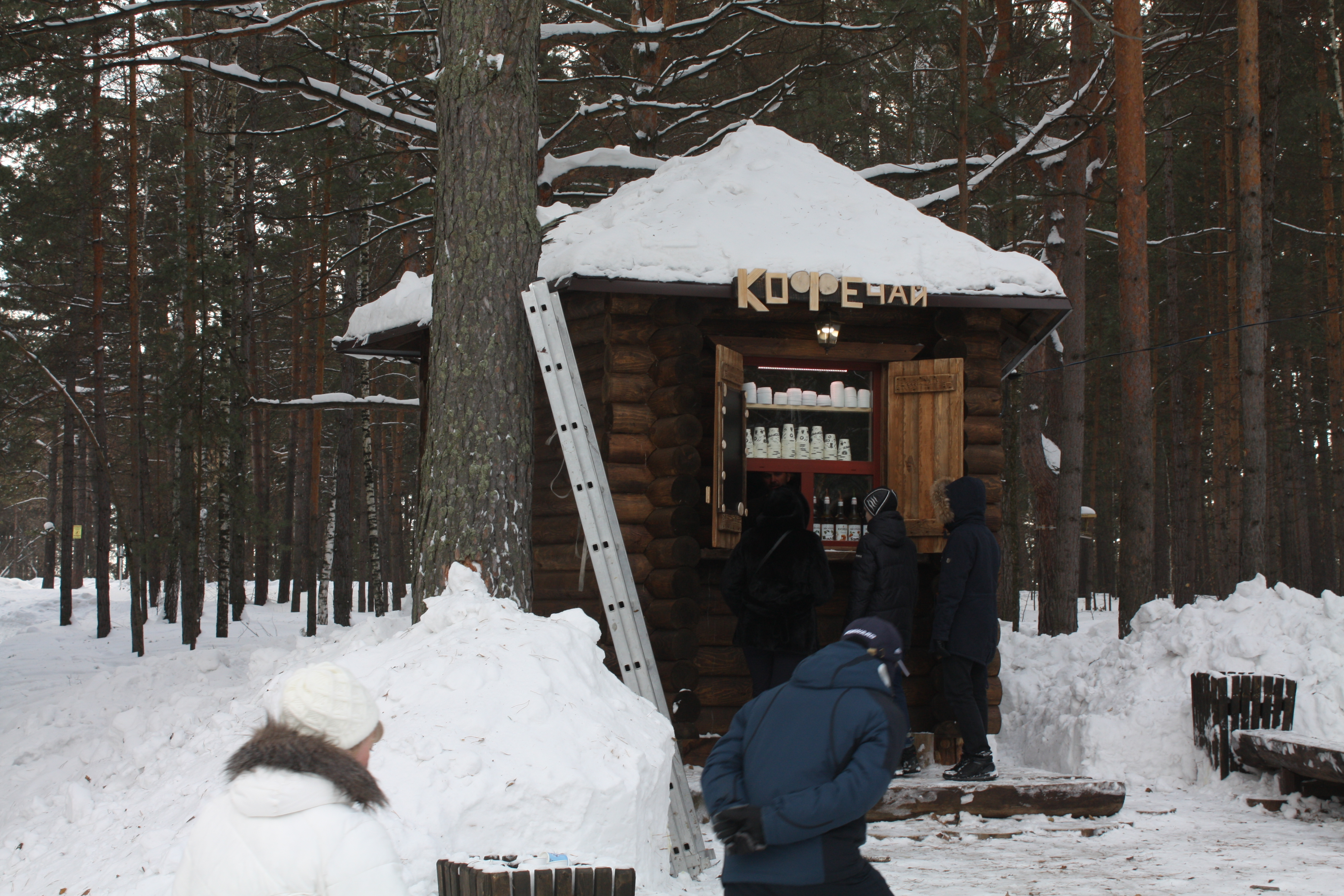

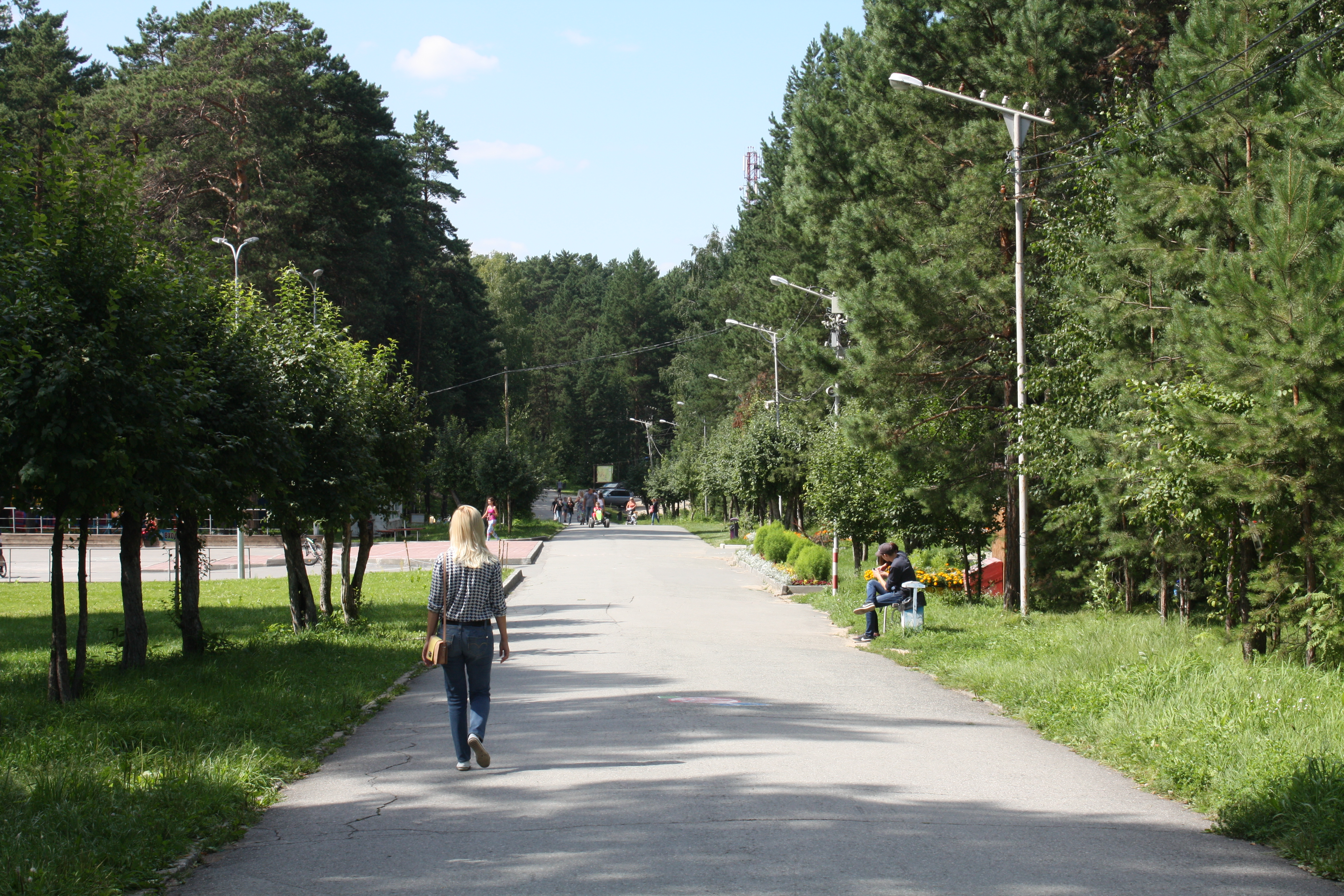

==== Small West Siberian Railway ====
The Small West Siberian Railway or Novosibirsk Children's Railway is a children's railway, opened on 4 June 2005.

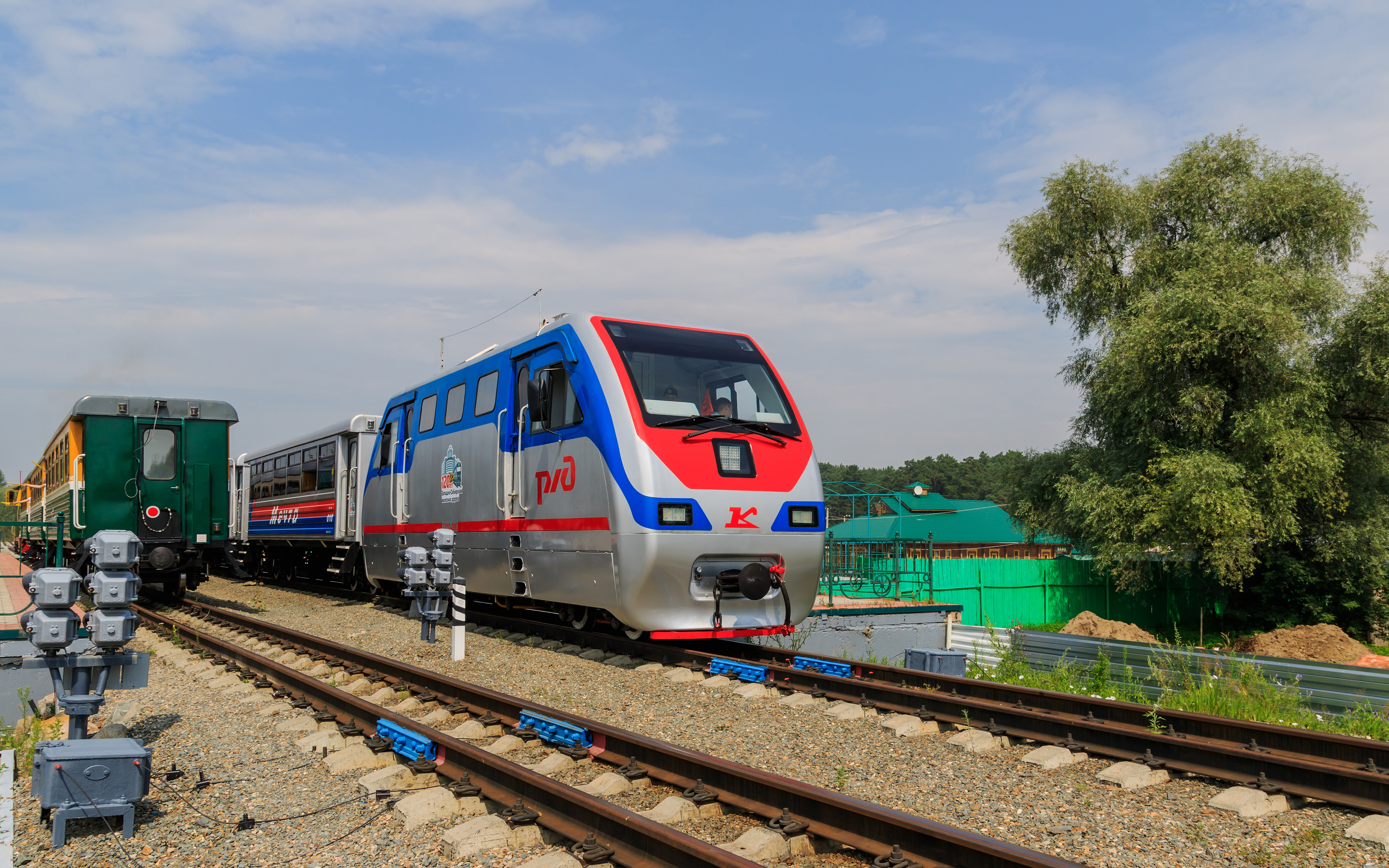

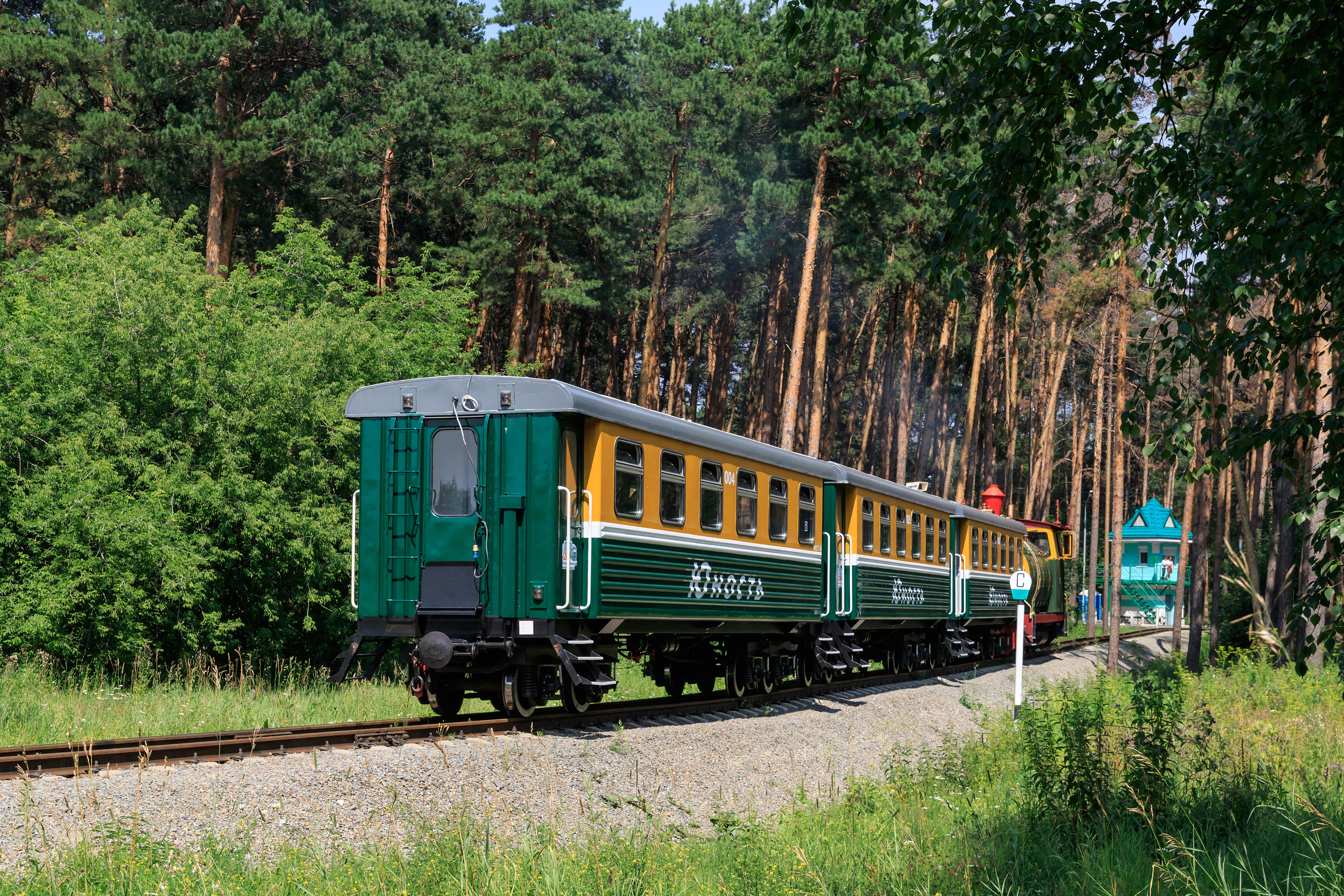

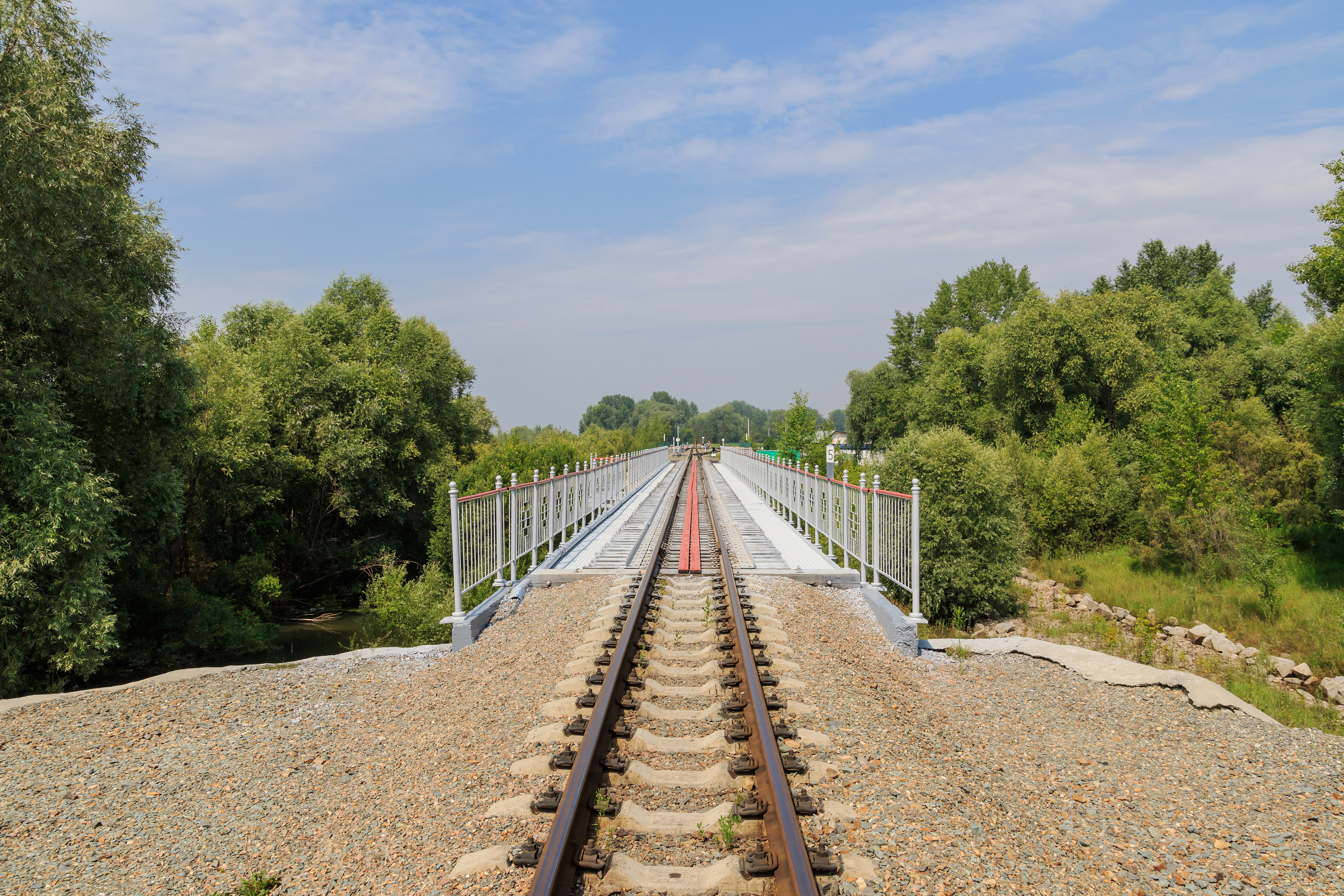

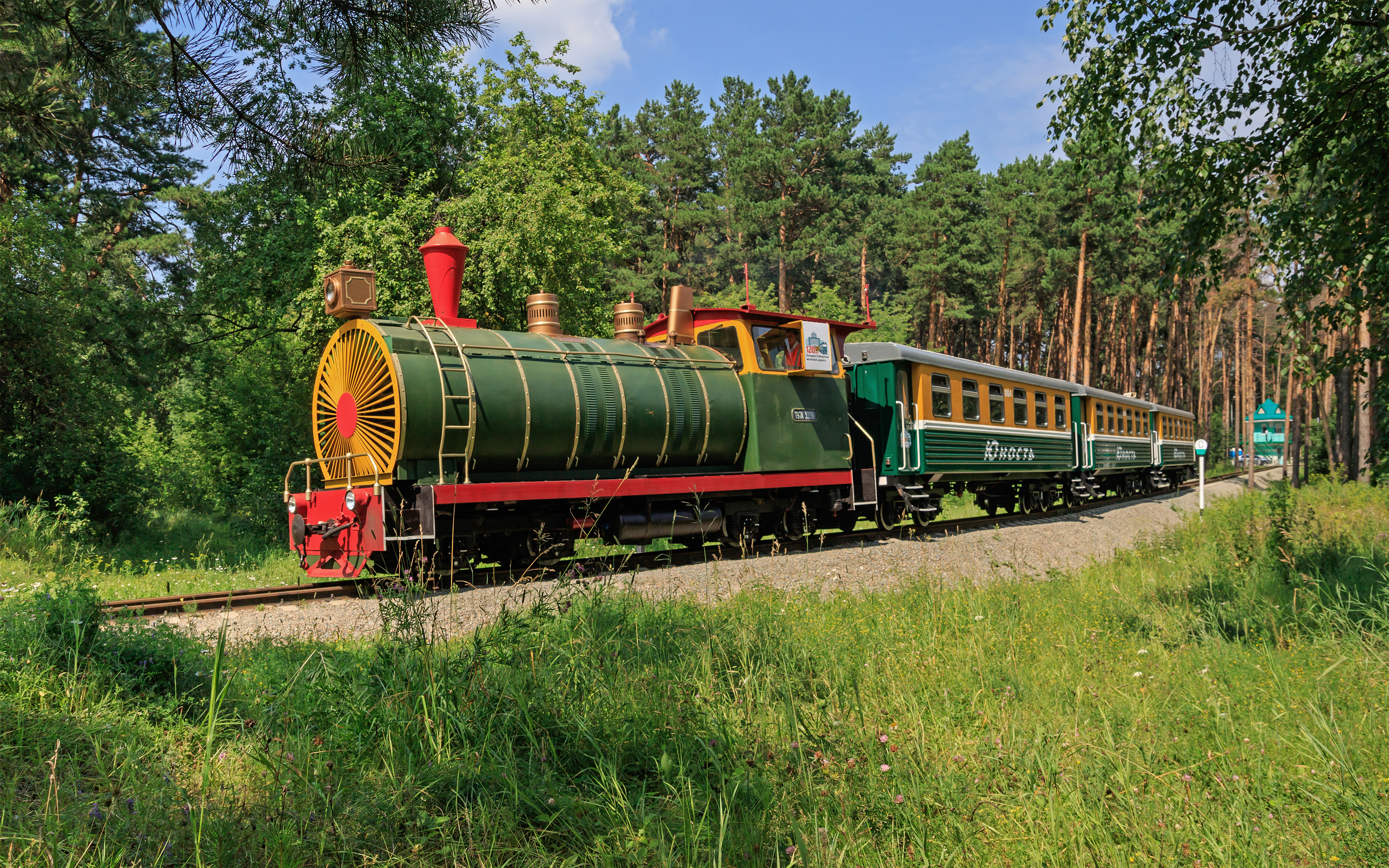

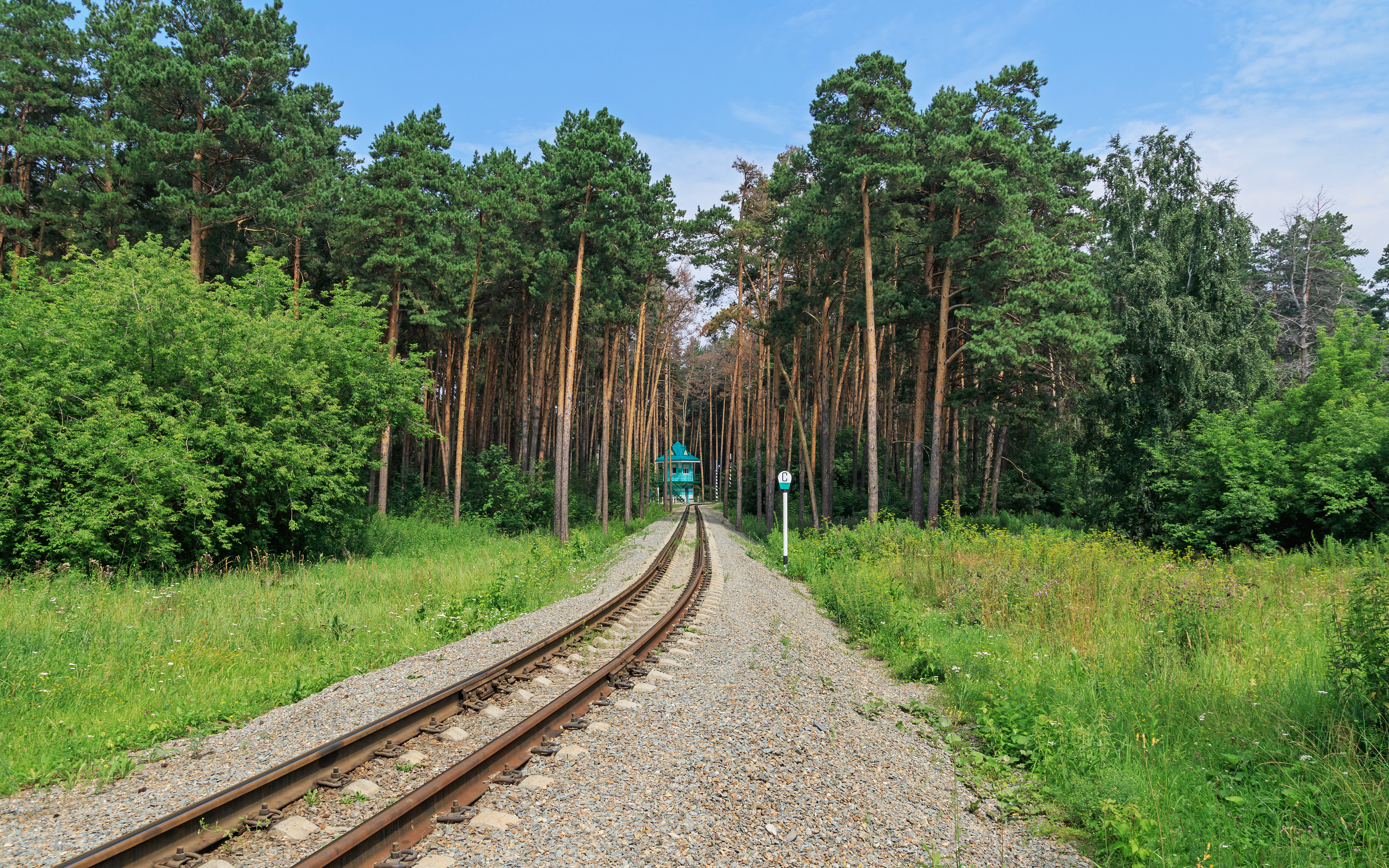

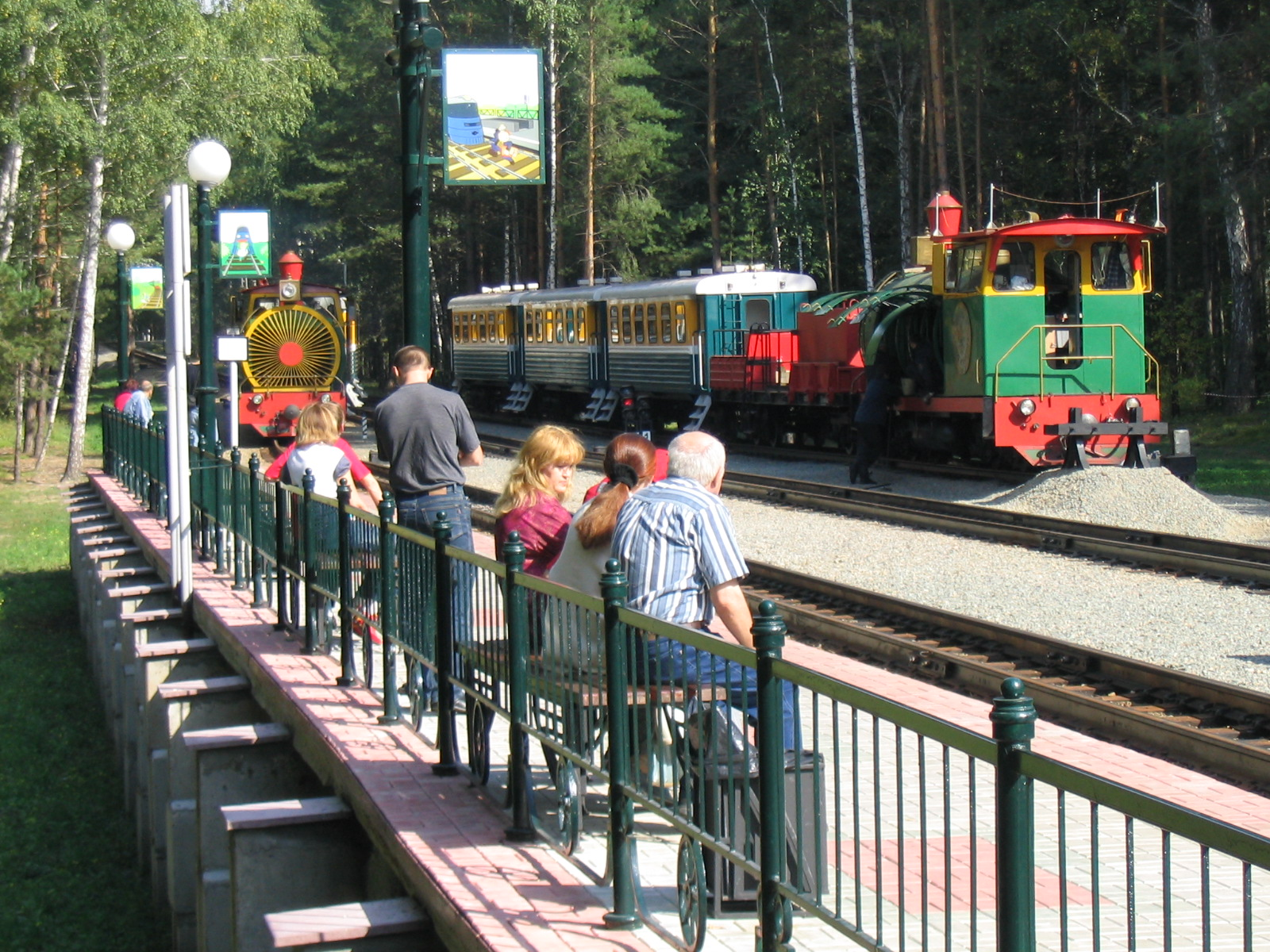

=== Zayeltsovskoye Cemetery ===
The Zayeltsovskoye Cemetery is a cemetery in the Zayeltsovsky Bor. The area of the graveyard is about 200 hectares.

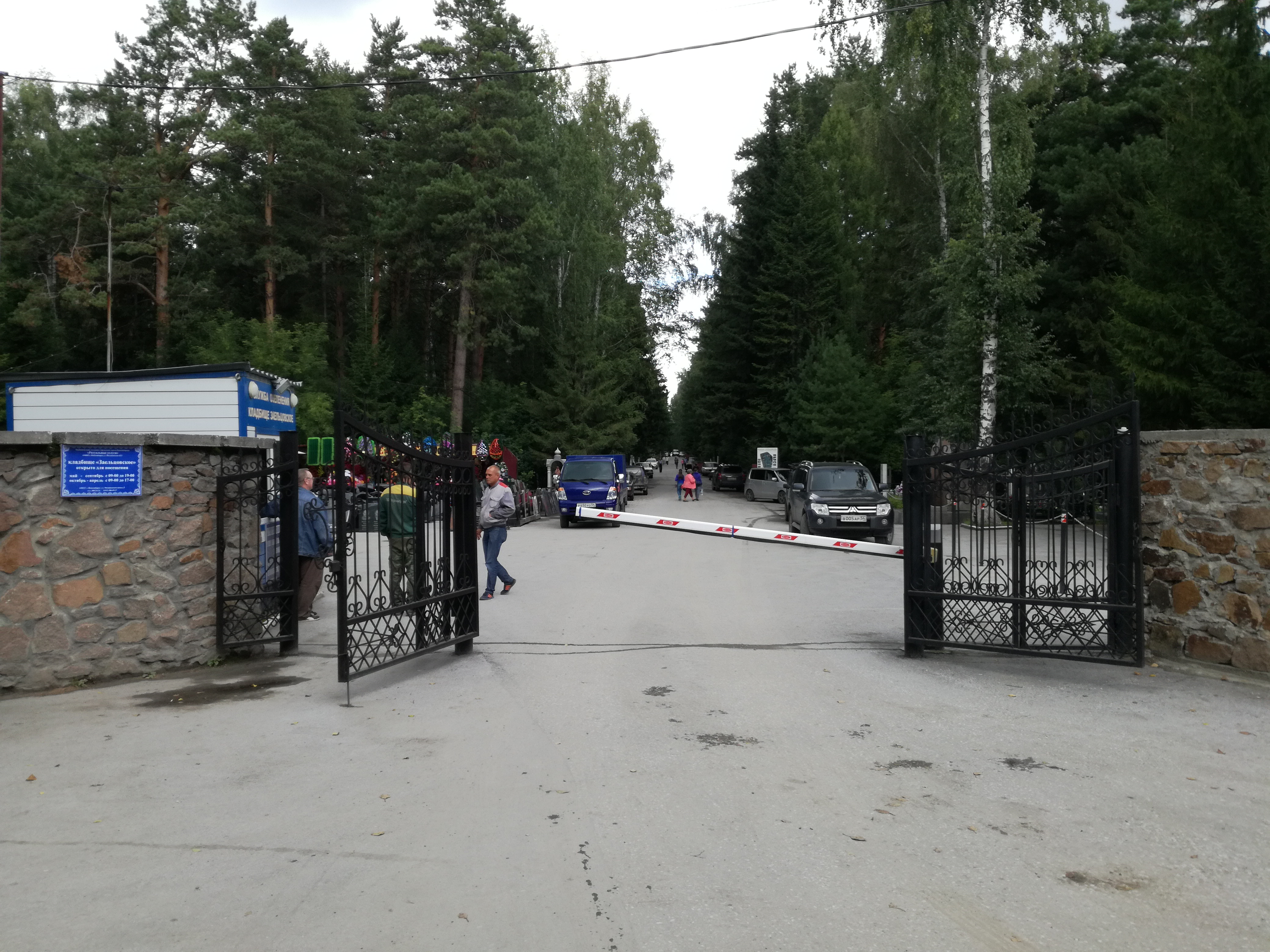

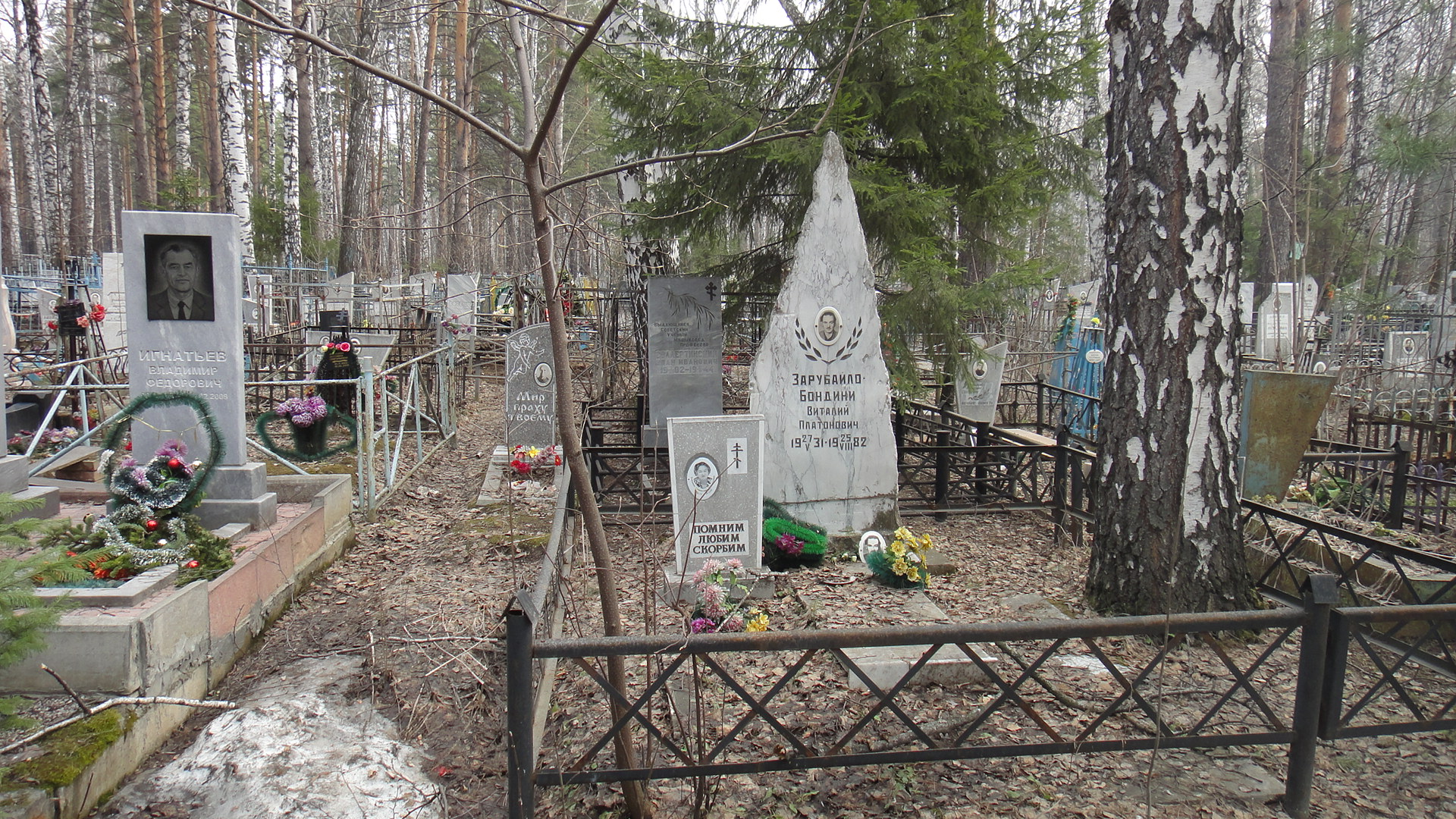

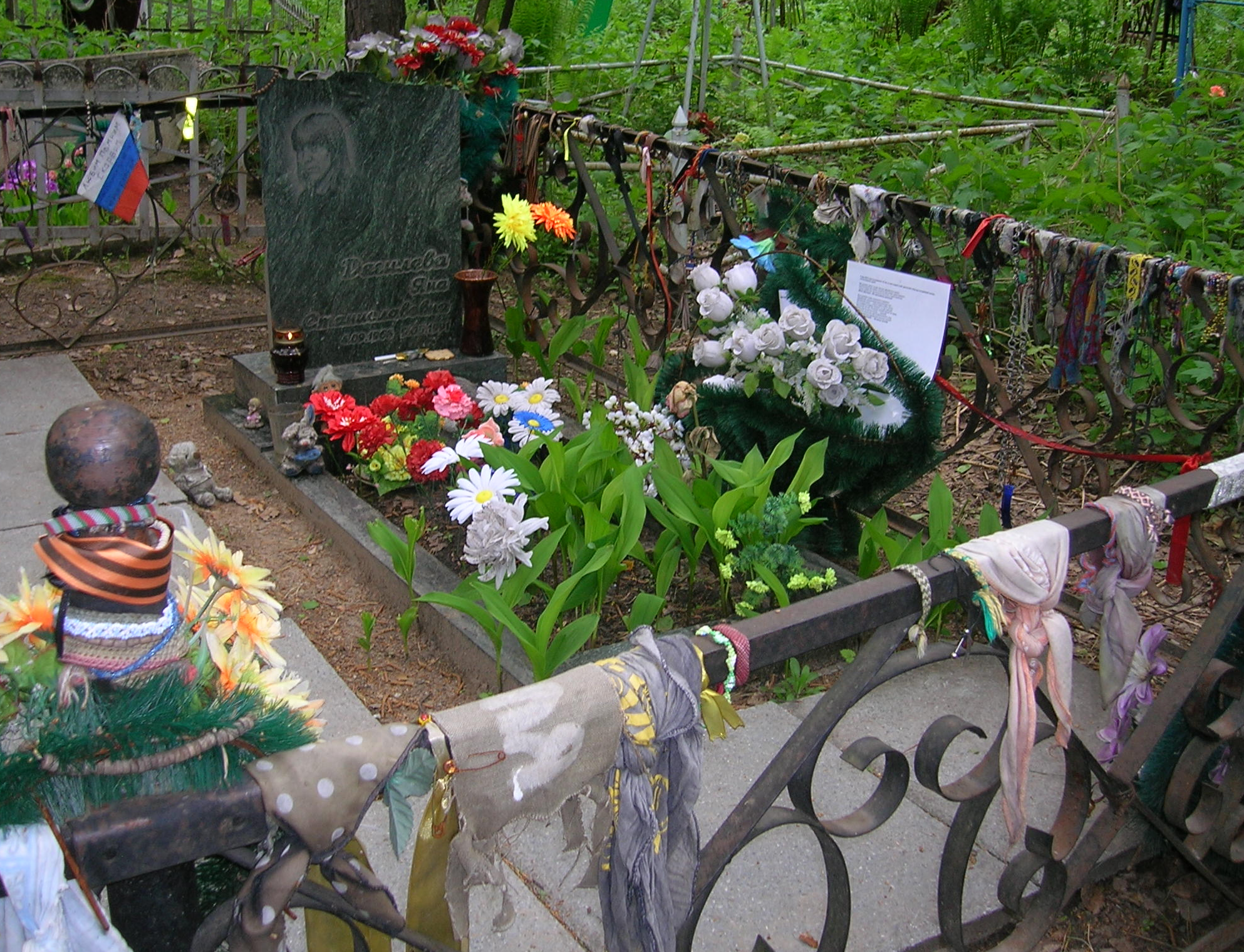
Yanka Dyagileva's grave

== Economy ==
=== Industry ===
- Ekran Plant
- Novosibirsk Electrovacuum Plant (NEVZ-Soyuz)
- Novosibirsk Instrument-Building Plant
- Novosibirsk Meat Canning Plant
- Novosibirsk Plant of Semiconductor Devices

== Education ==
- Novosibirsk State Medical University
- Siberian State Transport University
- Siberian Cadet Corps
- Siberian Independent Institute
- Novosibirsk Medical College

== Medicine ==
- City Hospital No. 1
- Novosibirsk gerontological center
- Novosibirsk TB Research Institute

== Transportation ==
=== Railway ===
One railway stations is located in the district (Gagarinskaya Railway Station).

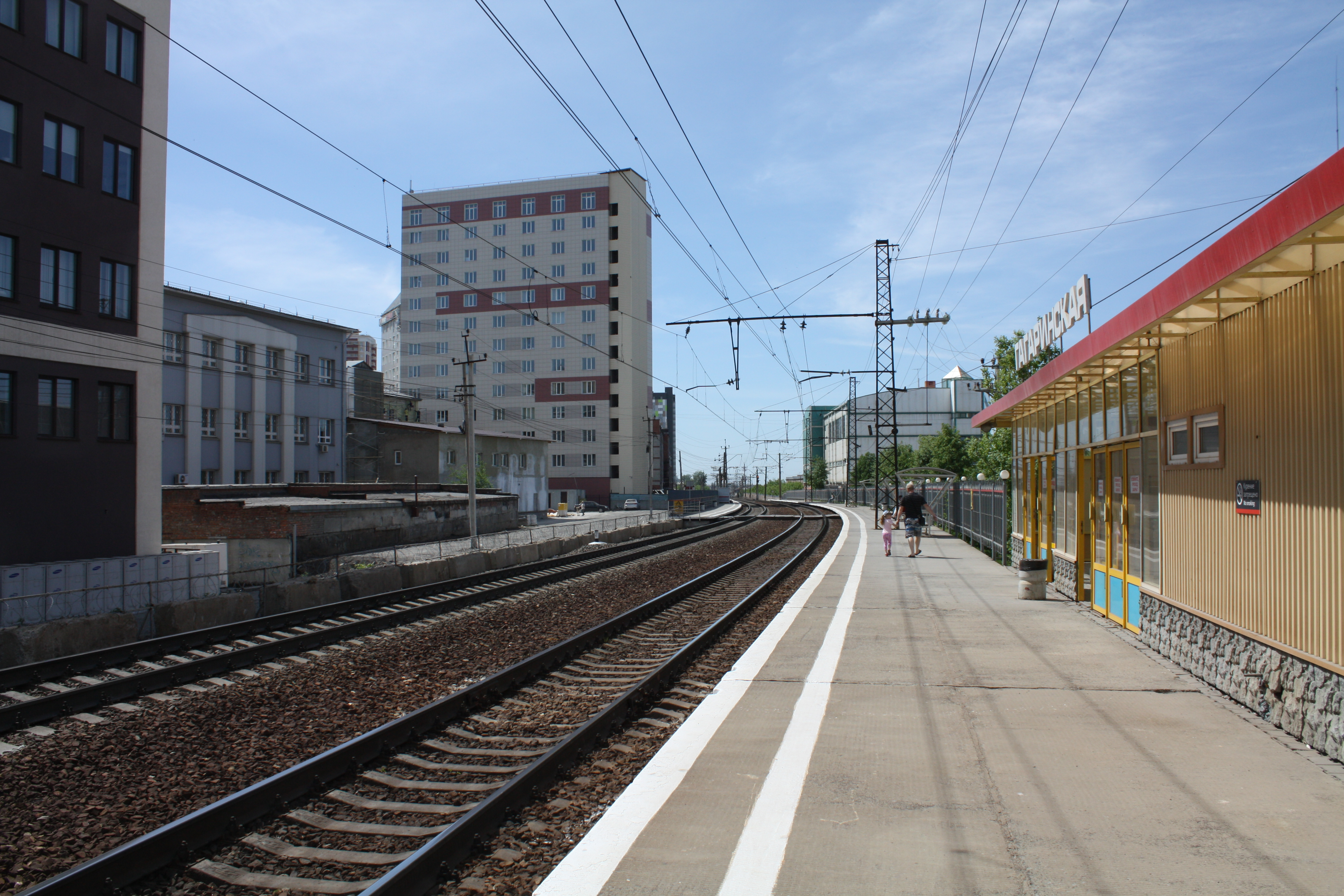
Gagarinskaya Railway Station

=== Metro ===
Two Novosibirsk Metro stations are located in the district: Gagarinskaya and Zayeltsovskaya.

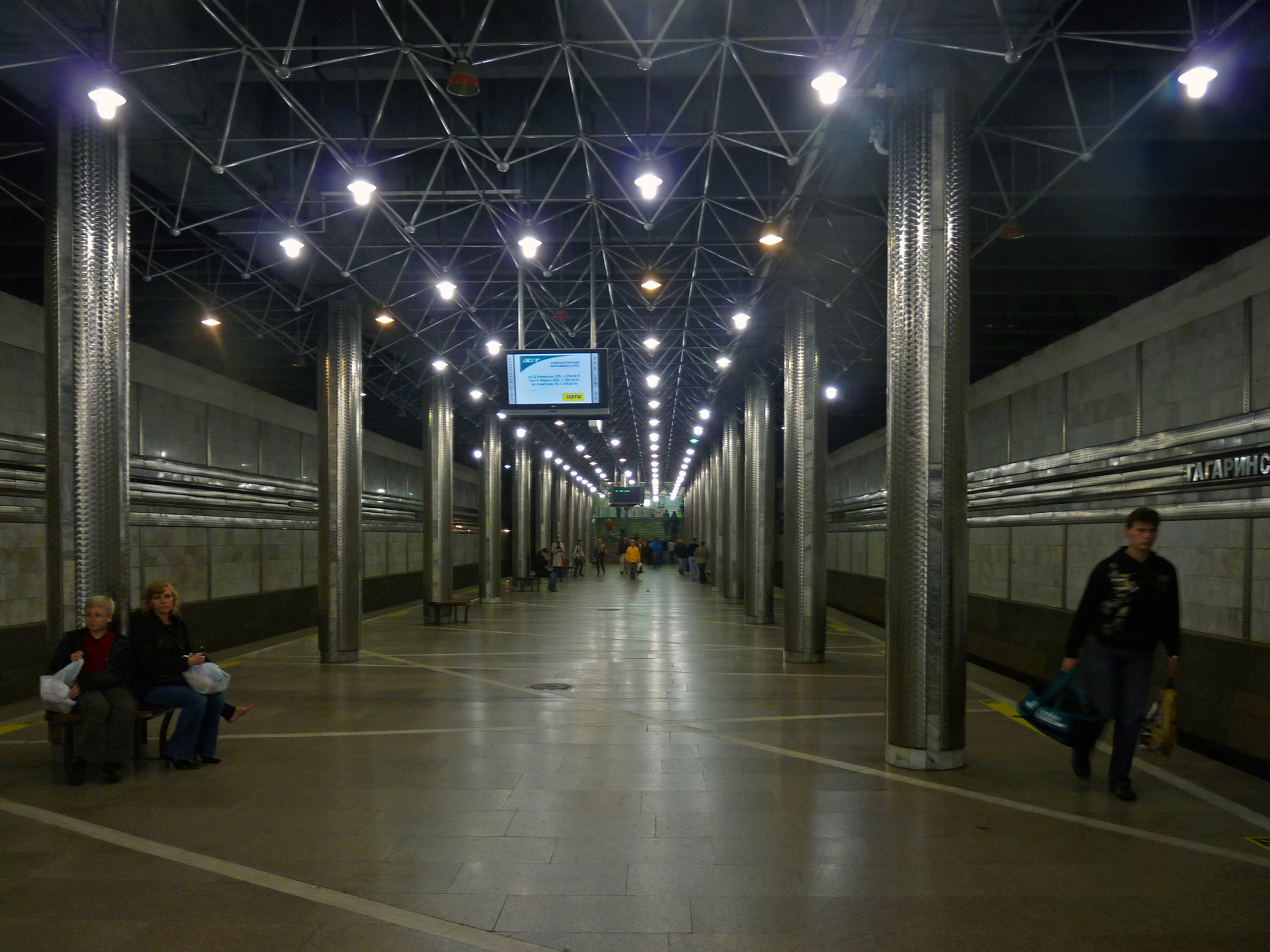
Gagarinskaya Station

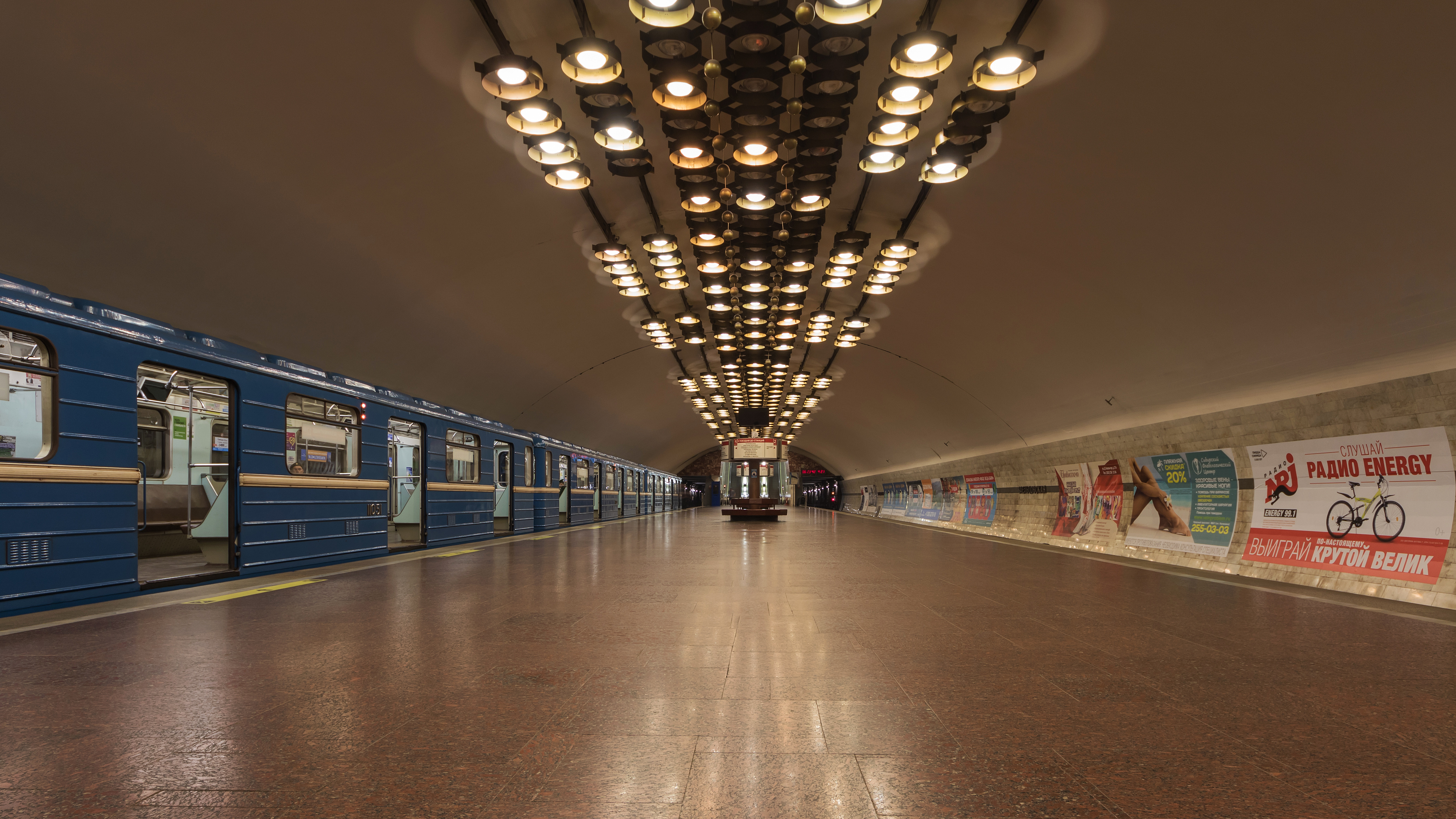
Zayeltsovskaya Station
