= Church of the Holy Martyr Eugene, Novosibirsk =

Russian Orthodox church in Novosibirsk, Russia

Church of the Holy Martyr Eugene Храм Святого мученика Евгения
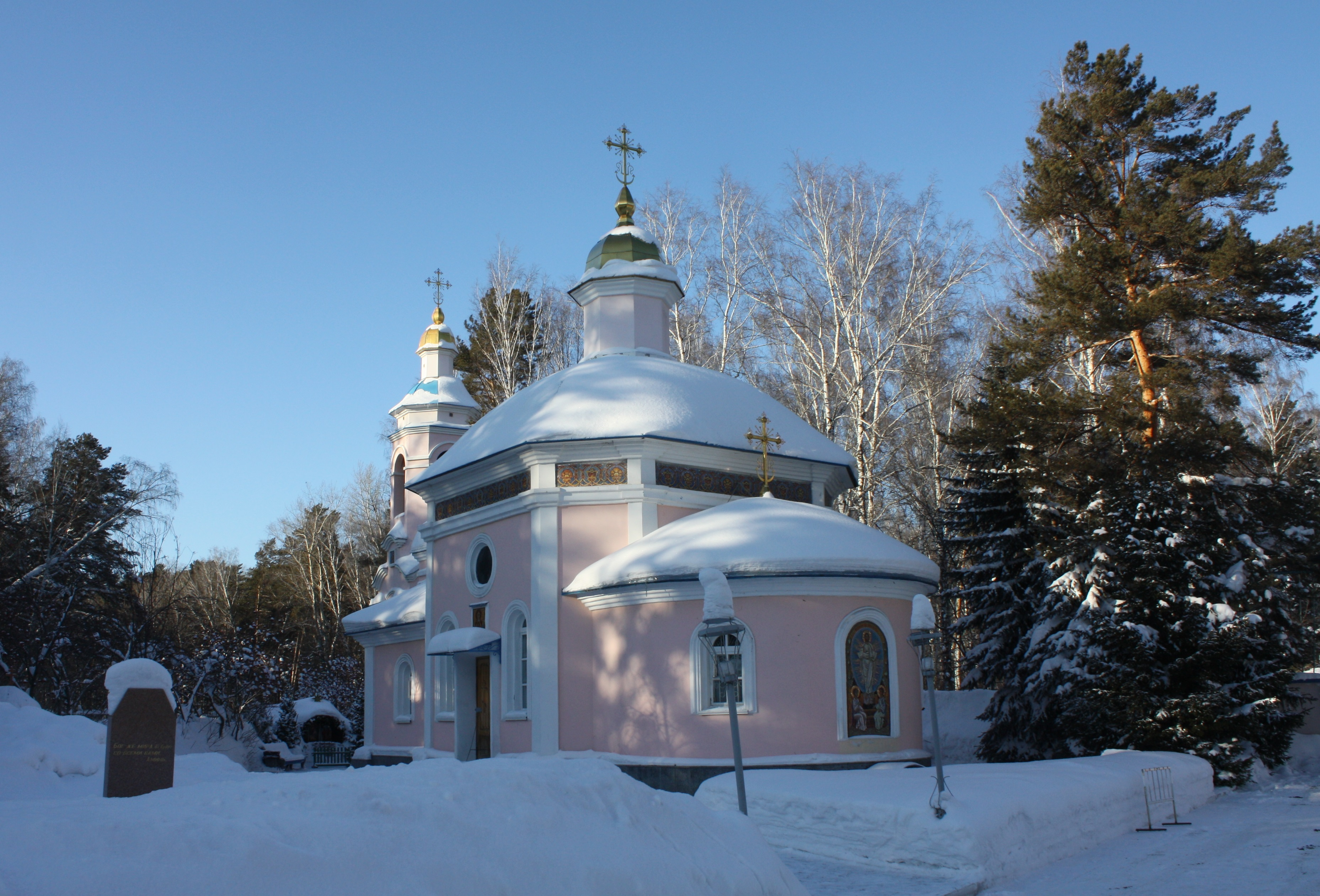

Religion
- Affiliation: Russian Orthodox

Location
- Location: Mochishchenskoye Highway, Novosibirsk
- Interactive map of Church of the Holy Martyr Eugene; Храм Святого мученика Евгения
- Coordinates: 55°05′19″N 82°53′28″E

Architecture
- Completed: 1990s

Church of the Holy Martyr Eugene (Russian: Храм Святого мученика Евгения) is a Russian Orthodox church in Novosibirsk, Russia. It is located near the Zayeltsovskoye Cemetery.

== History ==
In 1993, during the celebration of Easter, the first Divine Liturgy was held in the church.

== Gallery ==
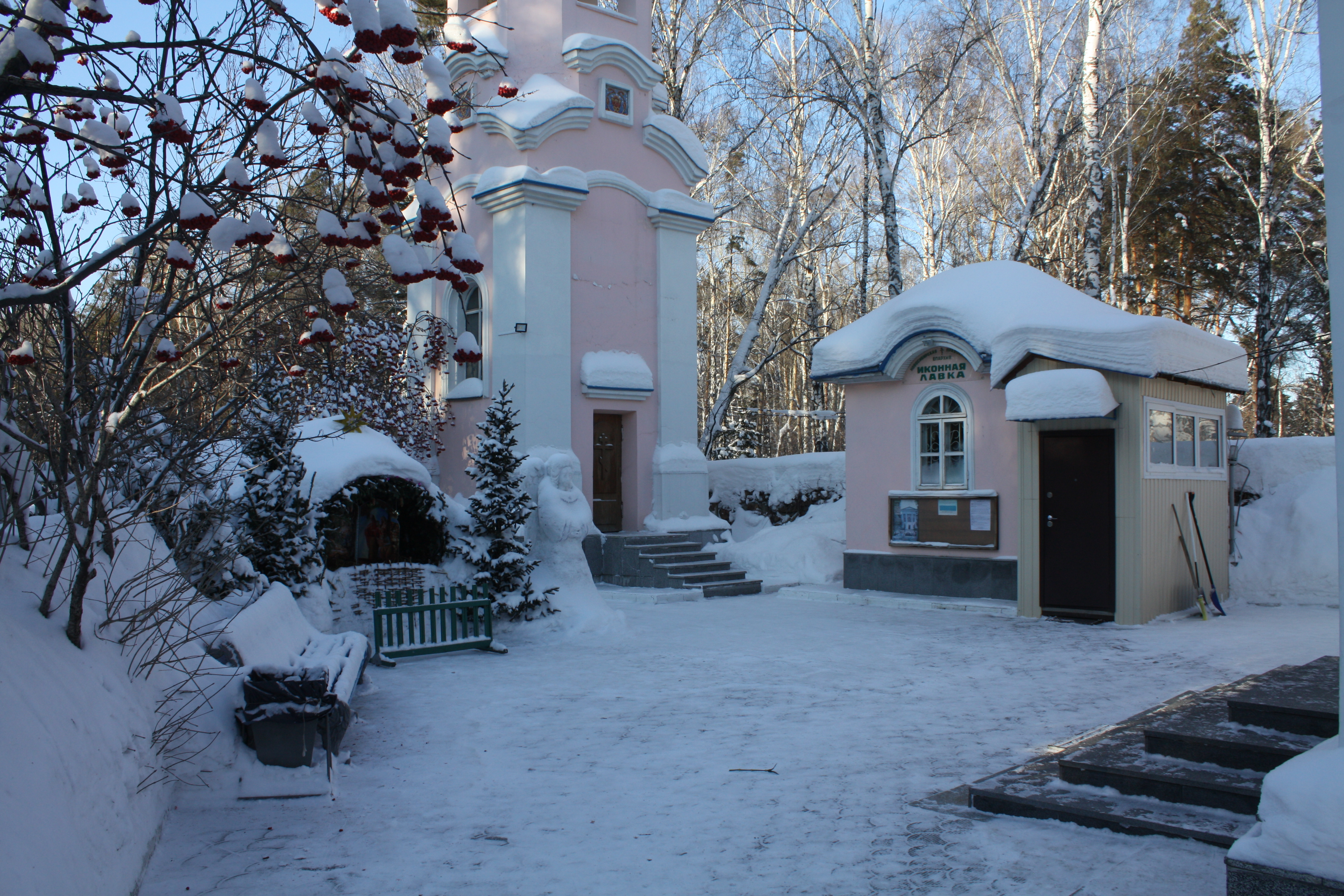

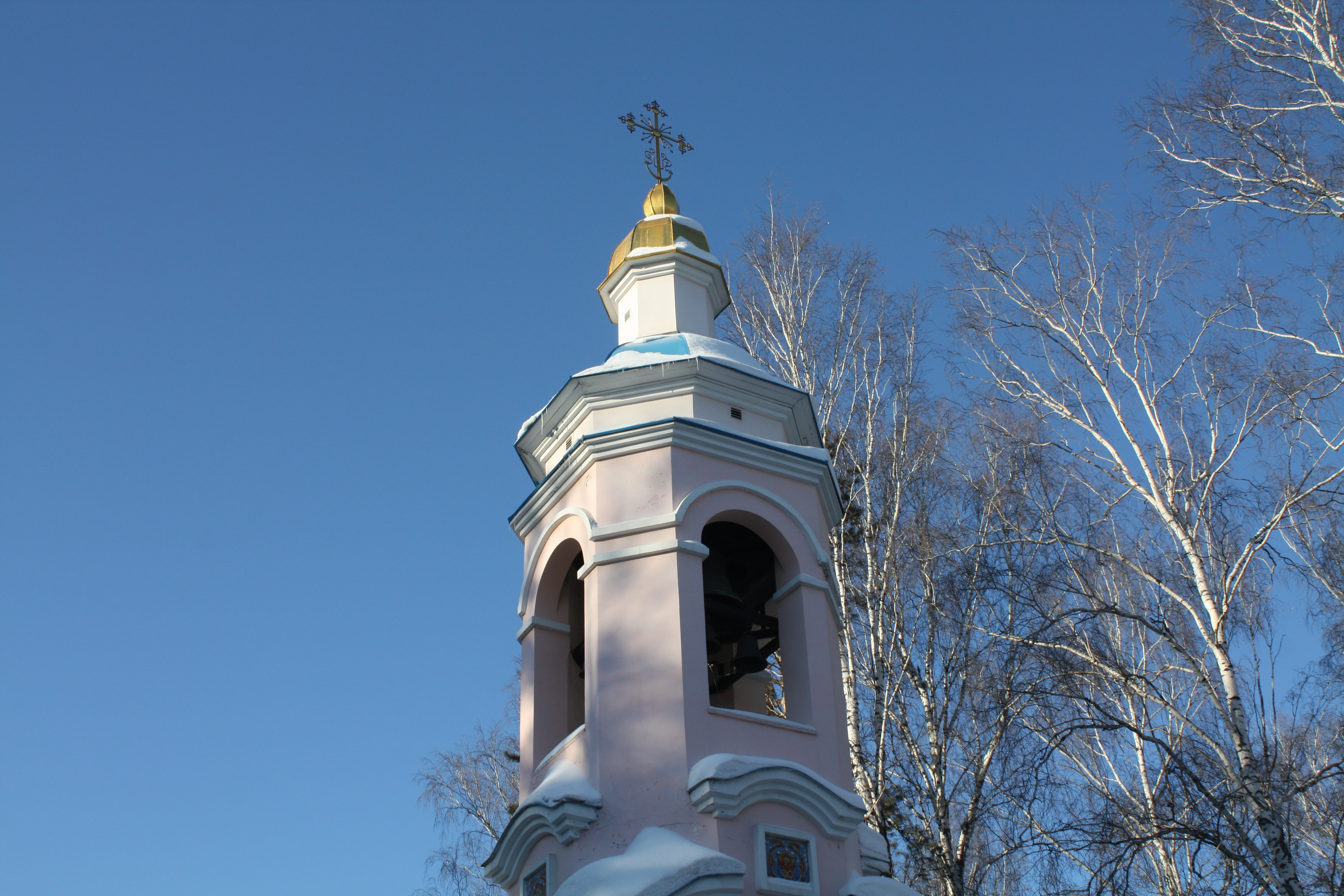

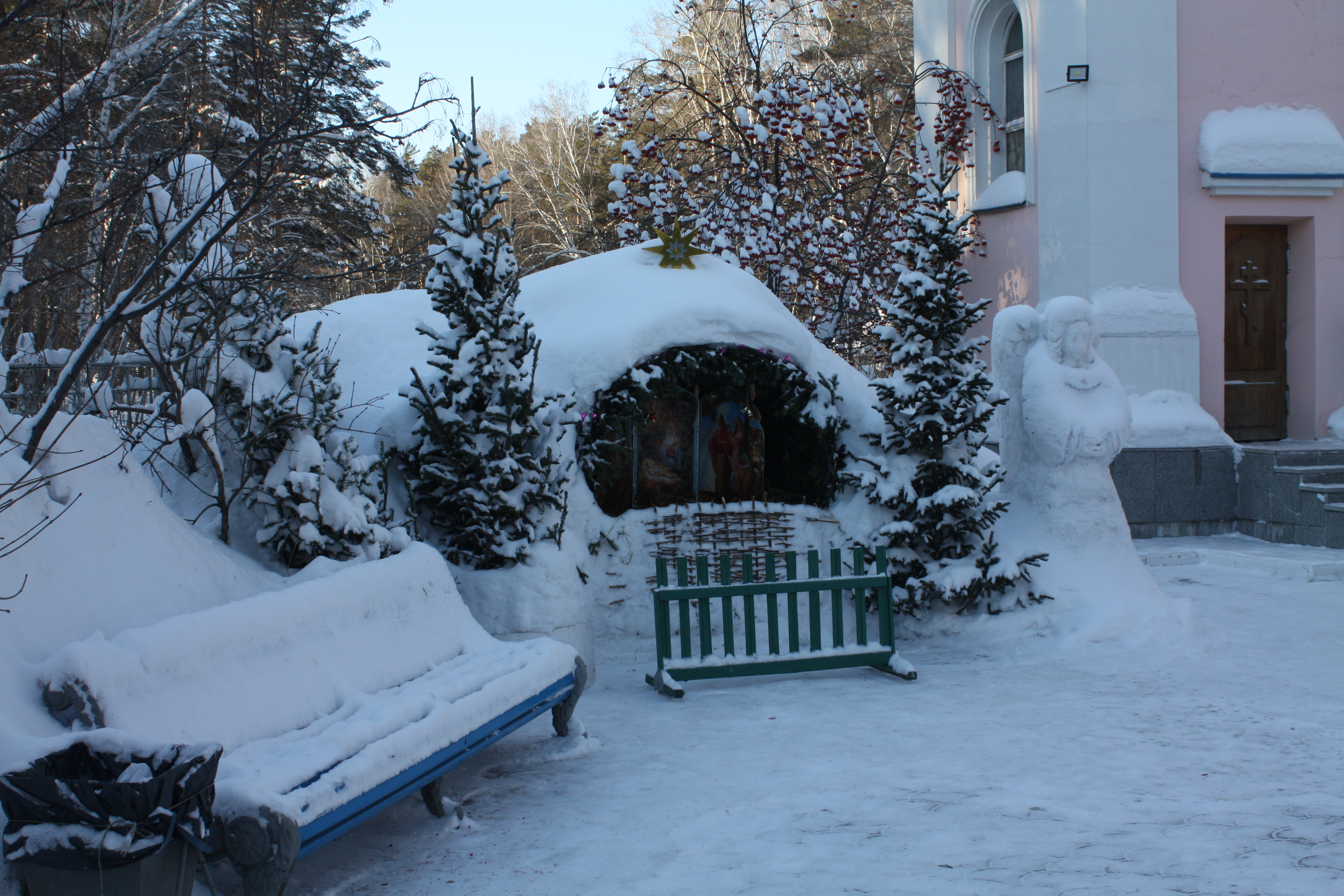

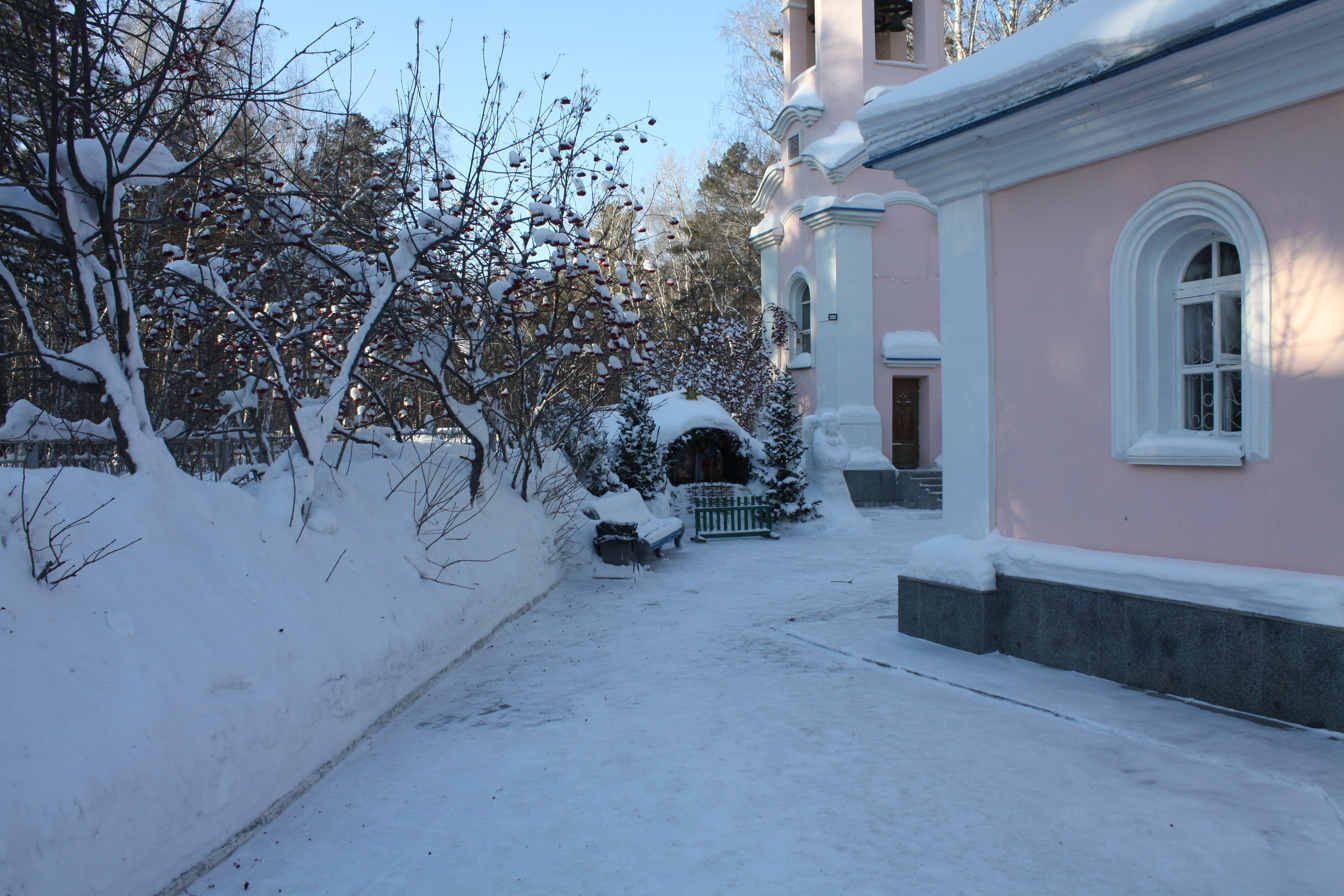

== Burials ==
Archpriest Nikolai Chugainov was buried near the church, thanks to him a new church was built in Belovo and the church was restored in Kolyvan.
