= Church of the Nativity of Mary =

Church of the Nativity of Mary may refer to:

== Belarus ==
- Church of the Nativity of the Blessed Virgin Mary, Muravanka

== Bosnia and Herzegovina ==
- Church of the Nativity of the Theotokos, Mostar
- Church of the Nativity of the Theotokos, Obudovac

== Canada ==
- Headford United Church, also known as Orthodox Church of the Nativity of the Mother of God, Richmond Hill, Ontario

== Croatia ==
- Church of the Nativity of the Theotokos, Drežnica
- Church of the Nativity of the Theotokos, Gaboš
- Church of the Nativity of the Theotokos, Mikluševci
- Church of the Nativity of the Theotokos, Srijemske Laze
- Church of the Nativity of the Blessed Virgin Mary, Zagreb

== Czech Republic ==
- Church of the Nativity of the Blessed Virgin Mary (Písek)
- Church of the Nativity of the Virgin Mary (Prague)

== Greece ==
- Church of the Nativity of the Theotokos Monastery
- Church of the Nativity of the Theotokos, Limni

== Kosovo ==
- Church of the Nativity of the Theotokos, Obiliq

== Malta ==
- Church of Mary's Nativity within the Fort, Birgu
- Parish Church of the Nativity of the Virgin Mary, Mellieħa
- Church of the Nativity of Mary, Naxxar
- Victory Church, Qormi, also known as the Church of the Nativity of Mary
- Church of the Nativity of Our Lady, Rabat
- Basilica of the Nativity of Mary, Senglea
- Church of the Nativity of Our Lady, Victoria, Gozo
- Basilica of the Nativity of Our Lady, Xagħra

== Montenegro ==
- Church of the Nativity of the Theotokos, Zabrđe

== North Macedonia ==
- Church of the Nativity of the Virgin Mary, Bitola
- Church of the Nativity of the Theotokos, Skopje

== Poland ==
- Church of the Nativity of the Blessed Virgin Mary, Głubczyce
- Church of the Nativity of the Blessed Virgin Mary, Mielnik
- Church of the Nativity of the Blessed Virgin Mary, Rogacze
- Church of the Nativity of the Blessed Virgin Mary, Warsaw
- Church of the Nativity of the Blessed Virgin Mary, Włodawa

== Romania ==
- Church of the Nativity of the Theotokos, Focșani
- Church of the Nativity of the Theotokos, Iosefin
- Church of the Nativity of the Theotokos, Zabrđe
- Church of the Nativity of the Theotokos, Zărnești

== Russia ==
- Church of the Nativity of the Blessed Virgin Mary (Konygin)
- Nativity Church in the Kremlin, Moscow
- Nativity Church at Putinki, Moscow
- Church of the Nativity of the Virgin (Raskildino)
- Rostov-on-Don Cathedral
- Church of the Nativity of the Theotokos, Antoniev Monastery, near Veliky Novgorod
- Church of the Nativity of the Theotokos on Mikhalitsa, Veliky Novgorod
- Church of the Nativity of the Theotokos, Peryn, near Veliky Novgorod
- Church of the Nativity of the Theotokos, Viazivka

== Serbia ==
- Church of the Nativity of the Blessed Virgin Mary, Bačka Palanka
- Church of the Nativity of the Virgin, Bogatić
- Church of the Nativity of the Theotokos, Novaci
- Church of the Nativity of the Theotokos, Obilić
- Church of the Nativity of the Theotokos, Sremska Kamenica

== Singapore ==
- Church of the Nativity of the Blessed Virgin Mary, Singapore

== Slovakia ==
- Church of the Nativity of the Blessed Virgin Mary, Michalovce

== Spain ==
- Church of la Natividad de Nuestra Señora (San Martín de la Vega)
- Church of la Natividad de Nuestra Señora, Valdetorres de Jarama

== Ukraine ==
- Church of the Nativity of the Blessed Virgin Mary (Chernihiv)
- Church of the Nativity of the Virgin Mary, Hadynkivtsi
- Church of the Nativity of the Theotokos, Kryvorivnia
- Church of the Nativity of the Theotokos, Kryvyi Rih
- Church of the Nativity of the Theotokos, Sambir
- Church of the Nativity of the Theotokos (Mariupol)

== United Kingdom ==
- Church of the Nativity of the Blessed Virgin Mary, Lympstone, Devon, England
- Cathedral of the Nativity of the Most Holy Mother of God and the Holy Royal Martyrs, Chiswick, London, England

== United States ==
- Church of the Nativity of the Theotokos, Afognak, Alaska
- Nativity of the Blessed Virgin Mary Catholic Church, Cassella, Ohio
- Nativity of Mary, Blessed Virgin Catholic Church, High Hill, Texas

== See also ==
- Nativity of the Virgin (disambiguation)
- Cathedral of the Nativity of the Theotokos (disambiguation)
- Cathedral of the Nativity of the Blessed Virgin Mary (disambiguation)
- Church of the Nativity of the Theotokos (disambiguation)
- Church of the Nativity (disambiguation)
- Church of the Dormition of the Theotokos (disambiguation)
