= Nativity of the Virgin =

Nativity of the Virgin may refer to:

- Nativity of Mary, birthday of the Blessed Virgin Mary

== Paintings ==
- Nativity of the Virgin (Altdorfer), c. 1520
- Nativity of the Virgin (Beccafumi), c. 1540–1543
- Nativity of the Virgin (del Sarto), 1513–1514
- Nativity of the Virgin (Francesco Albani), c. 1598
- Nativity of the Virgin (Master of the Osservanza Triptych), c. 1430–1433
- Nativity of the Virgin (Perugino), c. 1472
- Nativity of the Virgin (Pietro Lorenzetti), c. 1335–1342
- Nativity of the Virgin (Upper Rhenish Master), c. 1430

== See also ==
- Church of the Nativity of Mary (disambiguation)
