= Church of the Nativity of the Theotokos, Obudovac =

Church of the Nativity of the Theotokos
- Храм рођења пресвете Богородице
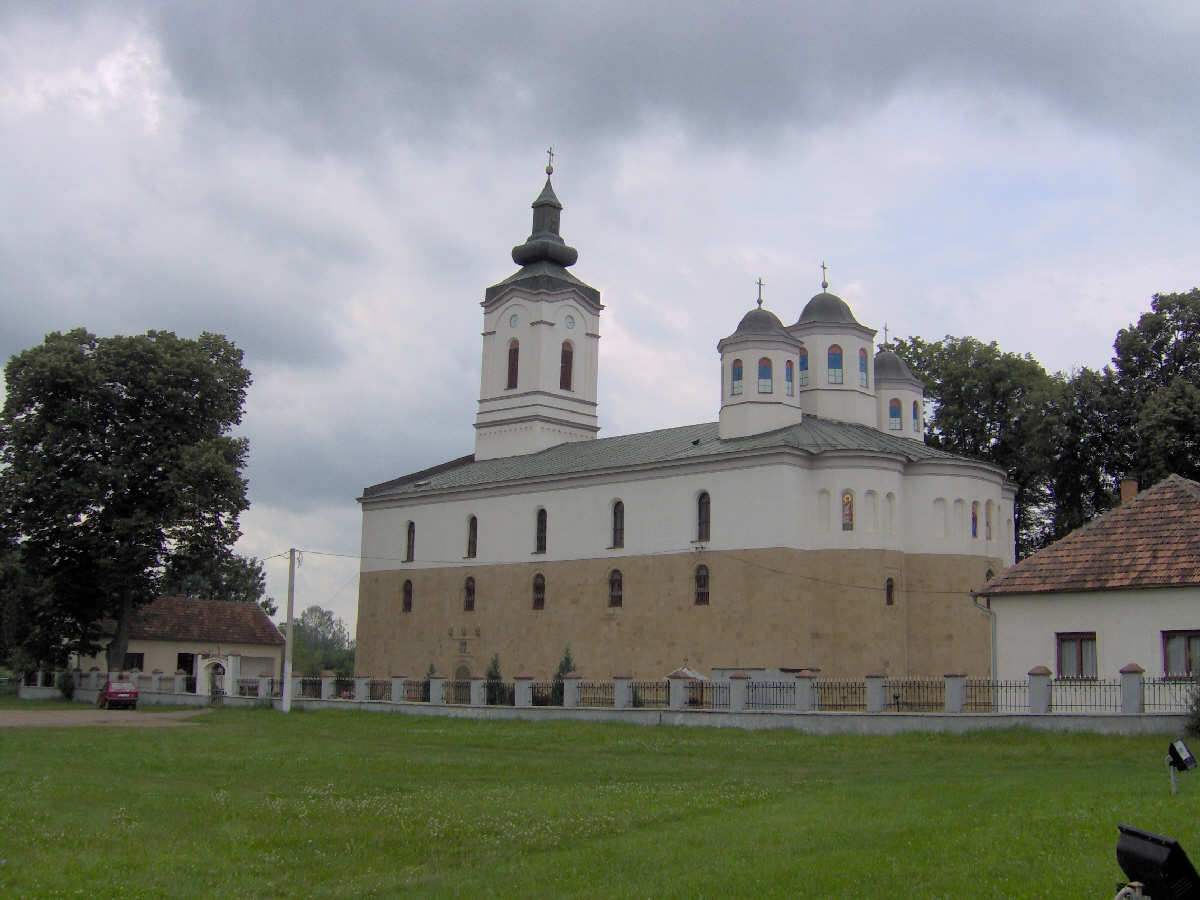
- Church of the Nativity of the Theotokos
- Church of the Nativity of the Theotokos
- 44.9691°N 18.6000°E
- Location: Obudovac, Bosnia and Herzegovina
- Country: Bosnia and Herzegovina
- Denomination: Serbian Orthodox

History
- Status: Church
- Dedication: Nativity of the Theotokos
- Consecrated: October 14, 1882; 143 years ago

Architecture
- Functional status: Active
- Years built: 1864–1882

Administration
- Archdiocese: Eparchy of Zvornik and Tuzla

Church of the Nativity of the Theotokos, Obudovac (Serbian Cyrillic: Црква рођења пресвете Богородице) is the largest village Serbian Orthodox Church in Bosnia. The temple was built under the leadership of Metropolitan Dionysius I of Zvornik and Tuzla Eparchy. The temple in Obudovac was damaged many times, but thanks to people of the village it was always repaired. The roof of this church was covered with copper in 1891.

== History ==
The church began to be built in 1864 and was completed in 1882. It was built on a plot of land that had served only as a church building and cemetery for the last three hundred years. The church was built in a mixture of Serbian-Byzantine and Baroque styles.

== Architecture ==
The highest tower with a cross reaches a height of 46 meters, the length of the church is 27 meters and the width is 22 meters. The church is made of stone called sig (the lower part) and brick (the upper part). The stone used for construction was brought from the Opeža mine near Modriča and the mine near Bijela. The main person in charge of construction was the protomaster Tasa from Ohrid, with his fifty craftsmen. The church was constructed by the pashas and viziers of the Ottoman Empire. Eighteen surrounding villages helped with the construction and brought in building materials.

The church houses a huge iconostasis 19.5 meters high. It was made by the famous artist Roman Petrović from Sarajevo. The iconostasis has 24 icons and all the figures are painted in life-size. The large altar houses three bells that weigh more than two tons.
