= Church of the Nativity of the Blessed Virgin Mary, Chernihiv =

Church in Chernihiv Oblast, Ukraine

Church of the Nativity of the Blessed Virgin Mary
- Храм Різдва Пресвятої Богородиці
- Church of the Nativity of the Blessed Virgin Mary
- 51°29′48″N 31°16′29″E
- Location: Vyacheslav Chornovola Street, 45, Chernihiv, Chernihiv Oblast, 14030
- Country: Ukraine
- Denomination: Eastern Orthodox Church

History
- Status: Chapel
- Consecrated: 2014

Architecture
- Functional status: Active
- Architectural type: Church
- Years built: 3
- Groundbreaking: 2011

Administration
- Diocese: Chernihiv UGCC

The Church of the Nativity of the Blessed Virgin Mary (Ukrainian: Храм Різдва Пресвятої Богородиці) is a Ukrainian Greek Catholic church in Chernihiv. The church is located on the territory of the convent of the Redemptorist Sisters (Missionaries of the Most Holy Redeemer) at 45 Viacheslav Chornovola Street.

== History ==
On November 17, 2010, the Missionary Sisters of the Most Holy Redeemer (Redemptorists) arrived in Chernihiv. Construction of the monastery began in the fall of 2011. In April 2012, Bishop Josyf Milyan, Auxiliary Bishop of the Kyiv Archeparchy, consecrated the foundation and cornerstone of the church.

The consecration of the church and monastery took place on April 24, 2014. The ceremony was performed by the Head of the UGCC, His Beatitude Sviatoslav Shevchuk. In October 2015, Bishop Yosyf Milyan, Auxiliary Bishop of the Kyiv Archeparchy, consecrated the iconostasis of the temple.

The icons are painted in the classical style of the Eastern Rite, using materials of natural origin in the four-color technique.

== Gallery ==
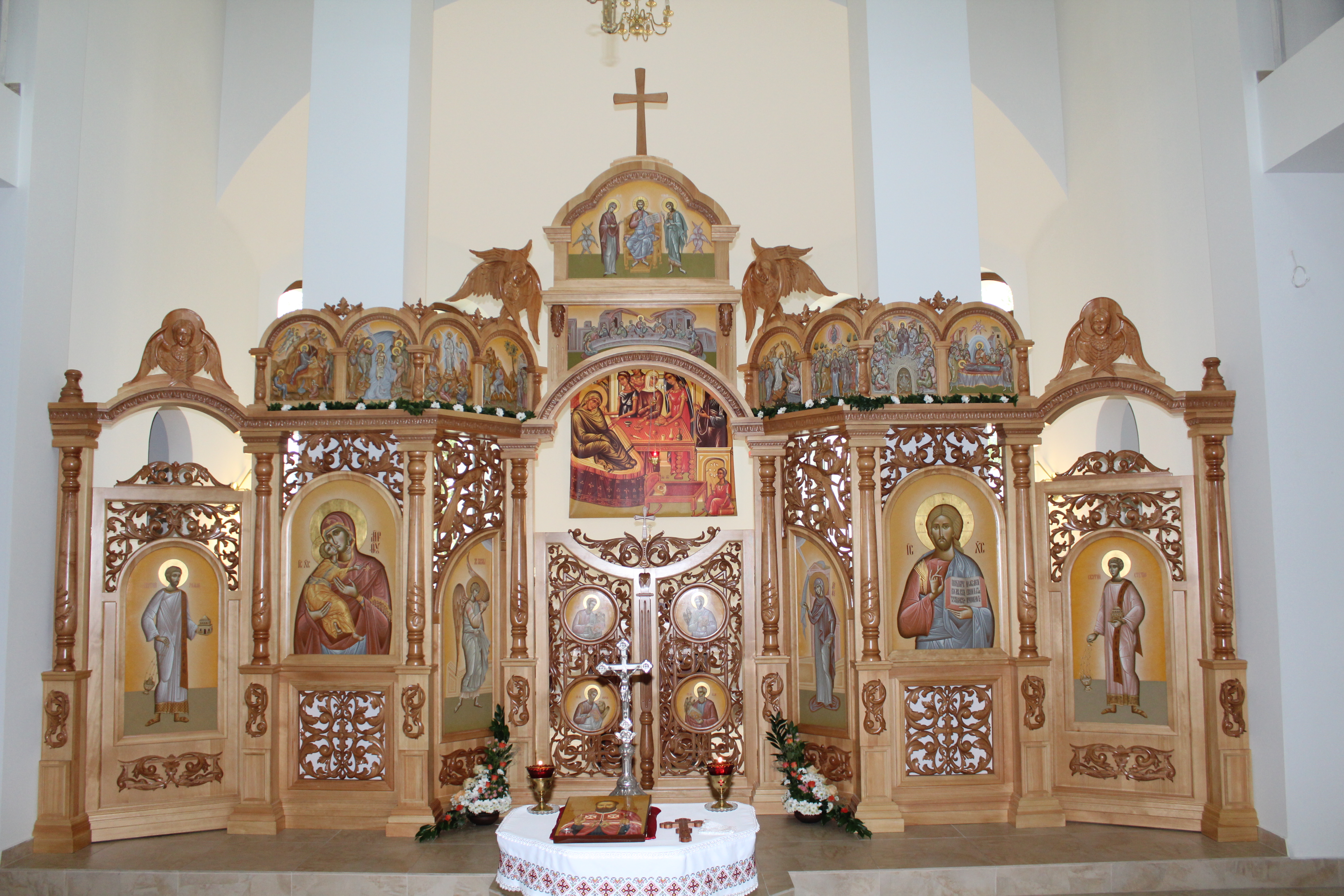
Iconostasis of the Church of the Nativity of the Blessed Virgin Mary (Chernihiv)

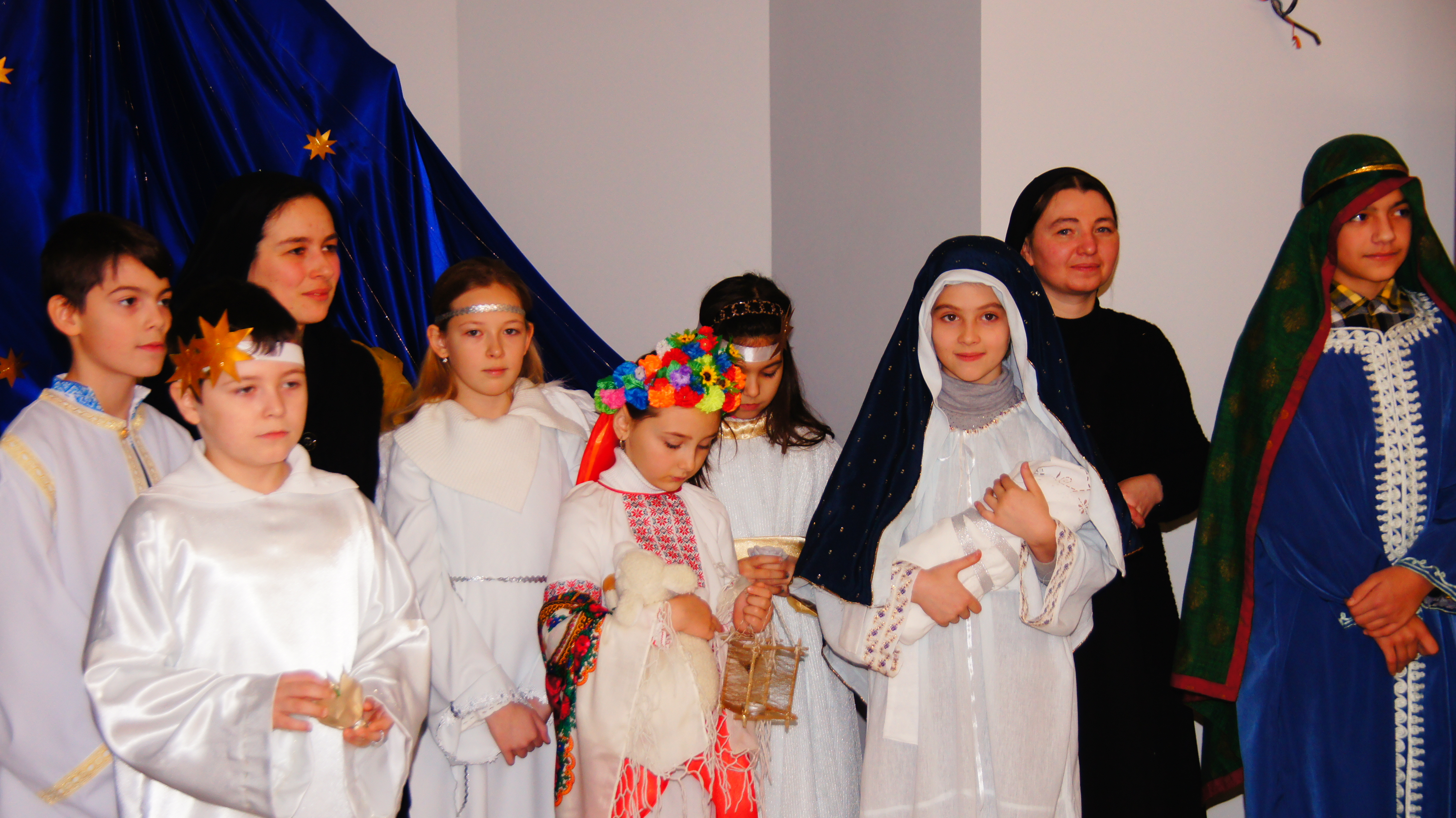
Sunday school students

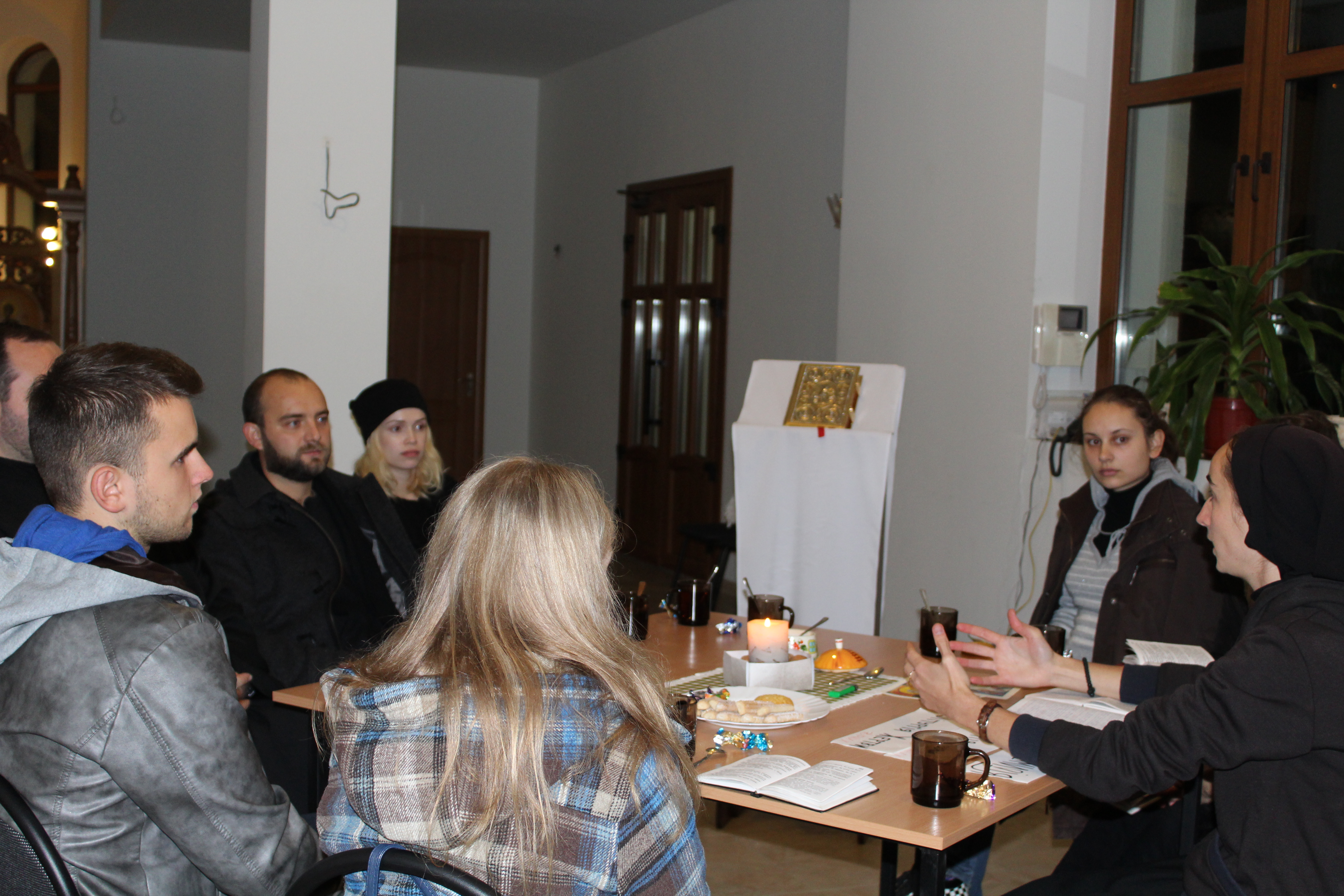
Youth meetings

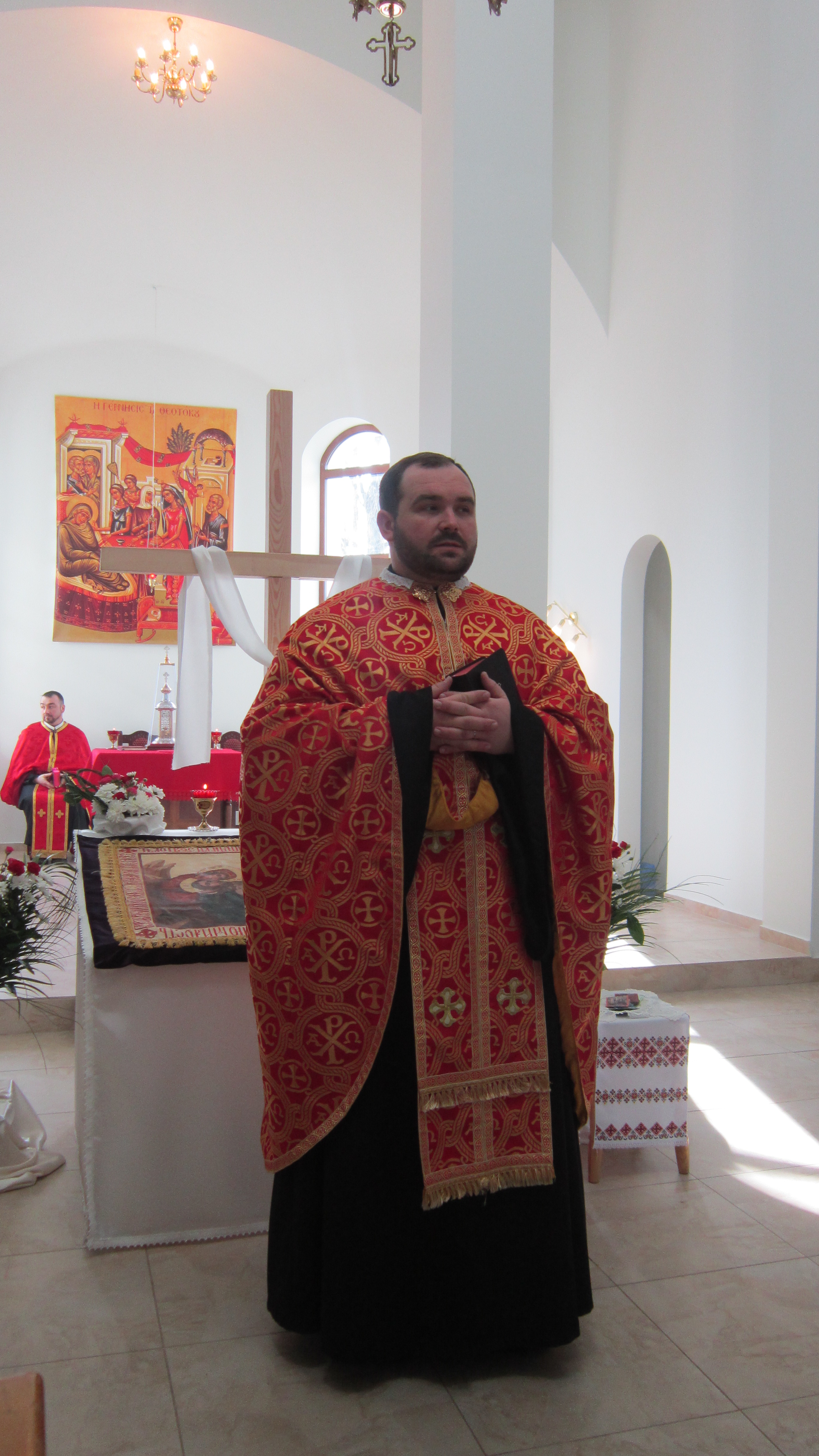
Father Petro Loza, Redemptorist

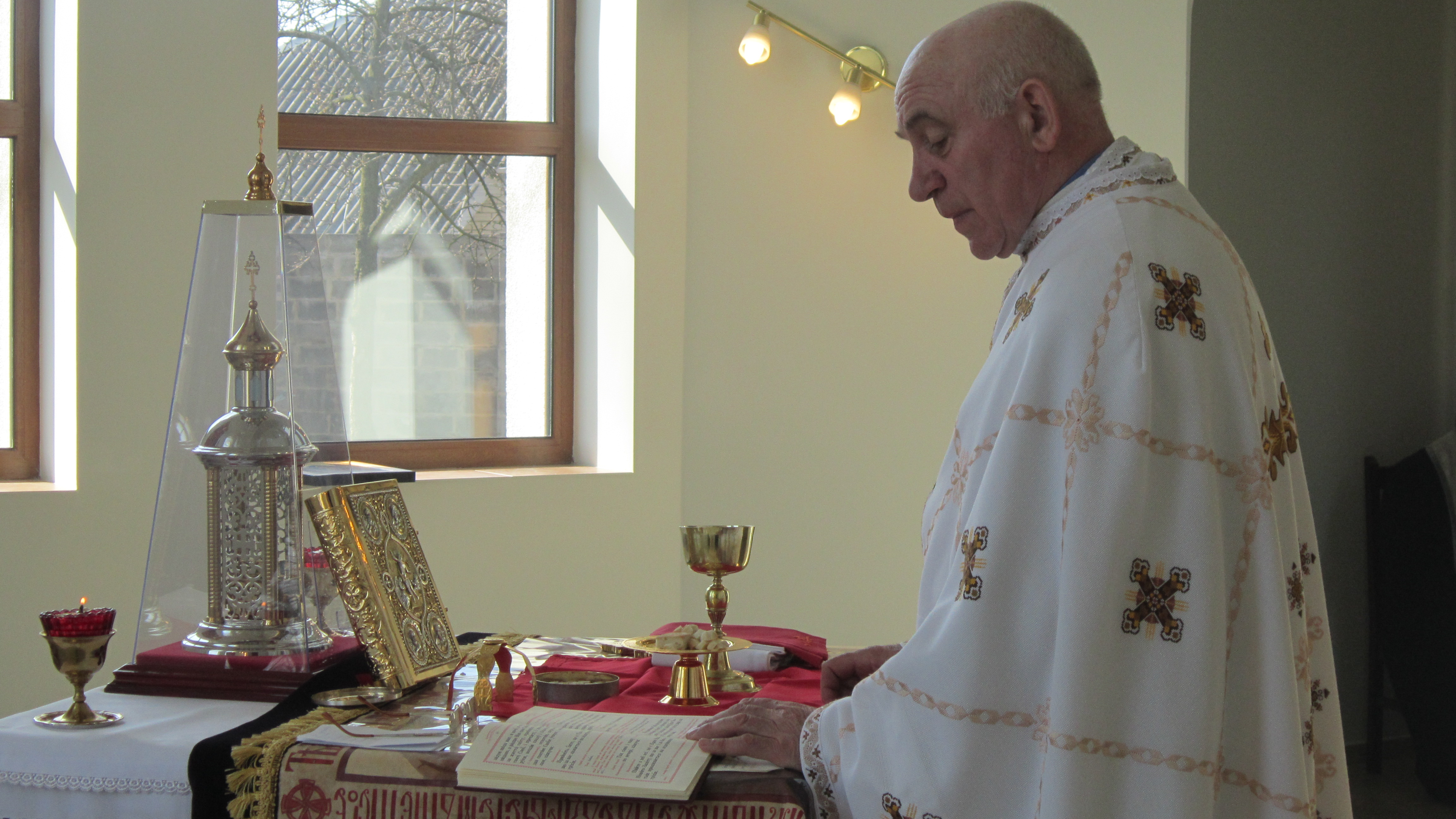
Father Igor Spodar, Redemptorist

== See also ==
- List of Churches and Monasteries in Chernihiv
- Church of the Nativity of Mary
