= Church of the Nativity of the Blessed Virgin Mary, Zagreb =

Church of the Nativity of the Blessed Virgin Mary (Croatian: Župna crkva Rođenja Blažene Djevice Marije)
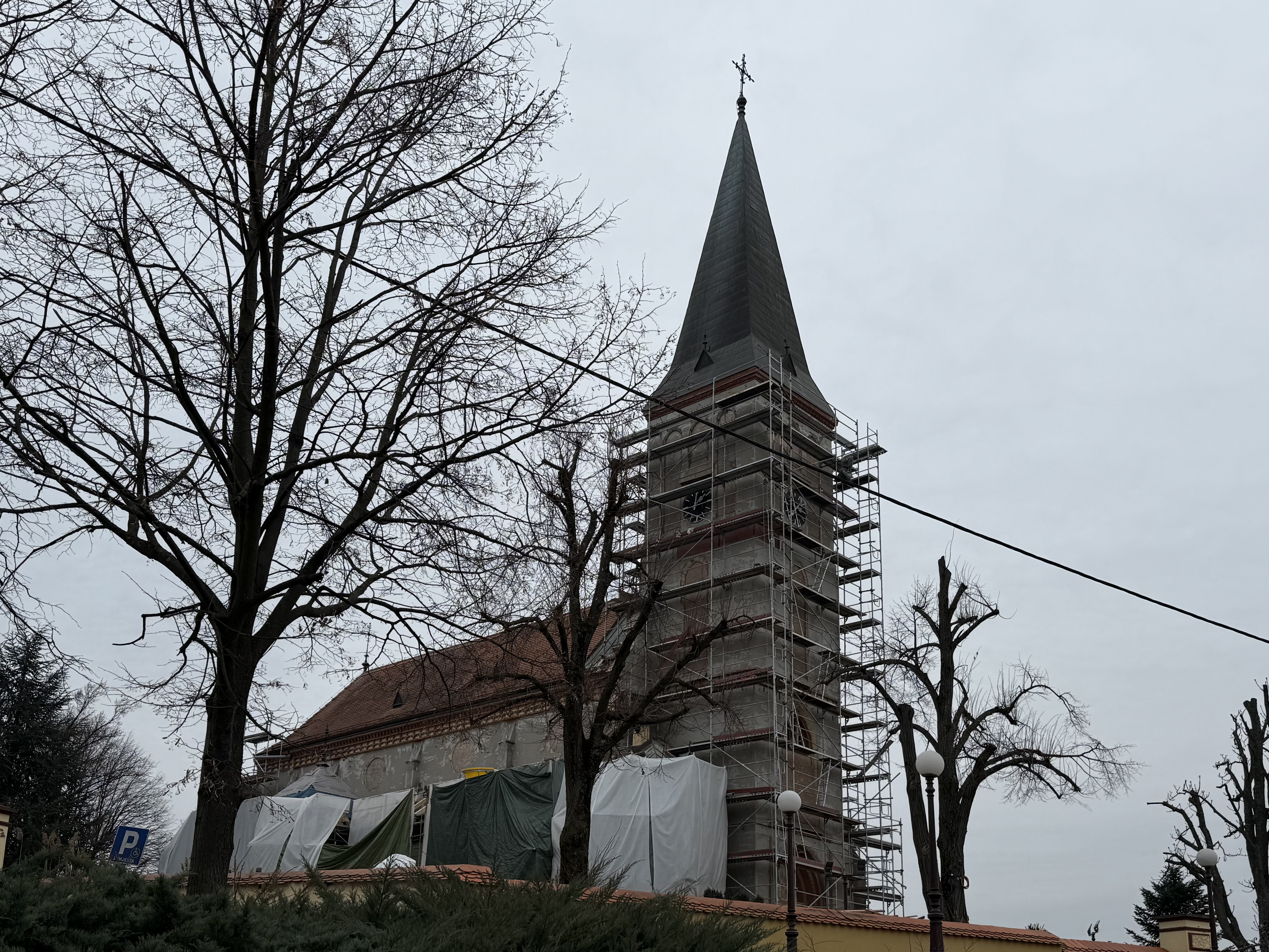
- View of the church
- Church of the Nativity of the Blessed Virgin Mary (Croatian: Župna crkva Rođenja Blažene Djevice Marije)
- 45°50′54″N 16°03′16″E
- Location: Zagreb
- Country: Croatia
- Denomination: Roman Catholic

Architecture
- Functional status: Active
- Heritage designation: protected cultural property
- Architect: Hermann Bollé
- Architectural type: neogothic
- Completed: 1886

Church of the Nativity of the Blessed Virgin Mary, Zagreb (Croatian: Župna crkva Rođenja Blažene Djevice Marije u Granešini) is a Catholic parish church located in the neighbourhood Granešina of Zagreb, Croatia.

== History ==
It was built in 1886 on the site of a church that had existed since the Middle Ages. The old Gothic church, which was damaged in the earthquakes of 1502 and 1690, was rebuilt in the Baroque style in the early 18th century. After that church was damaged in the earthquake of 1880, the current church was built.

== Architecture ==
The parish church in Granešina is one of the architectural works of Hermann Bollé.

The neogothic church with a bell tower was built according to Bollé's designs, as part of the reconstruction after the earthquake of 1880. The church was consecrated on 13 October 1901, and was performed by Archbishop Josip Posilović. A historical document from 1502 mentions an earlier church that was destroyed in an earthquake, while the new church also suffered significant damage in the 1906 earthquake and during the fighting for Zagreb in World War II, on 7 May 1945. Renovations were carried out in 1976 (interior), 1991 (tower and roof), and 1996 (staircase, Stations of the Cross, and garden). The church is protected as a cultural and historical monument.

The construction of Bollé's new church cost 23,600 forints, of which the Archbishop's Spiritual Office gave 16,600, and 7,000 were collected by parishioners. The equipment worth 4,486 forints was financed by the parish with 3,655, and the parish priest added 313 forints. The rest was financed by the collected debts of the peasants and the sale of mass wine.

=== Interior ===
The interior of the church is characterized by ribbed vaults and a wooden roof above the main nave.

Before the demolition of the old church, all the preserved objects were put away, but since, according to Bollé's idea, they were not appropriate for the newly built church, the parish priest Mikec tried to sell them. The sale failed and the parish priest asked the Archbishop's Spiritual Office to burn and write off the objects. All that remains is the statue of the Blessed Virgin Mary and Child, according to some estimates from the 15th century, and according to others from the 17th century, which was on the main altar. It is a rare and high-quality example of late Gothic sculpture, 1 meter high. It is placed on the wall of the sanctuary in front of the main altar, which also houses the statues of the Virgin Mary, St. Peter and St. Paul.

The church is decorated with stained glass windows, ornamental decorations, and artistic depictions of Blessed Alojzije Stepinac, the Blessed Drina Martyrs, Blessed Ivan Merz, Blessed Augustin Kažotić, Saint Nikola Tavelić, Saint Leopold Mandić, and Saint Edith Stein.

== Gallery ==
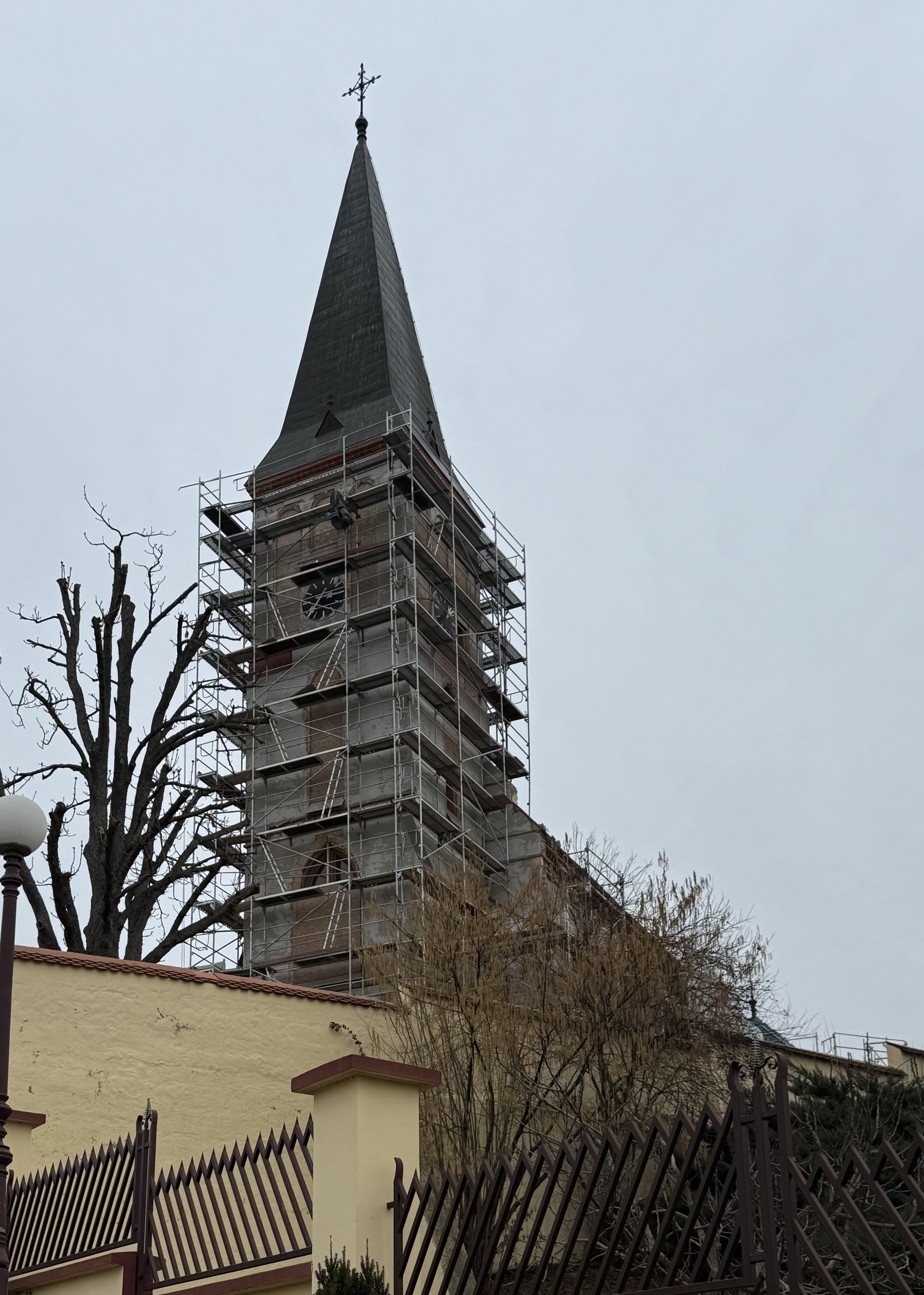
View of the church (February 2025)

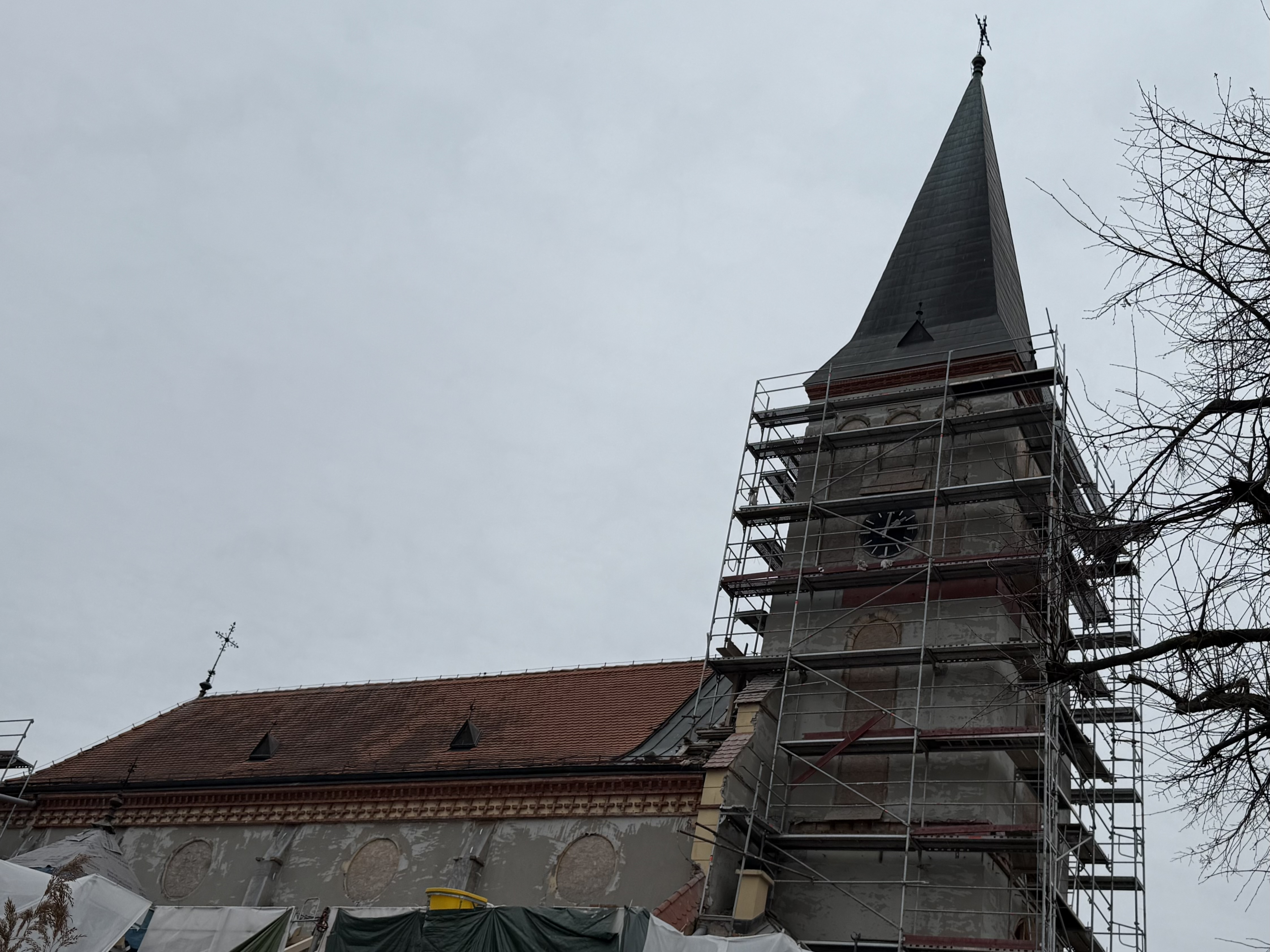
Bell tower under scaffolding

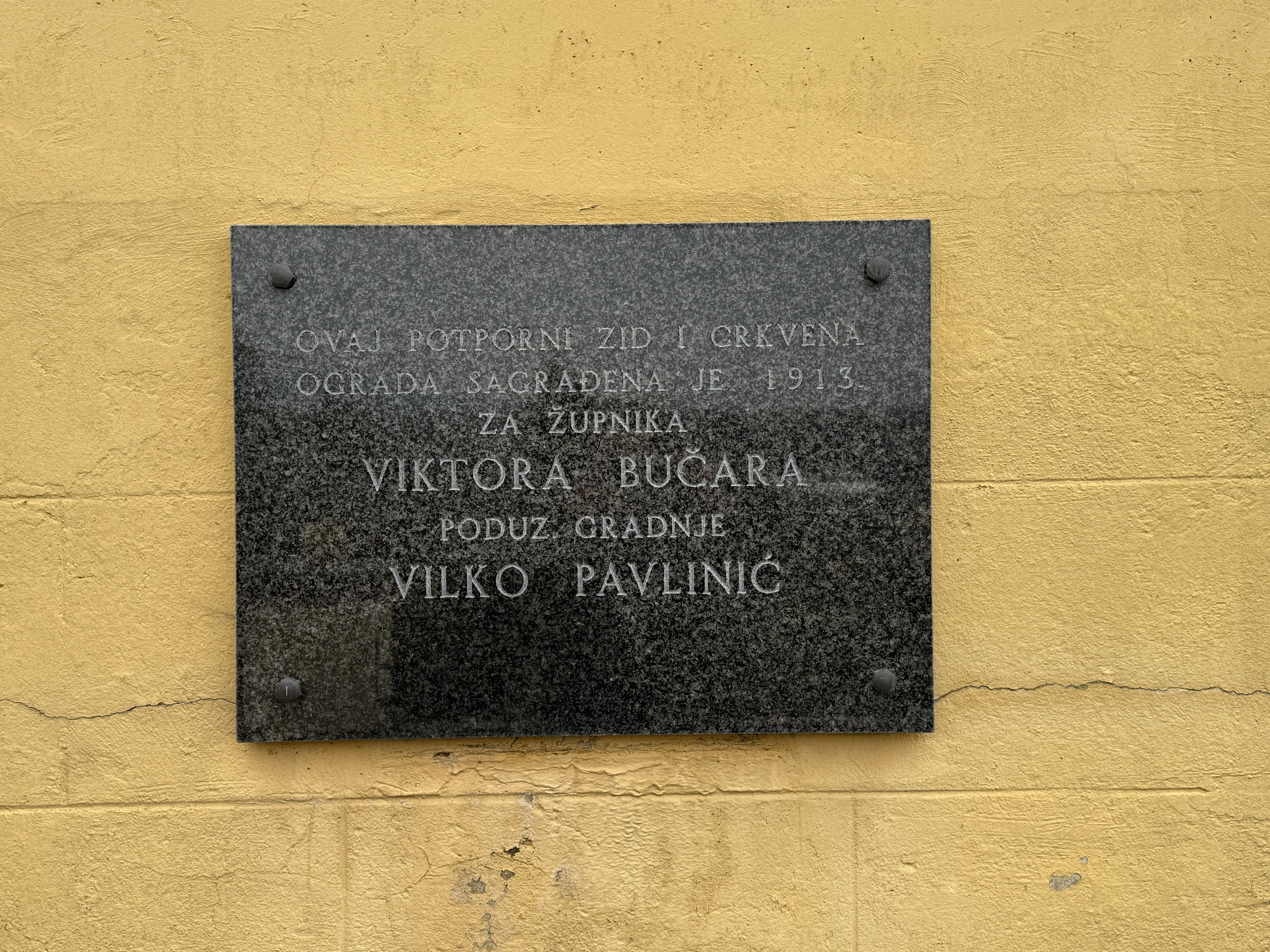
Slab on retaining wall
