= Church of the Nativity of the Blessed Virgin Mary, Michalovce =

Latin Catholic cathedral in Slovakia

Rímskokatolícky farský kostol Narodenia Panny Márie
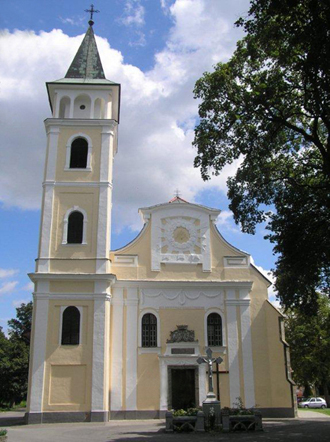

Religion
- Affiliation: Catholic Church (Latin Church)
- Province: Archdiocese of Košice
- Region: Kosice
- Ecclesiastical or organisational status: Church
- Leadership: Bernard Bober
- Status: Active

Location
- Location: Farská 3, 071 01 Michalovce, Slovakia
- State: Slovakia
- Interactive map of Rímskokatolícky farský kostol Narodenia Panny Márie
- Coordinates: 48.7575°N 21.9264°E

Architecture
- Type: Church
- Style: Baroque
- Groundbreaking: 13th century
- Completed: late 13th century

Specifications
- Direction of façade: West
- Spire: one
- Spire height: 90 metres (300 ft)

Website
- michalovce.rimkat.sk/farsky_kostol.html

Church of the Nativity of the Blessed Virgin Mary (Slovak: Rímskokatolícky farský kostol Narodenia Panny Márie) is a historic Marian cathedral of the Catholic Church in the old square in the city of Michalovce in the Kosice Region in eastern Slovakia. Finished in the late 13th century it is the oldest church in Michalovce. Originally designed as a Gothic church, it was restored in the 18th century to Baroque style. It is widely considered to be one of Slovakia's finest examples of medieval church architecture and among the most well-known church buildings in the country and is considered a national landmark in Slovakia.

== History ==
The church, dedicated to the Virgin Mary (who was also the patron saint of Hungarian kings), was constructed in the late 13th century for the lords of Michalovce (Nagymihályiovci). The church was located in what was then the town center, and then obviously stood in the middle of the square. By the 14th century the church was located near the church parish school (written mention of it is among the oldest records of the parish schools throughout Slovakia). From the 16th to 18th centuries the church changed hands several times (alternately belonging to Protestants and Catholics).

At the end of 17th century it was severely damaged by fire. In the 18th century it was restored by initiative and the patronage of the Hungarian Count Imre Sztáray. What was originally a gothic church now obtained Baroque architecture. To this day the Gothic church bell tower remains, and the Church has maintained a Gothic-styled interior.

Other sights include an epitaph of an unknown Hungarian aristocrat, as well as a baroque altar dating from 1721 with a younger altarpiece of the Virgin Mary (the original was transferred to the Jesuit church in nearby Uzhhorod), a plaque (to commemorate the restoration of the church) in 1749, Rococo pulpit from the 19th century. Above the main entrance to the church is placed a plaque with an inscription from 1784. Curiosity is nowadays aroused by the local crypt, where the members of the families of patrons of the church is buried along with 18th-century weapons that were allegedly concealed in the bowels of the church by conspirators against the king.

== See also ==
- Roman Catholic Marian churches
- Michalovce
- Roman Catholicism in Slovakia
