= Church of la Natividad de Nuestra Señora (San Martín de la Vega) =

Church in Community of Madrid, Spain

- Iglesia de la Natividad de Nuestra Señora (Spanish)
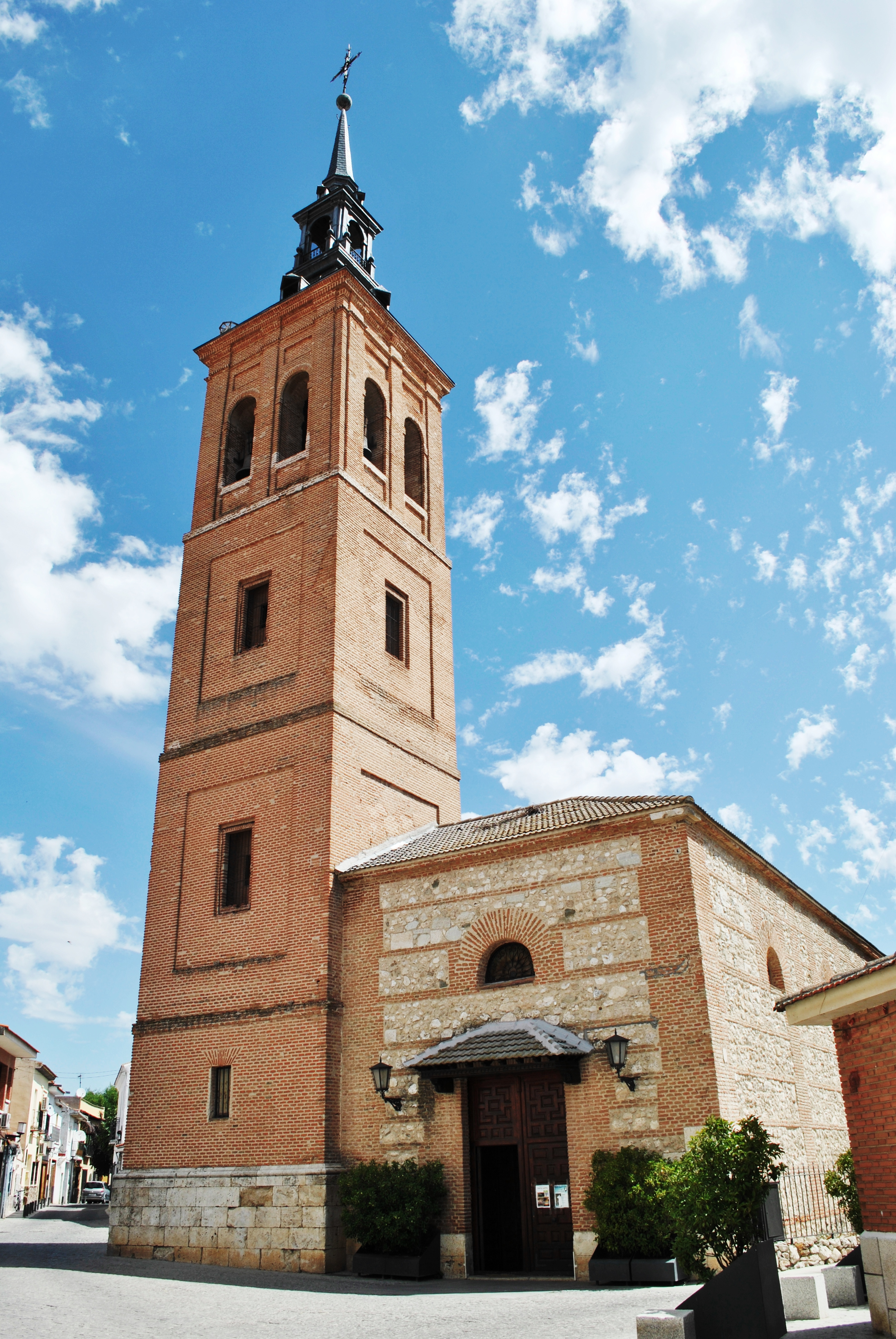

- Location within Spain
- 40.207772°N 3.569978°W
- Location: San Martín de la Vega, Spain

History
- Built: 16th-18th centuries

Site notes
- Architectural style: Herrerian

Spanish Cultural Heritage
- Official name: Iglesia de la Natividad de Nuestra Señora
- Type: Non-movable
- Criteria: Monument
- Designated: 1996
- Reference no.: RI-51-0009179

The Church of la Natividad de Nuestra Señora (Spanish: Iglesia de la Natividad de Nuestra Señora) is a church located in San Martín de la Vega, Spain. It was declared Bien de Interés Cultural in 1996.

Built in the 16th-18th centuries in Herrerian style, it has a rectangular plan, with a single nave, chapels and a sacristy.
