= Săpunaru Church =

Heritage site in Vrancea County, Romania

Coordinates: 45°41′56″N 27°11′18″E

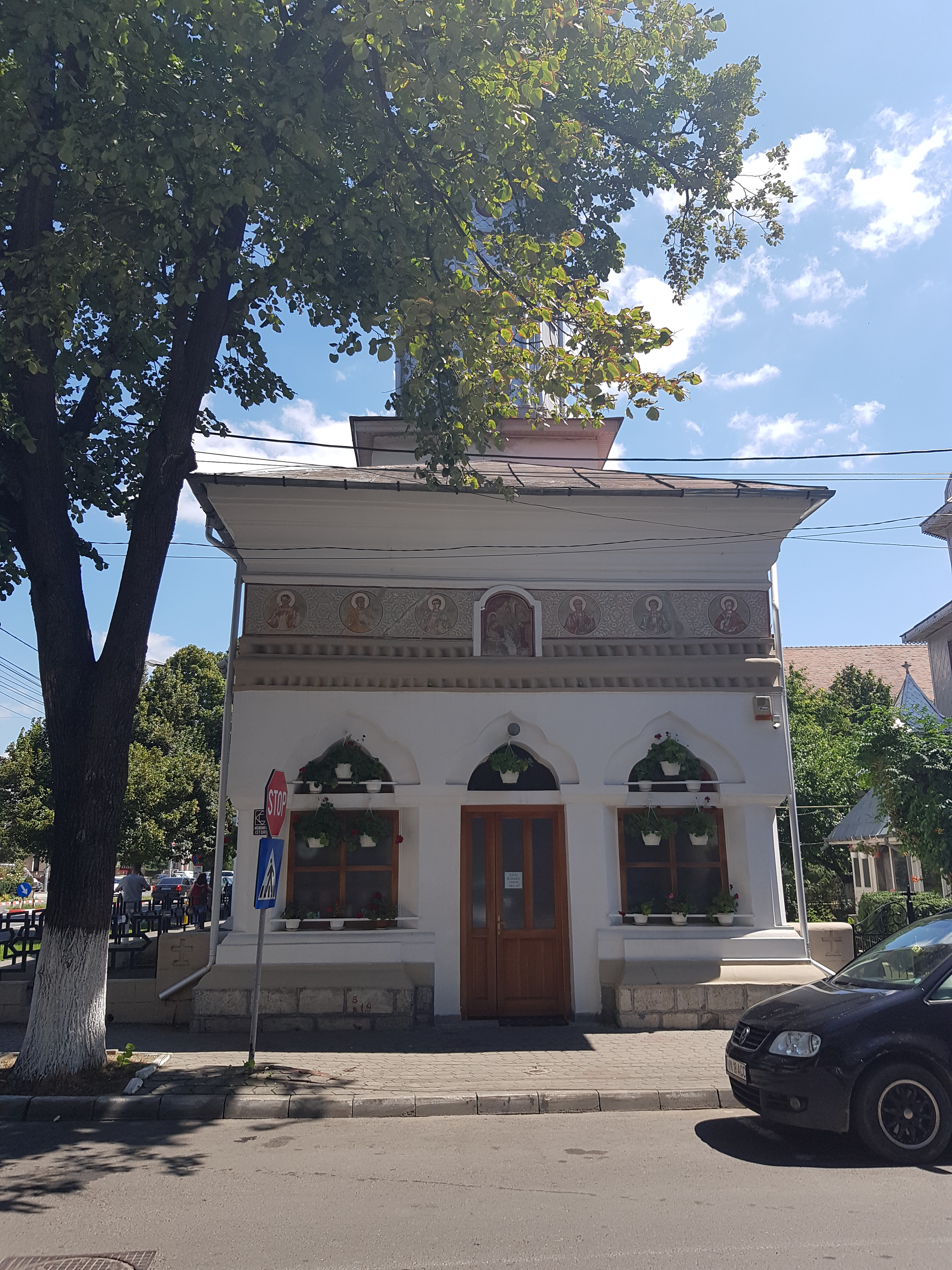
Săpunaru Church

The Săpunaru Church (Romanian: Biserica Nașterea Maicii Domnului - Săpunaru) is a Romanian Orthodox church located at 1 Simion Bărnuțiu Street in Focșani, Romania. It is dedicated to the Nativity of the Theotokos.

Located in the city center, the church dates to 1783. It was jointly financed by guild members: soap makers, chandlers, jacket makers and furriers. Among the main ktetors was Dima Săpunaru ("soap maker"). The building appears on the map drawn by the Austrian General Staff during the Austro-Turkish War (1788–1791).

Built of stone and masonry, the church is cross-shaped. The initially open portico has three-lobed arches sustained by masonry pillars. The facade is on two registers of bricks, separated by a strongly accented string course that surrounds the building above the windows. The interior features semi-spherical vaults.

The church is listed as a historic monument by Romania's Ministry of Culture and Religious Affairs.
