= Nativity of the Virgin (Beccafumi) =

Painting by Domenico Beccafumi

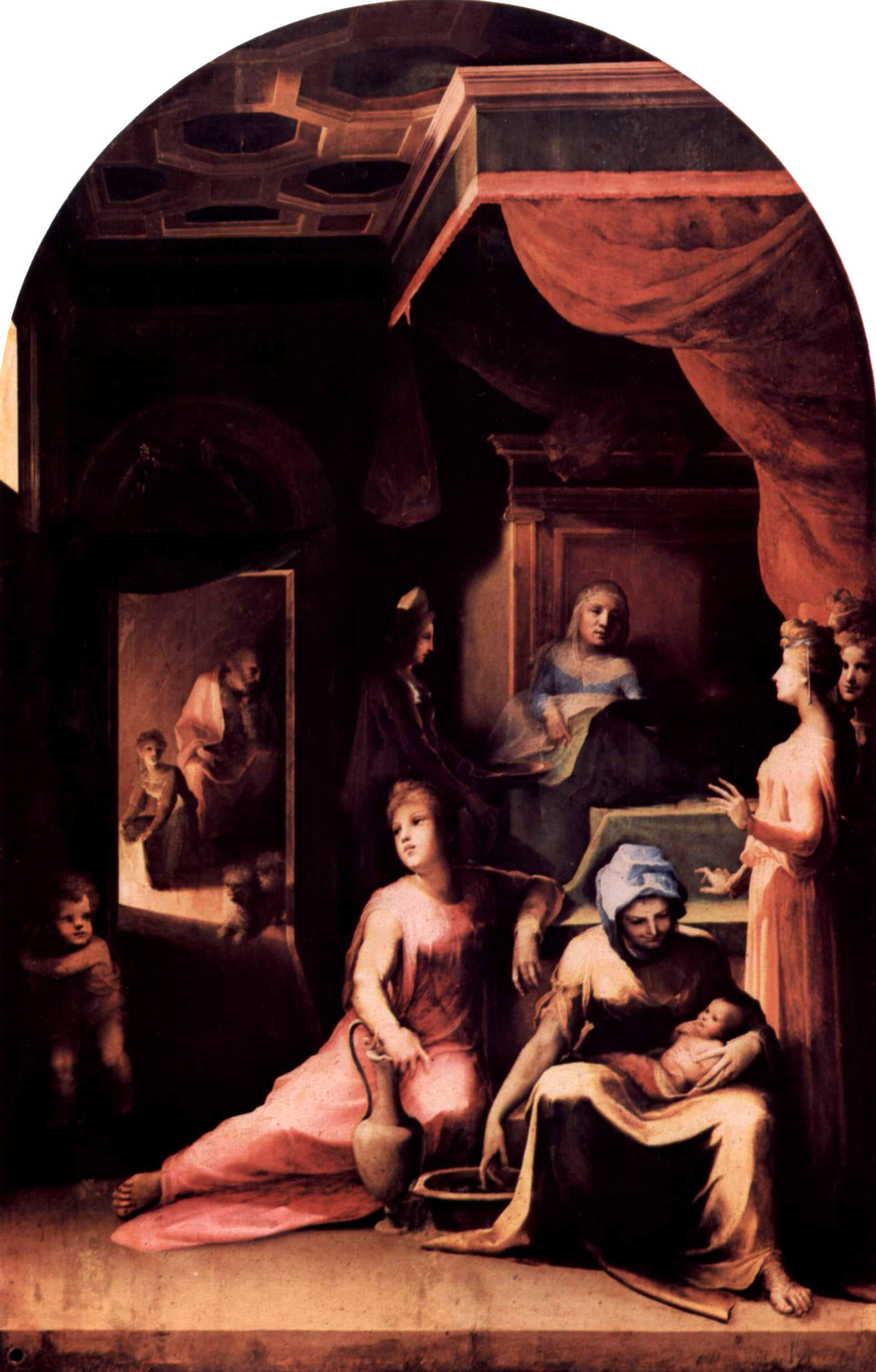
- Artist: Domenico Beccafumi
- Year: c. 1540–1543
- Medium: oil on panel
- Dimensions: 233 cm × 145 cm (92 in × 57 in)
- Location: Pinacoteca Nazionale, Siena

Nativity of the Virgin is an oil on panel painting by Domenico Beccafumi, now in the Pinacoteca Nazionale in Siena. Painted for Santi Pietro e Paolo, it has been dated to 1540–1543 by its stylistic similarities to the paintings produced by the artist on Moses and the evangelists for Pisa Cathedral and to some scenes from the pavement of Siena Cathedral. It may have originally had a predella - Sammniatelli identifies the predella's panels as a number of paintings now in a private collection in Somerset.

== Bibliography ==
- (in Italian) Anna Maria Francini Ciaranfi, Beccafumi, Sadea Editore/Sansoni, Firenze 1967.
