= Nativity of the Theotokos Monastery =

Church building in Artaion Municipality, Greece

- Μονή Γενεσίου της Θεοτόκου
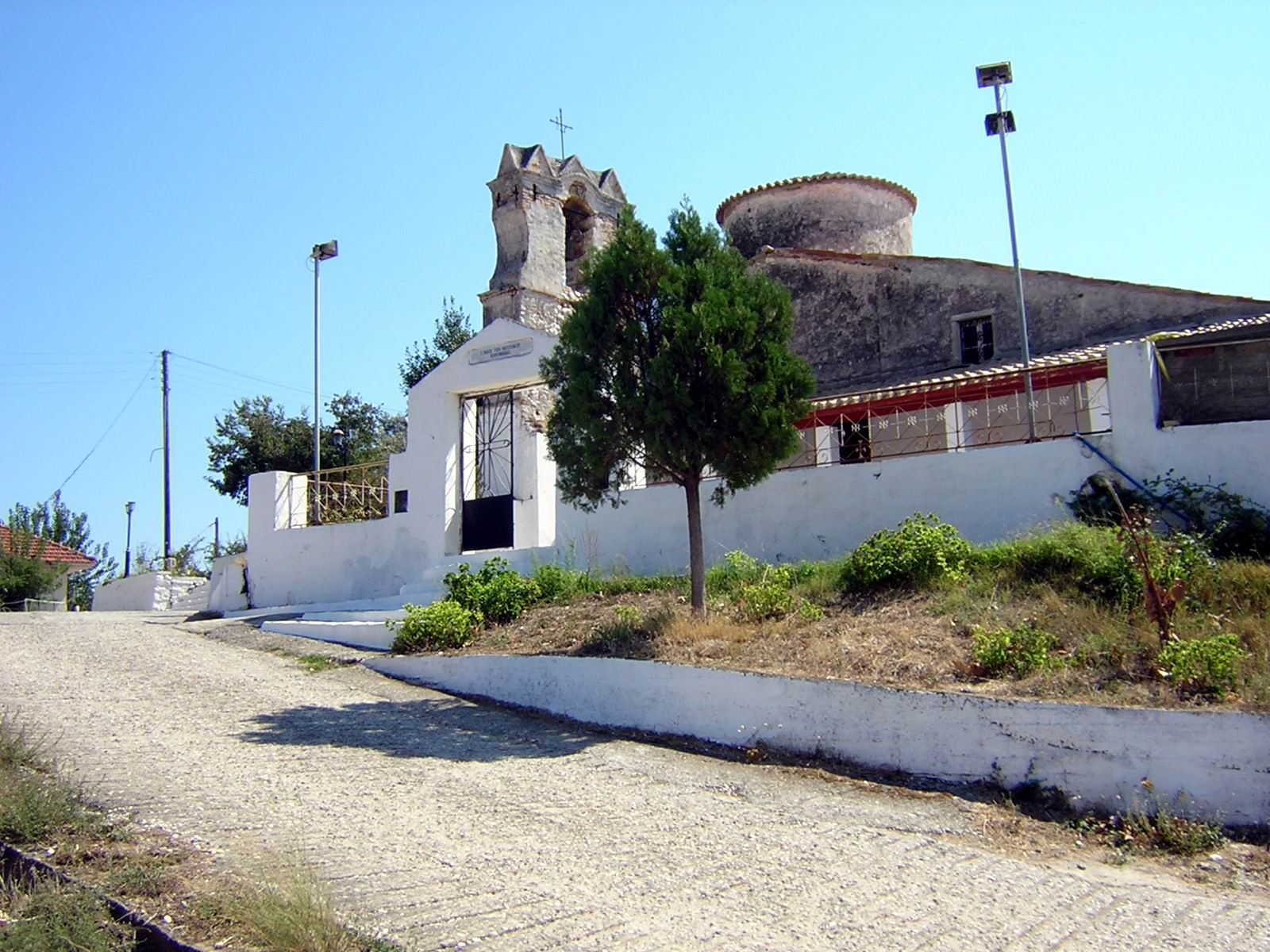

Monastery information
- Established: 10th century
- Diocese: Metropolis of Nikopolis and Preveza

Site
- Location: Koronisia, Arta, Greece
- Country: Greece
- Coordinates: 39°00′57″N 20°54′56″E

The Nativity of the Theotokos Monastery (Greek: Μονή Γενεσίου της Θεοτόκου) is a monument of the middle Byzantine period on the island of Koronisia that for centuries played an important role in the area of the Ambracian Gulf.

== Structure and location ==
The church is located in a central point of the settlement of Koronisia. It is a small building of 15 by 7.30 metres (49.2 ft × 24.0 ft), which consists of three interconnected parts: the main church, a narthex and an outer narthex. The main temple belongs to the rare type of semi-inscribed cruciform with a dome. On the west side of the church there is the narthex covered with a continuous semi-cylindrical dome while the outer narthex is covered with a wooden roof. The entrance to the temple is possible through two doors while the floor of the temple is made of slabs, in the center of which a relief marble slab with the decorative theme of the five loaves is preserved. The Holy Altar is built. Few and poorly preserved frescoes are preserved in the main church and the narthex.

Of great interest is the 19th century wood-carved iconostasis, which bears a multitude of fully-carved floral and animal decorations. The image of Christ on the iconostasis dates from 1854, while the other icons are from 1884 to 1885. Along the north side of the temple there is an elongated portico with a wooden roof. The spire belongs to the perforated wall type and has a width of 2.90 m and a height of 7.75 m. According to the foundation inscription, the spire was built at the end of the 19th century. Attached to the temple is a now-ruined building that in the past housed the olive press of the Monastery, while next to it was the koulia, where the monks lived. According to the sources, the specific building was renovated in 1870 by the abbot Archimandrite Ambrosios Rafailidis.

== History ==
The church was built at the end of the 10th century. Historically, the first source that informs us of the existence of the Monastery are two notes from 1193, in the Gospel of the Monastery of Mega Spilaio where it is mentioned that the abbot was Methodios. Cyriacus of Ancona visited Arta in 1436 and informs us that he attended the liturgy held in the church of Panagia and was hosted in the monastery. The Monastery of Koronisia had a large property mainly on the coasts of Aetolia-Acarnania and fish farms in Kalogeriko Artas, while it was particularly known for the eel farms it had in the Ambracian gulf, because of which the monks received threats from the inhabitants of Vonitsa. A letter of Patriarch Jeremias I, in 1530, to the bishop of Vonitsa, in which he ordered them not to harass the monks of Koronisia, is mentioned.

In 1603, Sultan Mehmed III sent a decree to the governor of the Karleli sanjak and the kadis of Arta, Agia Mavra and Vonitsa and requested that the military authorities stop disturbing the monks and respect the property of the monastery at Myrtari in Vonitsa. In 1670 it was radically renovated by the hieromonk Eugene of Kostakioi, who went to the monastery of Koronisia and built the cells of the monastery and gathered the monks. In 1860, the Ottoman government built, for the protection of the fish farms of the monastery, a small fortress, the "koulia" of Koronisia. In 1918 the Monastery of Koronisia ceased to function as a monastery and became a metochion of the monastery of Prophet Elijah in Iliovounia and was converted into a parish church. In 1969, by ministerial decision, the temple was declared a preserved monument. In 1969 a ministerial decree made the monastery a listed site.

== Sources ==
- Η Κορακονησία, Αφέντρα Γ. Μουτζάλη, τεύχος 109, Αρχαιολογία και Τέχνες.
- Η Παναγία της Κορωνησίας, Βαρβάρα Παπαδοπούλου, Άρτα, 2016.
