= Church of the Nativity of the Theotokos (Mariupol) =

Church in Ukraine destroyed by the Soviet government

Church of the Nativity of the Virgin
- Church of the Nativity of the Virgin, Mariupol
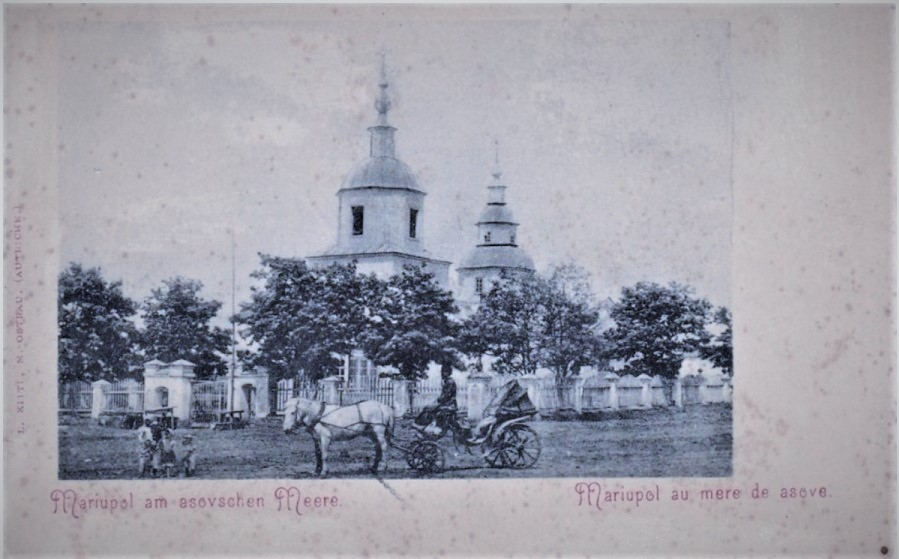
- Photo from 1900

- Location within Ukraine
- 47°06′34″N 37°33′43.8″E
- Location: Mariupol
- Country: Ukraine

History
- Status: Church
- Founded: 1780
- Dedication: Nativity of Mary

Architecture
- Functional status: destroyed (1936)
- Completed: 1780

Specifications
- Materials: Brick

The Church of the Nativity of the Theotokos was an 18th century church located in the city of Mariupol in Ukraine.

== History ==
Between 1770 and 1780, a stone building was built in its place, and consecrated in 1780. The painter Arkhip Kuindzhi was baptized in the Church of the Nativity of the Virgin and married there in 1875 with Vera Leontyevna Kechedzhi-Shapovalova, the daughter of a wealthy merchant from Mariupol.

In Soviet times, the church was destroyed in 1936 by the Bolshevik government as part of the Atheist Five-Year Plan. The baptismal font of the destroyed church can be found today in the Kuindzhi Art Museum.

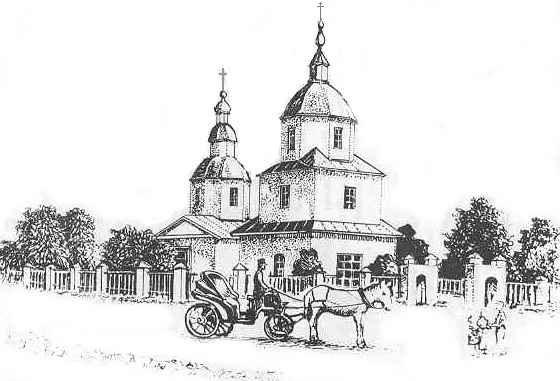

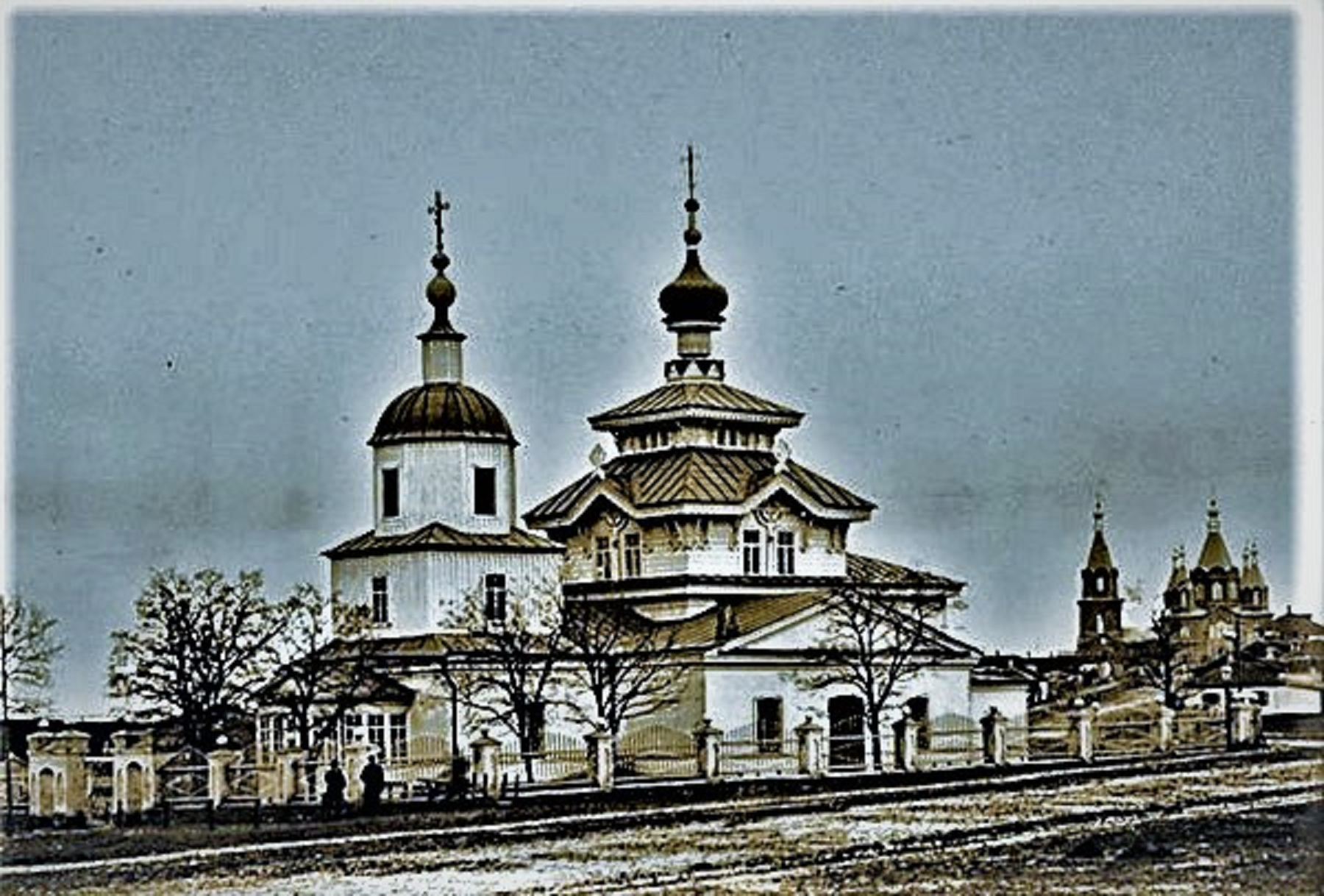
