= Church of the Nativity of the Theotokos, Obiliq =

Serbian Orthodox Church in Obiliq, Kosovo

Coordinates: 42°41′24″N 21°04′40″E

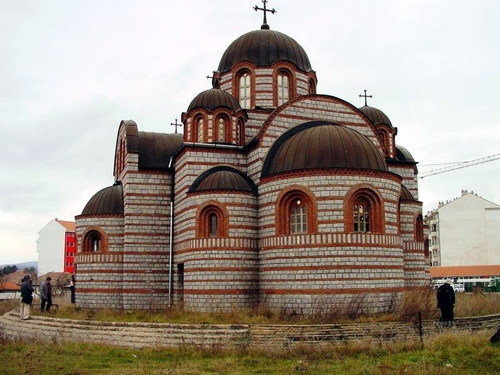
The Church, in the center of Obiliq

The Church of the Nativity of the Most Holy Mother of God (Albanian: Kisha e Zonjushës; Serbian: Црква Мала Госпојина / Crkva Mala Gospojina) is a Serbian Orthodox Church in Obiliq, Kosovo. As of 2008, it serves some 2,200 Serbs in the municipality of Obiliq. It is ecclesiastically part of the Eparchy of Raška and Prizren.

It was left during the Kosovo War. The first liturgical service was held in 2003, on the Nativity of the Theotokos (8 September). It was damaged in the 2004 unrest (17–18 March) but has since been partially renovated.
