= Obudovac =

Obudovac Обудовац (Serbian)
- Village (Selo)
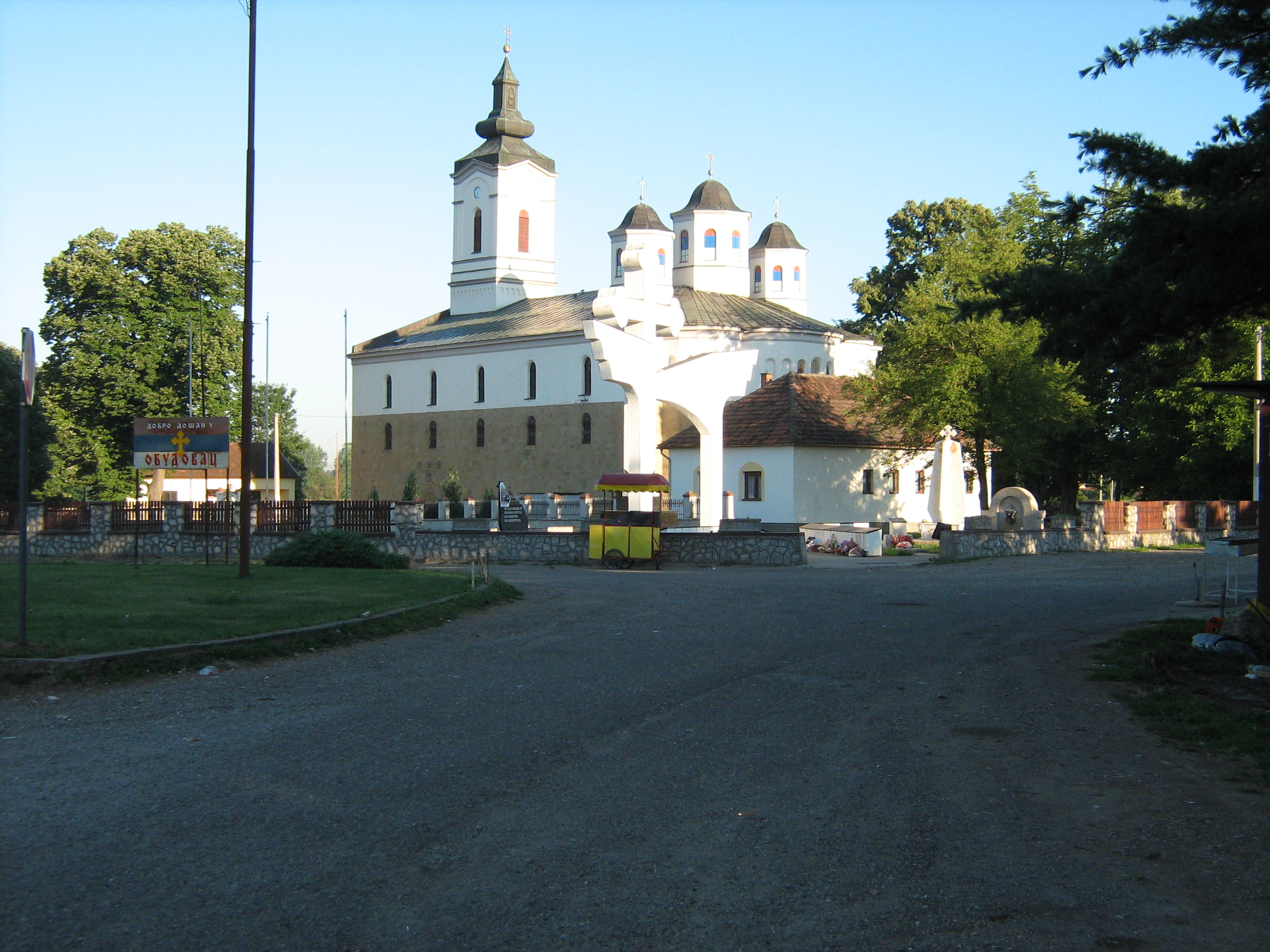
- Obudovac Orthodox Church

- Location within Bosnia and Herzegovina
- Coordinates: 44°58′07″N 18°36′04″E
- Country: Bosnia and Herzegovina
- Entity: Republika Srpska
- Municipality: Šamac
- Time zone: UTC+1 (CET)
  - Summer (DST): UTC+2 (CEST)

Obudovac (Serbian Cyrillic: Обудовац) is a village in the municipality of Šamac.
