= Church of the Nativity of the Theotokos, Zărnești =

Orthodox church in Zărnești, Romania

Coordinates: 45°33′44″N 25°18′44″E

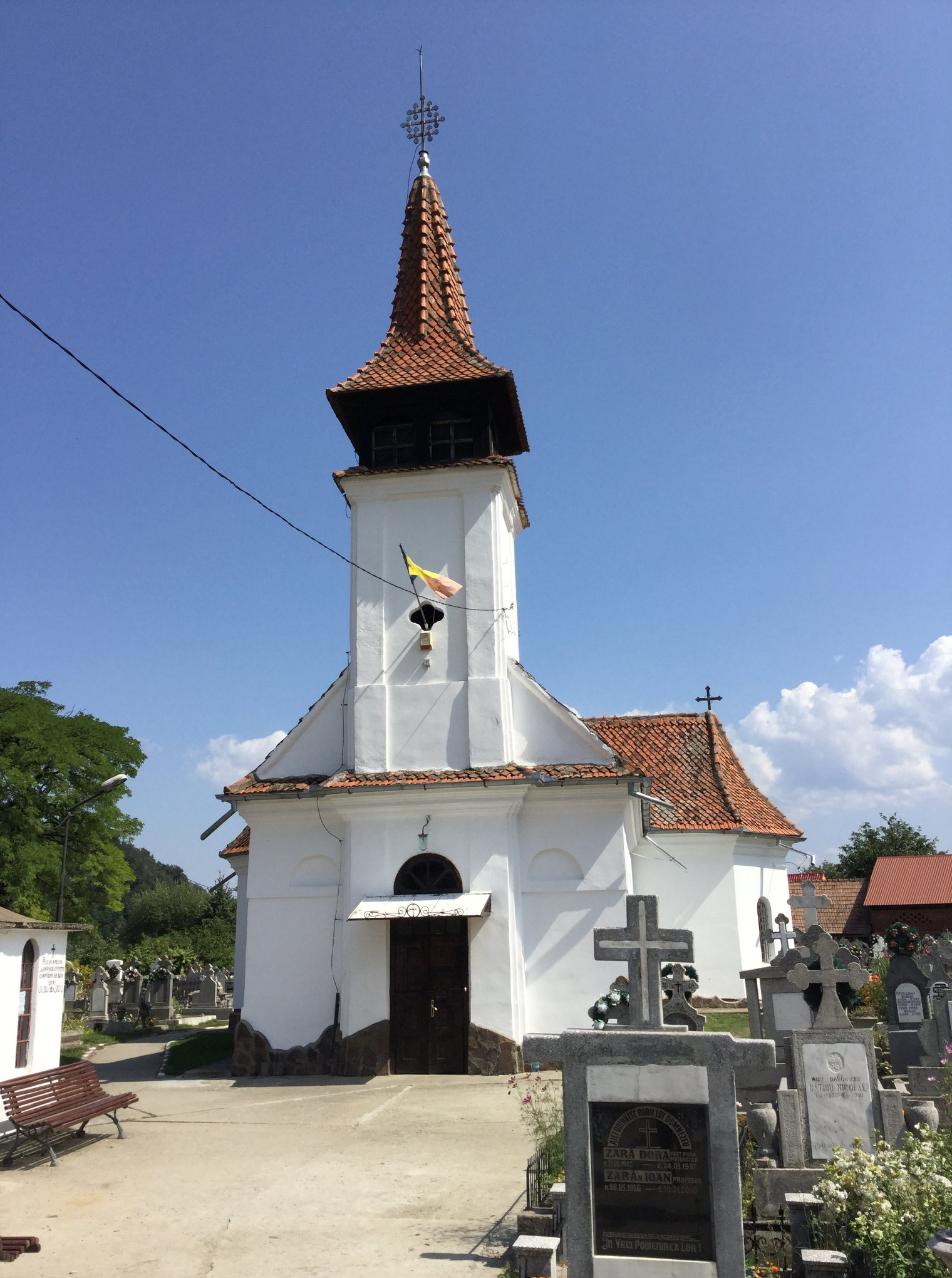
Church of the Nativity of the Theotokos

The Church of the Nativity of the Theotokos (Romanian: Biserica Nașterea Maicii Domnului) is a Romanian Orthodox church located at 15 Tei Street, Zărnești, Romania. It is dedicated to the Nativity of Mary.

The church dates to 1791; at the time, it was on the edge of the locality. The town’s Orthodox cemetery gradually built up around it. The property is situated on a hill above the banks of the Bârsa River.

The church is listed as a historic monument by Romania's Ministry of Culture and Religious Affairs.
