= Church of the Nativity of the Blessed Virgin Mary (Konygin) =

- Церковь Рождества Пресвятой Богородицы
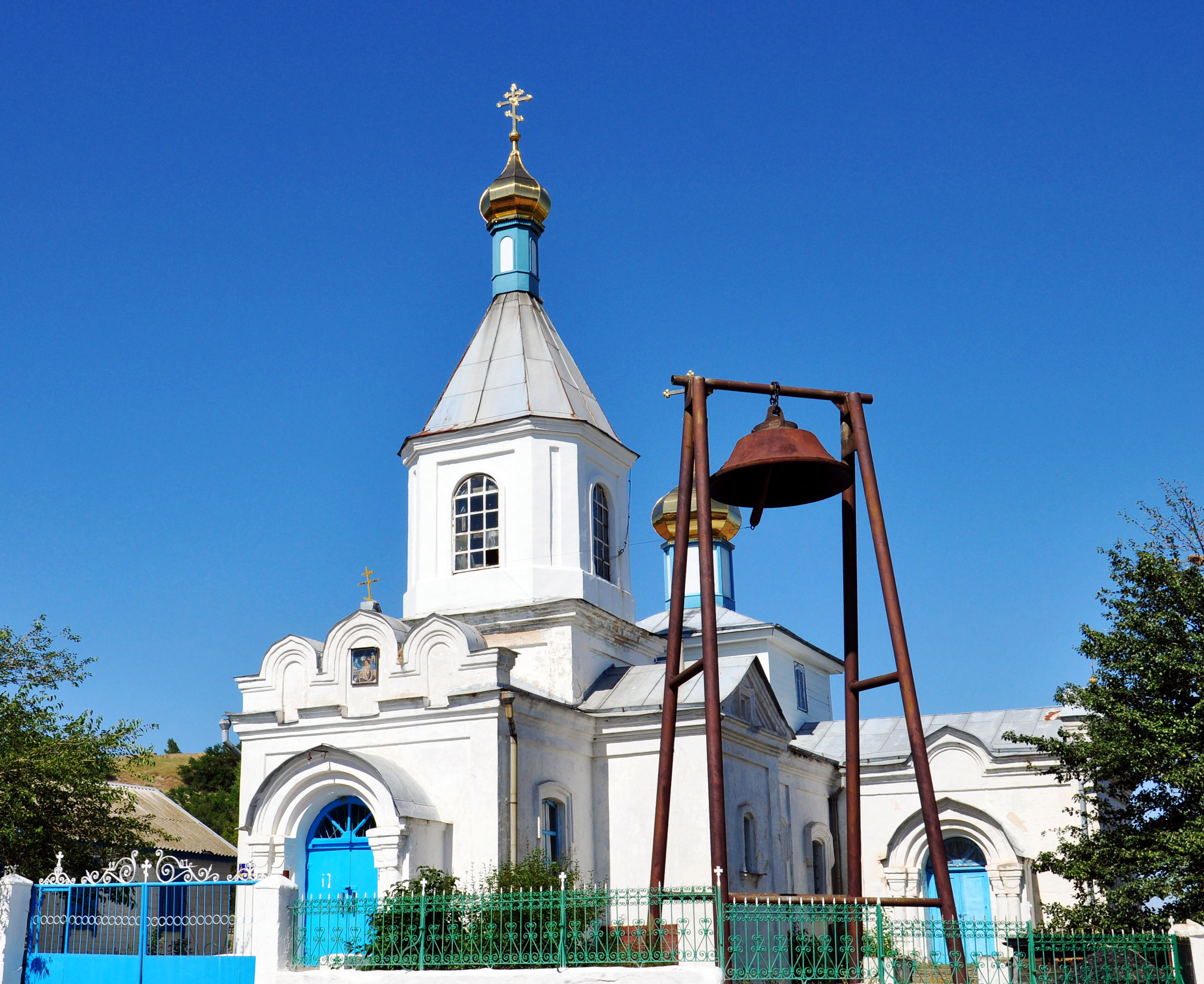
- Church of the Nativity of the Blessed Virgin Mary in 2012
- Church of the Nativity of the Blessed Virgin Mary
- 47.3535°N 40.4134°E
- Location: Konygin khutor, Kamensky District, Rostov Oblast
- Country: Russia
- Denomination: Eastern Orthodox

History
- Status: Parish church
- Dedication: Nativity of the Blessed Virgin Mary

Architecture
- Functional status: Active
- Completed: 1879

Administration
- Division: Patriarchate of Moscow and All Russia
- Diocese: Volgodonsk Diocese
- Deanery: Ust-Donetskoe deanery

The Church of the Nativity of the Blessed Virgin Mary (Russian: Церковь Рождества Пресвятой Богородицы) is a Russian Orthodox church in Konygin khutor, Ust-Donetsky District, Rostov Oblast, Russia. It was built in 1879 and belongs to Ust-Donetskoe deanery of Volgodonsk Diocese. It is also the oldest church in Ust-Donetsky District, which has been preserved to the present day.

== History ==
Konygin khutor was founded in 1788 and for a long time the settlement hadn't had its own church, so its inhabitants had to go for six kilometers to Razdorskaya village ― to the Church of Our Lady of the Don. When this church became too small for both the residents of village and khutor, the farmers petitioned Don Archbishop about permission to build a new church. The permission was given, and collection of funds for its construction began, yet the Russian-Turkish war that started in 1877 interfered the plans of Kynygyn dwellers, many of whom went to war. When the Cossacks returned home the following year, a stone church was laid in honor of the Nativity of the Blessed Virgin. In 1879 the church was completed and consecrated. In 1883 the church became an independent parish church, parishioners of which were residents of two khutors ― Kanyginsky and Olkhovsky.

October Revolution brought harsh times to the khutor anc church. In the 1920–1930s, a bell was torn from the bell tower, the church building was boarded up, planning to turn it into a warehouse. And when, in the summer of 1962, the church in Razdorskaya village was blown up, and the explosives were also brought in Konygin for the same purposes, the residents managed to save their church from destruction.

Now the church is functioning again. In 2003 the old domes were replaced with new, gilded ones.

== Gallery ==
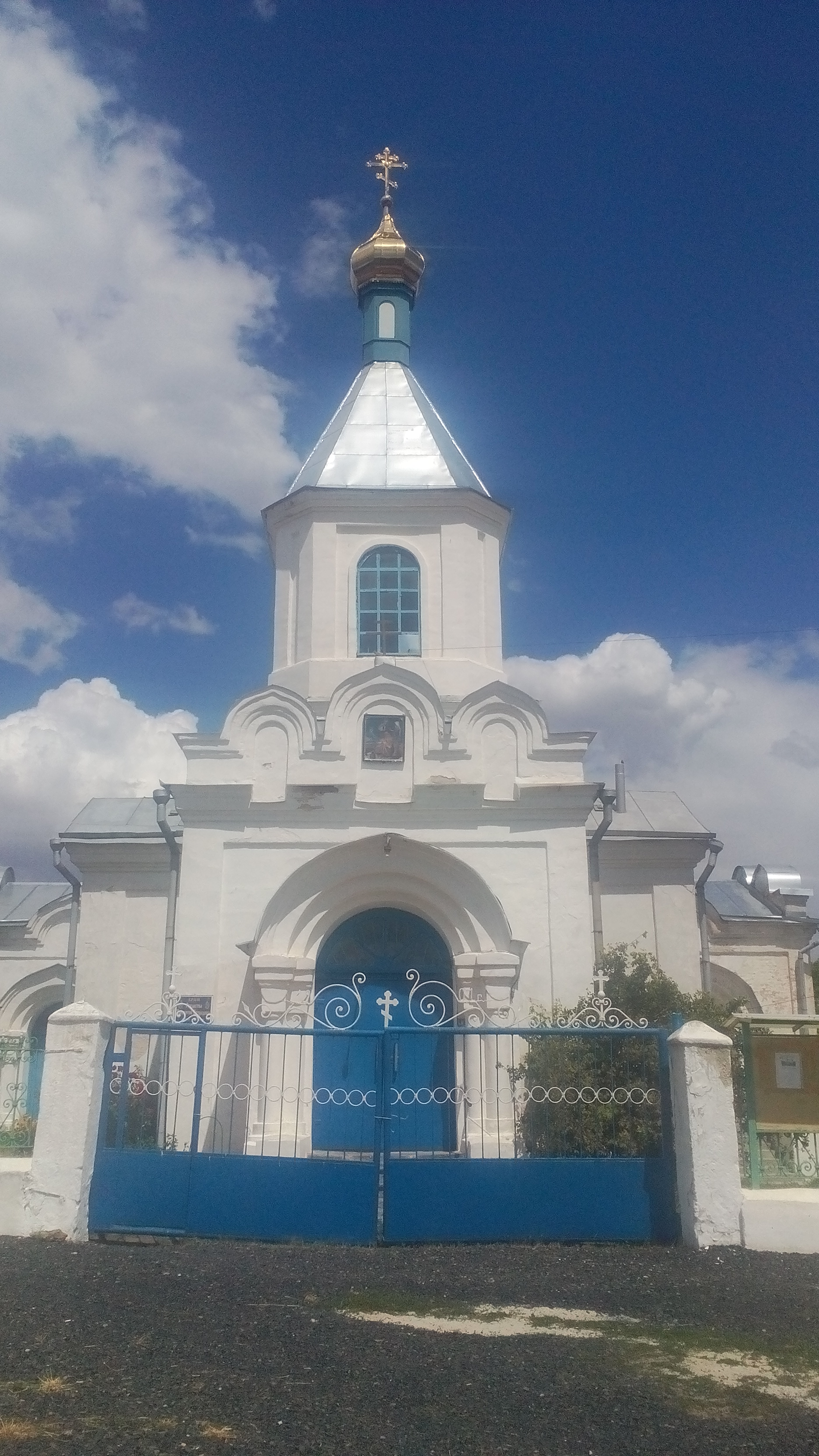

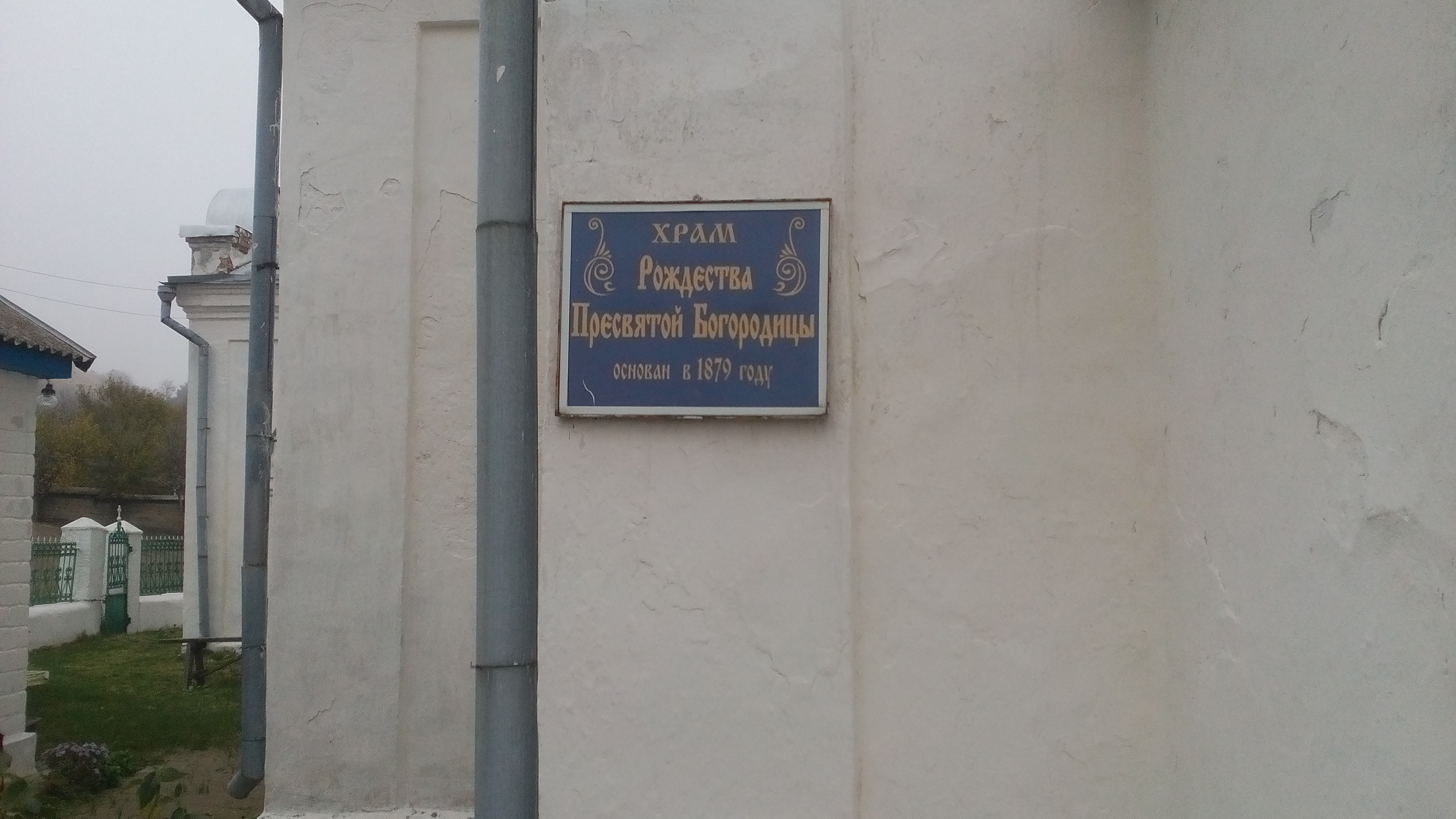

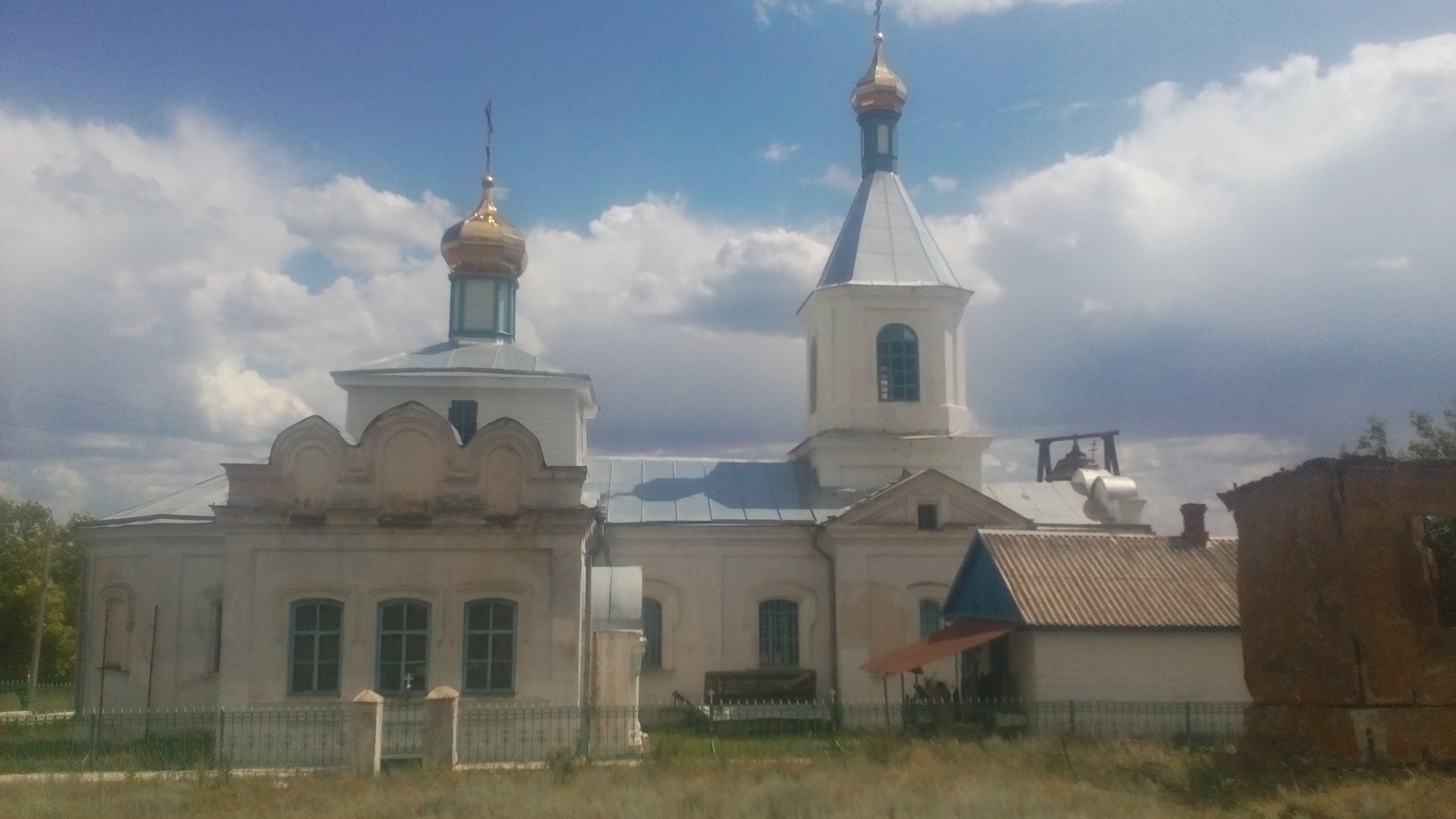

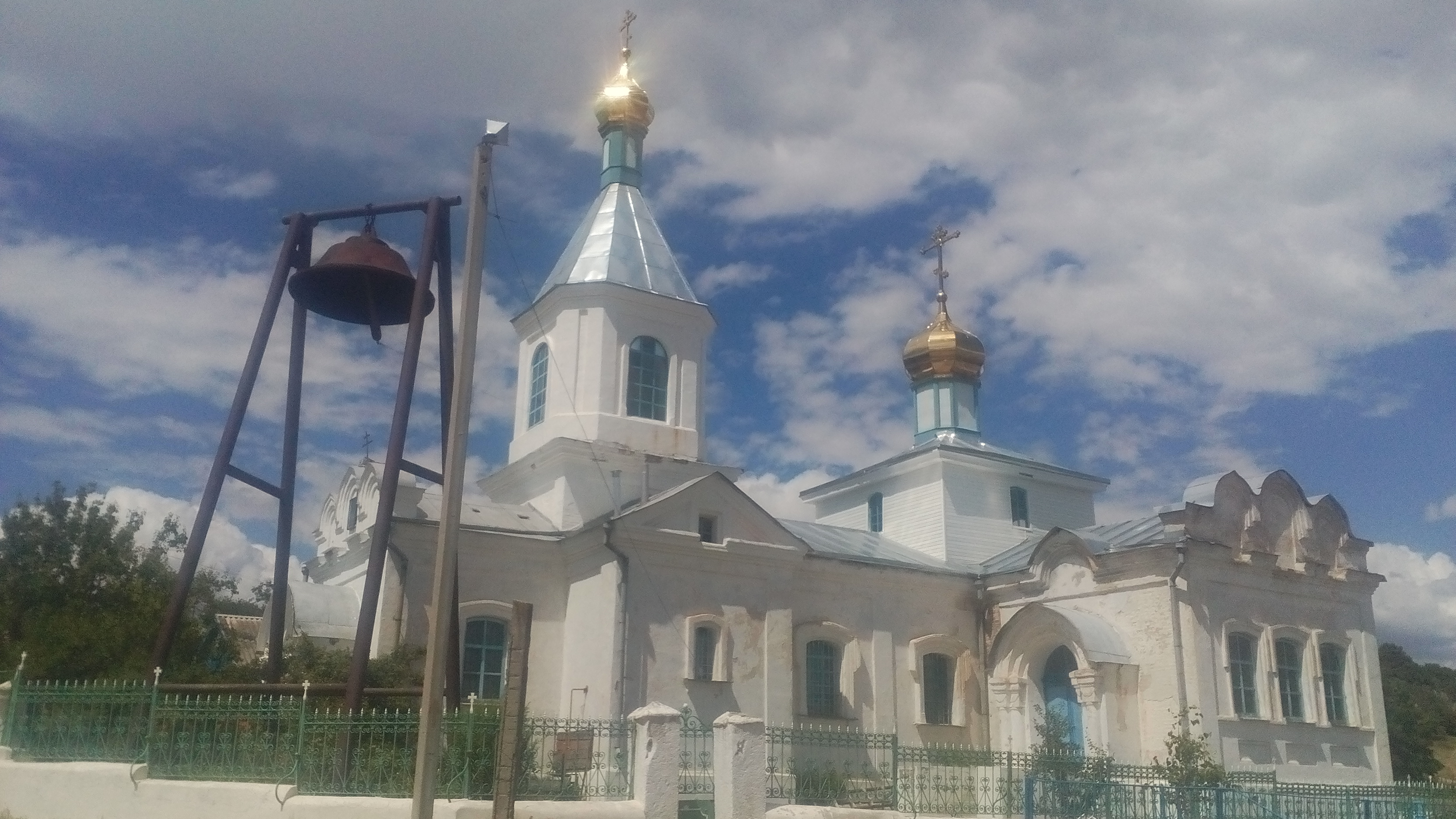

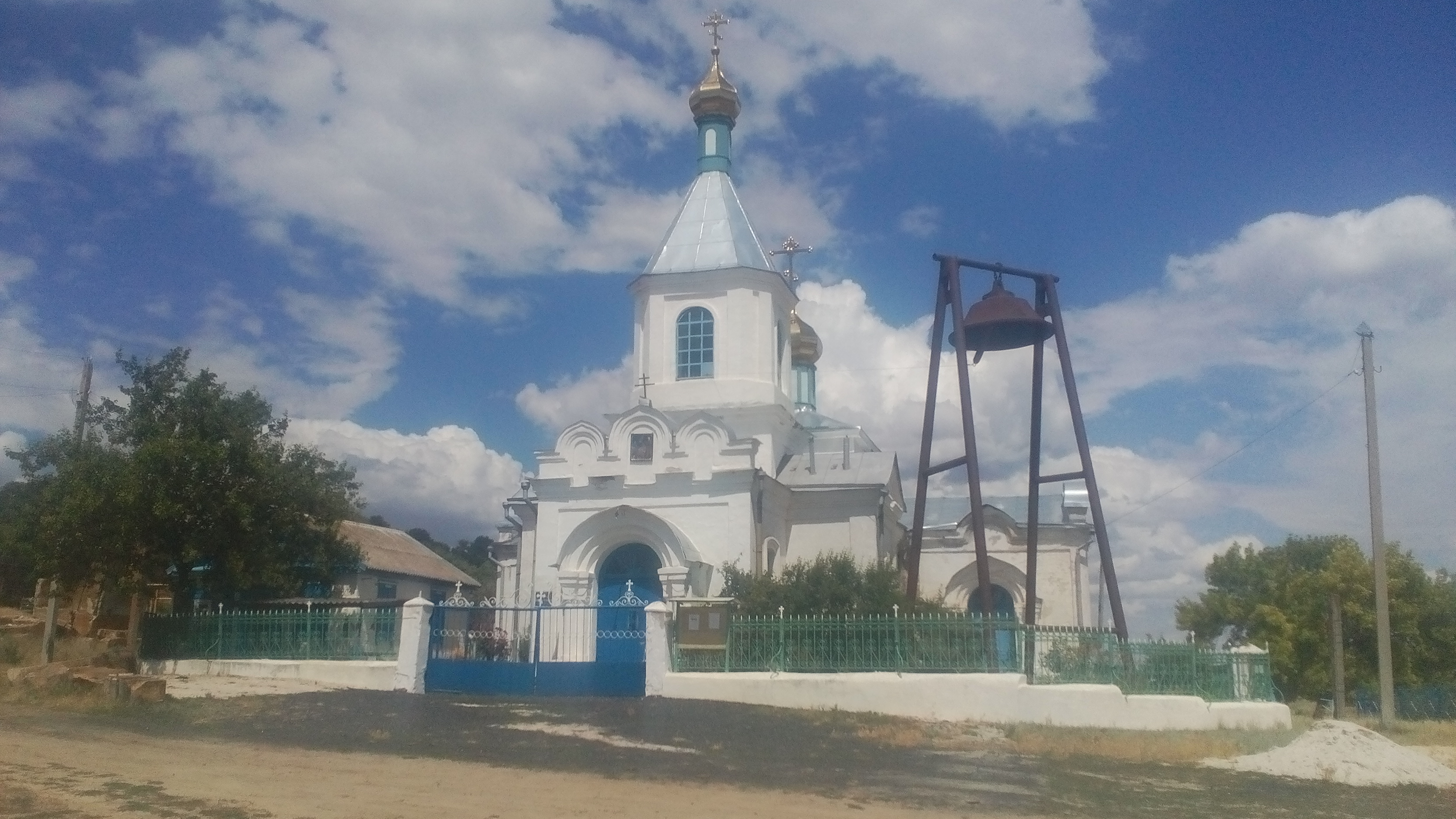
