= Church of the Nativity of the Virgin Mary (Prague) =

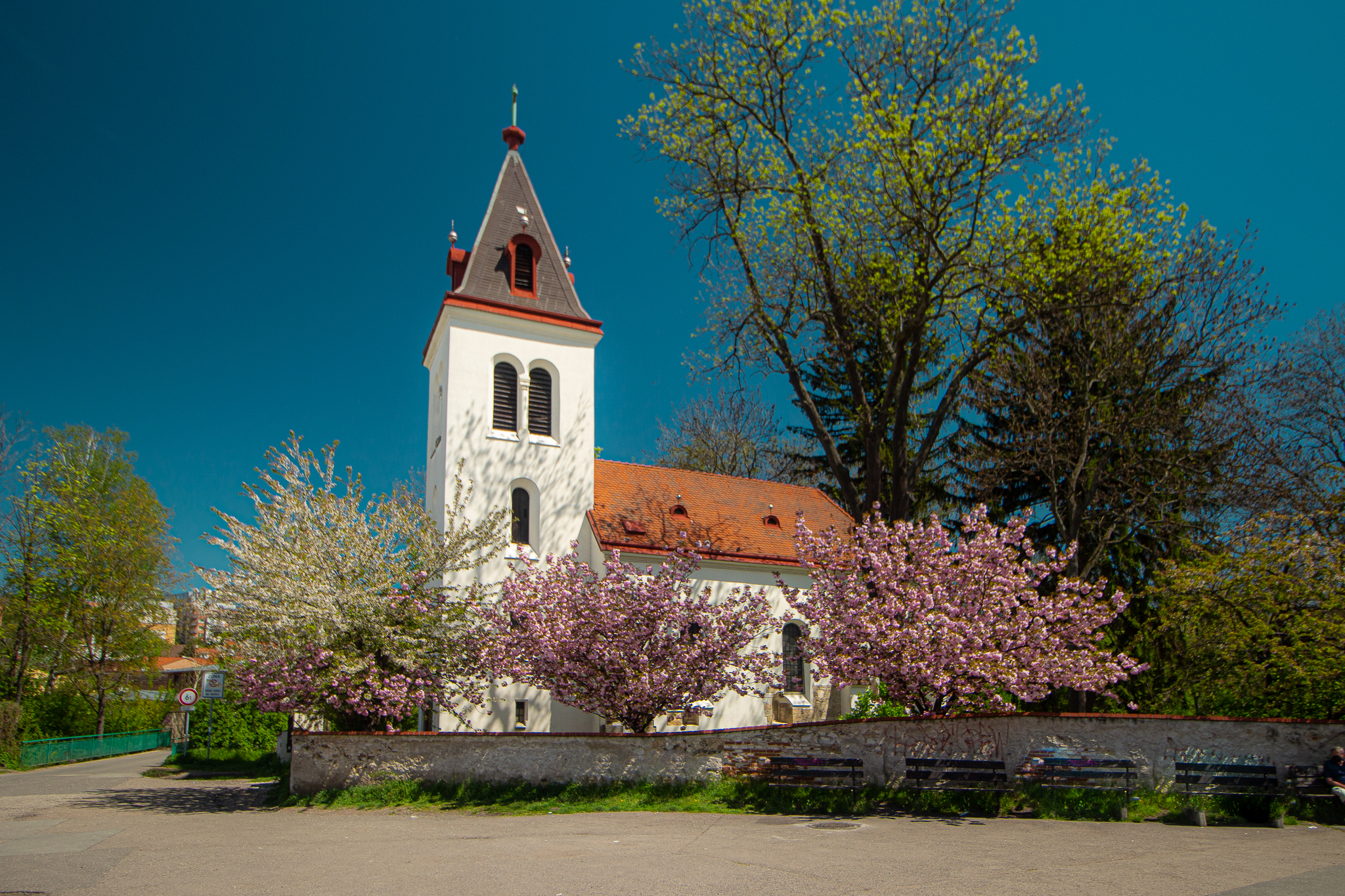
- Church of the Nativity of the Virgin Mary
- 50°03′10″N 14°29′15″E
- Location: Prague
- Country: Czech Republic
- Denomination: Roman Catholic
- Website: www.centrumhostivar.cz/O-farnosti/Kostel-Narozeni-Panny-Marie/

Architecture
- Years built: c. 1225

The Catholic Church of the Nativity of the Virgin Mary (Kostel Narození Panny Marie) is a Romanesque church located in Prague (District of Prague 10, Záběhlice), Czech Republic. It is protected as a cultural monument.

== History ==
The origins of the church date back to the first half of the 12th century (around 1125). During the 14th century, the church was rebuilt in the Romanesque-Gothic style. At that time, it used to be a parish church. In the 19th century, the original Romanesque tower was destroyed by lightning, and subsequently replaced by a Neo-Romanesque tower between 1876 and 1880. The altar painting of the Blessed Virgin Mary was created in 1861. The church has three bells, the first two are dated 1876 and give a brief history of the church and the third is dated 1889.

Major repairs were also made in 1948, and the façade was repaired in 2000 with financial support from the district of Prague 10.

The building is registered in the Central list of cultural monuments of the Czech Republic under number 18231/2-1939.
