= Church of the Nativity of the Theotokos, Zabrđe =

Coordinates: 42°25′10″N 18°35′50″E

Church of the Nativity of the Theotokos
- Црква рођења пресвете Богородице
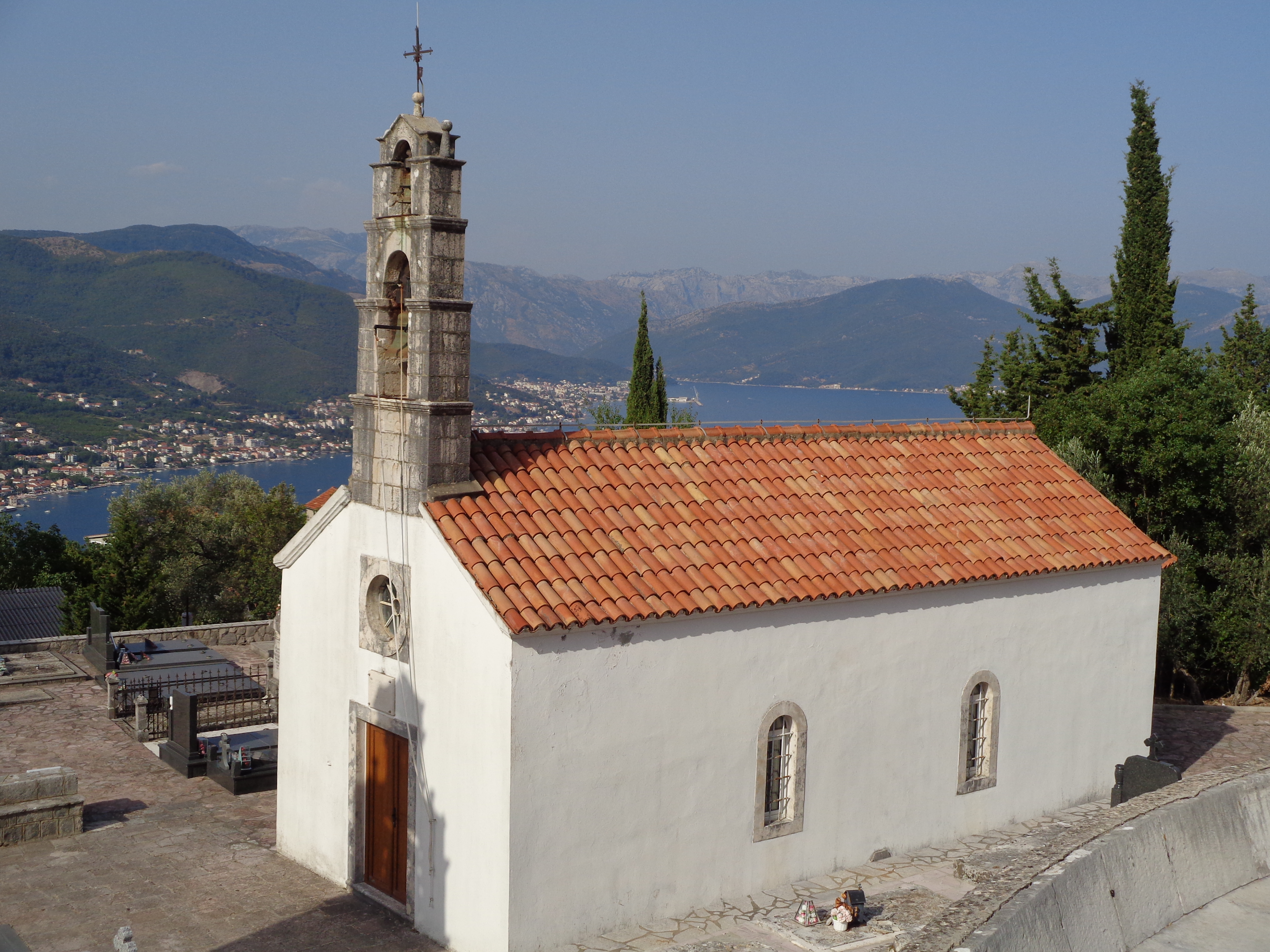
- Church of the Nativity of the Theotokos
- Church of the Nativity of the Theotokos
- Location: Zabrđe, Luštica, Herceg Novi
- Country: Montenegro
- Denomination: Serbian Orthodox

History
- Dedication: Nativity of Mary

Administration
- Archdiocese: Metropolitanate of Montenegro and the Littoral

The Church of the Nativity of the Theotokos (Serbian: Црква рођења пресвете Богородице, Crkva rođenja presvete Bogorodice) in Zabrđe on Luštica peninsula of the Herceg Novi municipality is a Serbian Orthodox church in Montenegro. The church is a listed protected cultural heritage of Montenegro. It is a part of historical cultural landscape of Zabrđe settlement and Luštica peninsula. This 18th century church was built at the site of an older church that was in ruined condition at the time of construction of the modern day building.

== Description ==
The church is dedicated to Nativity of the Theotokos and was built in 1783. It is one of the three Serbian Orthodox churches in Zabrđe, the other two being the Church of Saint Neđelja and the Church of Saint Andrew the First-Called.

== See also ==
- Metropolitanate of Montenegro and the Littoral
