= Headford United Church =

Orthodox Church of the Nativity of the Mother of God
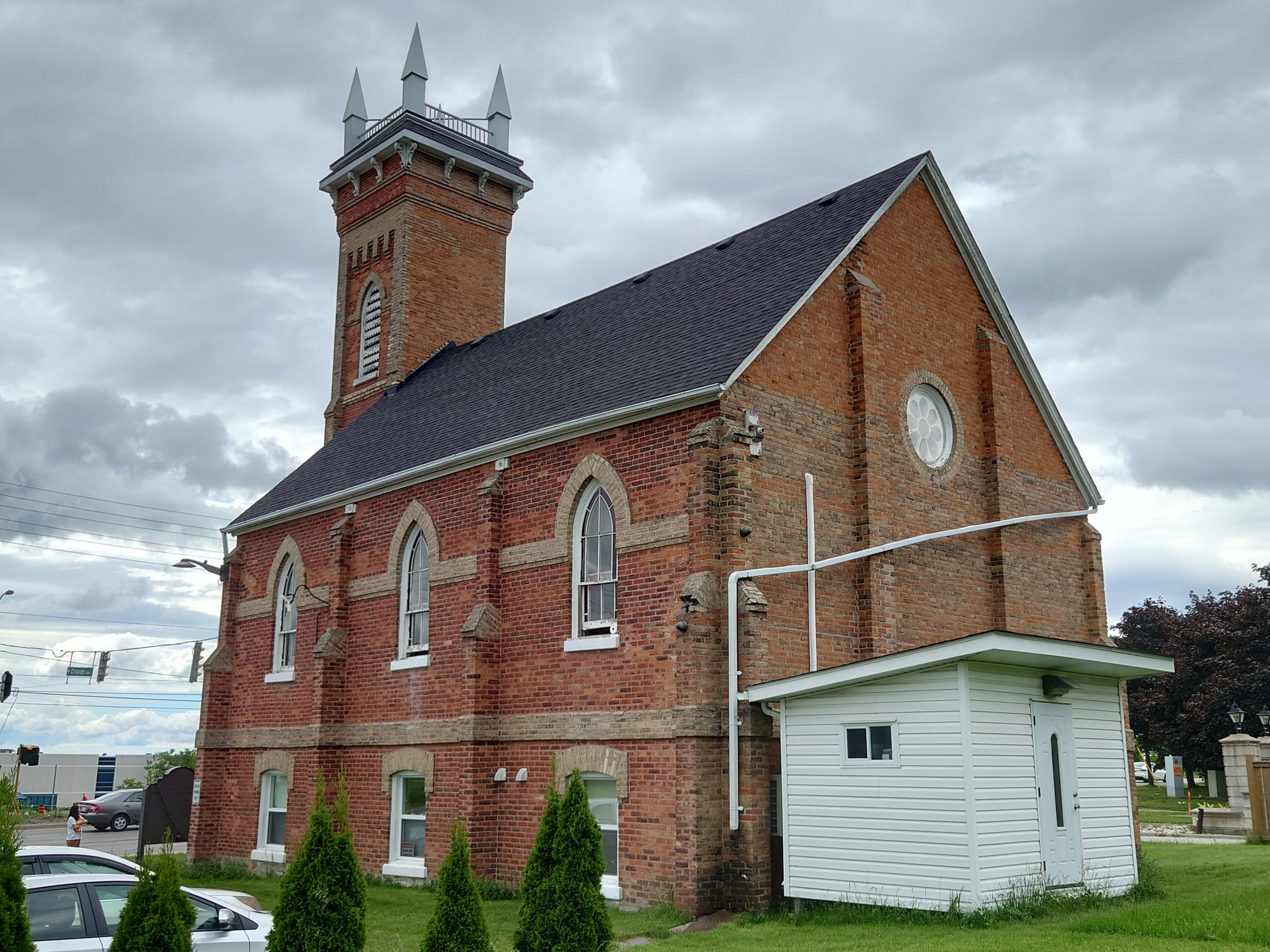
- Orthodox Church of the Nativity of the Mother of God
- 43°52′10″N 79°23′20″W
- Location: 9550 Leslie Street, Richmond Hill, Ontario
- Country: Canada
- Denomination: Russian Orthodox Church
- Previous denomination: Episcopalian Methodist, Methodist, United
- Website: pravoslavie.ca

Architecture
- Functional status: Active
- Heritage designation: Heritage Building
- Style: Gothic Revival

Headford United Church is a historic church in Richmond Hill, Ontario, Canada.

Currently known as Orthodox Church of the Nativity of the Mother of God.

== History ==
The origin of the United Church at Headford goes back to 1850, when Leek's Chapel was constructed on a 1/2 acre parcel of the Ritter farm in Markham Township. At the time, the congregation was part of the Markham circuit of the Methodist Episcopal Church. The circuit was formed in 1847. In the 1850s, a cemetery was established in association with the church.

By 1882, the congregation had outgrown the original building, and the present brick church was built on the same site to replace it. When the Episcopalian Methodists united with Wesleyan and Primitive Methodists in 1884, Headford became a part of the Richmond Hill circuit of the newly formed Methodist Church.

In 1914, the original spire of the church was destroyed by lightning.

In 1925, with the union of the Methodist Church, Presbyterians and Congregationalists in 1925, Headford became a member of the United Church of Canada.

The United church was closed in late 2010s. Since 2020, the building has been used by the Orthodox Church of the Nativity of the Mother of God, which belongs to the Russian Orthodox Church (through the Kyiv Pechersk Lavra in Ukraine). The church caters to Russian-speaking population of Richmond Hill and the surrounding areas.

== Gallery ==
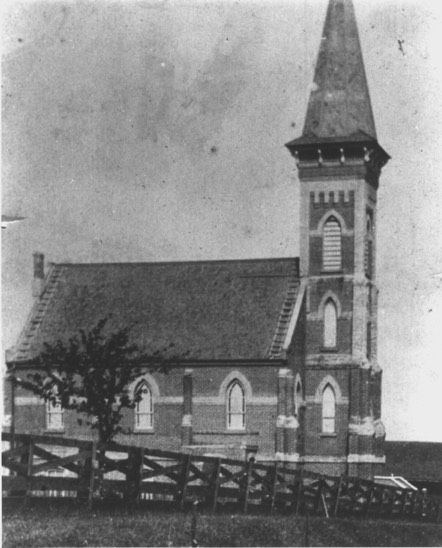
Headford Methodist Church with the original spire, 1914 or earlier

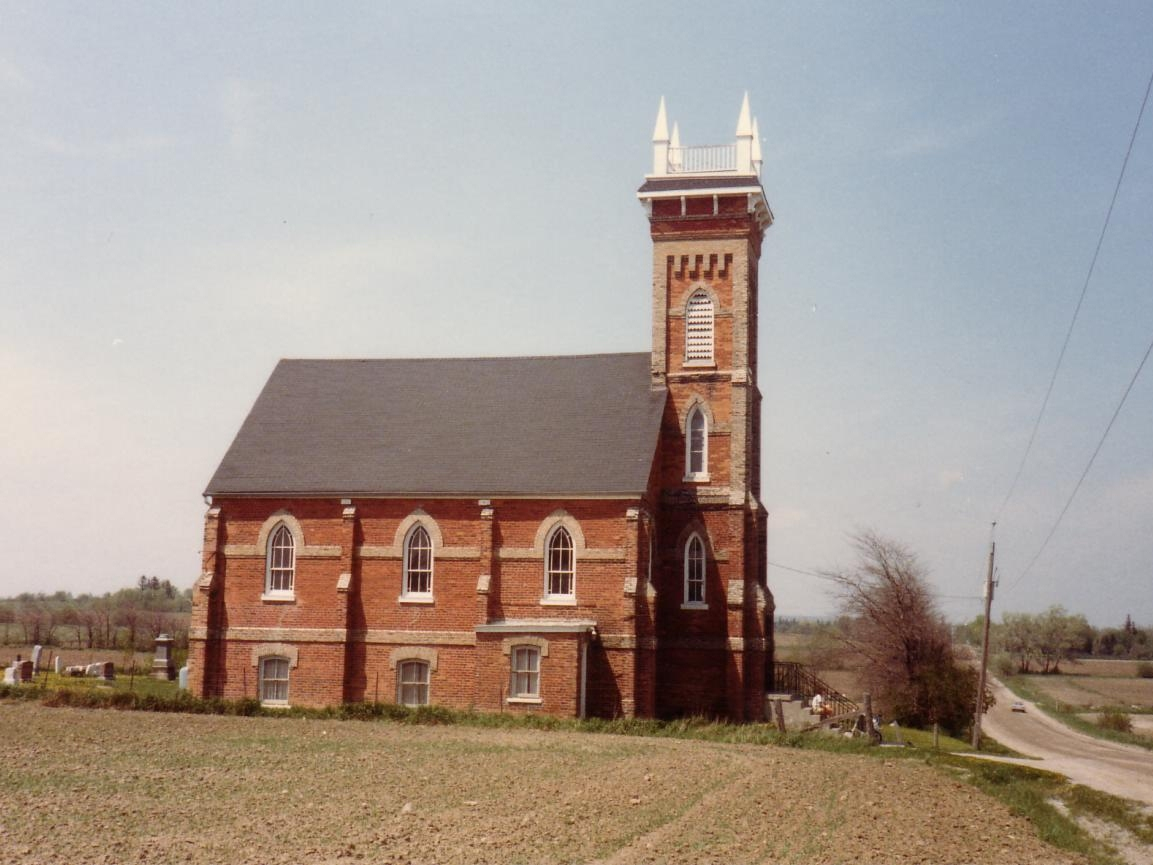
Headford United Church in 1984

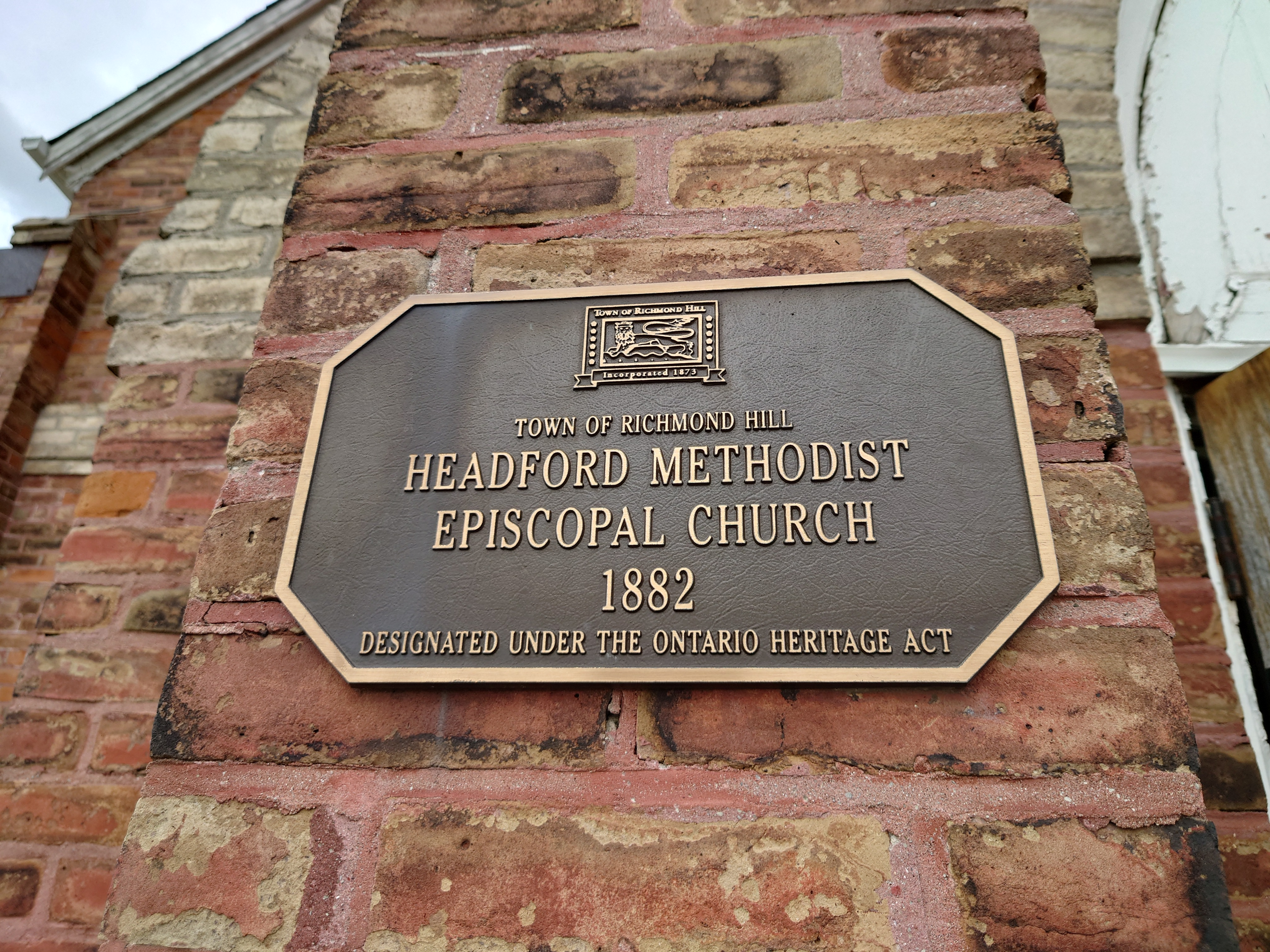
Ontario Heritage Act plaque

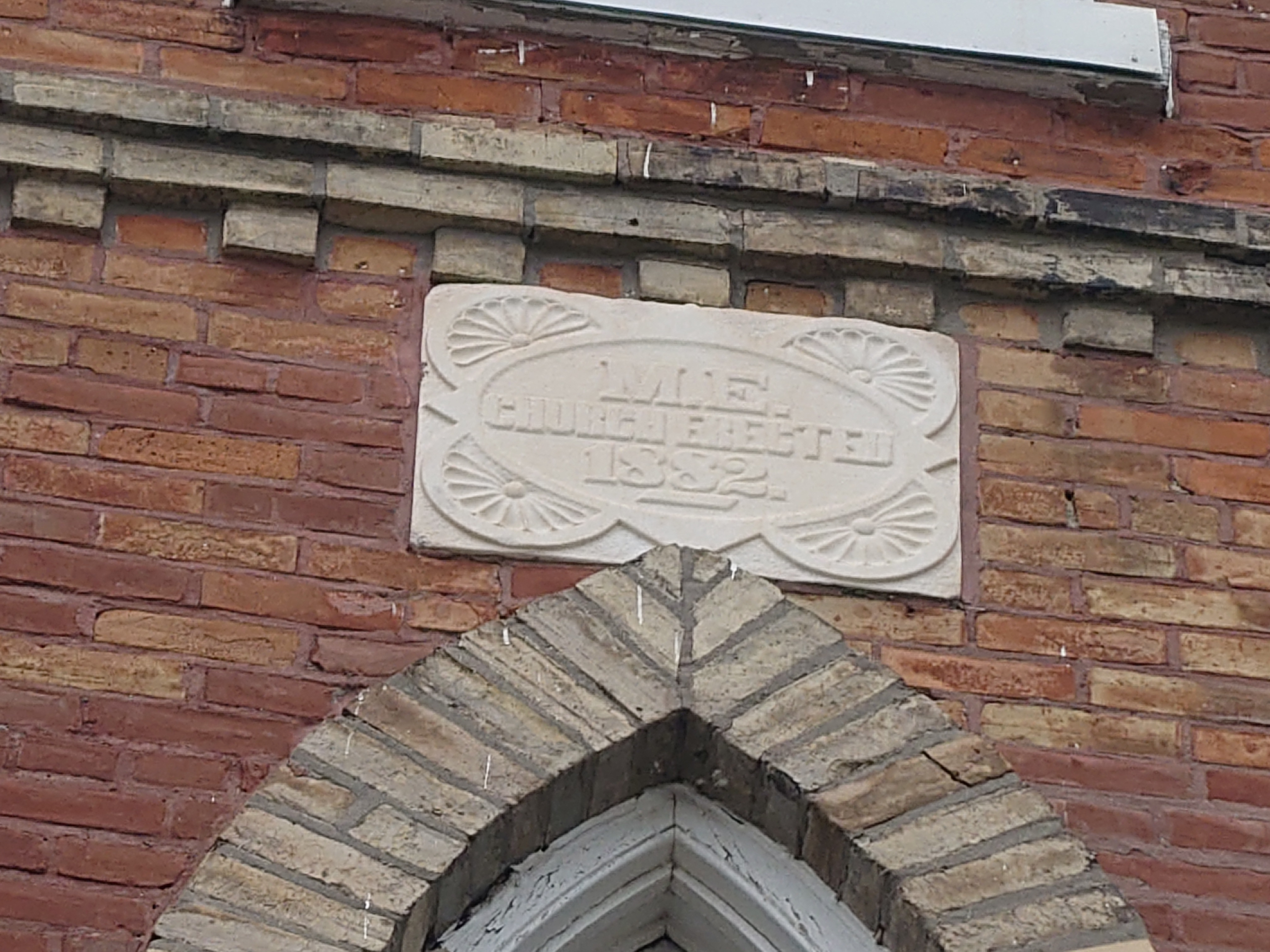
Marble plaque with the original denomination of the church and its year of construction. "M.E." stands for Methodist Episcopal.
