= Victory Church, Qormi =

Victory Church
- The Church of the Nativity of Mary
- Knisja tal-Vitorja
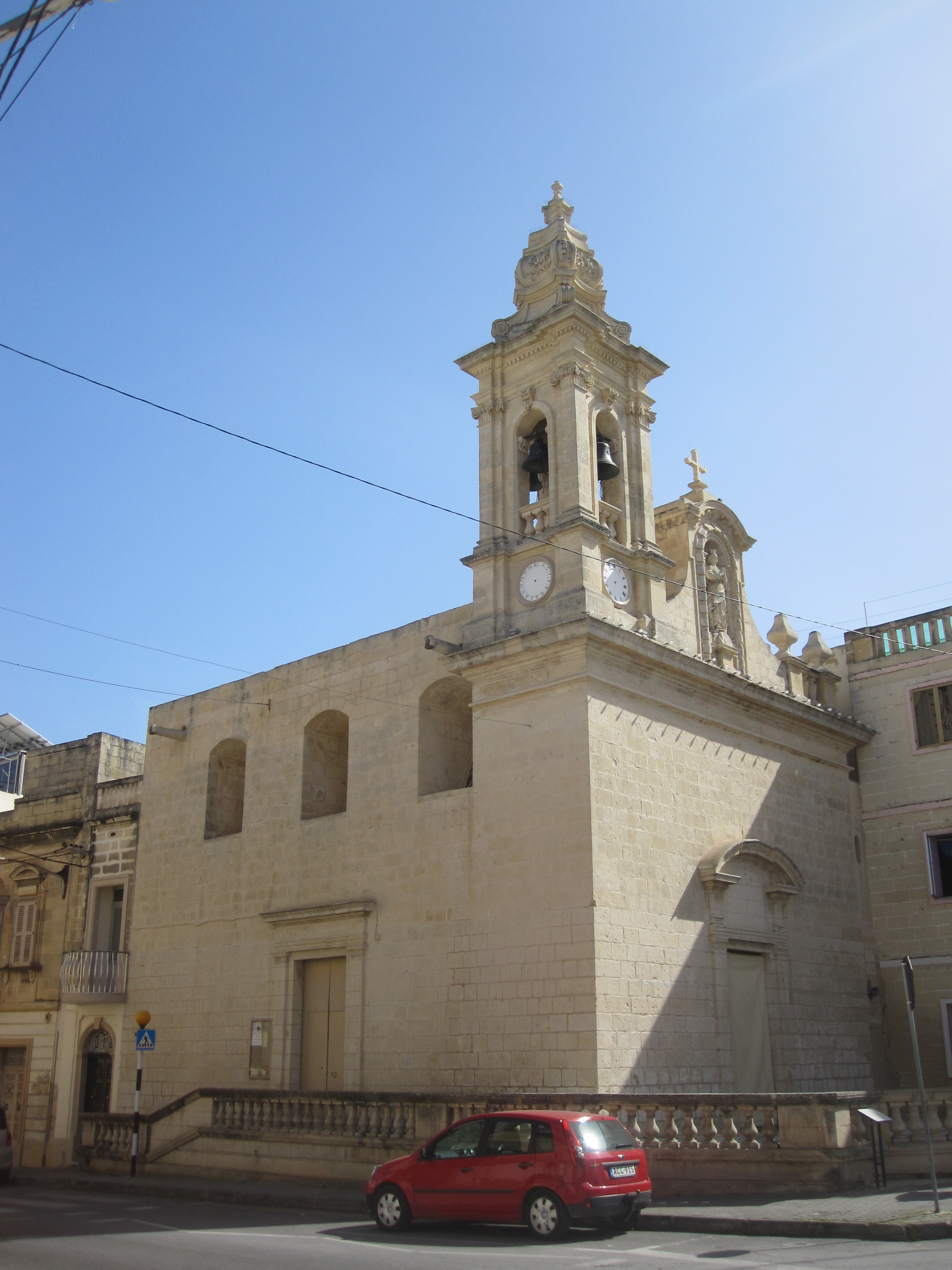

- Location within Malta
- 35°52′42″N 14°28′15″E
- Location: Qormi
- Country: Malta
- Denomination: Roman Catholic

History
- Former name: Assumption of Mary
- Status: Active
- Dedication: Nativity of Mary

Architecture
- Functional status: Church
- Completed: 17th Century

Administration
- Archdiocese: Malta
- Parish: St George's

The Church of the Nativity of Mary also known as Victory Church (Maltese: Knisja tal-Vitorja) is a Roman Catholic 17th-century church in the village of Qormi in Malta.

== Medieval church ==
The original church was built sometime during the Middle Ages. It was originally dedicated to the Assumption of Mary however it was changed sometime between 1575 and 1588 and rededicated to the Nativity of Mary, to commemorate the victory of the Great Siege of Malta. The medieval church is mentioned in inquisitor Pietro Dusina's report of 1575. He states that the church was in a state of disrepair. It had no door, lacked in all liturgical necessities, had no rector and had no means of income. At that time the church was cared for by the Cassar family, notably Jacob who seed to it that annual feast is celebrated with a Eucharist and vespers. However this was discontinued on orders of Dusina. The church was mentioned again by Bishop Baldassare Cagliares in 1615 who states that the church had 2 paintings, the main one portraying the Nativity of Mary. In 1636, Bishop Miguel Juan Balaguer Camarasa documents the presence of the same painting as mentioned by his predecessor in 1615. He also adds that the church had a cemetery. The church was deconsecrated by the same bishop in 1656.

== Present church ==
The exact date of when the present church was built is unknown however it was already standing by 1685. The church was built in a rectangular form with two doors, one facing north and the other facing west. The facade is quite plain except for the upper layer of the facade which includes some carving adoring the statue of the Immaculate conception and the adjacent belly tower, the latter being added in 1866 by Michelangelo Sapiano. The south side of the church has 3 upper windows which shed light to the interior of the church and a door way in the middle.

== Interior ==
The church has a total of 5 altars, 4 side ones and the high altar. The main painting depicts the birth of Mary and is the work of Giuseppe Cali, however due to unprofessional restoration works, the original work done by Cali is all but changed. The painting is adorned with numerous carving. The painting replaced an older one dating back to the 17th century, probably the work of Lucas Garnier. The other 4 side altars, 2 on each side, are dedicated to St Roch, St Leonard, St Paul and the Assumption of Mary. The altars were erected as a commemoration of the 4 original churches that stood in the area around the present church, which were demolished in the 16th century.
