= Cathedral of the Nativity of Christ =

Cathedral of the Nativity of Christ may refer to:

- Cathedral of the Nativity of Christ, Cairo, a Coptic Orthodox cathedral in the as-yet-unnamed New Administrative Capital, Egypt
- Cathedral of the Nativity of Christ, Riga, an Orthodox cathedral in Riga, Latvia

== See also ==
- Cathedral of the Nativity (disambiguation)
- Church of the Nativity of Christ (disambiguation)
- Nativity of Christ (disambiguation)
