= Church of the Nativity of Christ =

Church of the Nativity of Christ may refer to:

- Church of the Nativity of Christ, Pirot
- Church of the Nativity of Christ and St. Nicholas (Florence)

== See also ==
- Church of the Nativity (disambiguation)
- Cathedral of the Nativity of Christ (disambiguation)
- Nativity of Christ (disambiguation)
