= Birth of John the Baptist (disambiguation) =

The birth of John the Baptist is a biblical episode and Christian feast day.

Birth of John the Baptist may also refer to:

- The Birth of Saint John the Baptist (Artemisia Gentileschi)
- Nativity of Saint John the Baptist (Pontormo)
- Birth of John the Baptist (Signorelli)

== See also ==
- Nativity of Saint John the Baptist Church (disambiguation)
