= Cathedral of the Nativity of the Blessed Virgin Mary =

The Cathedral of the Nativity of the Blessed Virgin Mary may refer to:

== Belarus ==
- Cathedral of the Nativity of the Virgin, Hlybokaye

== China ==
- Cathedral of the Nativity of Our Lady, Macau

== Croatia ==
- Cathedral of the Nativity of the Blessed Virgin Mary (Scardona), cathedral of the former Roman Catholic Diocese of Skradin

== Ethiopia ==
- Cathedral of the Nativity of the Blessed Virgin Mary (Addis Ababa), mother church of the Ethiopian Catholic Church

== Philippines ==
- Borongan Cathedral

== Poland ==
- Cathedral Basilica of the Nativity of the Blessed Virgin Mary, Tarnów
- Co-Cathedral of the Nativity of the Blessed Virgin Mary, Żywiec

== Russia ==
- Cathedral of the Nativity of the Blessed Virgin Mary, Novosibirsk
- Rostov-on-Don Cathedral

== United States ==
- Cathedral of the Nativity of the Blessed Virgin Mary (Biloxi, Mississippi)
- Cathedral of the Nativity of the Blessed Virgin Mary (Grand Island, Nebraska)
- Cathedral of the Nativity of the Blessed Virgin Mary (Juneau, Alaska)
- Nativity of the Virgin Mary Macedonian Orthodox Cathedral (Sterling Heights, Michigan)

== See also ==
- Cathedral of the Nativity of the Theotokos (disambiguation)
- Church of the Nativity of the Blessed Virgin Mary (disambiguation)
- Cathedral of the Nativity (disambiguation)
