= Nativity of Saint John the Baptist Church =

Nativity of Saint John the Baptist Church may refer to:

== Croatia ==
- Church of the Nativity of Saint John the Baptist, Ostrovo

== Romania ==
- Church of the Nativity of Saint John the Baptist (Arad, Romania)
- Nativity of St. John the Baptist Church, Focșani
- Nativity of St. John the Baptist Church, Piatra Neamț

== Russia ==
- Chesme Church
- Ivanovsky Monastery, Pskov

== Serbia ==
- Church of the Nativity of Saint John the Baptist, Mladenovo

== See also ==
- Saint John the Baptist Church (disambiguation)
- Birth of John the Baptist (disambiguation)
- Church of the Nativity (disambiguation)
- Church of the Nativity of Mary (disambiguation)
