= Cathedral of the Nativity =

Cathedral of the Nativity, and its variants, can refer to:

Albania

- Shkodër Orthodox Cathedral (Nativity of Christ Orthodox Cathedral)

Egypt

- Cathedral of the Nativity of Christ (Cairo)

Latvia

- Nativity Cathedral, Riga

Moldova

- Nativity Cathedral, Chișinău
- Church of the Nativity, Tiraspol, also known as the Cathedral of the Birth of Christ

Russia

- Cathedral of the Nativity in Suzdal

South Africa

- Cathedral of the Holy Nativity, Pietermaritzburg

United States

- Cathedral Church of the Nativity in Bethlehem, Pennsylvania

== See also ==
- Cathedral of the Nativity of the Blessed Virgin Mary (disambiguation)
- Church of the Nativity (disambiguation)
- Church of the Nativity of the Theotokos (disambiguation)
