= Cathedral of the Nativity of the Theotokos =

Cathedral of the Nativity of the Theotokos or Cathedral of the Nativity of the Mother of God may refer to:

- Cathedral of the Nativity of the Mother of God, Košice, Slovakia
- Cathedral of the Nativity of the Most Holy Mother of God and the Holy Royal Martyrs, London, England, United Kingdom
- Cathedral of the Nativity of the Theotokos, Rostov-on-Don, Russia
- Cathedral of the Nativity of the Theotokos, Sarajevo, Bosnia and Herzegovina
- Cathedral of the Nativity of the Theotokos, Suzdal, Russia
- Cathedral of the Nativity of the Mother of God (Toronto), Canada
- Cathedral of the Nativity of the Theotokos, Ufa, Russia

== See also ==
- Church of the Nativity of the Theotokos (disambiguation)
- Cathedral of the Nativity of the Blessed Virgin Mary (disambiguation)
- Church of the Nativity of the Blessed Virgin Mary (disambiguation)
- Church of the Nativity (disambiguation)
- Church of the Dormition of the Theotokos (disambiguation)
