= Ostrovo, Croatia =

Ostrovo Острово (Serbian)
- Village (Selo)
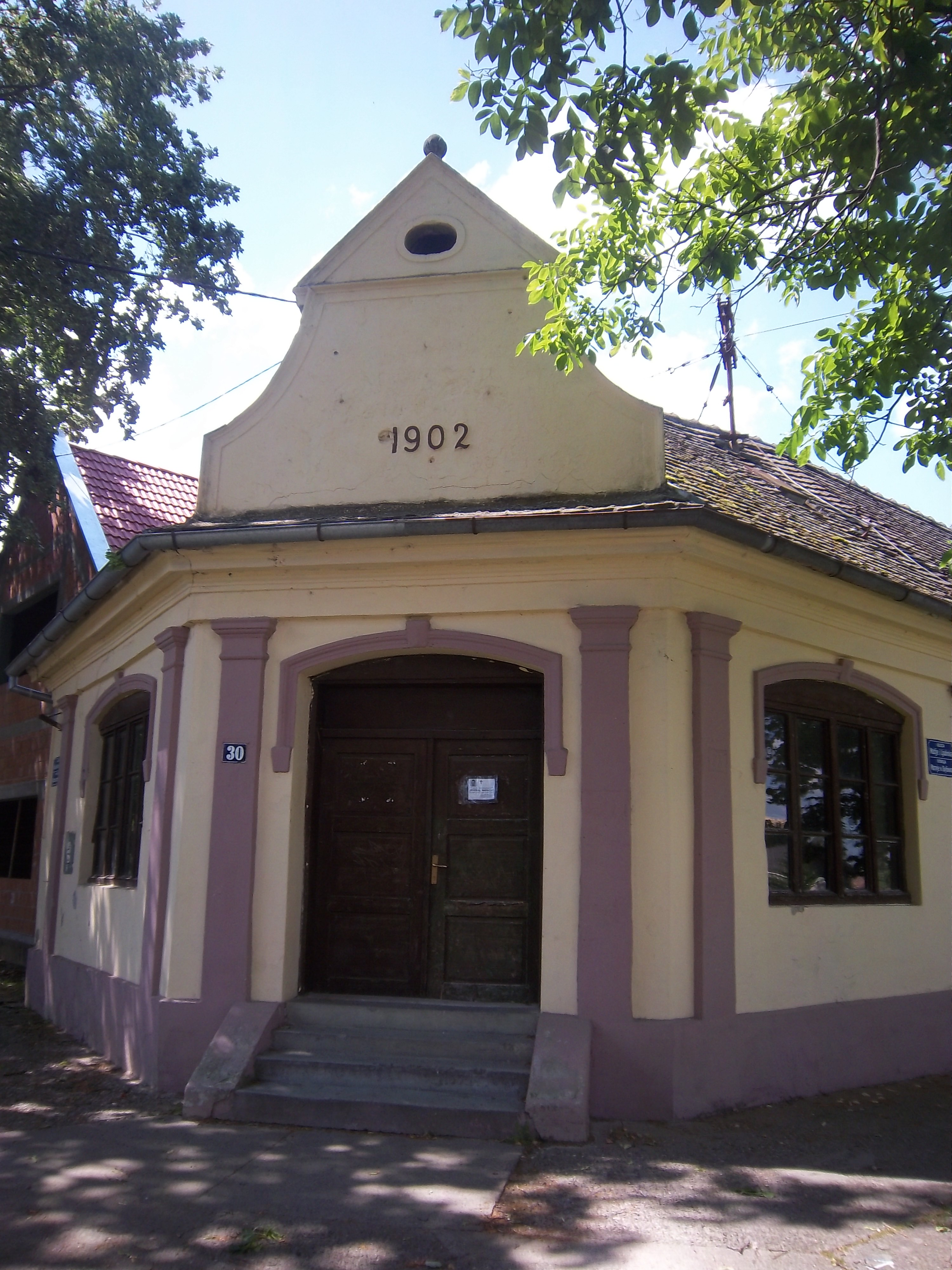
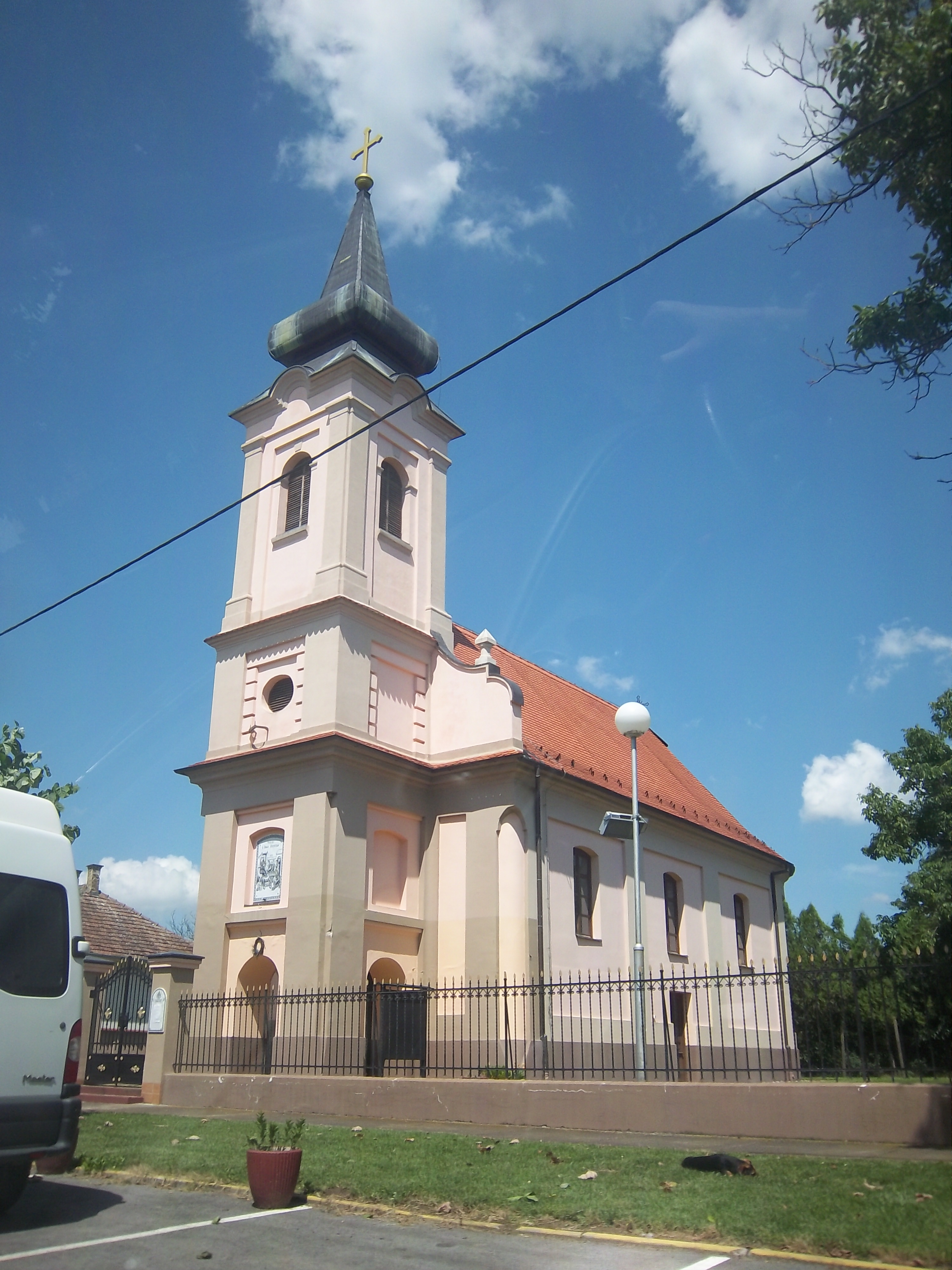
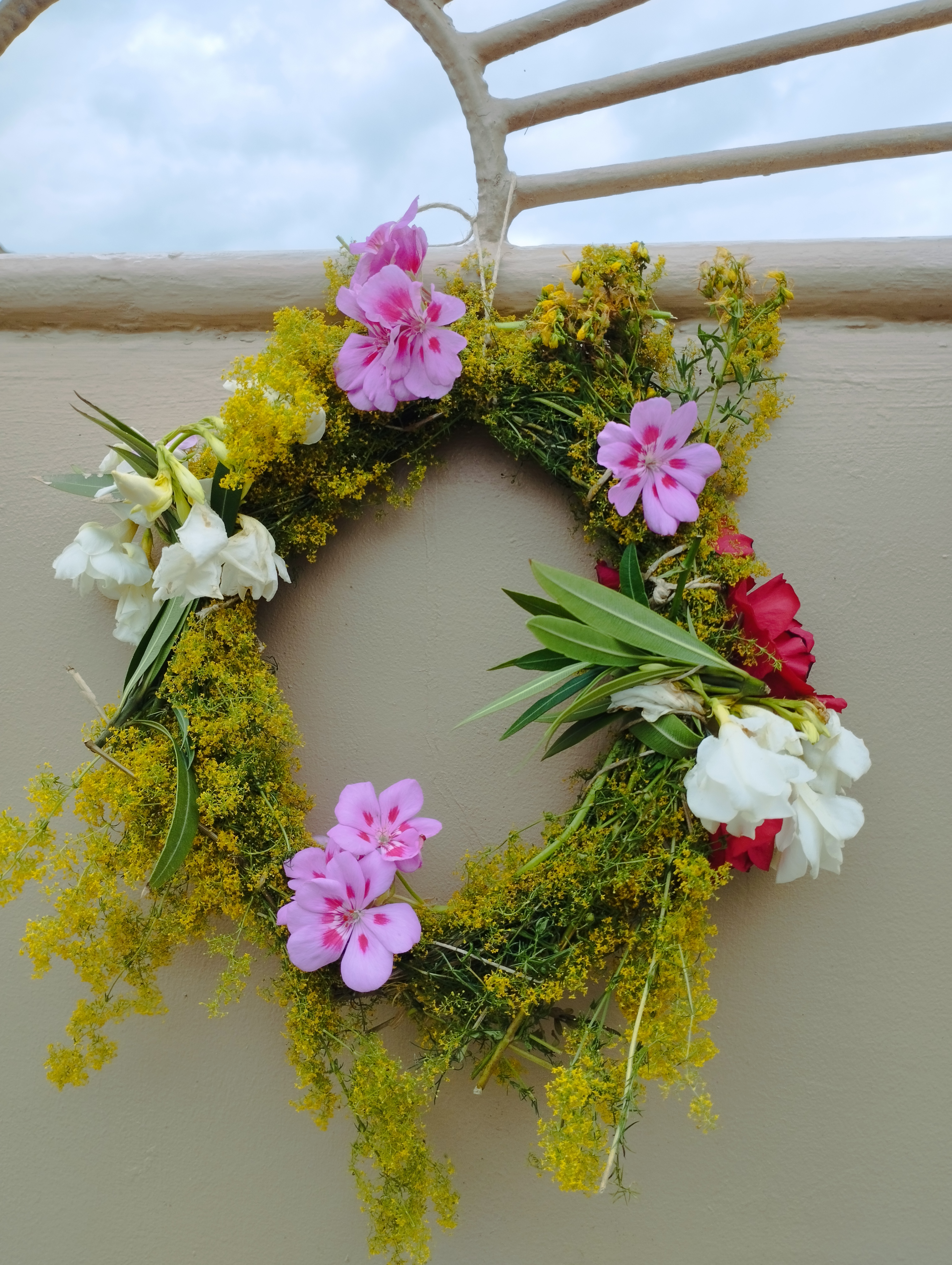
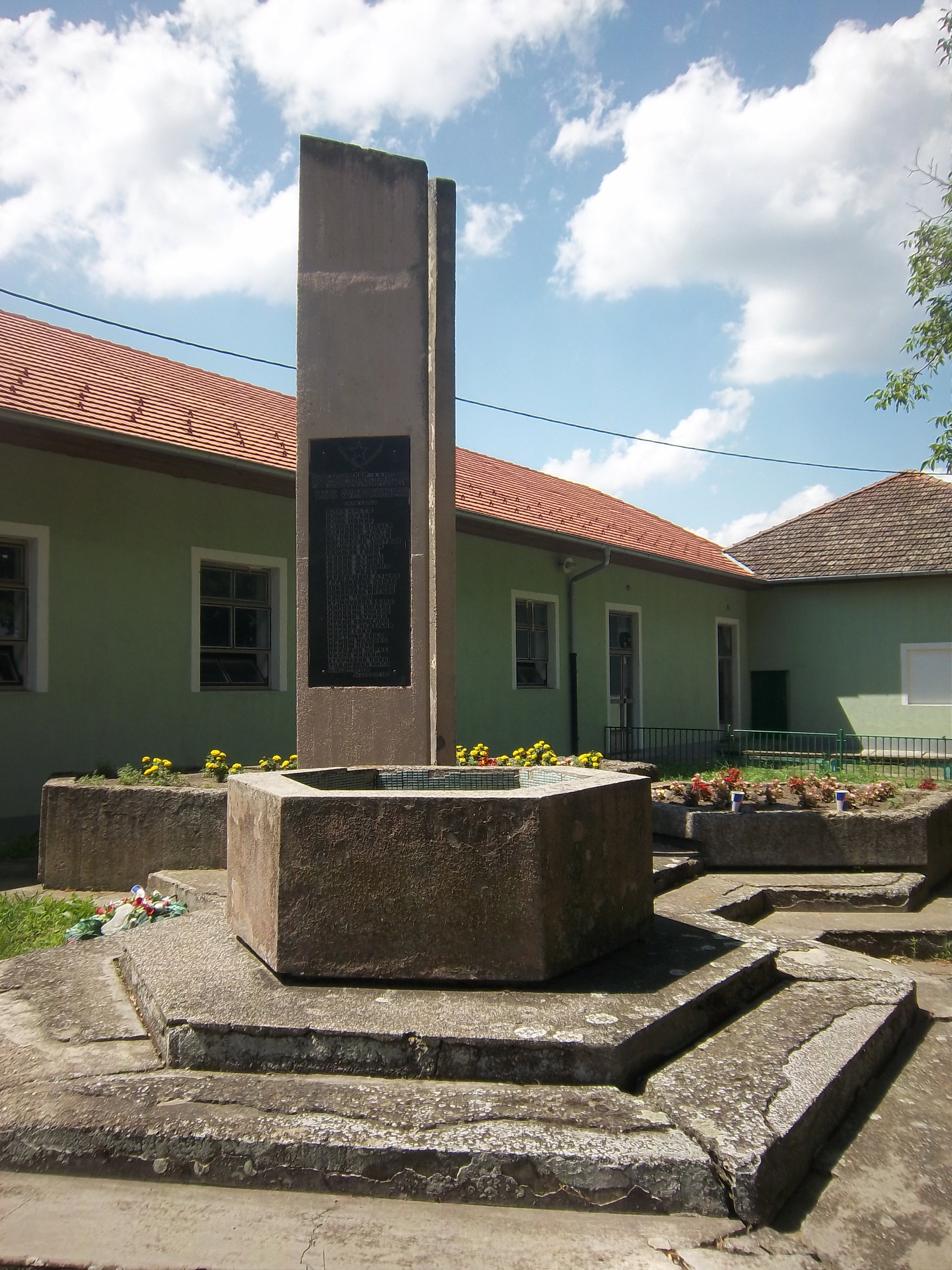
- Early 20 century municipal house built for the former Ostrovo Municipality Church of the Nativity of Saint John the Baptist, Ostrovo Galium verum Midsummer wreath World War II memorial

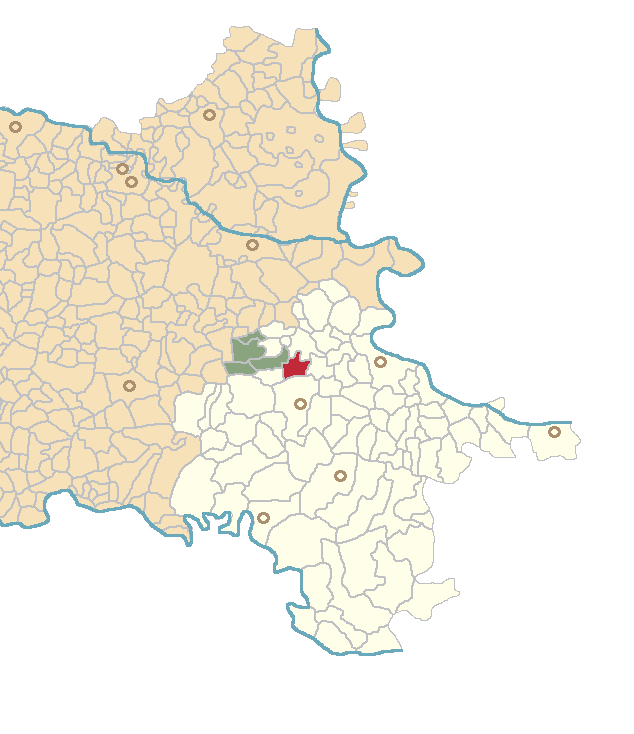

- Location within Vukovar-Syrmia County Location within Croatia Location within Europe
- Coordinates: 45.338°N 18.787°E
- Country: Croatia
- Region: Slavonia (Podunavlje)
- County: Vukovar-Syrmia
- Municipality: Markušica

Government
  - Body: Local Committee

Area
  - Total: 16.3 km^{2} (6.3 sq mi)

Population (2021)
  - Total: 408
  - Density: 25.0/km^{2} (64.8/sq mi)
- Time zone: UTC+1 (CET)
- Vehicle registration: VK
- Official languages: Croatian, Serbian

Ostrovo (Serbian Cyrillic: Острово, Hungarian: Lászlófalva) is a village located in the Municipality of Markušica, within Vukovar-Syrmia County, eastern Croatia. Situated on the borderlands between historical regions of Slavonia and Syrmia, it spans an area of 16.3 km² and had a population of 408 as of the 2021 census.

Historically, Ostrovo has been inhabited since prehistoric times, with archaeological evidence pointing to Iron Age settlements. During the Middle Ages, the village was part of Valkó County and later came under Ottoman control. Following the Treaty of Karlowitz in 1699, the village was incorporated into the Habsburg Monarchy. Ostrovo was strongly affected by both World War II and the Croatian War of Independence. During the former, the village endured occupation and the deportation of residents to the Jasenovac concentration camp. In the latter, it was part of the self-proclaimed Serb entity of SAO Eastern Slavonia, Baranja and Western Syrmia before being peacefully reintegrated into Croatia under UNTAES administration after the signing of the 1995 Erdut Agreement.

Today, Ostrovo is a rural settlement with a predominantly Serb population.

== History ==
=== Prehistoric period and Classical antiquity ===
Archaeological evidence indicates the presence of prehistoric settlements from the Iron Age in the area. These localities were first recorded in the 19th century and later during the 20th century documented by the Vinkovci City Museum. However, no systematic excavations have been undertaken.

=== Middle Ages ===
Ostrovo was first mentioned in 1381 as a ruined town, leading historians to speculate that it was initially established during the existence of Valkó County. During the medieval period, it was a typical of swampland castle of the area. Before the Ottoman conquest, the surrounding land was owned by Benedictine monks, with nearby settlements such as Laslovo, Eginci, and Čakanovci forming part of the Ostrovo property. The village was abandoned during the Ottoman invasions but was repopulated in the 16th and 17th centuries by Eastern Orthodox settlers from the Balkans.

=== After the 1699 Treaty of Karlowitz ===
Following the 1699 Treaty of Karlowitz, the Lordship of Nuštar was established, and the village became part of its domain. A census conducted in 1736 recorded 40 predominantly Eastern Orthodox households. That same year, a peasant uprising erupted across the Nuštar Castle estates, including Ostrovo. The Osijek Military Command negotiated with the peasants, who selected a three-member delegation—Ignjat Marić from Jarmina, Stojan Cvetković from Ostrovo, and Đuro Vuković from Cerić—to present their grievances in writing.

By 1866, the village had a population of 629 residents living in 105 houses, with the majority belonging to the Eastern Orthodox Serb or Vlach communities. The Vinkovci–Osijek railway line, including a local train station, was inaugurated in 1901, improving connectivity with both cities. In 1911, Ostrovo residents successfully petitioned for separation from the Nuštar Municipality, and the independent Ostrovo Municipality was established in 1912. Many male residents were conscripted into the Austro-Hungarian army during World War I.

=== Kingdom of Yugoslavia ===
In 1926, Ostrovo established a local peasant reading room, followed by the formation of an agricultural association in 1929. A firefighters’ unit began operations in 1936, and a post office opened in 1937, though it closed during World War II in Yugoslavia.

After the formation of the Banovina of Croatia, representatives from Ostrovo’s Serbian Orthodox parish participated in drafting the Vukovar resolution, which advocated for the region to be transferred to the Danube Banovina. The Croat community publication Hrvatski list from Vukovar claimed at the time that Serb mayors from Ostrovo and ten neighboring villages supported remaining within the Banovina of Croatia, a claim denied by the Vinkovci-based Serb publication Slavonija subsequently together with signatures of the mentioned mayors. The article in Slavonija denied that the meeting between mayors and Sava Kosanović of the Independent Democratic Party at which alleged support for the inclusion into the new Banovina of Croatia ever took place.

=== World War II ===
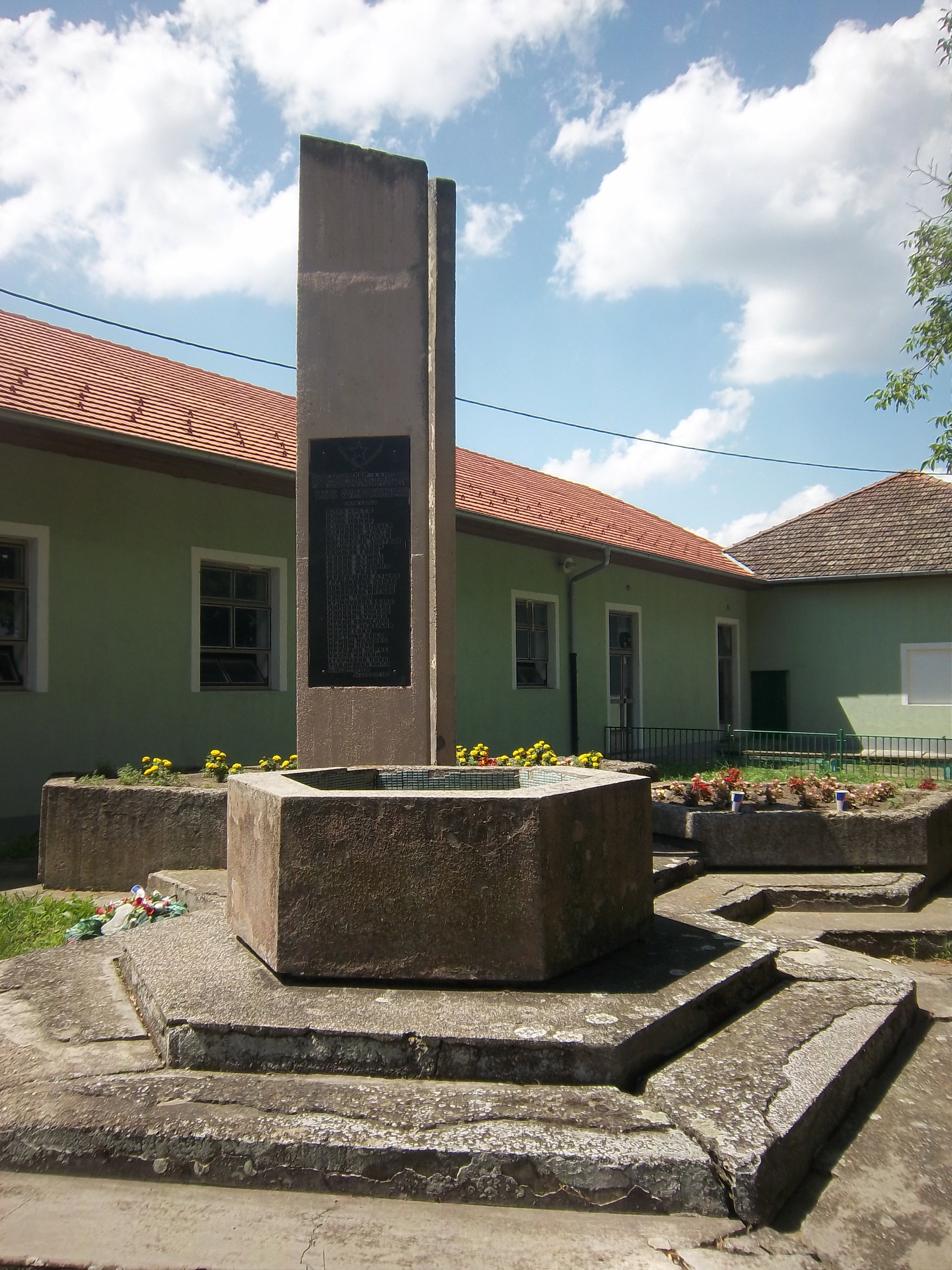
World War II memorial

During World War II in Yugoslavia the village, like many others in the region, experienced significant upheaval under the regime of the Independent State of Croatia, a Nazi-aligned puppet state. The NDH's Genocide of Serbs in the Independent State of Croatia and Romani Holocaust led to widespread atrocities, including the deportation of Ostrovo residents to the Jasenovac concentration camp as early as 1941. Among the 52 victims from Ostrovo recorded in Jasenovac Concentration Camp, 26 were Serbs, 22 were Roma, and 4 were of unspecified ethnicity.

In 1942, a local teacher, Vasa Dobrić, noted the emergence of Yugoslav Partisan resistance in the area, though specific details remain scarce. By 1943, increasing numbers of villagers joined the Partisan movement, with 51 new recruits that year alone. The formation of the Local National Liberation Committee in June 1943 further mobilized the community in resistance efforts. The German military conducted operations to suppress local resistance. In July 1943, Nazi forces destroyed agricultural machinery, including threshers, across several villages, including Ostrovo. Earlier that summer, a raid on June 26 marked the first wave of intimidation in the village. In 1944, the Ustaše regime planned a massacre in Ostrovo during Orthodox Easter, but the intervention of local Croatian villagers from Nuštar prevented the attack. Later that year, in July, 24 individuals brought from a concentration camp were executed in Ostrovo. Another raid occurred in January 1945, leading to the arrest of numerous villagers accused of aiding the Partisans. In April 1945, as the NDH regime was collapsing, these detainees were taken to Zagreb, where they were executed.

Ostrovo became a strategic point during the final stages of the war. The village was part of the defensive line held by the 3rd Ustaše Home Guard Division and the 1232nd Regiment of the 41st German Infantry Division to protect their position in Vinkovci. On April 13, 1945, Yugoslav Partisans launched an offensive to liberate Vinkovci. A battalion of the 4th Brigade from the 21st Division was deployed to Ostrovo to secure the rear. While Vinkovci fell by 6 p.m., German forces in Ostrovo continued to resist until 11 p.m., when the village was finally liberated. By the end of the war, over 100 residents of Ostrovo had served in the Partisans, with 30 killed in action. Civilian casualties ranged from 77 to 83.

=== Socialist Yugoslavia ===
During the Socialist Federal Republic of Yugoslavia, Ostrovo underwent significant infrastructural and social changes, although some developments lagged behind neighboring villages. In 1957, under the initiative of local resident Duja Cvetković, the village embarked on an electrification project. After six months of work, on November 2, Ostrovo celebrated the installation of electric lighting with a large event at the local school attended by 200 guests. The village was decorated with 2,500 small flags to mark the occasion. In 1965, community contributions funded the construction of a two-kilometre concrete pathway within the village, costing five million Yugoslav dinar. That same year, another concrete path, more than two kilometres long, was built to connect Ostrovo with the nearby village of Tordinci. During the 1960s, the local post office was equipped with telephone services, providing direct connections to the rest of Yugoslavia. Residents of Tordinci relied on Ostrovo’s post office as well for their telephone needs.

The construction of a community center began in 1948 but progressed unusually slowly due to property issues with Vinkovci Agricultural Cooperative (PIK Vinkovci), with completion not achieved until the 1970s. Similarly, the village was late in establishing a water supply network, with work starting in 1984 and continuing into 1985. The system was inaugurated only on April 13, 1987, coinciding with the anniversary of the village’s liberation during World War II. Ostrovo’s railway station, which had handled both passenger and cargo traffic, ceased accepting cargo shipments on May 22, 1966, limiting its operations to passenger services thereafter.

Despite infrastructural advancements, political organization in Ostrovo during this period remained weak. In 1956, Vinkovačke Novosti highlighted the limited presence and influence of local Communist Party of Croatia members in Vukovar, Mirkovci, Ostrovo, and Cerić. By 1957, only 23 Ostrovo residents were party members.

=== Croatian War of Independence ===
During the Croatian War of Independence, Ostrovo was within the self-proclaimed Serb entity of SAO Eastern Slavonia, Baranja and Western Syrmia. In the war's final stages, the United Nations oversaw the peaceful reintegration of the region into Croatian jurisdiction and governed the region as an UN protectorate between 1996 and 1998 via the United Nations Transitional Administration for Eastern Slavonia, Baranja and Western Sirmium.

== Geography ==
The village of Ostrovo have the lowest average altitude amongst the settlements of Markušica Municipality of 86 m above the sea level.

== Demographic ==
According to the 1991 census, the village was inhabited by a majority of Serbs (85.18%), and minority of Croats (7.91%) and Yugoslavs (4.29%).

Ostrovo: Population trends 1857–2021
v

population	629	702	678	739	771	746	731	897	762	849	924	1040	938	884	760	612	408
	1857	1869	1880	1890	1900	1910	1921	1931	1948	1953	1961	1971	1981	1991	2001	2011	2021

Sources: Croatian Bureau of Statistics publications

== Languages ==
=== Serbian language ===
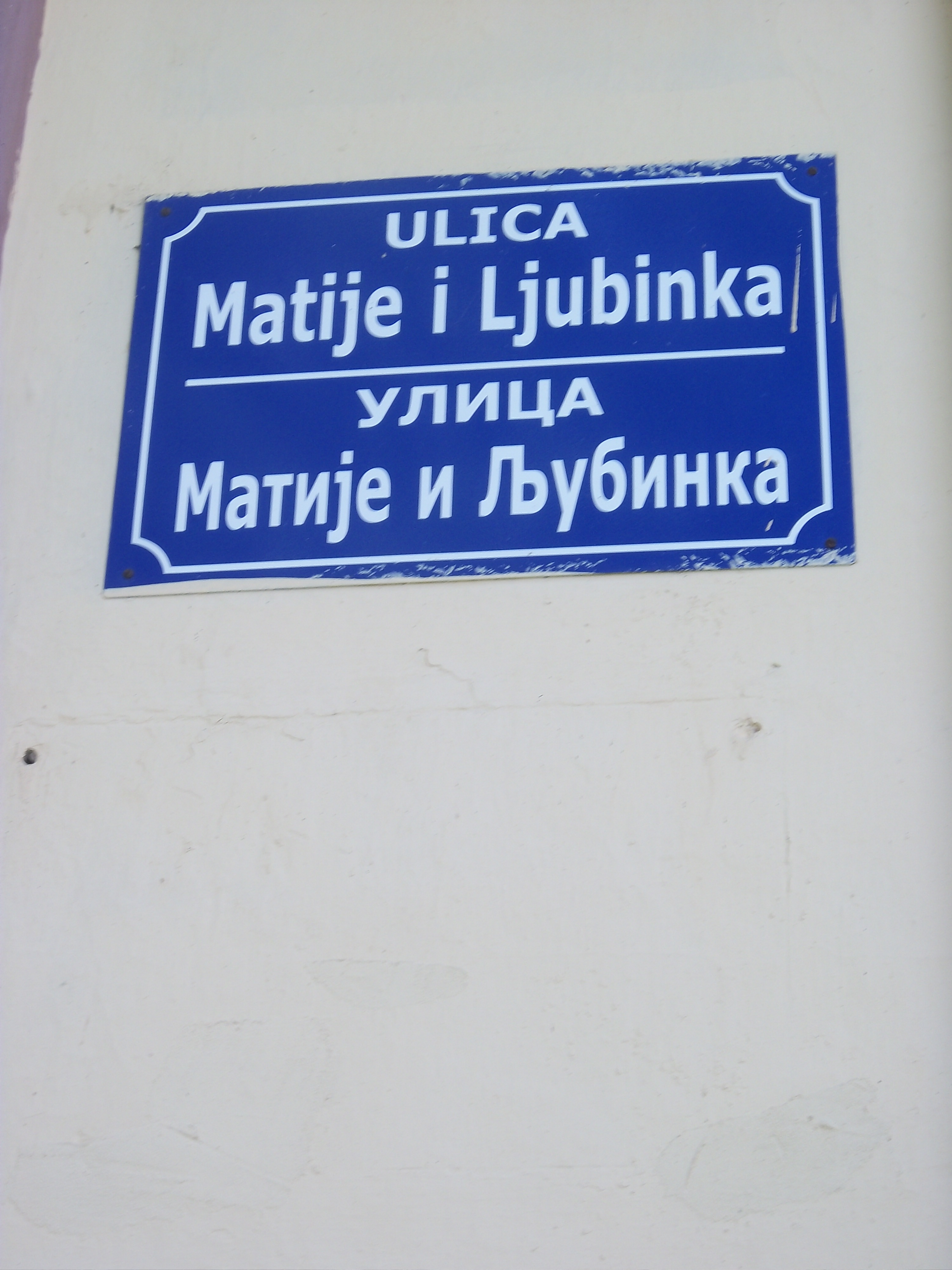
Street names in Gaj's Latin and Serbian Cyrillic alphabet

Serbian Language and Serbian Cyrillic alphabet is the second official language in the Municipality of Markušica alongside the Croatian language which is official at the national level. Both Serbian and Croatian language are standardized varieties of the pluricentric Serbo-Croatian language.

According to the Municipal Statute, individuals who are members of the Serbian national minority are ensured the freedom of expression of national belonging and freedom to use their language and script in public and private use on the whole territory of the Municipality of Markušica including Ostrovo. According to the municipal Statute, bilingual signs of the same font are used for written traffic signs and other written traffic markings, street and squares names and names of settlement and geographical localities on the entire territory of the Municipality. Equal public use of Serbian language is required on the basis of the Constitutional Act on the Rights of National Minorities in the Republic of Croatia and relevant national laws and the country is a party to the European Charter for Regional or Minority Languages.

=== Other languages ===
While only Croatian and Serbian enjoy official status, other languages were historically present and important in the region with some of them remaining in limited use up to the present day.

== Education ==
The history of education in Ostrovo is marked by conflicting reports and delayed development. Early records do not provide a clear timeline for the establishment of a school in the village. In July 1788, local educator Stefan Vujanovski reported on the state of education in the Zagreb district, mentioning schools in Markušica and Pačetin but omitting Ostrovo. Similarly, the 1797 census of Slaveno-Serbian schools in Syrmia does not list Ostrovo, casting doubt on Rudolf Horvat's claim that the village had a school in 1789. Horvat also stated that 43 boys and 27 girls attended school in Ostrovo in 1857, but this is disputed by the village’s school chronicle, which notes that the initiative to establish a school began in 1862. Despite these discrepancies, residents celebrated 125 years of education in Ostrovo in 1987, tracing its beginnings to 1862. Detailed documentation became available only in the 1890s with the establishment of the local school chronicle.

The school’s early years were marked by poor conditions. During the 1893/94 school year, the teacher reported unsanitary facilities. By 1897/98, another teacher described the school as resembling a dilapidated manor rather than a centre of education. In 1923, the small school building was declared unstable, with warnings that it might collapse on students. By 1928/29, overcrowding necessitated split shifts with incomplete timetables. The situation worsened in 1934/35, when classes moved to the Serbian Church Community Hall due to the original building’s uninhabitable state.

A new school building was constructed just before the outbreak of World War II in 1940. However, the war disrupted education, with the occupying forces taking over the school building. After the war, accelerated courses were organized for students who missed schooling during the occupation, along with literacy courses for adults. In January 1961, the Ostrovo school became a branch of the Fifth Elementary School in Vinkovci. Efforts in the 1980s aimed to consolidate the schools in Ostrovo, Gaboš, and Antin under the administration of the Markušica school, but in 1981, Ostrovo’s school was affiliated with Vladimir Nazor Elementary School in Vinkovci. The school building underwent renovations in 1987.

Today, the school in Ostrovo operates as a branch of the Elementary School of Markušica, which is part of the network of Serbian-language schools in the Podunavlje region. Following the end of the Croatian War of Independence and the signing of the Erdut Agreement, education in the area was organized to accommodate the needs of the local Serb minority community, with instruction conducted in Serbian language and with curriculum including Serbian history, art and culture.

== See also ==
- Markušica Municipality

== Sources ==
- Veljko Maksić; Nebojša Vidović (2022). Сведоци времена: историјски преглед развоја села Остеова [Witnesees of Time: Historical Review of the Development of the Ostrovo Village] (in Serbian (Cyrillic script)). Vukovar: Joint Council of Municipalities. ISBN 978-953-8489-02-0.
