= Vukovar resolution =

Vukovar resolution was the document in which Serbs from Vukovar and neighboring communities, at the end of 1939, requested from central Yugoslav government exemption of Vukovar county from the Banovina of Croatia and its annexation to the Danube Banovina or future Banovina of Serbia.

== Political circumstances ==
With Cvetković-Maček agreement, Banovina of Croatia was created from Sava Banovina, Littoral Banovina, and parts of Vrbas Banovina, Drina Banovina and Zeta Banovina The new creation included large number of areas in which Croats weren't ethnic majority (i.e. were Serbs where ethnic majority), or areas that weren't earlier part of the Croatian state (Prevlaka, Dubrovnik and western Srem). This turn of events provoked outcry in part of the Serbian people because the creation of Banovina of Croatia didn't resolve the so-called Serbian issue. Protests followed, mostly organized or incited by Serbian Cultural Club which demanded revision of Cvetković-Maček agreement, that is, border revision of the newly formed Banovina of Croatia. Serbian Cultural Club claimed that the agreement wasn't signed by all Serb representatives but was in fact the result of bargain struck between the crown and representatives of CPP.

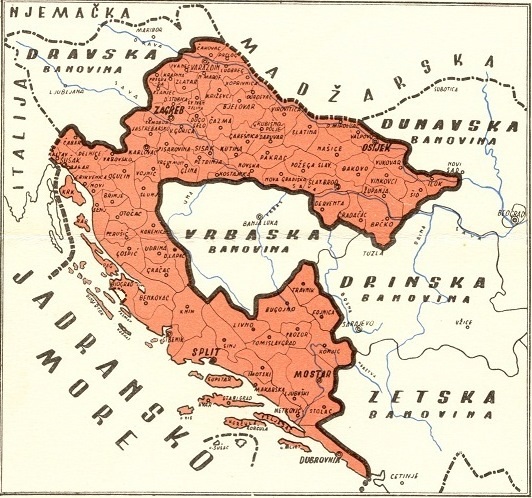
Map of Banovina of Croatia, 1939

Through its newspaper, the "Serbian Voice", Serbian Cultural Club, by means of different articles presented opinion on necessity of Serb political autonomy in Banovina of Croatia (in 19 of counties where Serbs were absolute or relative majority) or alternatively, separation from Banovina of Croatia and addition to other Banovina level units that were to enter Banovina of Serbia later on.

To implement this, Serbian Cultural Club formed its subcommittees on territory of east Slavonija, Srem, Bosanska Posavina and in the final months of 1939. started collecting signatures for separation of Ilok, Šid and Vukovar county from Banovina of Croatia.

== Historical, geographical and other resolution reasons ==
=== Historical reasons ===
As main reasons for the resolution, the document itself names the historical reasons:

"For many years, Vukovar was the seat of the Syrmia County. Together with Banat and Bačka, Syrmia forms Serbian Vojvodina. This is irrefutable, because even the national spirit attests to it through song "Syrmia, Banat and Bačka, the three courageous hearts". We had Serb majority in Vukovar county for several centuries now. Different sources confirm this; for example, one modern German writer from the first half of 18th century says: "Orthodox believers built their church in 1731. for which 50.000 bricks were requested from local nobility. Their requests were easily met for they made the majority of county population and their religion was tolerated as they already had one older church in Vukovar. Furthermore, they benefited from poor demand for the landowner brick.

Summoned by Syrmia-Karlovci metropolitan Vikentije Jovanović, Russians teachers arrived to educate the Serbian youth and one of those teachers stayed in Sremski Karlovci while others leave for Belgrade and Vukovar, so they can find schools there. The fact that in 1733. Timitej Levandovski went to Vukovar and started a Serbian school shows how, even then, Vukovar represented a strong Serbian cultural center. It remained as such through history to the present day. Vukovar gave the first Serbian journalist and polyglot, Zaharije Stefanović Orfelin, predecessor to the Dositej Obradović.

"Dobra Voda", Vukovar picnic resort, where most notable Serbs from Syrmia regularly gathered near the little church of St.Paraskeva, was where Branko Radičević found inspiration for his poems. Svetozar Miletić, returning from Vac, first stops by in Vukovar to visit the Serbian political centar of Syrmia. These examples are not unique, many others can be added to the list. Cultural and educational Serbian societies even today mention Vukovar Serbs action."

=== Geographical reasons ===
According to the signatures of the resolution, Vukovar, in economic sense "absolutely and solely gravitates towards Novi Sad and creates one economic unit with Syrmia...Only applicable authority in matters of price regulation of commercial goods on Vukovar market is the stock exchange of Novi Sad. The only place where a farmer from Vukovar county can buy his tools is Novi Sad. The economic structure of the Vukovar county is identical with that of Danbue Banovina.

=== Political reasons ===
Signatories of the resolution stated that Vukovar has always a single political whole with rest of the Syrmia, that is, Danube Banovine back then: "Croats and their political parties didn't once win an election majority in this county, therefore neither was the political representative theirs. During the campaign for the political reorganization of the country, it was requested from the Croats that they honor specific historical individuality. If this individuality was to be taken into an account, Vukovar could be added to the Vojvodina".

Likewise, it was stated that according to the census from 1931. Vukovar county had 51.334 citizens. 26.342 were Serbs, 11.893 were Croats while the rest consisted of national minorities (Germans, Hungarians, Russians/Rusyns, Czechs, Slovaks, Jews...), therefore, Vukovar county, as an area populated mostly with Serbs had no reason or basis to remain part of Banovina of Croatia.

== Signatories ==
Initiators and authors of the resolution were Marko R. Bingulac and Marko Lj. Bugarski. As such, they were mentioned as first signatories of the resolution. Afterwards followed signatures by representatives of Serbian Orthodox Church municipalities:

- for Serbian Church municipality of Vukovar, signatories were its president Teodor Selaković, Cvetko Bingulac and archpriest Jovan Kozobarić,
- for Serbian Church municipality of Borovo, priest Bogdan Dejanović, archpriest Đurica Skakić and vice-president Milan Buzaretić,
- for Serbian Church municipality of Gaboš signatories were its president, Andrija Ćelić and the priest Milan Petović,
- for Serbian Church municipality of Trpinja, president Jovo Palić and priest Spasoje Vukotić
- for Serbian Church municipality of Markušica, president Mladen Petrović,
- for Serbian Church municipality of Vera, president and priest, Đuro Mašić,
- for Serbian Church municipality of Negoslavci, president Radovan Crnjanski and priest Petar Ostojić,
- for Serbian Church municipality of Bobota, president Miloš Maletić and priest Đuro Mašić,
- for Serbian Church municipality of Pačetin, president Dimitrije Crnogorac and priest Nikolaj Semčenko,
- for Serbian Church municipality of Bršadin, its president Živko Simić and priest Đorđe Mišić,
- for Serbian Church municipality of Mikluševci and Čakovci, priest Kiprijan Relić and Kosta Anđelić,
- for Serbian Church municipality of Ostrovo, president Milan Vučevac and priest Dušan Blidović,
- for Serbian Church municipality of Marinci, priest Vasilije Lengenfelder and president Nikola Živanović,
- for Serbian Church municipality of Opatovac and Sotin, archpriest Emilijan Josifović and president Milivoj Kekić,
- for Serbian Church municipality of Palača, priest Borisav Božić and president Dušan Petojević

== See also ==
- Serbs of Vukovar
