= Robert Pflug =

Baltic German architect (1832–1885)

- Born: Robert August Pflug; 1 May 1832; Saint Petersburg, Russian Empire
- Died: 30 November 1885 (aged 53); Riga, Russian Empire
- Known for: Architecture
- Movement: Eclecticism,

Robert Pflug (Latvian: Roberts Pflūgs; 1 May 1832 – 30 November 1885) was a Baltic German architect.

Robert August Pflug was born in Saint Petersburg as the son of a merchant. He studied at the Technological Institute in Saint Petersburg between 1846 and 1850 and thereafter at the Imperial Academy of Arts. In 1860 he went on a study trip to Germany and Italy. From 1862 he worked as an architect in Riga, the present-day capital of Latvia, and was a teacher at the Riga Polytechnic Institute (today Riga Technical University) from 1869 to 1875.

Buildings designed by Pflug in Riga include Nativity Cathedral, the House of the Livonian Noble Corporation (designed together with Jānis Frīdrihs Baumanis and Otto von Sievers, today the Latvian parliament, the Saeima), and the Szczytt House, built for Justynian Niemirowicz-Szczytt (1814–1894) and now the building of the Finnish embassy.

== Gallery ==
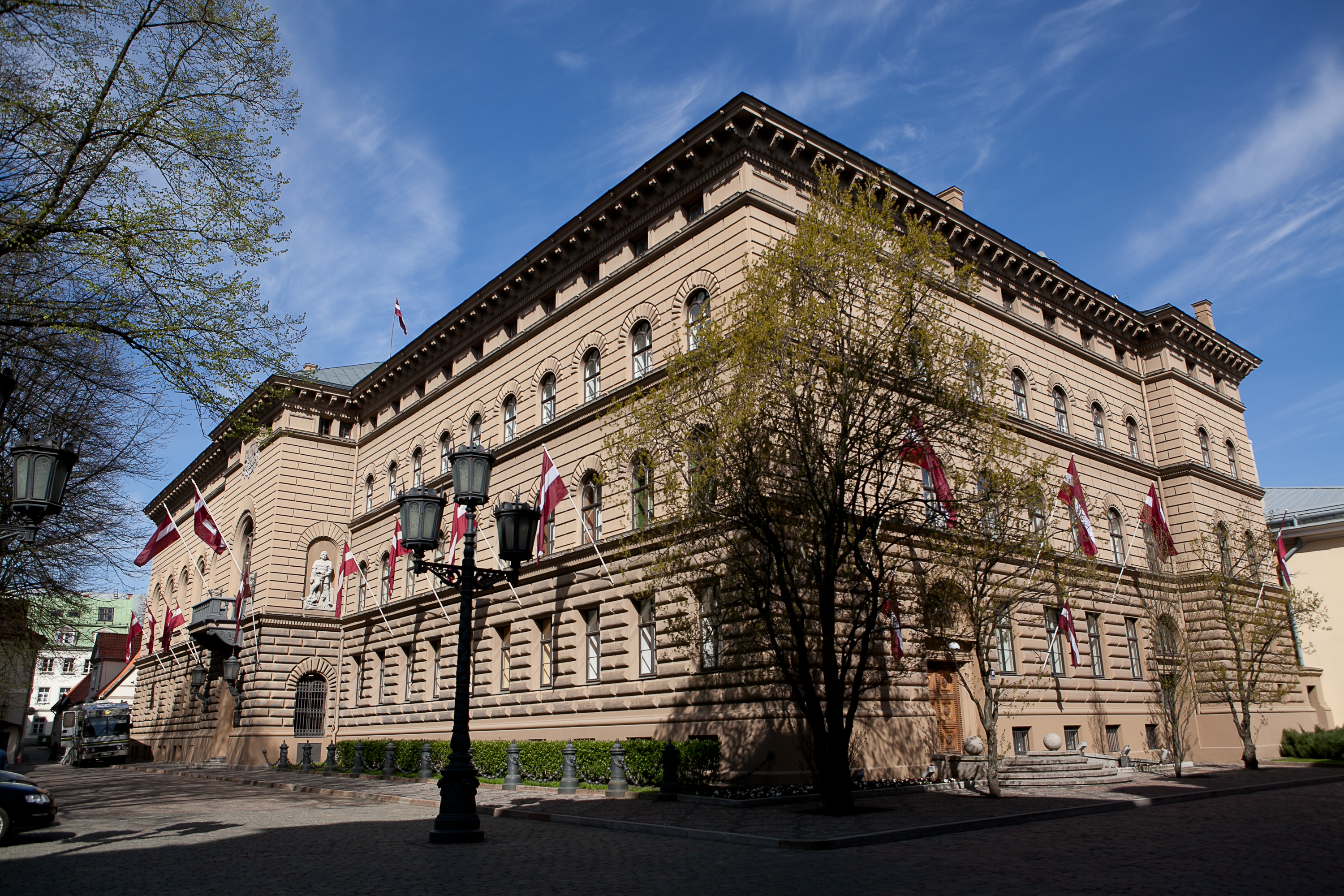
The House of the Livonian Noble Corporation in Riga (now the Latvian parliament, the Saeima)

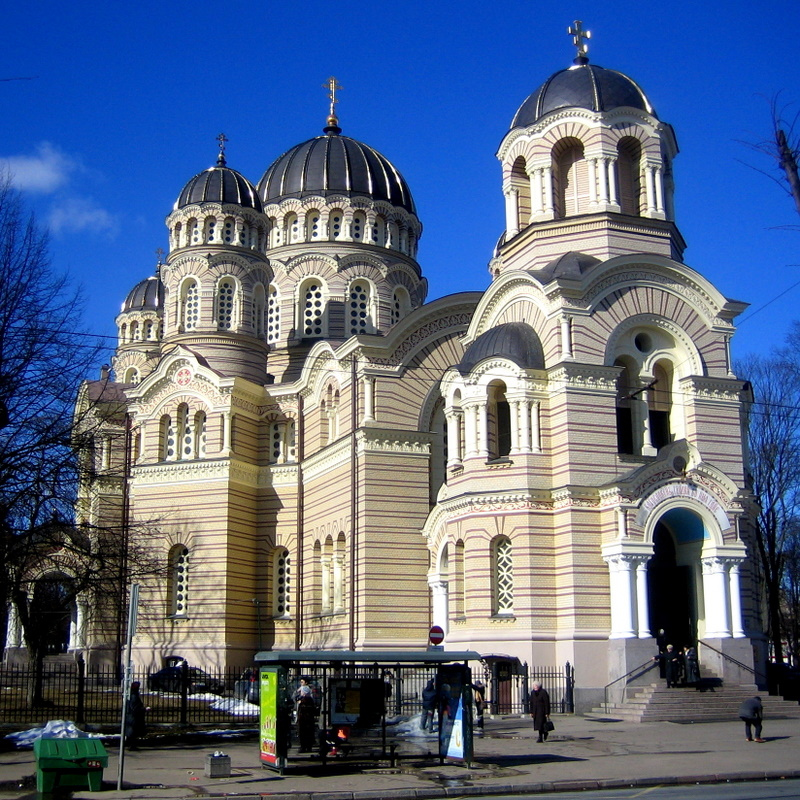
Nativity Cathedral at Brīvības Boulevard 23, Riga (1876–1884)

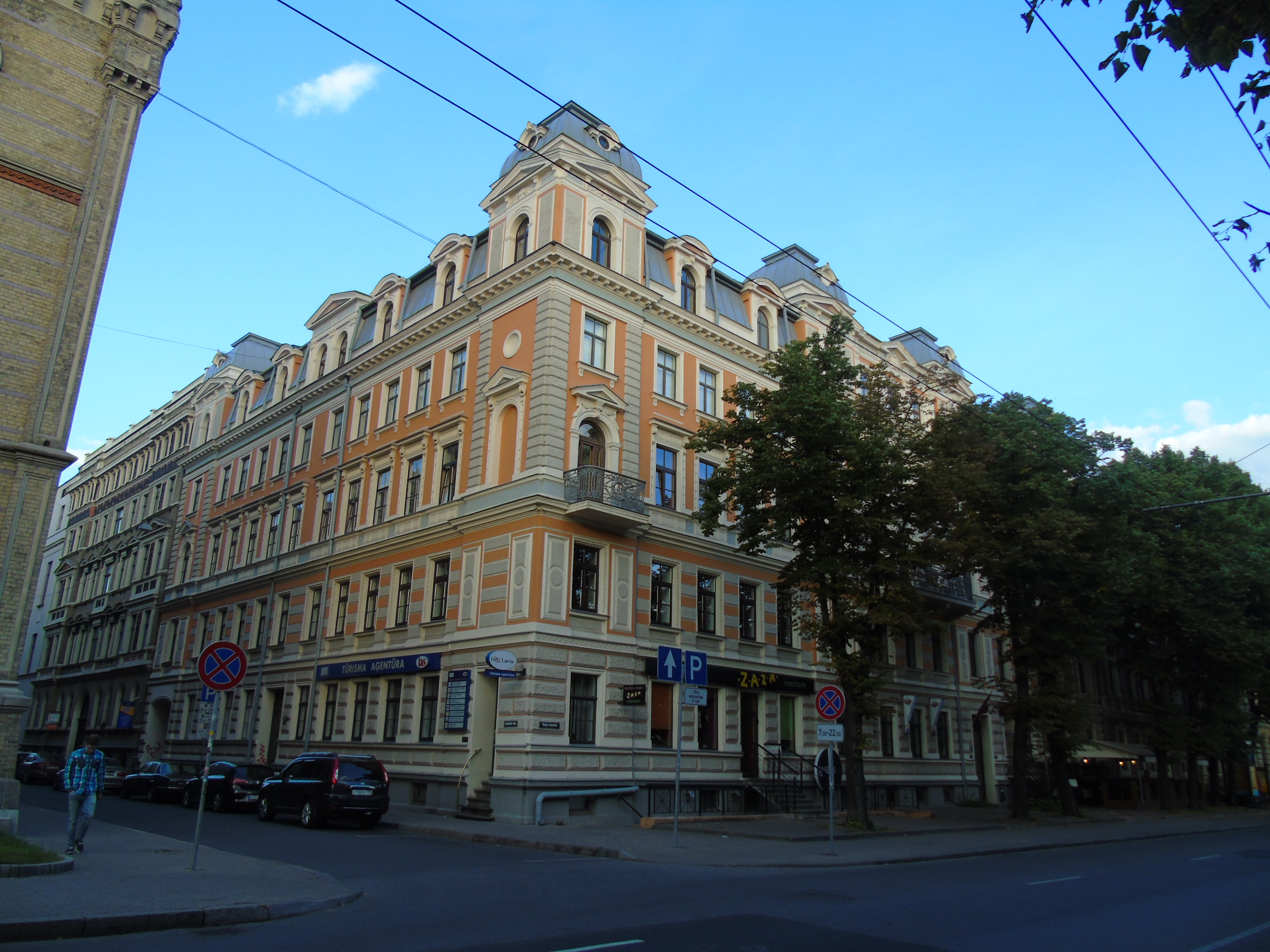
Residential building at Raiņa Boulevard 21, Riga (1875)

Church of the Intercession of the Most Holy Mother of God, Riga (1879)
