= Church of the Nativity of Saint John the Baptist, Ostrovo =

Serbian Orthodox church in Ostrovo, Croatia

Coordinates: 45°20′21″N 18°47′25″E

Church of the Nativity of Saint John the Baptist
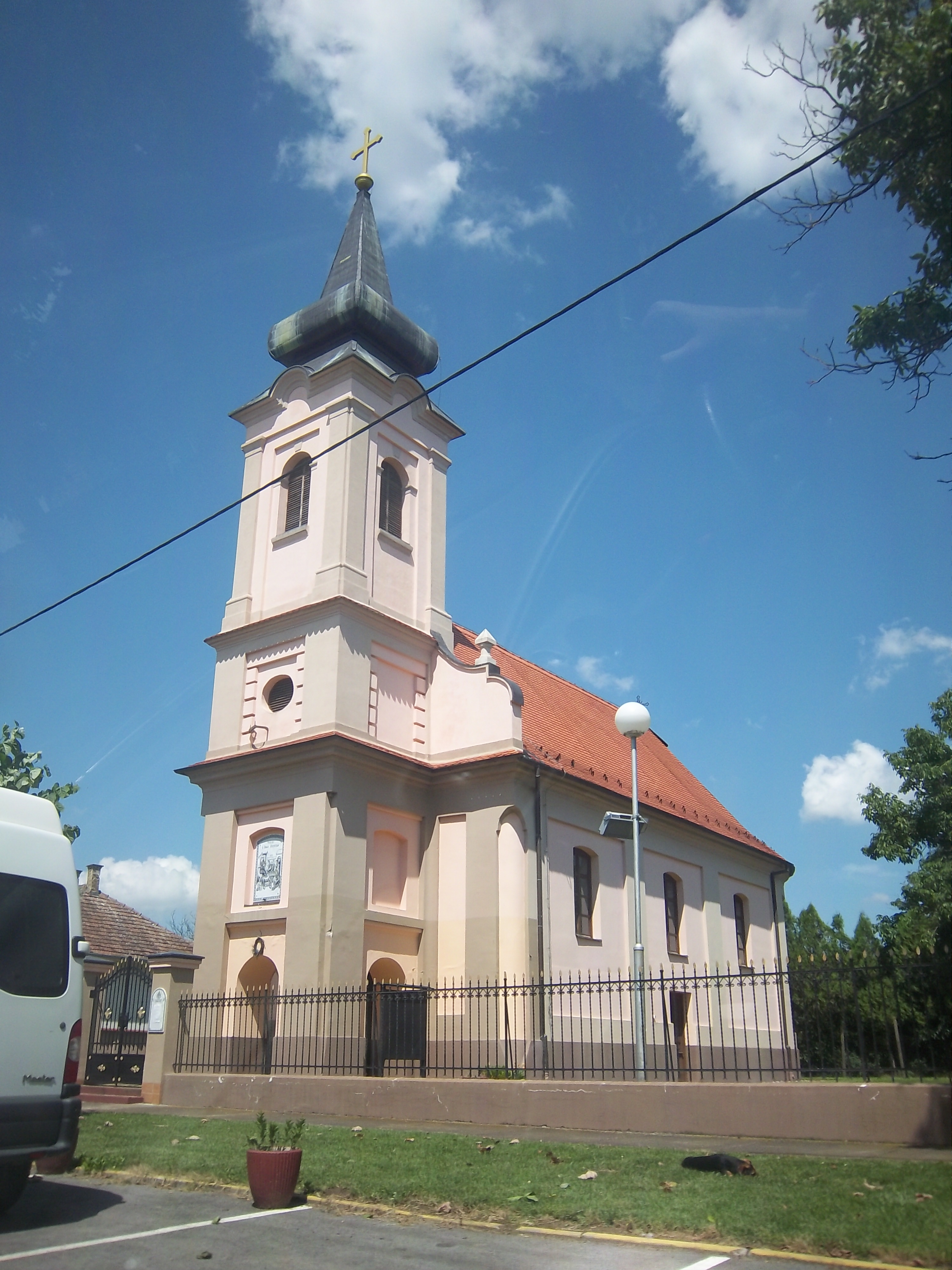
- Church of the Nativity of Saint John the Baptist
- Church of the Nativity of Saint John the Baptist
- Location: Ostrovo, Vukovar-Syrmia County
- Country: Croatia
- Denomination: Serbian Orthodox

History
- Status: Church
- Dedication: Nativity of Saint John the Baptist

Architecture
- Functional status: Active
- Years built: 1747-1752

Administration
- Archdiocese: Eparchy of Osijek Plain and Baranya

Church of the Nativity of Saint John the Baptist (Serbian Cyrillic: Црква рођења светог Јована Крститеља, Croatian: Crkva rođenja svetog Ivana Krstitelja) in Ostrovo is Serbian Orthodox church in eastern Croatia dedicated to the Nativity of Saint John the Baptist.

== History ==
The church was constructed between 1747 and 1752. Before the current building was constructed there was a wooden church at the same site at least since the 1733 when it was reported in a historical document. This older church was dedicated to Pentecost. The current church was blessed by Parteniy Pavlovich on 18 June 1752. Over the years church changed its iconostasis on three occasions (early 19th century made by Mihajlo Popović, 1841 by Đorđe Diklić and 1899 by Luka Aleksijević). The building was reconstructed in 1899, 1934, 1984 and 2005. The last reconstruction followed after the damage that occurred during the Croatian War of Independence. Prior to reconstruction, the building was included in the list of preventively protected heritage of the Register of Cultural Goods of Croatia where it stayed until 2007.

== See also ==
- List of Serbian Orthodox churches in Croatia
- Eparchy of Osijek Plain and Baranya
- Serbs of Croatia
