= Cathedral of the Nativity of the Blessed Virgin Mary, Novosibirsk =

Cathedral in Novosibirsk, Russia

Cathedral of the Nativity of the Blessed Virgin Mary Собор Рождества Пресвятой Богородицы
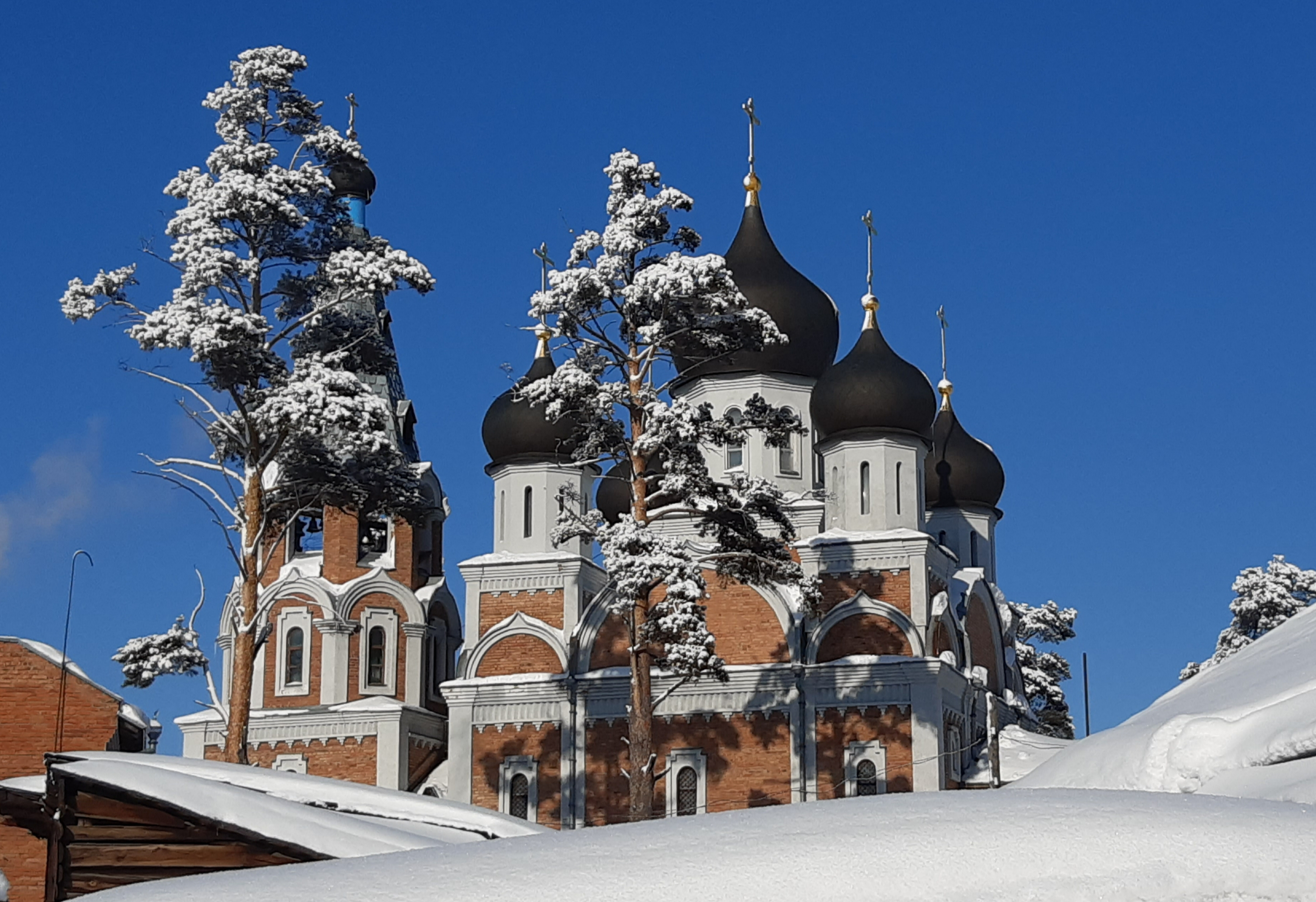

- Location within Novosibirsk Oblast Location within Russia

Religion
- Affiliation: Russian Orthodox

Location
- Location: Baidukov Street 1, Novosibirsk
- Coordinates: 55.0834°N 82.8906°E

Architecture
- Architect: A. P. Dolnakov
- Completed: 1999

The Cathedral of the Nativity of the Blessed Virgin Mary (Russian: Собор Рождества Пресвятой Богородицы) is the cathedral of the Diocese of Novosibirsk and All Siberia of the Russian Orthodox Old-Rite Church. It was built between 1990 and 1999. The cathedral is located in Zayeltsovsky District, Novosibirsk.

== History ==
The design was drawn up in 1989 by architects A.P. and E.A. Dolnakov.

On September 21, 1990, Metropolitan of Moscow and All Russia Alimpy consecrated a place for the construction of the church near Bestuzhev Street in Zayeltsovsky District.

A professional team of builders was hired only for the construction of foundations. The entire construction was carried out by an experienced builder O. F. Glebkin. The walls of the cathedral were built by parishioners Roman Bekrenyov and Boris Kokorin.

The auxiliary workers who participated in the construction were also parishioners: A. Bozhenkov, F. A. Ustinov, V. E. Shevyakov, N. A. Gaevsky, D. Gorenko, P. N. Lebedev; the Borisov brothers fenced the construction site with a metal fence and laid the cable.

Tomsk Old Believers helped build the temple: A. Volynets and D. Korobeinikov. The plasterer M. I. Nosik did a big job. The window blocks were made by the Besstannikovs from Gar.

Old Believer Alexander Chetvergov (later Metropolitan Andrian) from Kazan created the project of the iconostasis and built it himself, he also painted five icons for the church, gilded all the crosses of the cathedral and, in addition, on September 17, 1999, set the cross of the central dome.

=== Construction financing ===
During the construction of the church, there was often a shortage of funding, and construction stopped. Help was provided by Metropolitan Alimpiy. Old Believers from other Russian parishes collected donations. Help was provided by Old Believers from Alaska and Australia. The Novosibirsk City Hall and the Novosibirsk Oblast Government also helped the community.

=== Consecration ===
On September 19, 1999, Metropolitan Alimpy consecrated the Cathedral of the Nativity of the Blessed Virgin Mary. A large number of people attended the consecration ceremony: clergy and laity, Russian Old Believers and Old Believers from other countries.
