= Birth of John the Baptist (Signorelli) =

Tempera on panel painting

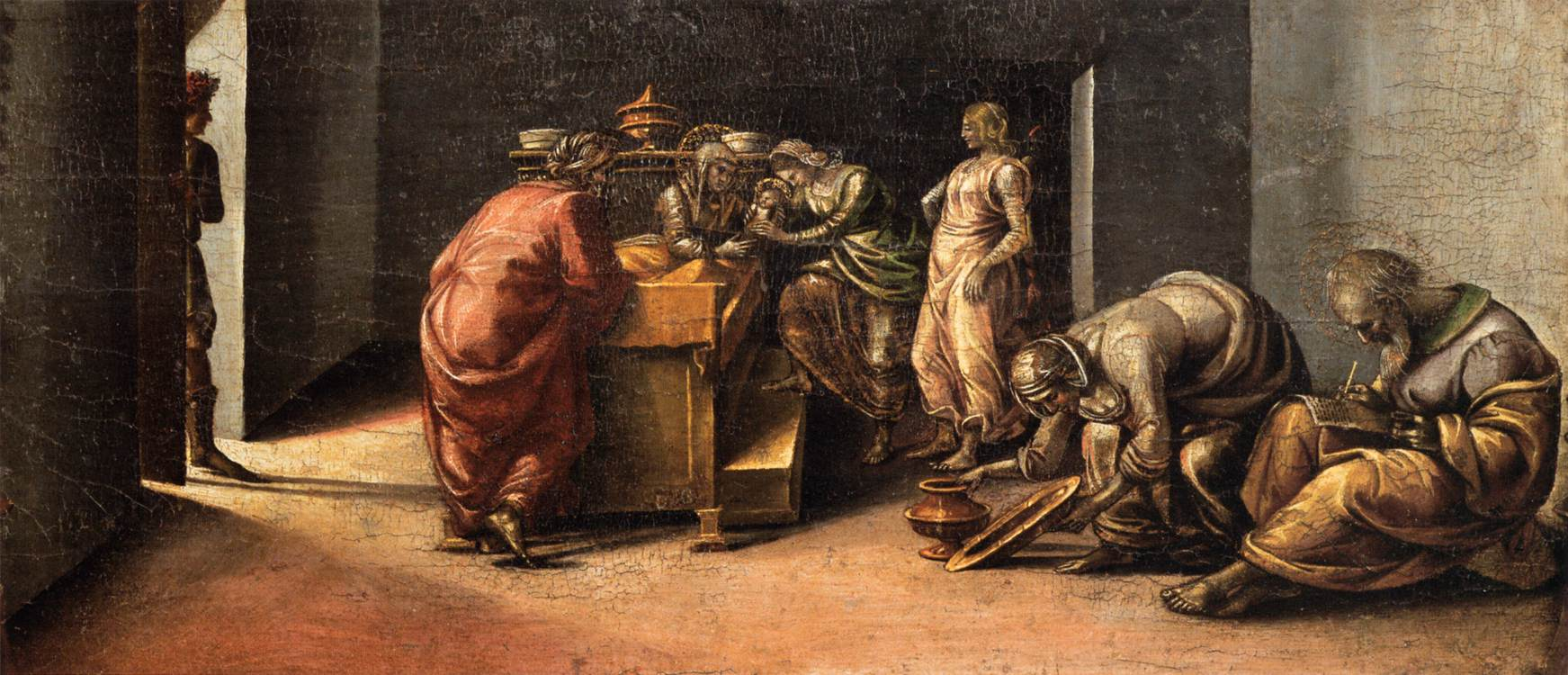
Birth of John the Baptist, c. 1485–1490, tempera on wood, 32 x 70 cm (12.5 x 27.5 in.), Louvre

Birth of John the Baptist is a c. 1485–1490 tempera on panel painting by Luca Signorelli. Originally part of the predella of an unknown altarpiece (though Raffaele Caracciolo definitively linked it to the Sant'Onofrio Altarpiece), it was acquired on the art market in 1824 by the Louvre, where it still hangs in the Salle des Sept-Mètres.

== History and art review ==
The painting is thought to be an early work of Signorelli. It is unusually cursive in style for the artist, and is notable as an experiment in the use of dramatic lighting. The Birth of John the Baptist has been called one of the best examples of the work of Signorelli.
