= Nativity Cathedral, Shkodër =

Modern orthodox cathedral in Shkodër, Albania

Coordinates: 42°4′7″N 19°30′53″E

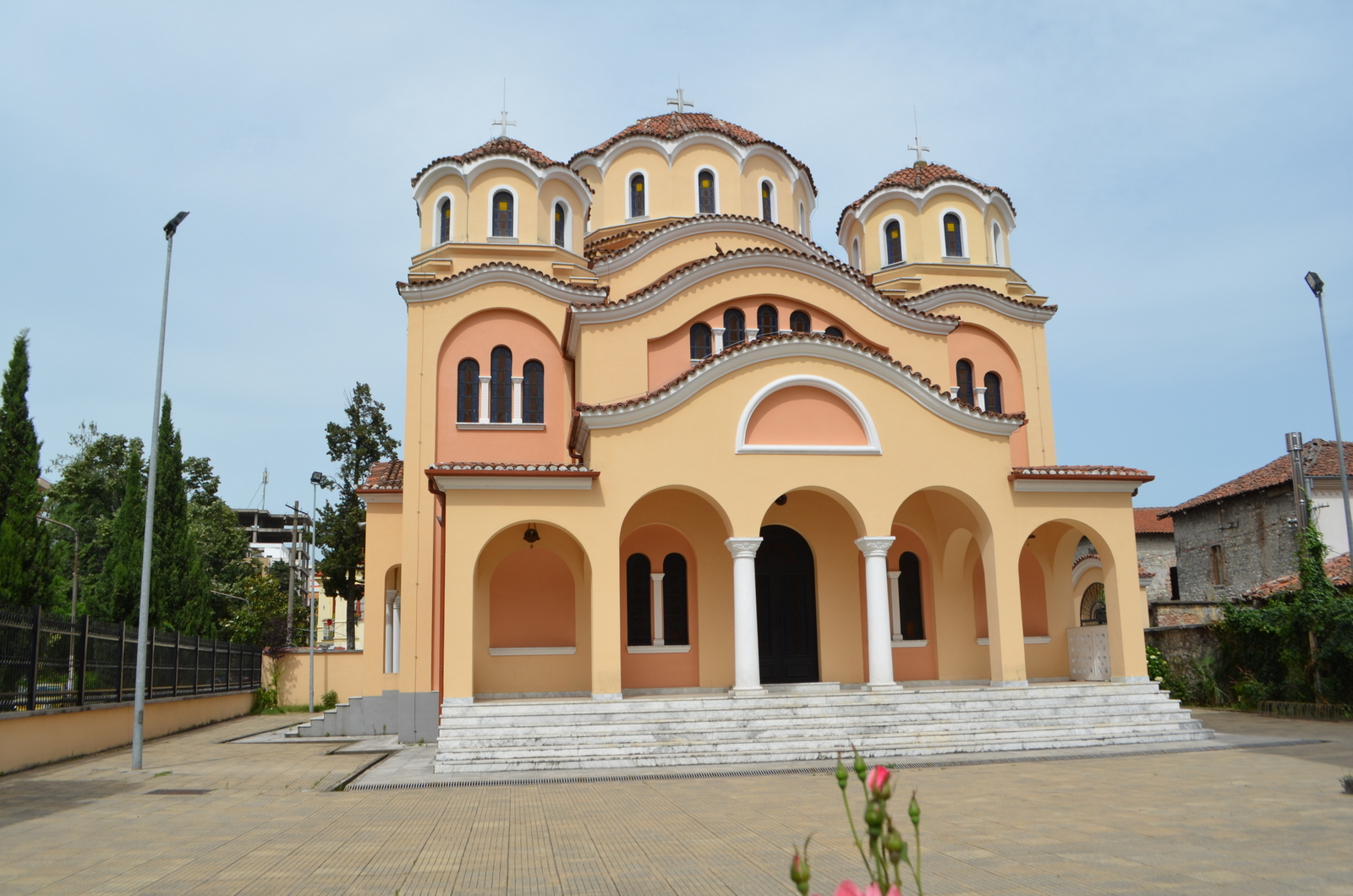
Orthodox Cathedral of Shkodra

The Nativity of the Lord Orthodox Cathedral of Shkodër (Albanian: Katedralja “Lindjes së Zotit”) is an Albanian Orthodox cathedral located in the city of Shkodër in northwestern Albania.

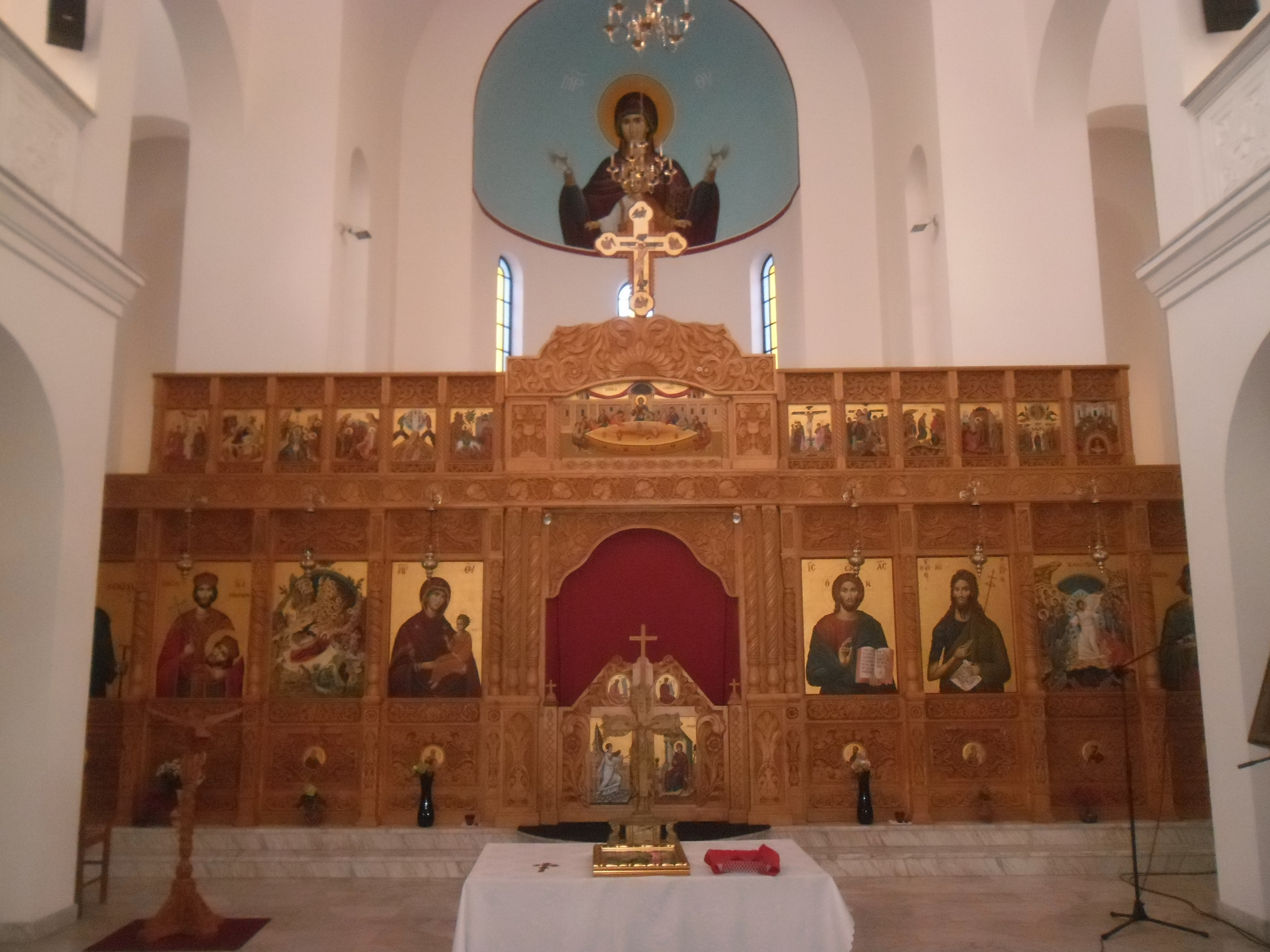
Interior

On July 11, 1992, a terrorist attack destroyed parts of the church and the altar.
