= Nativity of Saint John the Baptist (Pontormo) =

Painting by Pontormo

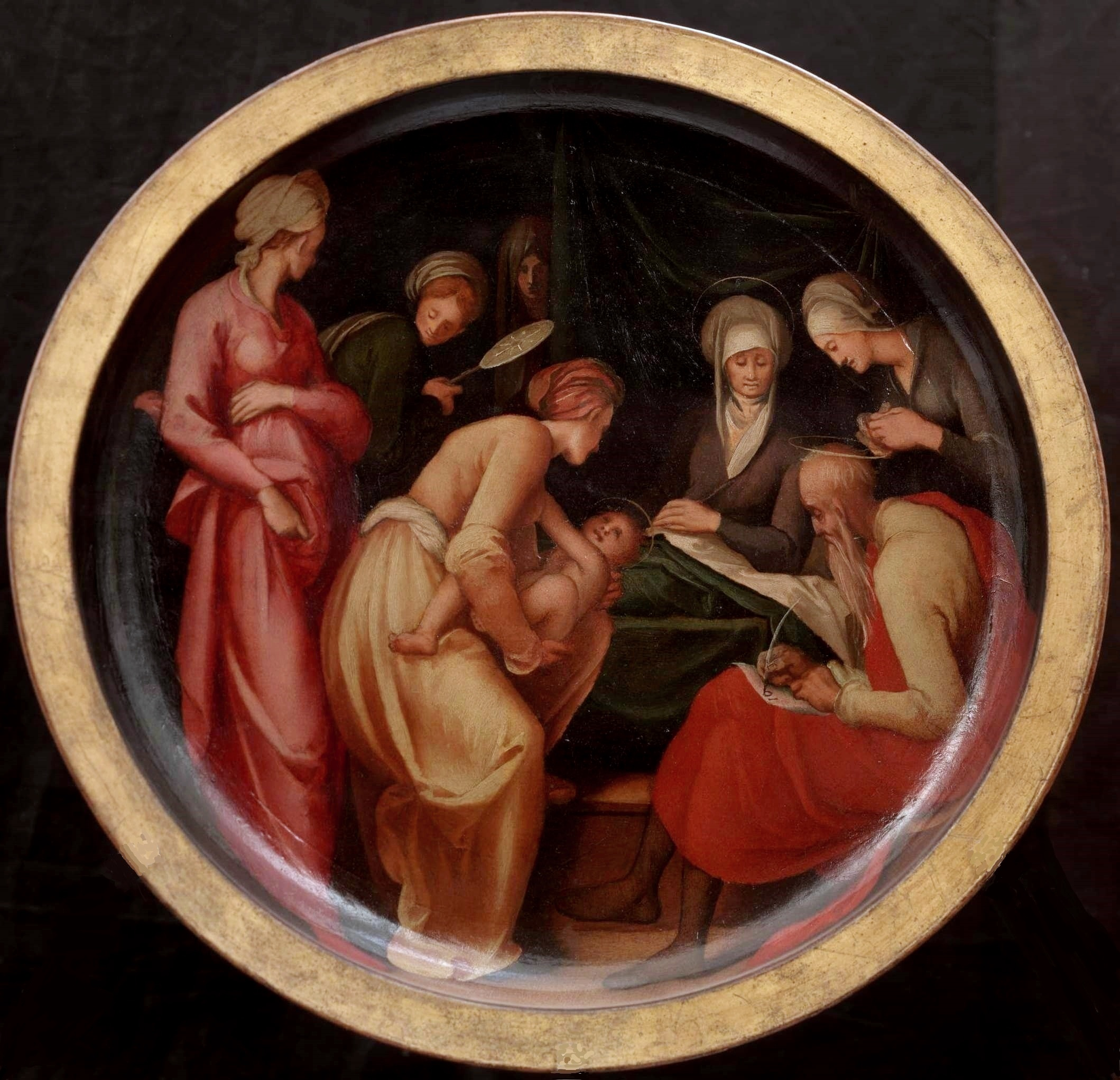
Obverse

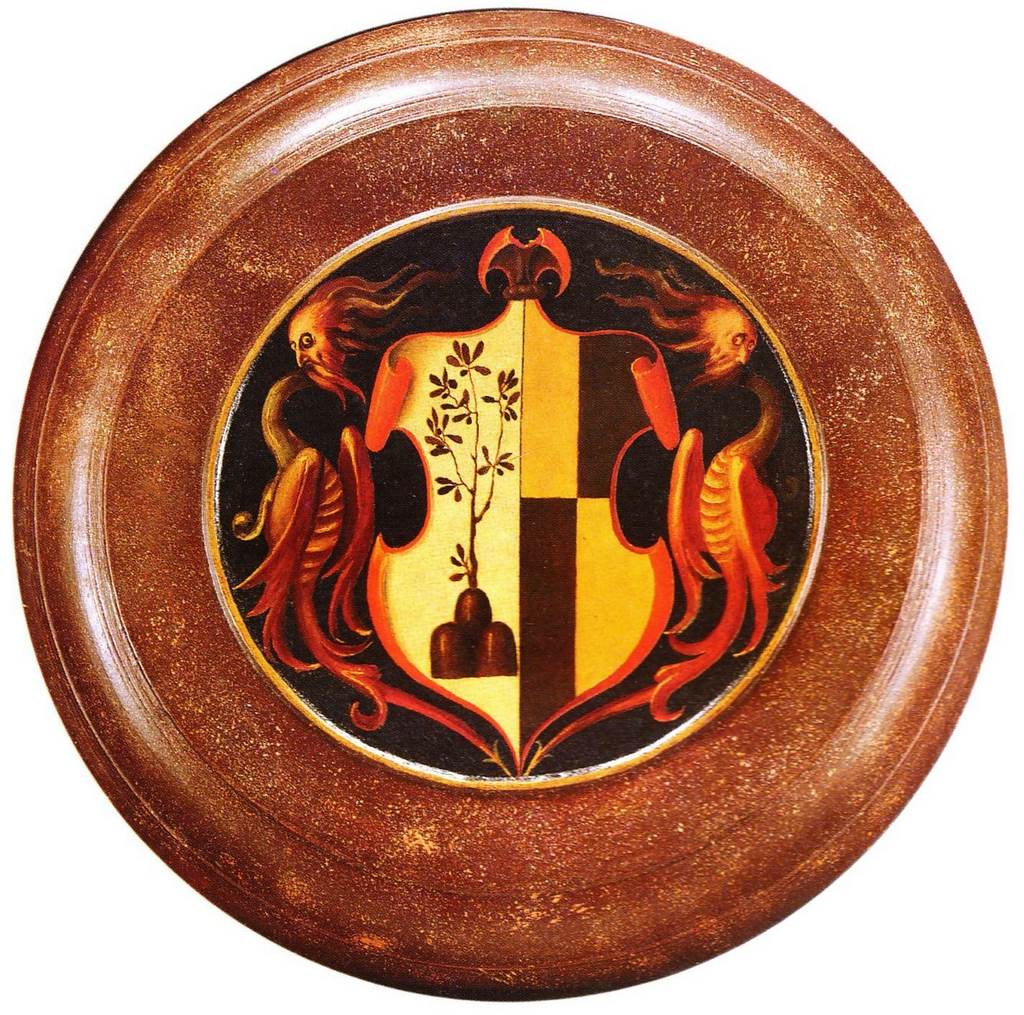
Reverse

Nativity of Saint John the Baptist is a 1526 oil on panel desco da parto painting by Pontormo, now in the Uffizi, where it has been since at least 1704. There is a copy in the Fogg Art Museum. Its status as an autograph work is accepted by most art critics, but was disputed by Philippe Costamagna.

The coat of arms on the reverse shows it was produced to celebrate the birth of Aldighieri della Casa on 15 January 1527. He was the eldest son of Girolamo della Casa and Lisabetta Tornaquinci, who had married each other in 1521.

== Bibliography ==
- (in Italian) Elisabetta Marchetti Letta, Pontormo, Rosso Fiorentino, Scala, Firenze 1994. ISBN 88-8117-028-0
- (in Italian) Gloria Fossi, Uffizi, Giunti, Firenze 2004, pag. 112. ISBN 88-09-03675-1
