= Nativity of Jesus (disambiguation) =

The nativity of Jesus is the biblical account of his birth.

Nativity of Jesus may also refer to:

- The Nativity (film), a 1978 American made-for-television biographical drama film
- The Nativity (play), a medieval mystery play telecast in 1952 on CBS's Westinghouse Studio One
- The Nativity Story, 2006 film
- The Nativity (TV series), shown on BBC One in 2010 between 20 December and 23 December
- The Nativity (Burne-Jones), an 1887 painting by Burne-Jones
- Nativity (film series)
- The Nativity (Piero della Francesca), a 1470–1475 painting

== See also ==
- Nativity (disambiguation)
- Nativity of Jesus in art
- Nativity scene
- Nativity of Jesus in later culture
- Christmas Eve
