= Church of the Nativity (disambiguation) =

Church of the Nativity or Nativity Church or variations on these are names shared by several churches around the world:

- Church of the Nativity, Opočno, Czech Republic
- Nativity Church, Căuşeni, Moldova
- Church of the Nativity, in Bethlehem, built over the place considered to be the birthplace of Jesus Christ

== Russia ==
- Church of the Nativity (Magadan), a Roman Catholic church serving victims of Stalin's forced labor camps
- Church of the Nativity (Nizhnekundryuchenskaya)
- Church of the Nativity in Krokhino, a former church that is submerged underwater

== Ukraine ==
- Church of the Nativity of Jesus Christ, Ternopil

== United Kingdom ==
- Holy Nativity Church, Eastfield, North Yorkshire, England

== United States ==
- Episcopal Church of the Nativity (Huntsville, Alabama), listed on the NRHP in Alabama
- Church of the Nativity (Menlo Park, California), listed on the NRHP in California
- Episcopal Church of the Nativity (Rosedale, Louisiana), listed on the NRHP in Louisiana
- Church of the Nativity (Manhattan), a Roman Catholic parish located on 2nd Avenue in New York City
- Episcopal Church of the Nativity (Union, South Carolina), listed on the NRHP in South Carolina

== See also ==
- Cathedral of the Nativity (disambiguation)
- Church of the Nativity of Mary (disambiguation)
- Nativity of Saint John the Baptist Church (disambiguation)
