= Cathedral of the Nativity of Christ, Riga =

Church building in Riga, Latvia

Nativity Cathedral
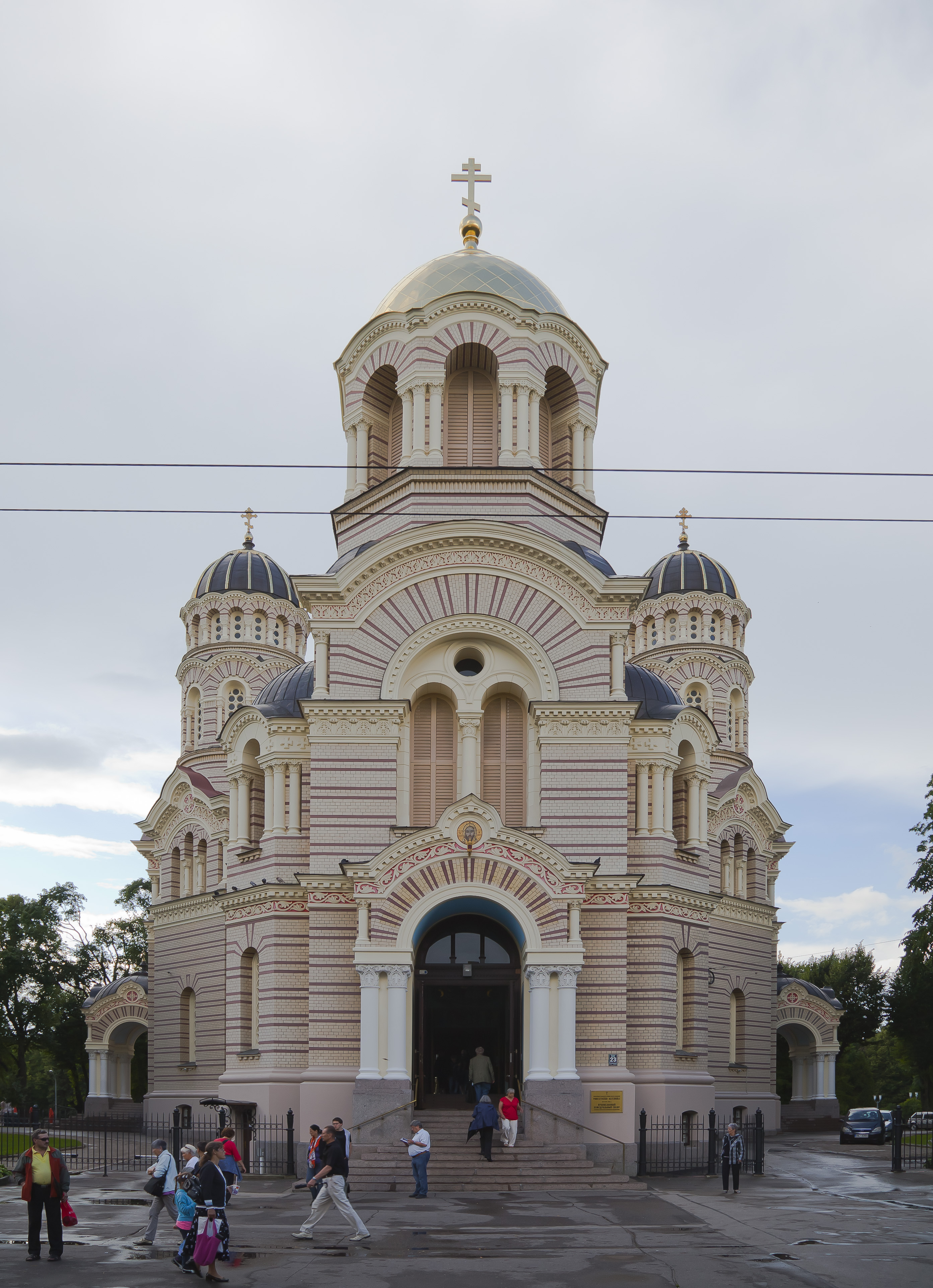
- The Nativity of Christ Cathedral in 2012

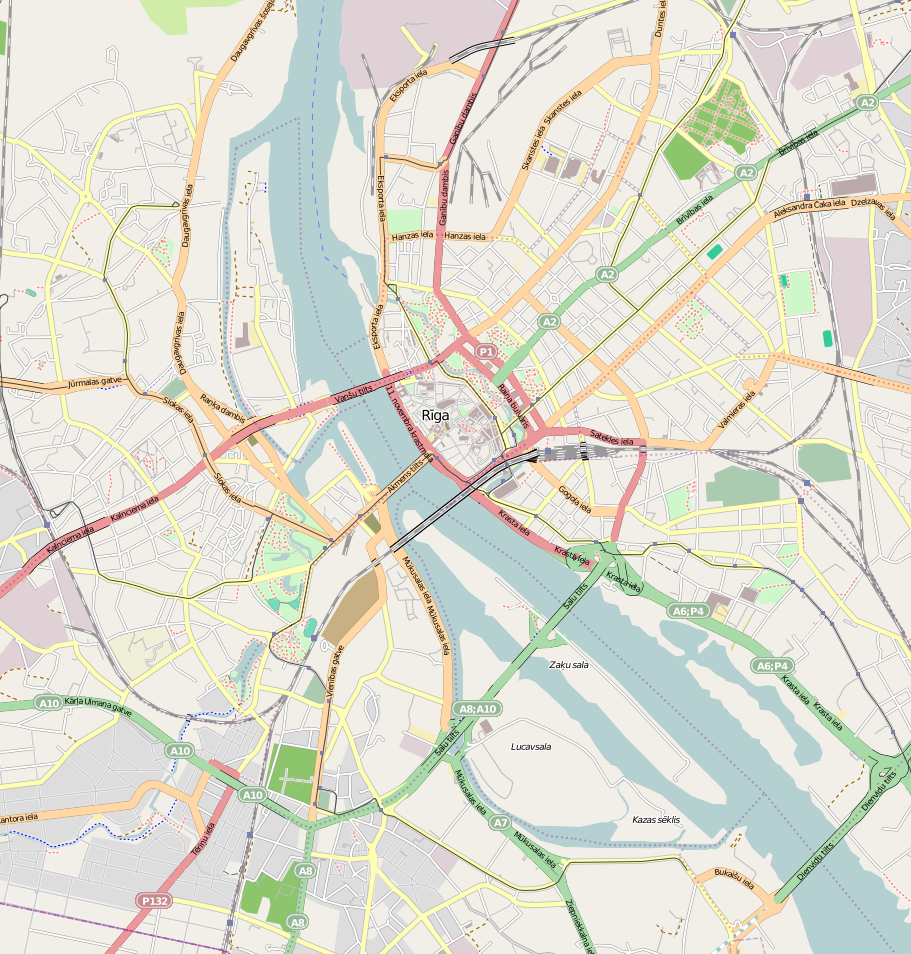
- Location within Riga
- 56°57′14.09″N 24°6′55.97″E
- Location: Riga
- Country: Latvia
- Denomination: Eastern Orthodox

The Nativity of Christ Cathedral (Latvian: Kristus Piedzimšanas pareizticīgo katedrāle, Russian: Христорождественский кафедральный собор), Riga, Latvia was built to a design by Nikolai Chagin and Robert Pflug in a Neo-Byzantine style between 1876 and 1883, with decorations made by the firm of August Volz, during the period when the country was part of the Russian Empire. It is the largest Orthodox cathedral in the Baltic provinces built with the blessing of the Russian Tsar Alexander II on the initiative of local governor-general Pyotr Bagration and bishop Veniamin Karelin. The Nativity of Christ Cathedral is renowned for its icons, some of which were painted by Vasili Vereshchagin. During the First World War German troops occupied Riga and turned its largest Russian Orthodox cathedral into a Lutheran church. In independent Latvia, the Nativity of Christ Cathedral once again became an Orthodox cathedral in 1921. Archbishop Jānis Pommers, a native Latvian, played a key part in the defence of the cathedral, including defence from the Latvian government which was extremely unfriendly to Orthodox Church in the first years of an independent Latvia. In the early 1960s, Soviet authorities closed down the cathedral and converted its building into a planetarium. The cathedral has been restored since Latvia regained independence from the Soviet Union in 1991.

In 2002, new bells cast in the Russian ZIL factory were brought. In 2010, the bell tower and the dome were gilded, at a cost of 550,000 euros.

== Gallery ==
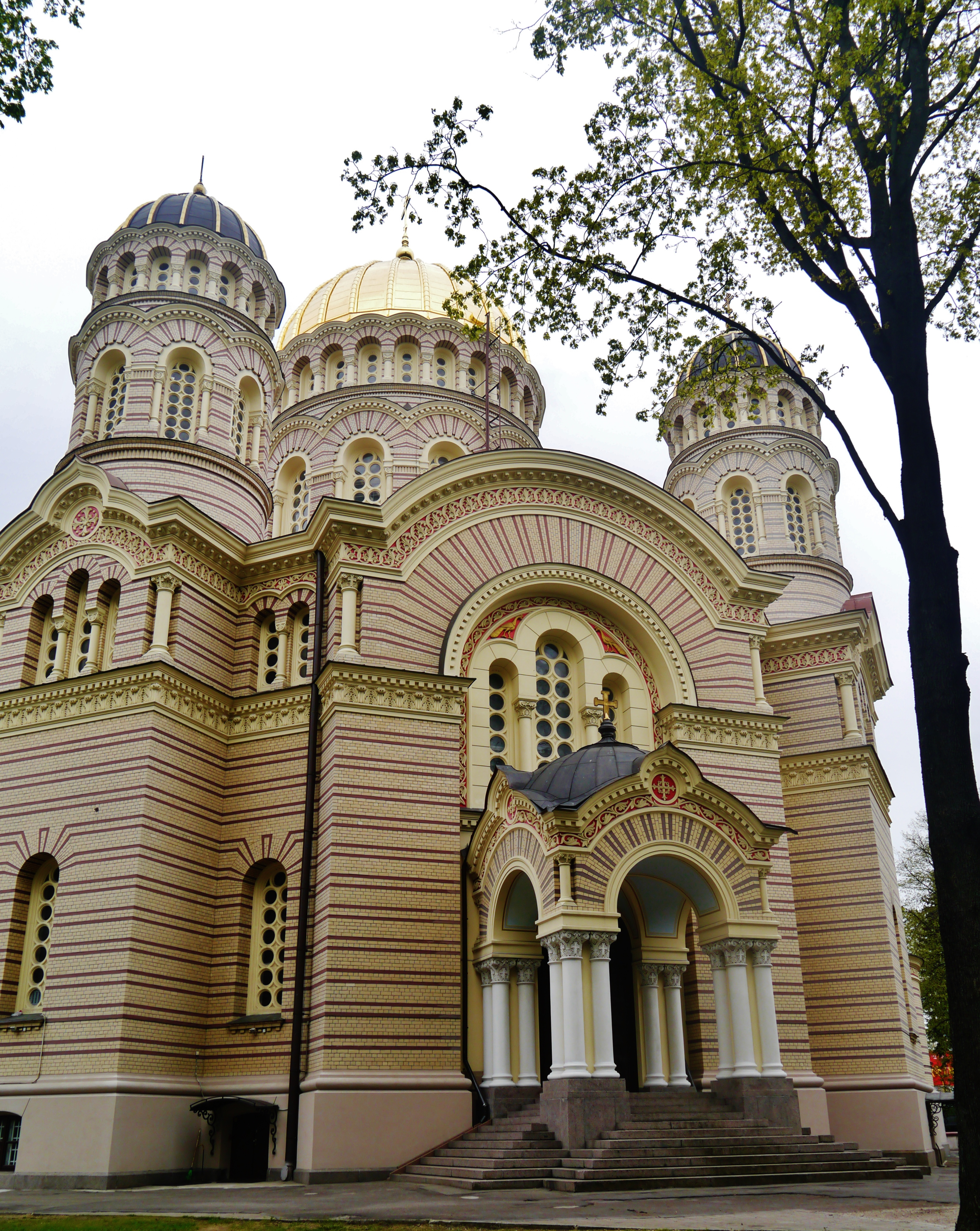
Side door

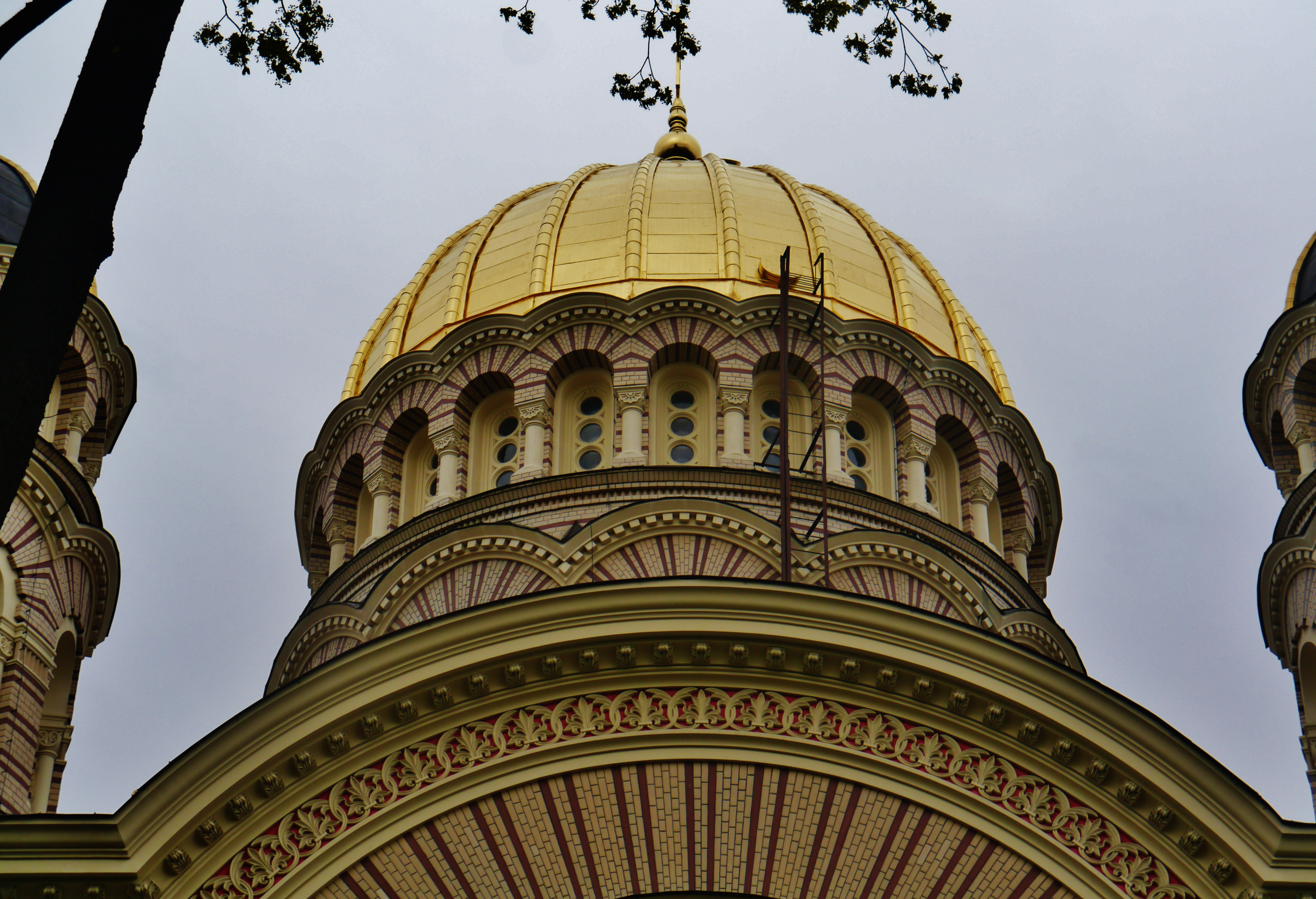
Central dome

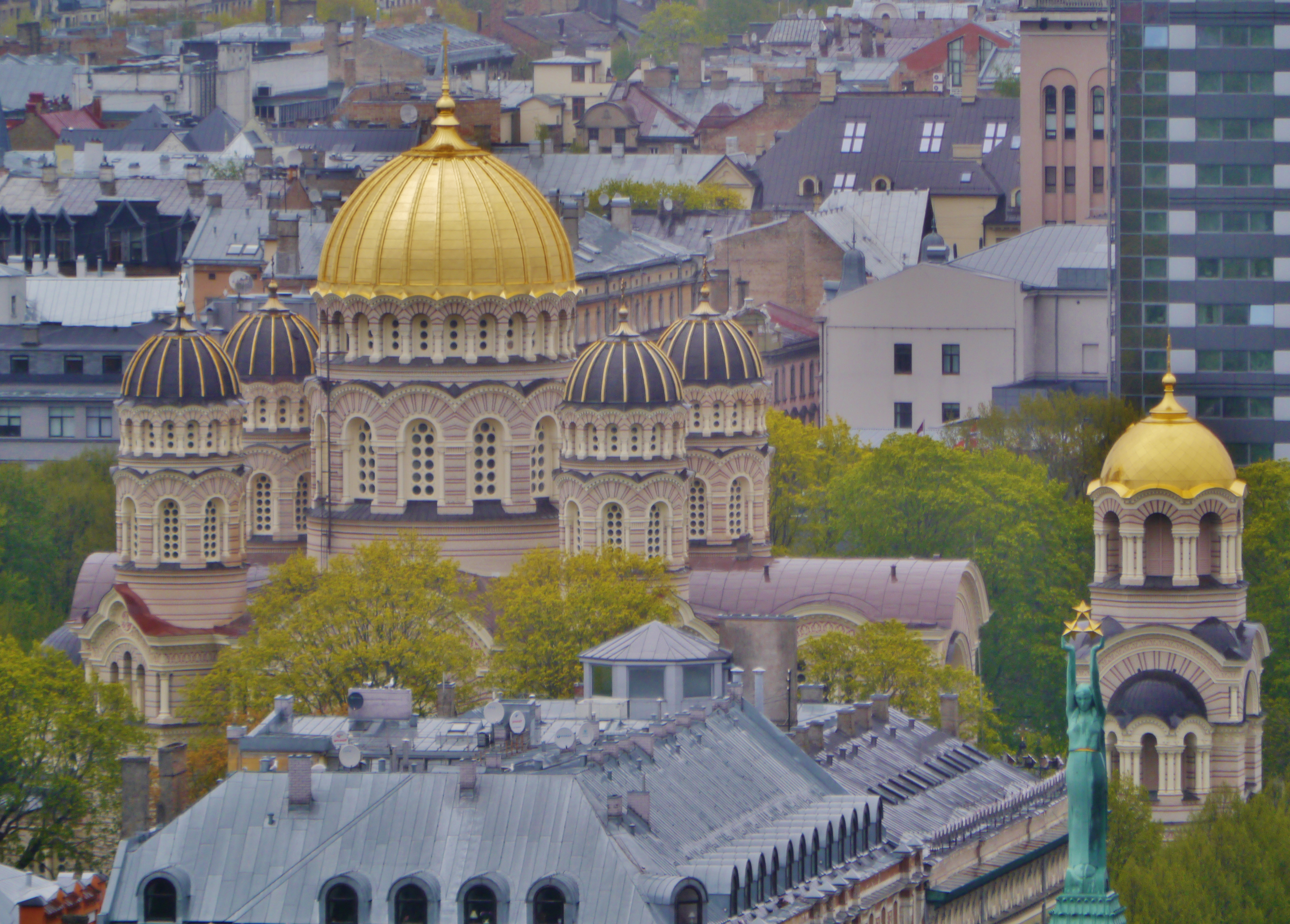
From St. Peter's Church

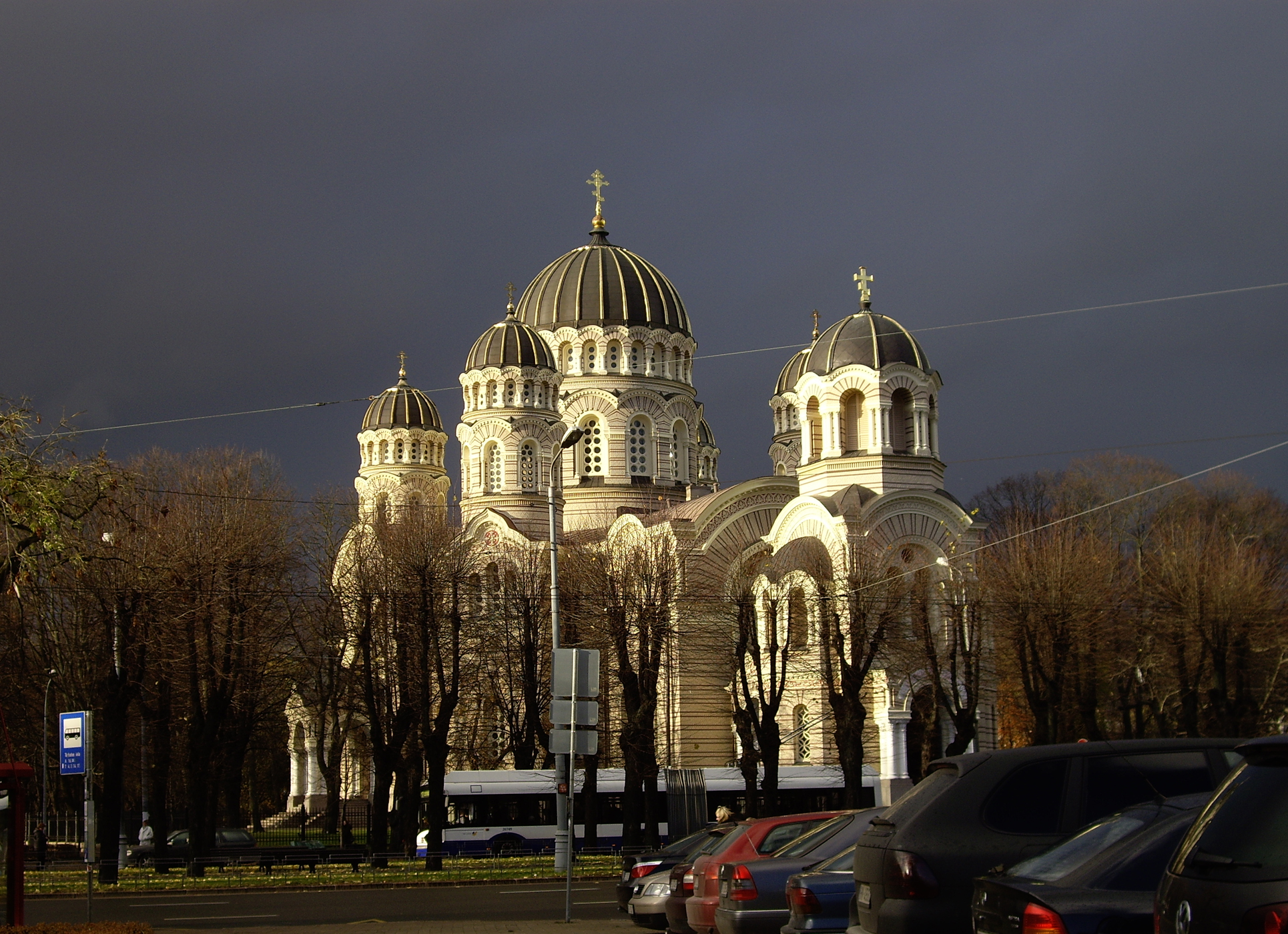
Prior to gilding

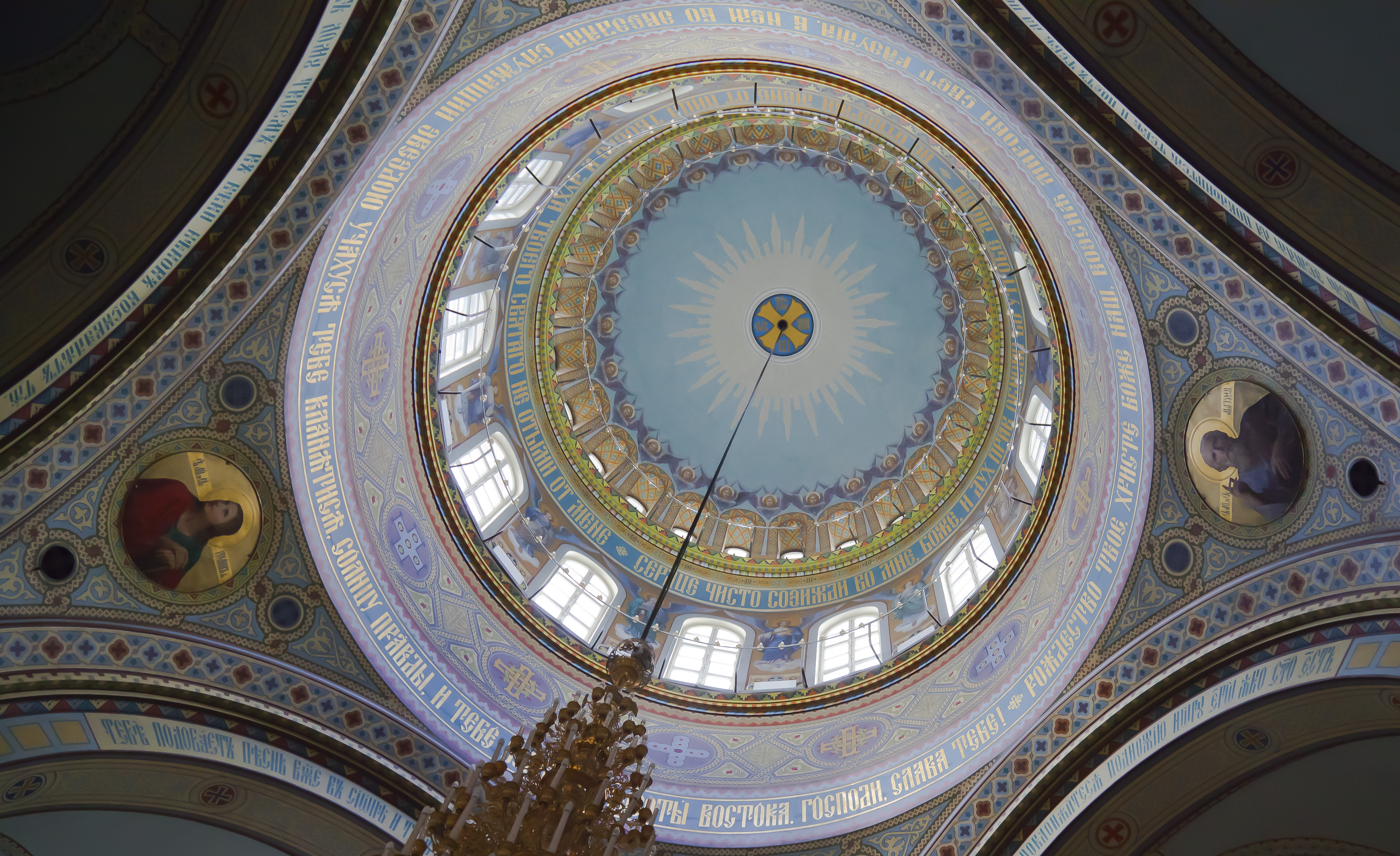
Dome interior

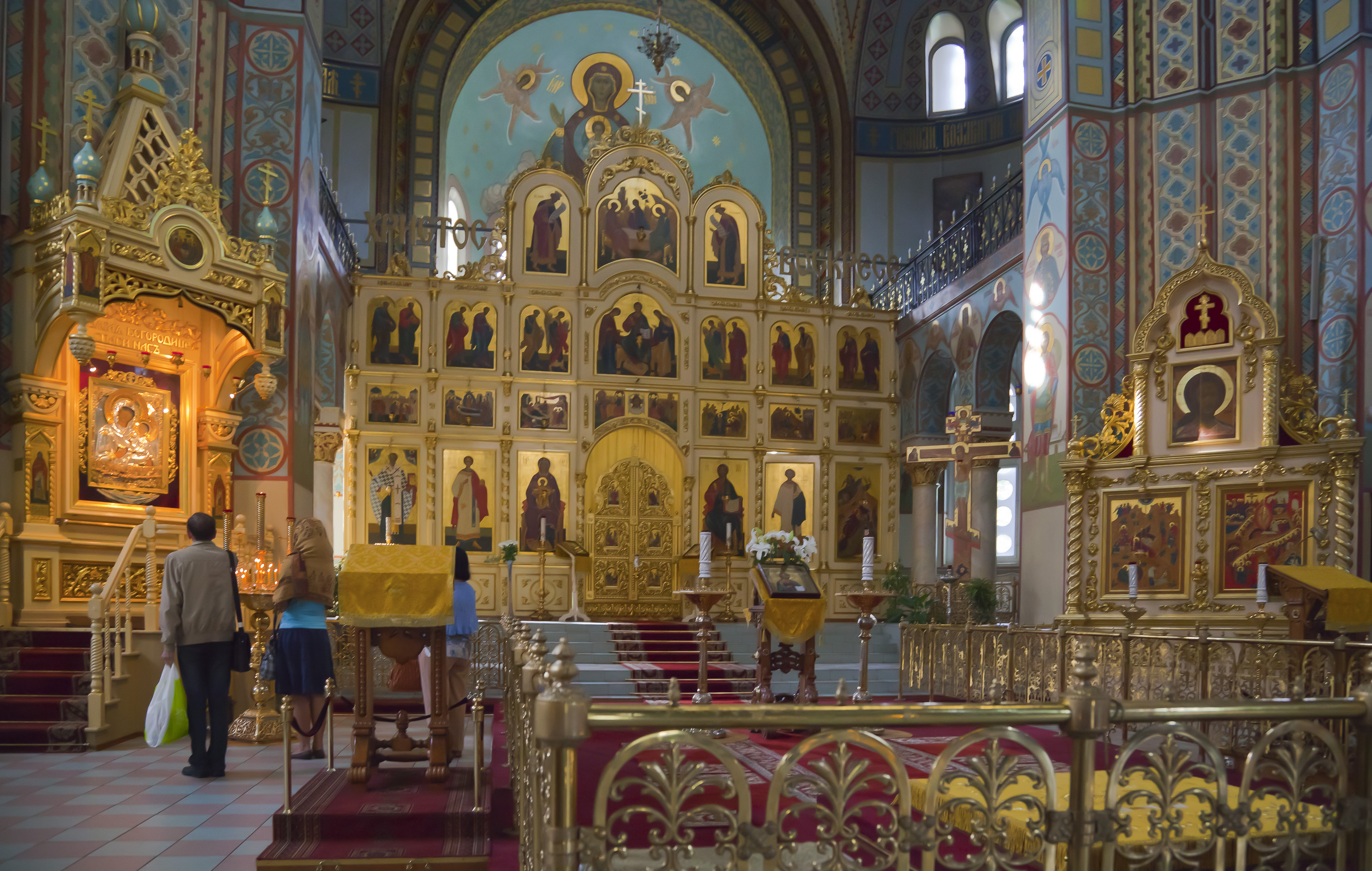
The iconostasis

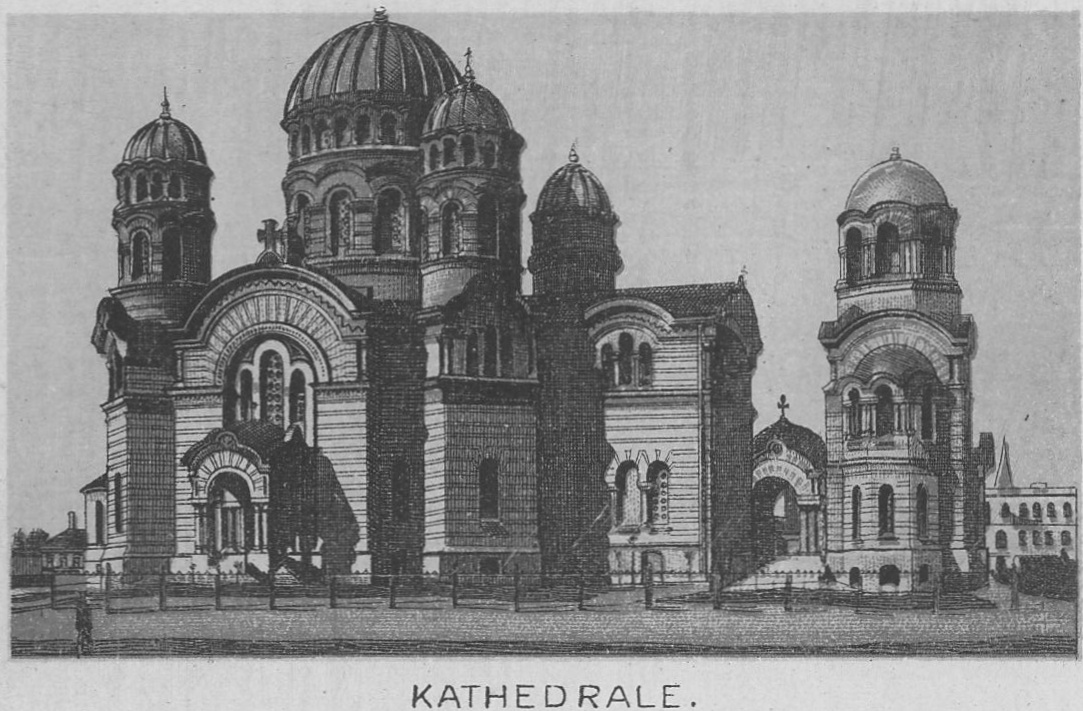
Ca. 1900

== See also ==
- Neo-Byzantine architecture in the Russian Empire
- Latvian Orthodox Church
