= European route E5 in Spain =

Road route in Spain

The European route E5 in Spain is a series of roads, part of the International E-road network, running from the French border near Irun, via Madrid to Algeciras. The E5 originates in Scotland, travelling south to Southampton where it crosses the English Channel to the French city of Le Havre. Via Paris and Bordeaux it reaches the Spanish border near Hendaye.

== Route ==
The E5 in Spain starts at the French border in Irun, Basque Country, arriving from the A63 autoroute from Bordeaux and Bayonne. It follows the AP-8 to the major city San Sebastián until Eibar. In Eibar, the E5 turns south towards the AP-1 going to the Basque capital Vitoria-Gasteiz. After crossing the small Treviño enclave, it crosses the border with Castile and León towards Burgos. After Burgos, the road goes further south through the arid regions of central Spain, arriving in the Spanish capital Madrid. The E5 uses the eastern part of the Madrid Ring Road M-40, passing the Adolfo Suárez Madrid–Barajas Airport. South of Madrid, near Getafe, the E5 follows the A-4 highway going south. The road enters the sparsely populated Castilla–La Mancha region, where it passes both of the major cities Toledo and Ciudad Real about 50 km to the east. In Southern Spain, the border with Andalusia is crossed in the Despeñaperros national park. At Bailen, there is an important junction with the E902 towards Granada and Málaga. The E5 goes southwest passing Córdoba to end at the capital of Andalusia and the major city Seville, passing the city on the east. The A-4 transforms into the AP-4 towards the city of Jerez de la Frontera and the coastal city Cádiz. South of Cádiz, the E5 uses the A-48 highway and the N-340 road close the Atlantic coast, passing the most southern point of Europe in Tarifa, to end at the port city of Algeciras, just across Gibraltar. The E5 passes five regions (Basque Country, Castile and León, Madrid, Castilla–La Mancha and Andalusia) as well as 10 provinces. The E5 is a toll road from Irun to Eibar on the Autopista AP-8 and on the Autopista AP-1 from Eibar to Vitoria-Gasteiz and from Miranda de Ebro to Burgos. They are all open toll systems. Although the Autopista AP-4 from Seville to Cádiz should be a toll road, it is not in practice. The E5 covers a total distance of 1.221 km (759 mi) in Spain.

== Detailed route ==
E5 Irun – Algeciras
Province	National road number	Section	Junction	Northbound destinations	Southbound destinations
(European Union) (France) (Nouvelle-Aquitaine)	A63 motorway	France towards Bayonne, Bordeaux and Paris			
(European Union) (Spain) (Basque Country (autonomous community)) Basque Country Gipuzkoa	AP-8 motorway Autopista del Cantábrico	Irun – San Sebastián	0 N-121-A Irun, Pamplona, San Sebastián Airport, San Sebastián (N1) 7 GI-636 Irun, Hondarribia, San Sebastián Airport Irun-Ventas services of Oiartzun 11 GI-2132 Oiartzun, Errenteria, Lezo 12 GI-20 San Sebastián, Errenteria, Pasaia 19 A-15, GI-40 Pamplona, San Sebastián, Astigarraga, Hernani, Zaragoza (AP-68), France (Bayonne, Bordeaux) services of Hernani	Irun France (Bayonne) (Bordeaux)	San Sebastián Vitoria-Gasteiz Bilbao
(European Union) (Spain) (Basque Country (autonomous community)) Basque Country Gipuzkoa	AP-8 motorway Autopista del Cantábrico	San Sebastián – Eibar	24 A-1, N-1 Lasarte-Oria, Andoain, Tolosa, Pamplona (A-15) (only westbound) 27 GI-20 San Sebastián, Lasarte-Oria (GI-11), Pamplona (A-15), Tolosa (A-1) (only eastbound) 33 N-634 Orio, Aia 38 N-634 Zarautz, Getaria, Orio Zarautz 48 GI-631 Zestoa, Azpeitia, Azkoitia, Zumaia (N-634) 54 N-634 Deba, Itziar, Mutriku, Ondarroa, Lekeitio, services 64 N-634, GI-2634 Elgoibar, Mendaro, Azkoitia, Markina-Xemein 69, 145 AP-1, AP-8, E70, E80 Bilbao, Eibar, Ermua, Santander, Vitoria-Gasteiz, Burgos, Bergara, Madrid, Algeciras, San Sebastián, Irun France (Bordeaux)	San Sebastián Irun France (Bordeaux)	Vitoria-Gasteiz Bilbao Burgos
(European Union) (Spain) (Basque Country (autonomous community)) Basque Country Gipuzkoa	AP-1 motorway Autopista del Norte	Eibar – Leintz Gatzaga	138 GI-627 Bergara-herrigunea/centro, Elgeta, Elorrio (only southbound) 133 GI-627 Bergara-hegoa/sur, Beasain (A-636), Zumarraga 130 GI-627, N-636 Mondragón/Arrasate, Durango, Oñati services of Mondragón/Arrasate (only northbound) 123 GI-627 Aretxabaleta, Eskoriatza, Leintz Gatzaga services of Eskoriatza (only southbound)	San Sebastián Irun France (Bordeaux)	Vitoria-Gasteiz Burgos
Araba/Álava	AP-1 motorway Autopista del Norte	Leintz Gatzaga – Etxebarri	107 N-240 Vitoria-Gasteiz, Bilbao, Legutio near Etxebarri-Ibiña 102 Etxebarri-Ibiña 101 N-622, N-624 Vitoria-Gasteiz, Bilbao, Vitoria Airport, Foronda, Murgia, Burgos (A-1)	San Sebastián Irun France (Bordeaux)	Vitoria-Gasteiz Burgos
Araba/Álava	N-622	Etxebarri – Vitoria-Gasteiz	6 A-3602, A-4405 Aránguiz A-1, E80 Vitoria-Gasteiz, San Sebastián, Pamplona (A-10), Miranda de Ebro, Burgos, Madrid, Valladolid (A-62), Logroño (AP-68)	San Sebastián Irun France (Bordeaux)	Vitoria-Gasteiz Burgos
Araba/Álava	Autovía A-1 motorway Autovía del Norte	Vitoria-Gasteiz – La Puebla de Arganzón	services near Lopidana 348, 347 A-3302 Vitoria-Gasteiz, Mendoza 345 A-4302 Vitoria-Gasteiz, Trespuentes, Júndiz Industrial Zone 343 A-3302, N-102 Vitoria-Gasteiz, Mendoza, Nanclares de la Oca, Subillabide Industrial Zone Services of Ruta de Europa (only northbound) 340 A-2622 Nanclares de la Oca, Los Llanos Industrial Zone	Vitoria-Gasteiz Pamplona San Sebastián	Burgos Valladolid Madrid
(European Union) (Spain) Castile and León Burgos Treviño enclave	Autovía A-1 motorway Autovía del Norte	La Puebla de Arganzón	334 CL-127, N-1 La Puebla de Arganzón, Treviño	Vitoria-Gasteiz Pamplona San Sebastián	Burgos Valladolid Madrid
(European Union) (Spain) (Basque Country (autonomous community)) Basque Country Araba/Álava	Autovía A-1 motorway Autovía del Norte	La Puebla de Arganzón – Armiñón	328 N-1, A-4160 Armiñón, Estavillo 328 AP-1, E80 Burgos, Valladolid, Madrid, Vitoria-Gasteiz, San Sebastián, Miranda de Ebro, Bilbao (AP-68), Logroño (AP-68)	Vitoria-Gasteiz Pamplona San Sebastián	Burgos Valladolid Madrid
(European Union) (Spain) (Basque Country (autonomous community)) Basque Country Araba/Álava	Autopista AP-1 motorway Autopista del Norte	Armiñón – Miranda de Ebro	6 AP-68, E804 Bilbao, Miranda de Ebro-Sur, Haro, Logroño, Zaragoza	Vitoria-Gasteiz Bilbao San Sebastián	Burgos Valladolid Madrid
(European Union) (Spain) Castile and León Burgos	Autopista AP-1 motorway Autopista del Norte	Miranda de Ebro – Burgos	Parking Miranda de Ebro 5 BU-535, A-2122 Miranda de Ebro, Puentelarrá 4a N-1 Ameyugo, Santa Gadea del Cid, Burgos, Vitoria-Gasteiz Services near Ameyugo 4 N-232 Pancorbo, Santander, Logroño, Haro Parking near Pancorbo Parking near Grisaleña 3 N-1 Briviesca, Burgos, Vitoria-Gasteiz, Belorado (BU-710) Services near Briviesca Parking near Santa Olalla de Bureba Services near Quintanapalla 2 N-1 Villafría, Rubena, Burgos-Norte (A-1), Santander (A-1) Cardeñajimeno 1, 242 A-1 Burgos-Norte, Santander (N-623), Burgos Airport, Logroño (N-120)	Vitoria-Gasteiz Bilbao San Sebastián	Burgos Valladolid Madrid
(European Union) (Spain) Castile and León Burgos	Autovía A-1 motorway Autovía del Norte	Burgos – Aranda de Duero	238 Burgos-Centro, Santander (N-623), Cortes 236 BU-30, BU-11, E80 Burgos-Centro, Madrid, Aranda de Duero, Soria (N-234), Palencia (A-62), Valladolid (A-62), León (A-231), Miranda de Ebro (AP-1), Bilbao (AP-1), Vitoria-Gasteiz (AP-1), Logroño (N-120), Santander (N-623) 235, 234 Services near Burgos, Villagonzalo Pedernales 233, 232 BU-V-1002 Villariezo, Arcos de la Llana 230 N-234 Soria, Sarracín Services near Sarracín 225 Services near Revillarruz, Revillarruz 223, 221 Cogollos 219 Valdorros 216 BU-V-9012 Madrigal del Monte, Hontoria de la Cantera (N-234), Cubillo del Campo (N-234) 215 Parking near Madrigalejo del Monte (only northbound) 214 BU-V-1012 Montuenga, Villangómez (only southbound) 213 BU-V-1411 Madrigalejo del Monte, Villamayor de los Montes 210 BU-V-1013 Villamayor de los Montes, Torrecilla del Monte 204 Villalmanzo, pol. industrial (only southbound) 203 N-622, BU-904 Lerma, Tordómar, Salas de los Infantes (BU-904), Palencia (A-62) 202 Lerma-centro, Lerma train station 200 Lerma-sur, Santo Domingo de Silos (only northbound) 198 BU-114 Quintanilla de la Mata, Villafruela 196 Quintanilla de la Mata (only northbound) 189 BU-V-1106, BU-V-9190 Fontioso, Cilleruelo de Abajo Services near Granja Guimara 185 BU-130, BU-V-9204 Cabañes de Esgueva, Roa, Pineda-Trasmonte, Sotillo de la Ribera 182 Bahabón de Esgueva, Santibáñez de Esgueva, Cabañes de Esgueva, Torresandino (only southbound) 180 Bahabón de Esgueva, Santibáñez de Esgueva, Cabañes de Esgueva, Torresandino 176 BU-V-1104, BU-V-9203 Oquillas, Pinilla Trasmonte, Gumiel de Mercado, La Aguilera, Quintana del Pidio 171 Gumiel de Izán, Caleruega, Quintana del Pidio, Gumiel de Mercado, Tubilla del Lago 168 Villanueva de Gumiel, Quemada, Zazuar, Peñaranda de Duero 165, 164 N-1 Aranda de Duero-Norte, Monte Costaján, Segovia (CL-603) 159 CL-619 Aranda de Duero, Villalba de Duero, La Horra, Palencia 158 N-122 Aranda de Duero-Centro, Castrillo de la Vega, Valladolid, Soria	Burgos Vitoria-Gasteiz Bilbao	Aranda de Duero Madrid
(European Union) (Spain) Castile and León Burgos	Autovía A-1 motorway Autovía del Norte	Aranda de Duero – Pardilla	154 A-11 Valladolid, Soria, Aranda de Duero-Sur (N-1) 153, 152 N-1 Fuentespina, Aranda de Duero Services near Milagros 147, 146 N-1 Milagros 144, 143 BU-202 Pardilla, Fuentenebro, Moradillo de Roa	Aranda de Duero Burgos	Madrid
Segovia	Autovía A-1 motorway Autovía del Norte	Pardilla – Santo Tomé del Puerto	140 SG-A-9321 Honrubia de la Cuesta, Villaverde de Montejo, Valdevacas de Montejo 137, 136 SG-A-9321 Honrubia de la Cuesta, Villaverde de Montejo, Valdevacas de Montejo 134, 133 BU-V-9321 Villalvilla de Montejo 131, 130 SG-V-2414 Pradales, Aldeanueva de la Serrezuela, Cedillo de la Torre 124 Fresno de la Fuente, Grajera (only southbound) 123 SG-V-9111 Fresno de la Fuente, Grajera (only northbound) 121 Encinas 118 N-1, SG-V-9112 Boceguillas, Grajera, Aldeonte (only southbound) 117, 116 N-1, SG-232 Boceguillas, Sepúlveda, Barbolla 115 N-1 Boceguillas (only northbound) weight station near Castillejo de Mesleón 110 SG-234, SG-911 Sepúlveda, Riaza, Castillejo de Mesleón (only southbound) 109 Castillejo de Mesleón (only northbound) 107 Sotillo, Soto de Sepúlveda 104, 103 N-110, SG-205 Cerezo de Abajo, Riaza, Burgo de Osma-Ciudad de Osma, Soria, Cantalejo, Cuéllar 100 N-110, SG-205 Cerezo de Abajo, Riaza, Burgo de Osma-Ciudad de Osma, Soria, Cantalejo, Cuéllar (only northbound) 99 N-110 Santo Tomé del Puerto, Casla, Prádena, Segovia	Aranda de Duero Burgos	Madrid
(European Union) (Spain) Community of Madrid	Autovía A-1 motorway Autovía del Norte	Santo Tomé del Puerto – Madrid	92 N-1 Somosierra, Robregordo (only southbound) 91 N-1 Somosierra, Robregordo (only northbound) 87 N-1 Robregordo, La Acebeda 85 M-141 Horcajo de la Sierra, Horcajuelo de la Sierra, Montejo de la Sierra 83 M-136, M-978 Horcajo de la Sierra, La Acebeda, Aoslos Service near La Serna del Monte (only southbound) 79 M-132, M-636 La Serna del Monte, Piñuécar-Gandullas, Gascones 76 N-1 Buitrago del Lozoya, Piñuécar-Gandullas (only northbound) 75 M-634 Buitrago del Lozoya, Villavieja del Lozoya 74 N-1, M-126 Buitrago del Lozoya, Manjirón 69 M-604 Lozoya, Rascafría, Gargantilla del Lozoya y Pinilla de Buitrago 68 M-135 Lozoyuela-Navas-Sieteiglesias (only southbound) 67 M-135 Lozoyuela-Navas-Sieteiglesias (only northbound) 66 M-131 Lozoyuela-Navas-Sieteiglesias, El Berrueco 65 Service near Lozoyuela-Navas-Sieteiglesias 60 N-1, M-127 La Cabrera, El Berrueco 57 N-1, M-124, M-610 La Cabrera, Valdemanco, Torrelaguna, Bustarviejo 55 N-1, M-631 Cabanillas de la Sierra, Bustarviejo, Navalafuente (only southbound) 50 N-1, N-320 Venturada, Guadalix de la Sierra, Torrelaguna, Soto del Real, Guadalajara 49 Cotos de Monterrey 47 M-122 El Vellón, Pedrezuela, El Molar-Norte 45 M-129 El Vellón, El Molar-Centro 41 N-1 El Molar-Sur, Pedrezuela 36 San Agustín del Guadalix 34 M-104 San Agustín del Guadalix, Colmenar Viejo 30 Polígono industrial sur Services near Santo Domingo (only southbound) 28 Urbanizaciones Santo Domingo & Ciudalcampo 26 Services near Santo Domingo (only northbound) 24 M-100 San Sebastián de los Reyes, Fuente del Fresno, Algete, Cobeña 23 M-100 San Sebastián de los Reyes, Algete, Cobeña (only northbound) 21 M-50, M-45, R2 Madrid, Adolfo Suárez Madrid–Barajas Airport, Torrejón de Ardoz, Guadalajara (A-2), Zaragoza (A-2) 20 San Sebastián de los Reyes (only northbound) 19 San Sebastián de los Reyes (only northbound) 17 M-12, R-2 Alcobendas, San Sebastián de los Reyes, Adolfo Suárez Madrid–Barajas Airport 16 M-616, M-607 Alcobendas 15 Alcobendas, Fuencarral-El Pardo (only southbound) 14 Alcobendas-Oeste, El Soto (only northbound) 13 M-40 Madrid, Adolfo Suárez Madrid–Barajas Airport, Zaragoza (A-2), Valencia (A-3), Albacete (AP-36), Murcia (AP-36), Ciudad Real (A-4), Granada (A-4), Seville (A-4), Toledo (A-42), Badajoz (A-5), Valladolid (A-6), A Coruña (A-6)	Aranda de Duero Burgos	Madrid
(European Union) (Spain) Community of Madrid	Autopista de Circunvalación M-40 Ring road of Madrid	Madrid	2-B R-2 Adolfo Suárez Madrid–Barajas Airport, Zaragoza (only northbound) 2-B M-11 Adolfo Suárez Madrid–Barajas Airport, Madrid (M-30) (only southbound) 3 M-11 Madrid (only northbound) 5 Madrid-Hortaleza 6 Madrid-Canillas 7 Madrid-Palomas 8 Madrid-Barajas (only southbound) 8 M-12 Adolfo Suárez Madrid–Barajas Airport, Zaragoza (R-2), Burgos (A-1) (only northbound) 9ab M-21, E90, Madrid-Canillejas, Estadio Metropolitano de Madrid, Torrejón de Ardoz, Alcalá de Henares, Coslada, San Fernando de Henares, Adolfo Suárez Madrid–Barajas Airport, Zaragoza (A-2) 10 M-201 Madrid-Rosas, Coslada 12 Madrid-Arcos, Madrid-Vicálvaro (only southbound) 13 R-3 Madrid, Mejorada del Campo, Arganda del Rey, Valencia (A-3) 14 Madrid-Moratalaz, Madrid-Vicálvaro (only northbound) 15ab A-3, E901 Rivas-Vaciamadrid, Arganda del Rey, Tarancón, Valencia, Albacete (A-31), Cuenca (A-40) 16 Madrid-Villa de Vallecas 19a Madris-Puente de Vallecas, Mercamadrid market (only southbound) 19(b) M-31, M-45, M-50 Cordobá (R-4), Getafe, Parla, Fuenlabrada 20 Madrid-Villa de Vallecas, Mercamadrid market (only northbound) 21ab A-4 Madrid, Getafe, Cordobá, Seville, Albacete (AP-36), Murcia (AP-36), Granada (A-44), Ciudad Real (A-43), Toledo (A-42), Badajoz (A-5), Valladolid (A-6), A Coruña (A-6)	Burgos Zaragoza Bilbao A Coruña	Valencia Cordobá Murcia Málaga Seville
(European Union) (Spain) Community of Madrid	Autovía A-4 motorway Autovía del Sur	Madrid – Ciempozuelos	9, 12b M-45 Madrid-Villa de Vallecas, Madrid-Villaverde, Leganés, Alcorcón 12a Madrid-Centro (only northbound) Services near Getafe 13 M-406 Getafe, Cerro de los Ángeles, Getafe-Perales del Río Los Ángeles services 16 Parque empresarial (only northbound) 17a Área empresarial Andalucía (only southbound) 17(b) M-50 Adolfo Suárez Madrid–Barajas Airport, Torrejón de Ardoz, Getafe, Leganés, Alcorcón, Móstoles, Fuenlabrada 18 Industrial area in Pinto (only northbound) 17 Área empresarial Andalucía (only northbound) 20 M-841 Pinto, San Martín de la Vega 22 M-506 Pinto, San Martín de la Vega, Parla, Fuenlabrada, Móstoles, Córdoba (via R-4) 23 M-423 Zona industrial 24 Poligono industrial Valdemoro 26a Valdemoro-Norte (only southbound) 26(b) Valdemoro-Centro 27, 28 Valdemoro-Sur 29 M-404 Valdemoro-Sur, Ciempozuelos, Navalcarnero, Torrejón de la Calzada, Córdoba (via R-4), Madrid (via R-4) 32, 34 Vía de servicio	Madrid	Ciudad Real Córdoba Murcia
(European Union) (Spain) Castilla–La Mancha Toledo	Autovía A-4 motorway Autovía del Sur	Ciempozuelos – Seseña	36 CM-4010 Seseña, Illescas, Madrid (via R-4) 37 M-305 Aranjuez-Norte (only southbound) 39 M-305, M-307 Aranjuez-Norte, Ciempozuelos 44 CM-4001a Añover de Tajo, Toledo, Madrid (via R-4)	Madrid	Ciudad Real Córdoba Murcia
(European Union) (Spain) Community of Madrid	Autovía A-4 motorway Autovía del Sur	Seseña – Aranjuez	47 M-416 Aranjuez-Centro, Córdoba (via R-4), Madrid (via R-4)	Madrid	Ciudad Real Córdoba Murcia
(European Union) (Spain) Castilla–La Mancha Toledo	Autovía A-4 motorway Autovía del Sur	Aranjuez – Ocaña	52 N-400 Aranjuez-Sur, Toledo, Ontígola 53, 54 Ontígola, Vía de servicio 61 N-400, CM-4014 Ocaña, Yepes, Noblejas 62 A-40 Tarancón, Cuenca, Valencia (A-3), Albacete (N-301), Madrid (R-4) 65, 66 R-4, AP-36 Madrid, Aranjuez, Toledo (N-400), Albacete (A-31), Alicante (A-31), Murcia (A-30)	Madrid	Ciudad Real Córdoba Murcia
(European Union) (Spain) Castilla–La Mancha Toledo	Autovía A-4 motorway Autovía del Sur	Ocaña – Puerto Lápice	69, 70 TO-2657 Dosbarrios, Noblejas Services near Dosbarrios 72 Dosbarrios (only northbound) 79 Parking near La Guardia 81, 83 CM-3005, CM-4006 La Guardia, Lillo, Huerta de Valdecarábanos 85 near La Guardia 92 CM-410, CM-3000 Tembleque-Norte, Mora, El Romeral (only southbound) 93 CM-410, CM-3000 Tembleque-Centro, Mora, El Romeral, Villacañas 94 CM-410, CM-3000 Tembleque-Sur, Mora, El Romeral, Villacañas (only northbound) 98 CM-4056 Turleque Services near Turleque 106, 107 Services near Turleque 112 Services near Madridejos 115 Madridejos-Norte (only southbound) 118 CM-3128 Madridejos-Centro, Villacañas 119 CM-400 Madridejos-Sur, Camuñas, Consuegra 121 CM-42 Madridejos, Consuegra, Toledo, Alcázar de San Juan, Tomelloso Services near Puerto Lápice	Madrid	Ciudad Real Córdoba Granada
Ciudad Real	Autovía A-4 motorway Autovía del Sur	Puerto Lápice – Manzanares	135 CM-420 Puerto Lápice, Herencia, Alcázar de San Juan, Cuenca 136, 137 CM-240 Arenas de San Juan, Villarrubia de los Ojos, Daimiel, Ciudad Real 140 Services near Puerto Lápice Parking near Villarta de San Juan 144 CM-3105, CR-1342 Villarta de San Juan-Norte, Herencia 147 CM-3113, CM-4126 Villarta de San Juan-Centro, Arenas de San Juan, Villarrubia de los Ojos, Argamasilla de Alba, Tomelloso 149 Villarta de San Juan-Sur (only northbound) 153 Services near Villarta de San Juan (only southbound) 155 Vía de servicio 159 CR-1414 Herencia (only northbound) 160 CR-1513 Llanos del Caudillo 162 Services near Llanos del Caudillo 167 Vía de servicio 170 A-43, E903 Ciudad Real, Daimiel, Manzanares-Norte, Tomelloso, Albacete	Madrid	Jaén Córdoba Granada
Ciudad Real	Autovía A-4 motorway Autovía del Sur	Manzanares – Santa Elena	162 Services near Manzanares 174 N-430 Manzanares-Centro, Ciudad Real (A-43) (only northbound) 175, 176 CM-9313, CM-4124 Manzanares-Sur, Almagro, Bolaños de Calatrava, Moral de Calatrava 178 Vía de servicio 179 Services near Manzanares (only northbound) 180, 181 CRP-6032 Membrilla 184 Consolación-Norte 179 Services near Consolación (only southbound) 186 CRP-5214 Consolación-Sur 191 Services near Valdepeñas El Hidalgo services 197 Valdepeñas-Norte 199 Valdepeñas, Vía de servicio (only northbound) 200, 201 CM-412, CM-4117 Valdepeñas-Centro/Sur, Ciudad Real, Alcaraz, Moral de Calatrava, Almagro, Daimiel, Villanueva de los Infantes 202 Vía de servicio 205 Vía de servicio 208 CM-3157, CR-5221 Valdepeñas-Sur 210 Services near Valdepeñas Parking near Santa Cruz de Mudela 213, 214 CR-613, CM-4122, CR-5222 Santa Cruz de Mudela-Norte, Torrenueva, Calzada de Calatrava, Moral de Calatrava 216 CR-5222, CM-4122 Santa Cruz de Mudela, Moral de Calatrava, Calzada de Calatrava, Bazán 217 Santa Cruz de Mudela 220 CR-6102 Las Virtudes 210 Services near Santa Cruz de Mudela (only southbound) 223 Bazán 227 Vía de servicio 230 CM-3200 Almuradiel-Norte, Castellar de Santiago (only southbound) 231 Almuradiel-Centro (only southbound) 232 CM-4111, CM-3200 Almuradiel-Sur, Castellar de Santiago, Viso del Marqués (only northbound) 234 Vía de servicio Parking near Almuradiel (only southbound) 241 Venta de Cárdenas 243, 244 N-IVa Venta de Cárdenas, Despeñaperros national park	Madrid Ciudad Real	Jaén Córdoba Granada
(European Union) (Spain) Andalusia Jaén	Autovía A-4 motorway Autovía del Sur	Santa Elena – Bailén	250, 252 N-IVa, A-6200 Aldeaquemada, Despeñaperros national park 257 N-IVa, JV-5021 Santa Elena-Norte, Miranda del Rey 258 JA-7100, J-5020 Santa Elena-Centro, La Aliseda (only southbound) 259 J-6120 Santa Elena-Sur (only northbound) 262 Services near Santa Elena 264 JA-7100 Navas de Tolosa, La Aliseda (only southbound) 265 Services near La Carolina (only southbound) 266 A-301, A-6106 La Carolina-Norte, Vilches, Navas de Tolosa 268 A-6106 La Carolina-Centro, Vilches, Arquillos 269 services near La Carolina (only southbound) 270 JA-6100 La Carolina-Sur, El Centenillo 274 Carboneros, El Acebuchar (only southbound) 275 JV-6033 Carboneros, La Mesa 280 JV-5043 Los Ríos, El Altico, Guarromán-Norte 283 A-303 Guarromán, Linares 285, 286 Services near Guarromán 288 A-601 Baños de la Encina, Linares 292 A-44, E902, N-322 Bailén, Jaén, Granada, Málaga (A-7), Almería (A-7), Linares (A-32), Úbeda (A-32), Albacete (A-32)	Madrid Ciudad Real	Jaén Córdoba Granada
(European Union) (Spain) Andalusia Jaén	Autovía A-4 motorway Autovía del Sur	Bailén – Villa del Río	299 Bailén, El Burguillo 301 JV-3151 Zocueca Services near Bailén 303 JV-3151, J-2320 La Esperanza Cubana 310 A-6075, J-2320 Villanueva de la Reina, Mengíbar 312 La Quintería 316, 317 Los Villares de Andújar, La Parrilla 318 Vía servicio (only southbound) 319 Vía servicio 321 Andújar 323 A-311 Andújar, Jaén, Arjona, Lahiguera, Martos 324, 325 Andújar, Andújar industrial area, Andújar railway station 326 Llanos del Sotillo 329 A-420, J-205 Marmolejo, Arjonilla 335 J-514 Marmolejo, Arjonilla 339 JV-5103 San Julián 346 A-6175, J-205 Lopera, Arjonilla	Madrid Ciudad Real	Córdoba Málaga Seville
Córdoba	Autovía A-4 motorway Autovía del Sur	Villa del Río – Córdoba	348 A-3101, CP-126 Villa del Río, Cañete de las Torres 350 CP-180 Villa del Río, La Vega, Bujalance 356 Huertos familiares de San Fernando 358, 359 N-420, A-309 Montoro, Bujalance, Ciudad Real 361 Montoro 364 CO-3102, A-3000 Adamuz, Algallarín 367, 370 N-IV, CO-4102, CP-117, CO-3107 Pedro Abad, Adamuz, Alcurrucen, Bujalance 374 El Carpio 377 A-421, A-306 Villafranca de Córdoba, El Carpio, Adamuz, Jaén 383 CP-263 Alcolea, Bujalance 385 CO-3109 Santa Cruz 391 CO-3105 Alcolea, Córdoba prison Services near Córdoba 396 El Levigar 398,399 N-41, CO-31 Córdoba-Norte, Alcolea, Peñarroya-Pueblonuevo, Pozoblanco, Badajoz (N-432) 400 Córdoba – Carrer Virgen del Mar 401 Córdoba – Centro Histórico 403, 404 A-431, N-432 Córdoba-Sur, Baena, Granada 406 A-3050 Córdoba-Oeste 409 A-45, CO-32 Córdoba-Oeste, Córdoba Airport, Montilla, Lucena, Antequera, Málaga	Madrid Ciudad Real	Seville Cádiz
Córdoba	Autovía A-4 motorway Autovía del Sur	Córdoba – La Carlota	Services near Córdoba 418 N-331 Fernán Núñez, Montilla, Málaga 420 CO-3304 Guadalcázar 424 N-IV, A-3052 Aldea Quintana, La Victoria, La Rambla 430 CP-327 El Arrecife, El Rinconcillo, La Chica Carlota, La Fuencubierta 432 A-445 La Carlota-Norte, Posadas, Palma del Río, Fuente Palmera 434 N-IV La Carlota-Sur	Madrid Córdoba	Seville Cádiz
Seville	Autovía A-4 motorway Autovía del Sur	La Carlota – Seville	437 Los Algarbes 441 A-386, SE-9103 Santaella, Montalbán de Córdoba, La Rambla, Montilla, Fuente Palmera Services near Cerro Perea 443, 444 Cerro Perea 450 N-IVa, A-453, SE-9105 Écija, Palma del Río, Lucena, Santaella 455 A-351, A-388 Écija, Osuna, Estepa, Puente Genil, El Rubio Services near Écija (only northbound) 457 A-364 Marchena, Arahal (A-92), Utrera 461 Villanueva del Rey 464 Parque Emresarial La Luisiana Services near La Luisiana (only northbound) 468 SE-9104 La Luisiana, El Campillo, Cañada Rosal, Palma del Río 471 La Luisiana, El Campillo, Cañada Rosal, Palma del Río 482 A-456, A-407 La Campana, Fuentes de Andalucía, Lantejuela, Osuna, Lora del Río Services near Fuentes de Andalucía Services Las Cumbres (only southbound) 498 SE-6103 La Campana, Palma del Río 500 SE-226 Fuentes de Andalucía 504 N-IVa, A-380 Carmona-Este, Marchena, Arahal 506 A-457, SE-4107 Carmona-Norte, Lora del Río, Alcolea del Río 508 A-462 Carmona-Centro, Brenes 511 N-IVa, A-398 Carmona-Oeste, El Viso del Alcor, Mairena del Alcor 514 SE-3201 Tocina, El Viso del Alcor 516 Las Monjas, Matallana 519 Los Nietos, El Chaparral 521 A-8025, SE-3105 Mairena del Alcor, Brenes 523 El Secorro, Pino Grande, Torrepalma 524 Torrepalma (only northbound) 526 SE-40 Granada (A-92), Málaga (A-92), Utrera (A-376), Alcalá de Guadaíra, Dos Hermanas 528 P.E. Aeronáutico, Club de Campo 530 P.I. Los Espartales (only southbound) 532 Seville Airport 533 Seville Airport (only northbound)	Madrid Córdoba	Seville Cádiz
Seville	Autovía A-4 motorway Autovía del Sur	Seville	535 SE-20 Seville-Este, Brenes (A-8008), La Rinconada (A-8008), Huelva (A-49), Mérida (A-66) (only southbound) Services near Seville 536, 537 Seville ring road Seville-Norte, Mérida (A-66) 0 Seville-Centro, Avenida Kansas City, Seville-Santa Justa railway station, Mérida (A-66) (only northbound) 1 Seville-Centro, Seville-Este, Avenida Montes Sierra 2 A-92 Seville-Centro, Mercasevilla, Granada (A-92), Málaga (A-92), Antequera (A-92), Alcalá de Guadaíra (A-92) 3 La Negrilla train station, Palmete, Amate 4 Su Eminencia, La Plata, Padre Pío (only southbound) 5 A-8028, A-92 Padre Pío, Palmete, Torreblanca, Alcalá de Guadaíra (only northbound) 6 A-376 Seville-Centro, Avenida de La Paz, Pablo de Olavide University, Utrera 8 N-IV Seville-Centro, Avenida La Palmera, Bellavista, Dos Hermanas 9, 554 SE-30 Seville-Oeste, Port of Seville, Mairena del Aljarafe, San Juan de Aznalfarache, Tomares, Huelva (A-49), Mérida (A-66), Córdoba, Madrid, Portugal (Faro) 549 Pol. ind. La Isla 549 SE-40, SE-31 Seville-Oeste, Dos Hermanas, Alcalá de Guadaíra, Seville Airport, Córdoba (A-4), Madrid (A-4), Granada (A-92), Málaga (A-92)	Madrid Córdoba	Jerez de la Frontera Cádiz
Seville	Autovía A-4 motorway Autovía del Sur	Seville – Dos Hermanas	553 SE-3205 Isla Minor, Dos Hermanas-Centro 558 N-IV, A-4 Dos Hermanas-Sur, Los Palacios y Villafranca (only southbound)	Córdoba Seville	Jerez de la Frontera Cádiz
Seville	Autopista AP-4 Autopista del sur	Dos Hermanas – El Cuervo de Sevilla	15 N-IV Dos Hermanas (only northbound) Los Palacios services (only southbound) 23, 24 N-IVa, A-362 Los Palacios y Villafranca, Utrera El Fantasma services (only northbound) 44, 45 A-417, A-417R, A-371 Las Cabezas de San Juan, Lebrija, Villamartín, Sanlúcar de Barrameda 53 N-IV El Cuervo de Sevilla, Lebrija (only southbound)	Córdoba Seville	Jerez de la Frontera Cádiz
Cádiz	Autopista AP-4 Autopista del sur	El Cuervo de Sevilla – Jerez de la Frontera	El Cuadrejón services 79 N-349, A-4 Jerez de la Frontera-Norte, Jerez Airport, Sanlúcar de Barrameda 80 A-382 Circuito de Jerez, Arcos de la Frontera, Ronda	Córdoba Seville	Jerez de la Frontera Cádiz
Cádiz	Autopista AP-4 Autopista del sur	Jerez de la Frontera – Puerto Real	84, 85 A-381 Jerez de la Frontera-Sur, El Puerto de Santa María, Medina-Sidonia, Los Barrios, Algeciras 101, 658 A-4, CA-3113 Cádiz, El Puerto de Santa María, Jerez de la Frontera, Seville, Algeciras, San Fernando, Chiclana de la Frontera, Puerto Real	Seville Jerez de la Frontera	Algeciras Cádiz
Cádiz	Autovía A-4 motorway Autovía del Sur	Puerto Real – San Fernando	658 A-408 Puerto Real, Paterna de Rivera (only northbound) 660 CA-2302 Puerto Real, Puerto Real Hospital 664 CA-3205 Jarana 668 CA-33 San Fernando, Cádiz 668, 1 A-48 Chiclana de la Frontera, Algeciras, Conil de la Frontera, Jerez de la Frontera, Seville	Seville Jerez de la Frontera Cádiz	Algeciras
Cádiz	Autovía A-48 motorway Autovía Costa de la Luz	San Fernando – Vejer de la Frontera	2 Bahía de Cádiz Natural Park 3 CA-2104 Chiclana de la Frontera-Centro, El Marquesado 7 A-390 Chiclana de la Frontera-Este, Medina-Sidonia 10 N-340a Chiclana de la Frontera-Sur, Poblado de Sancti Petri, La Barrosa Playa 15 N-340, CA-9001 El Colorado, Roche, La Barrosa Playa 19 CA-2022, CA-4201, CA-2146 El Colorado, Barrio Nuevo, Los Naveros, Medina-Sidonia Services near Conil de la Frontera 26 N-340, A-2232 Conil de la Frontera 30 N-340, CA-4200 Conil de la Frontera, La Muela de Vejer 36 N-340, CA-2142, A-2230, A-2229 Vejer de la Frontera, Los Caños de Meca	Seville Jerez de la Frontera Cádiz	Algeciras
Cádiz	N-340 road	Vejer de la Frontera – Algeciras	A-396 Medina-Sidonia, Benalup-Casas Viejas A-314 Vejer de la Frontera, Barbate A-227 Zahara de los Atunes Tahivilla CA-221 Facinas, Los Barrios, Los Alcornocales Natural Park CA-7201 Facinas, Los Barrios, Los Alcornocales Natural Park CA-8202 Bolonia A-2325 Punta Paloma Valdevaqueros CA-9210 Cañada de la Jara, Los Alcornocales Natural Park Tarifa El Bujeo El Pelayo CA-224 Getares Playa A-7, E15, N-350 Algeciras, Cádiz, Jerez de la Frontera, Seville, Málaga, Marbella, Los Barrios, San Roque, La Línea de la Concepción, United Kingdom (Gibraltar)	Seville Jerez de la Frontera Cádiz	Málaga Algeciras
