= Gandulla =

Gandulla is a surname. Notable people with the surname include:

- Arialis Gandulla (born 1995), Cuban sprinter
- Bernardo Gandulla (1916–1999), Argentine footballer and manager

== See also ==
- Piñuécar-Gandullas, a municipality of the Community of Madrid, Spain
