= Valdevacas de Montejo =

- Municipality
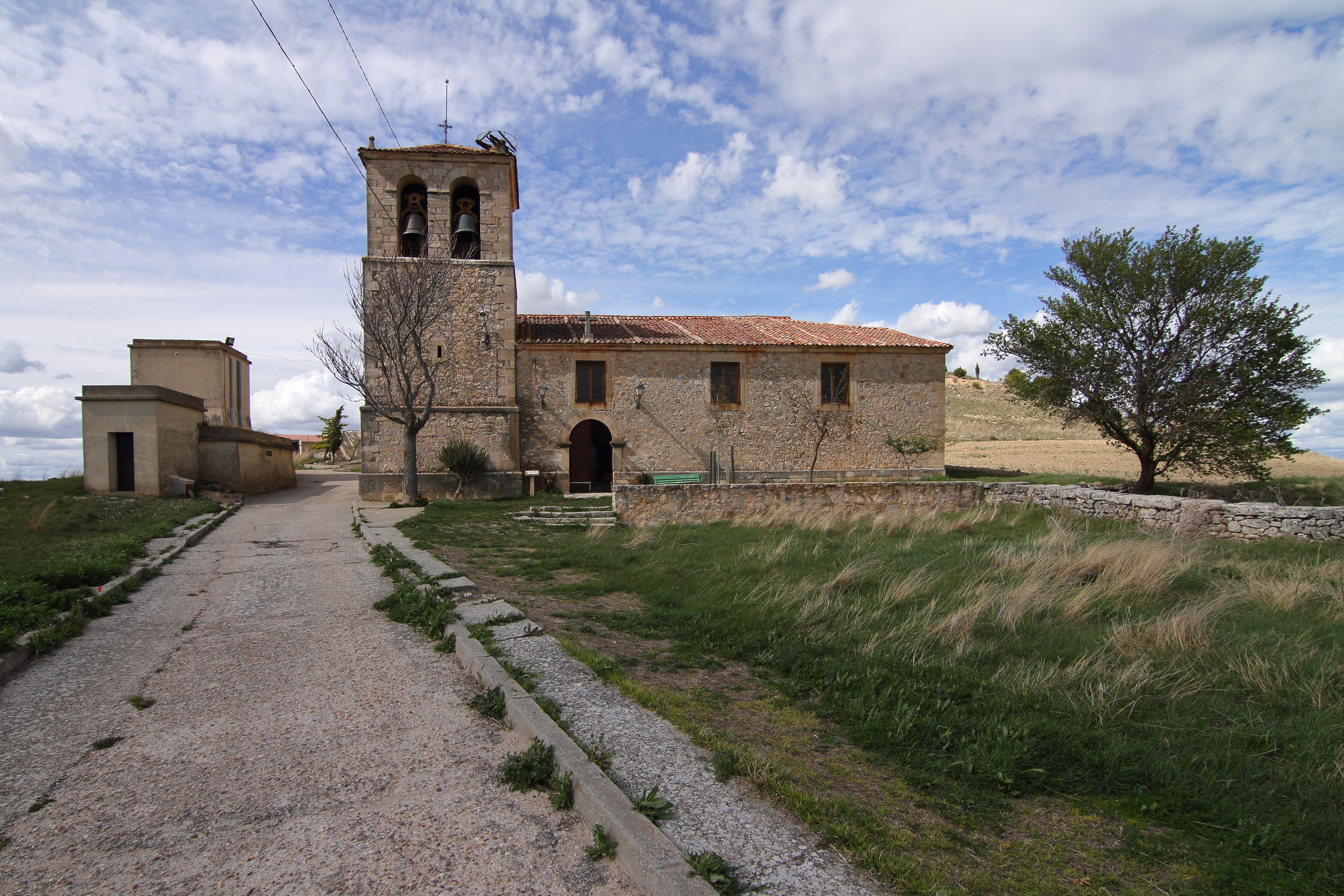

- Location in Spain. Valdevacas de Montejo (Spain)
- Coordinates: 41°31′15″N 3°38′10″W
- Country: Spain
- Autonomous community: Castile and León
- Province: Segovia
- Municipality: Valdevacas de Montejo

Area
  - Total: 17 km^{2} (6.6 sq mi)

Population (2025-01-01)
  - Total: 29
  - Density: 1.7/km^{2} (4.4/sq mi)
- Time zone: UTC+1 (CET)
  - Summer (DST): UTC+2 (CEST)
- Website: Official website

Valdevacas de Montejo is a municipality located in the province of Segovia, Castile and León, Spain. According to the 2004 census (INE), the municipality has a population of 29 inhabitants.
