= Castillejo de Mesleón =

- Municipality
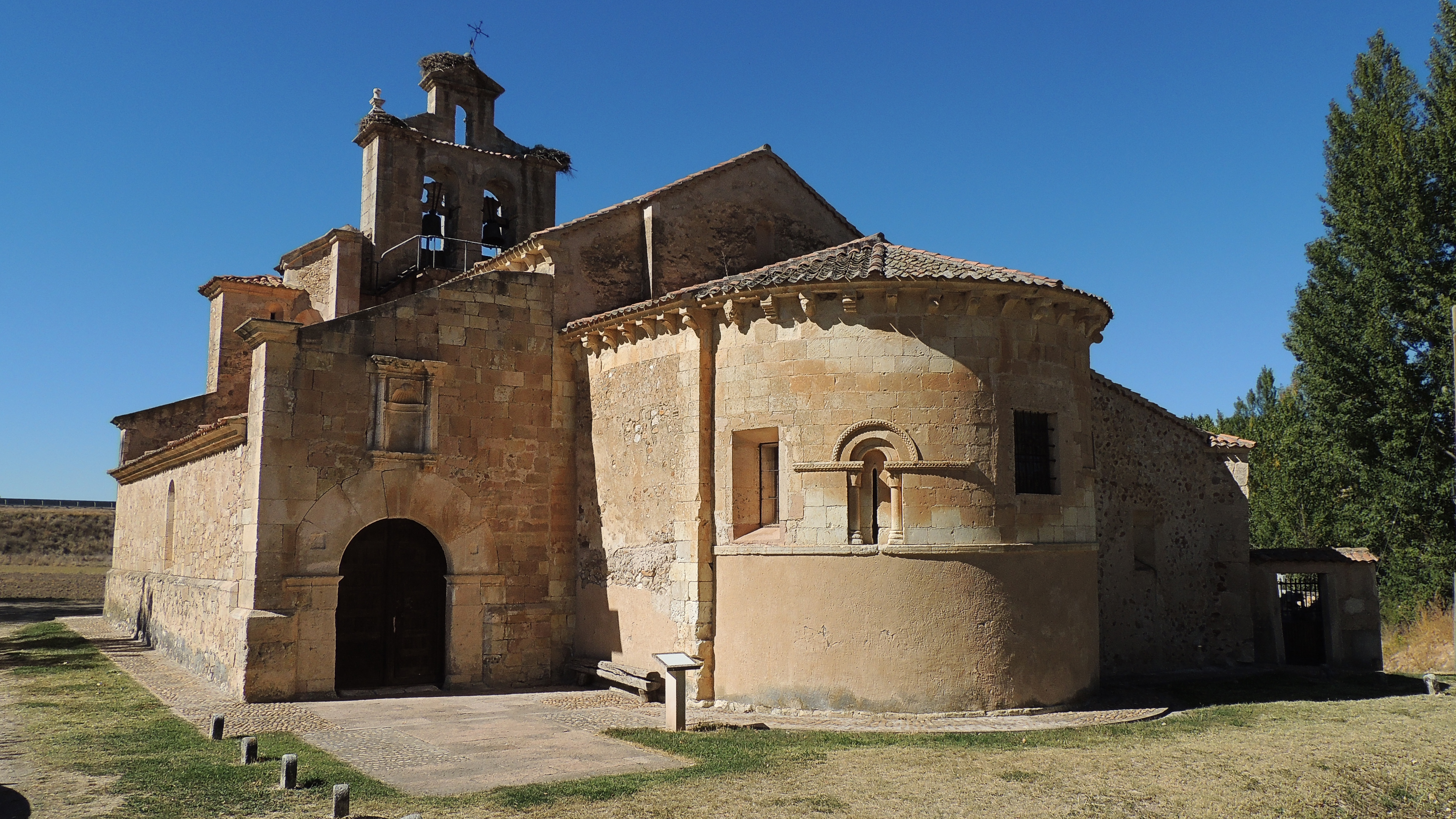
- Church of Nuestra Señora de la Asunción.

- Location in Spain. Castillejo de Mesleón (Spain)
- Coordinates: 41°16′50″N 3°36′05″W
- Country: Spain
- Autonomous community: Castile and León
- Province: Segovia
- Comarca: Villa y Tierra de Sepúlveda

Government
  - Mayor: Susana de las monjas (la susan)

Area
  - Total: 27.24 km^{2} (10.52 sq mi)
- Elevation: 1,003 m (3,291 ft)

Population (2025-01-01)
  - Total: 119
  - Density: 4.37/km^{2} (11.3/sq mi)
- Demonym: Castillejanos
- Time zone: UTC+1 (CET)
  - Summer (DST): UTC+2 (CEST)
- Postal code: 40593
- Website: Official website

Castillejo de Mesleón is a municipality located in the province of Segovia, Castile and León, Spain.
