= Robregordo =

- Municipality
- Flag Coat of arms

- Municipal location within the Community of Madrid.

- Location in Spain
- Coordinates: 41°6′16″N 3°35′42″W
- Country: Spain
- Autonomous community: Community of Madrid

Area
  - Total: 6.96 sq mi (18.03 km^{2})
- Elevation: 4,262 ft (1,299 m)

Population (2025-01-01)
  - Total: 79
  - Density: 11/sq mi (4.4/km^{2})
- Time zone: UTC+1 (CET)
  - Summer (DST): UTC+2 (CEST)

Robregordo is a municipality of the Community of Madrid, Spain.

== Public transport ==
The only way to arrive Robregordo are with the following bus lines:

Line 191. Madrid (Plaza de Castilla) - Buitrago del Lozoya

Line 191B. Buitrago del Lozoya - Somosierra

Until 2011 the village had a station named Robregordo-Somosierra (although it didn’t gave service to Somosierra), however, a landslide in the nearby Somosierra tunnel, added to the poor state of the infrastructure for years, caused the train service to be permanently suspended.
