= Honrubia de la Cuesta =

- Municipality
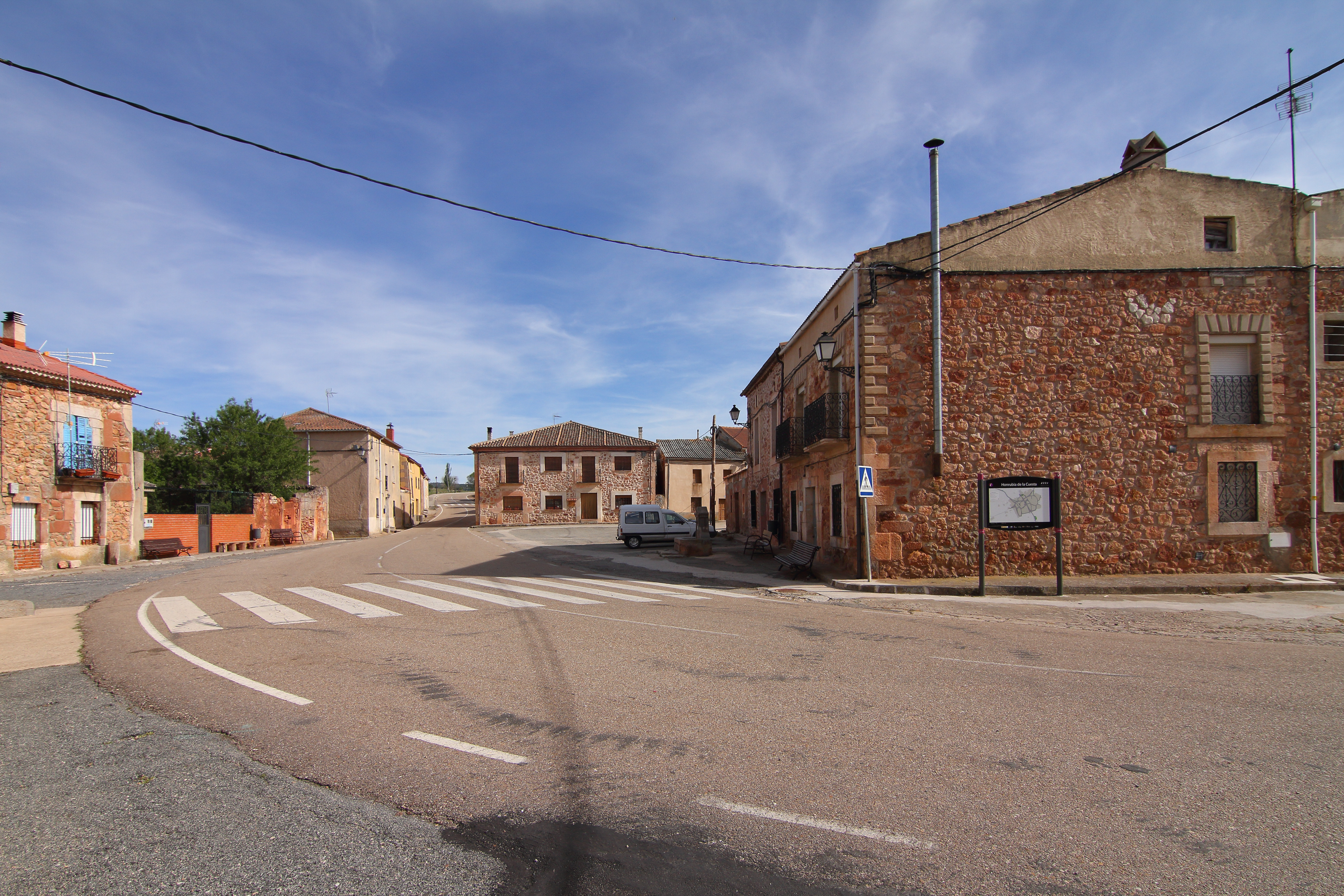
- Honrubia de la Cuesta - calle Real

- Location in Spain. Honrubia de la Cuesta (Spain)
- Coordinates: 41°30′38″N 3°42′16″W
- Country: Spain
- Autonomous community: Castile and León
- Province: Segovia
- Municipality: Honrubia de la Cuesta

Area
  - Total: 20 km^{2} (7.7 sq mi)

Population (2025-01-01)
  - Total: 49
  - Density: 2.5/km^{2} (6.3/sq mi)
- Time zone: UTC+1 (CET)
  - Summer (DST): UTC+2 (CEST)
- Website: Official website

Honrubia de la Cuesta is a municipality located in the province of Segovia, Castile and León, Spain. According to the 2004 census (INE), the municipality has a population of 91 inhabitants.
