= Fresno de la Fuente =

- Municipality
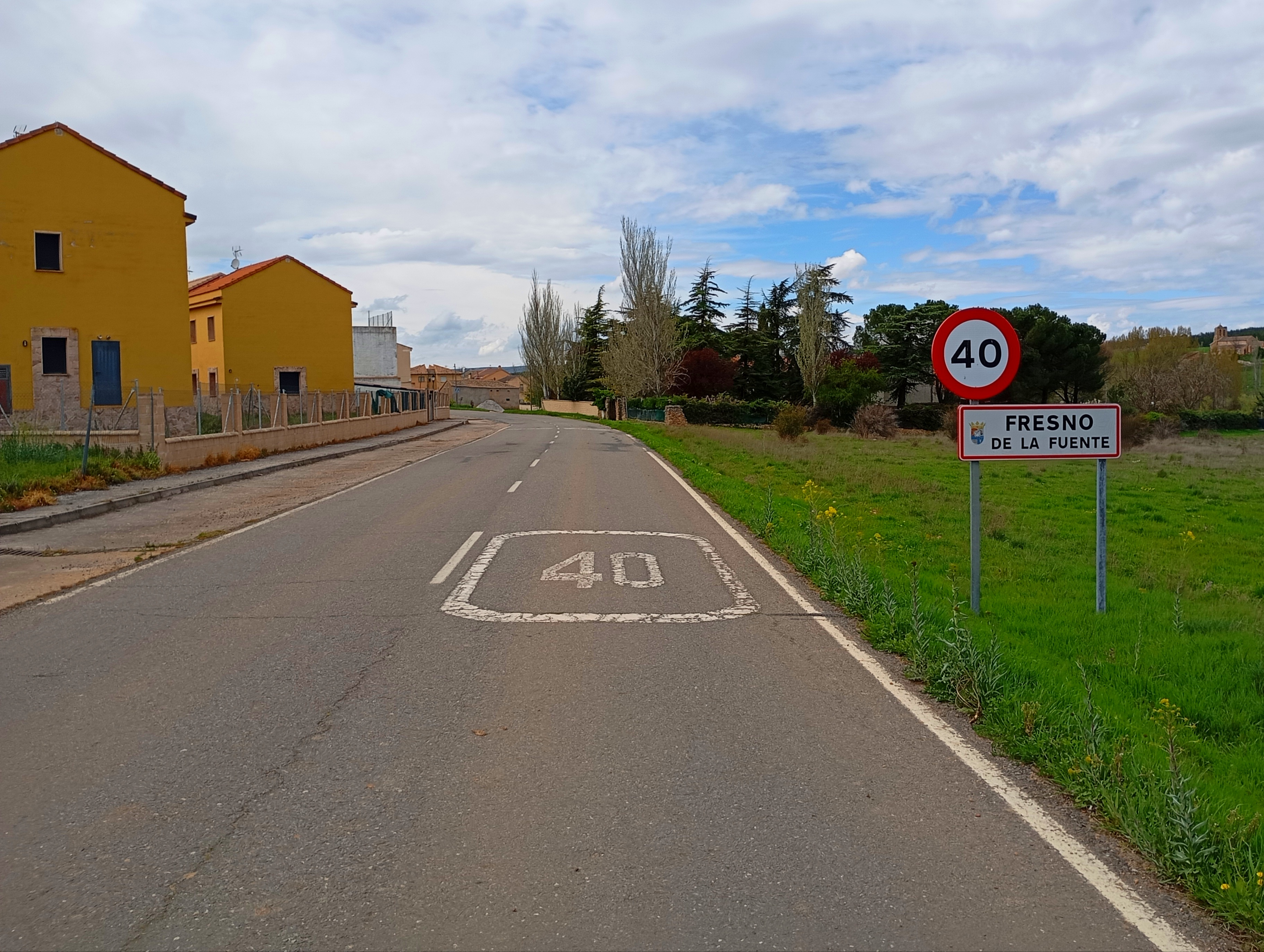
- Name of the municipality on the sign indicating the entrance to the urbanized area

- Location in Spain. Fresno de la Fuente (Spain)
- Coordinates: 41°23′33″N 3°38′39″W
- Country: Spain
- Autonomous community: Castile and León
- Province: Segovia
- Municipality: Fresno de la Fuente

Area
  - Total: 17 km^{2} (6.6 sq mi)

Population (2025-01-01)
  - Total: 75
  - Density: 4.4/km^{2} (11/sq mi)
- Time zone: UTC+1 (CET)
  - Summer (DST): UTC+2 (CEST)
- Website: Official website

Fresno de la Fuente is a municipality located in the province of Segovia, Castile and León, Spain. According to the 2004 census (INE), the municipality has a population of 80 inhabitants.

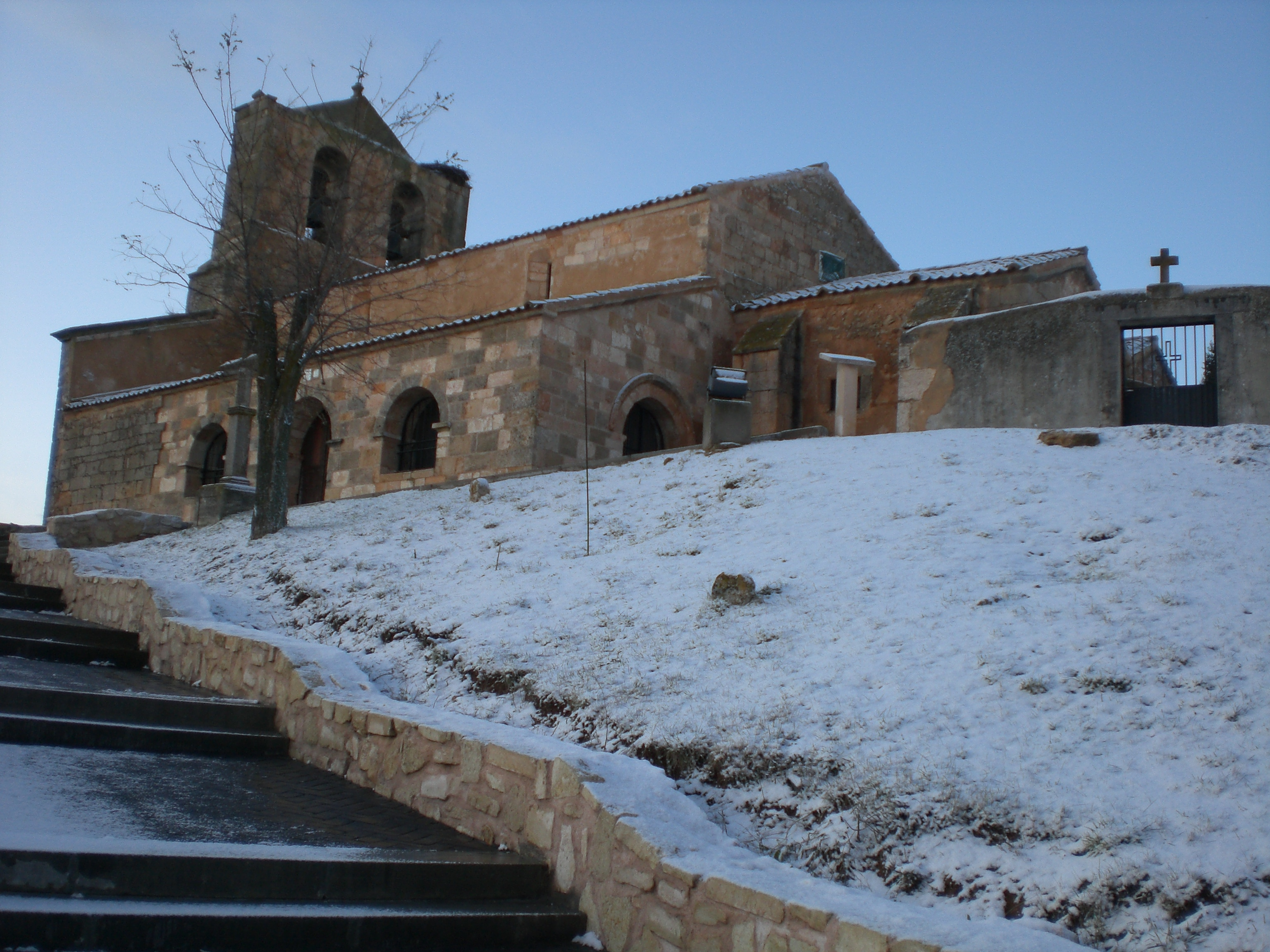
Church in the top of the town of Fresno de la Fuente
