= Arjonilla =

Arjonilla, Spain
- city
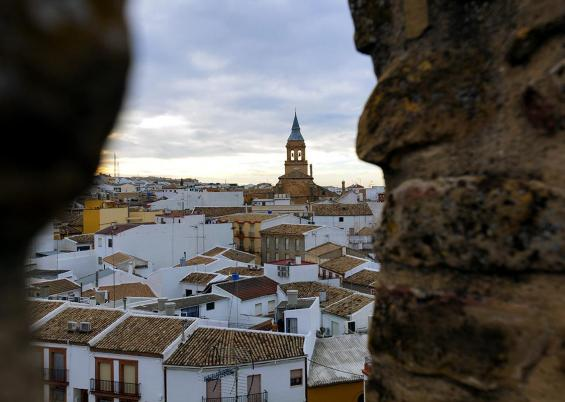

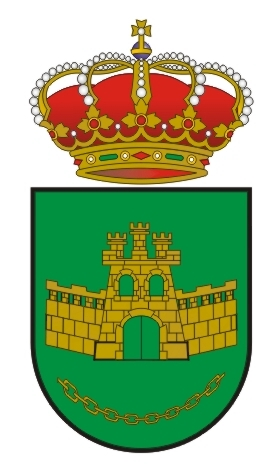
- Flag Coat of arms

- Location in the Province of Jaén Arjonilla (Andalusia) Arjonilla (Spain)
- Coordinates: 37°58′N 4°6′W
- Country: Spain
- Autonomous community: Andalusia
- Province: Jaén
- Municipality: Arjonilla

Area
  - Total: 42 km^{2} (16 sq mi)
- Elevation: 348 m (1,142 ft)

Population (2025-01-01)
  - Total: 3,520
  - Density: 84/km^{2} (220/sq mi)
- Time zone: UTC+1 (CET)
  - Summer (DST): UTC+2 (CEST)

Arjonilla is a town located in the province of Jaén, Spain. According to 2024 INE figures, the town had a population of 3535 inhabitants.

== See also ==
- List of municipalities in Jaén
