= Consolación (hamlet) =

Hamlet in Castile-La Mancha, Spain

Coordinates: 38°53′40.33″N 3°23′24.33″W

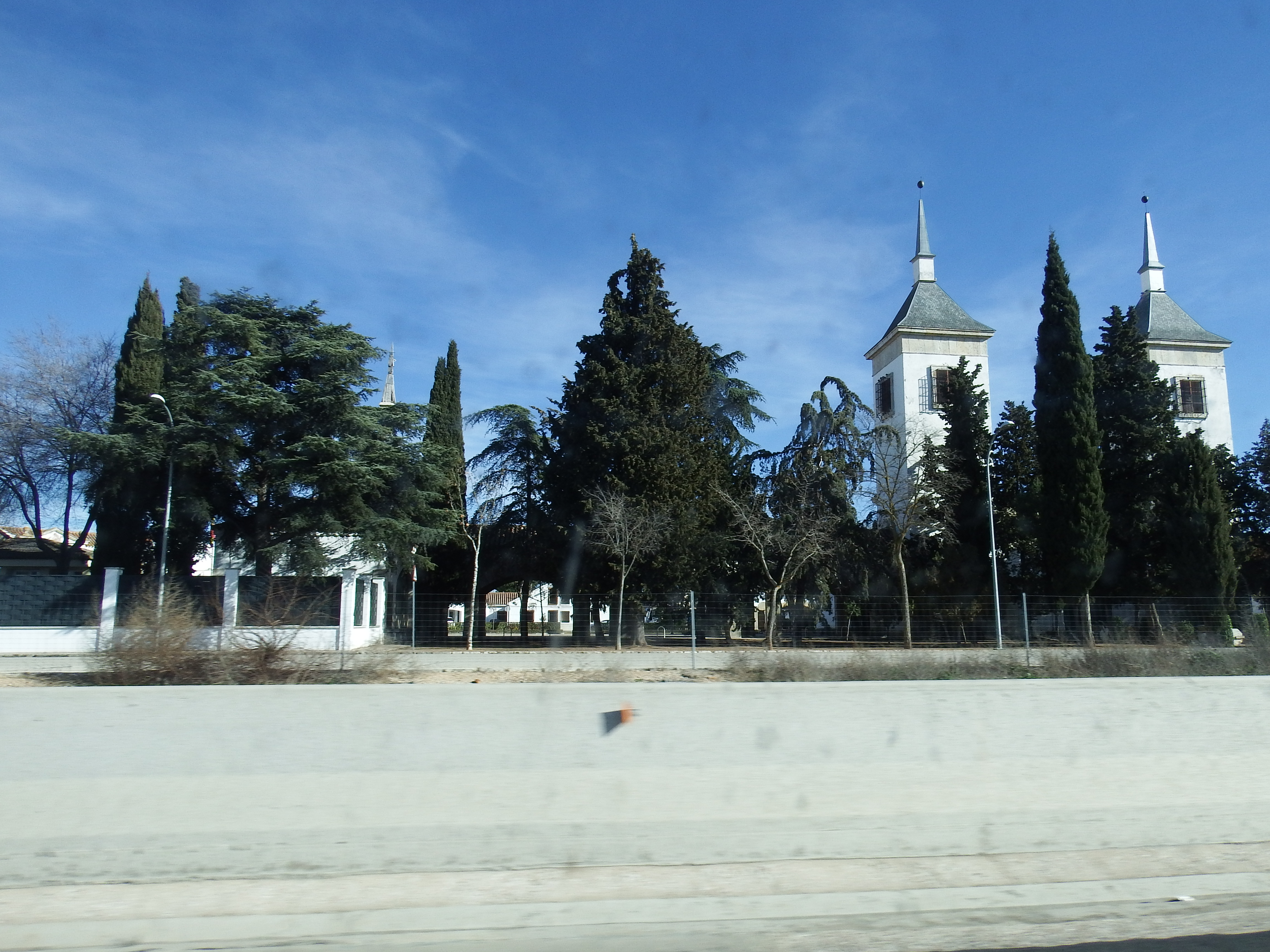
Consolación (Valdepeñas)

Consolación is a hamlet (pedanía) in the municipal term of Valdepeñas, Spain. It is located 11 km north of the town, at the intersection between Autovía A-4 (Autovia del Sur) and road CR-5214. The village was built by the Instituto Nacional de Colonización in 1949 and its streets are arranged in a geometrical pattern characteristic of those settlements. Its former name was Villanueva de Franco, after General Franco. According to the 2006 census of the INE, the village has a population of 223 inhabitants.
