= Ameyugo =

- Municipality and town
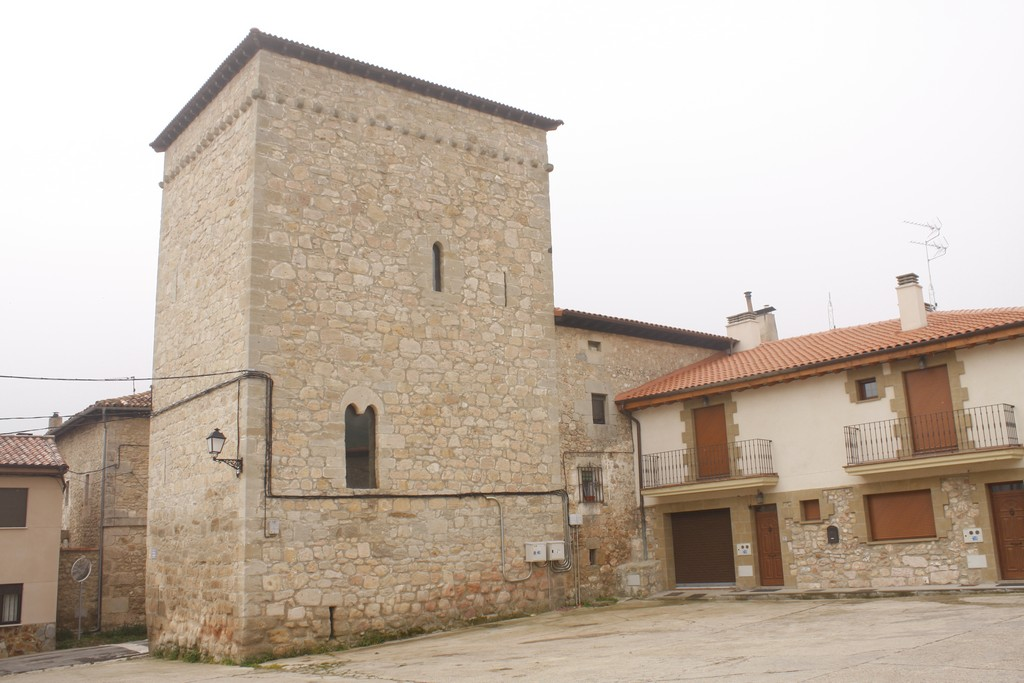
- Guevara tower (15th century)

- Flag Coat of arms

- Location within Castile and León Location within Spain
- Coordinates: 42°39′N 3°03′W
- Country: Spain
- Autonomous community: Castile and León
- Province: Burgos
- Comarca: Comarca del Ebro

Area
  - Total: 12.51 km^{2} (4.83 sq mi)
- Elevation: 555 m (1,821 ft)

Population (2004)
  - Total: 95
  - Density: 7.6/km^{2} (20/sq mi)
- Time zone: UTC+1 (CET)
  - Summer (DST): UTC+2 (CEST)
- Postal code: 09219
- Website: https://www.ameyugo.es/

Ameyugo is a municipality and town located in the province of Burgos, Castile and León, Spain. According to the 2004 census (INE), the municipality has a population of 95 inhabitants.
