= Valdorros =

Coordinates: 42°10′N 3°42′W

- municipality
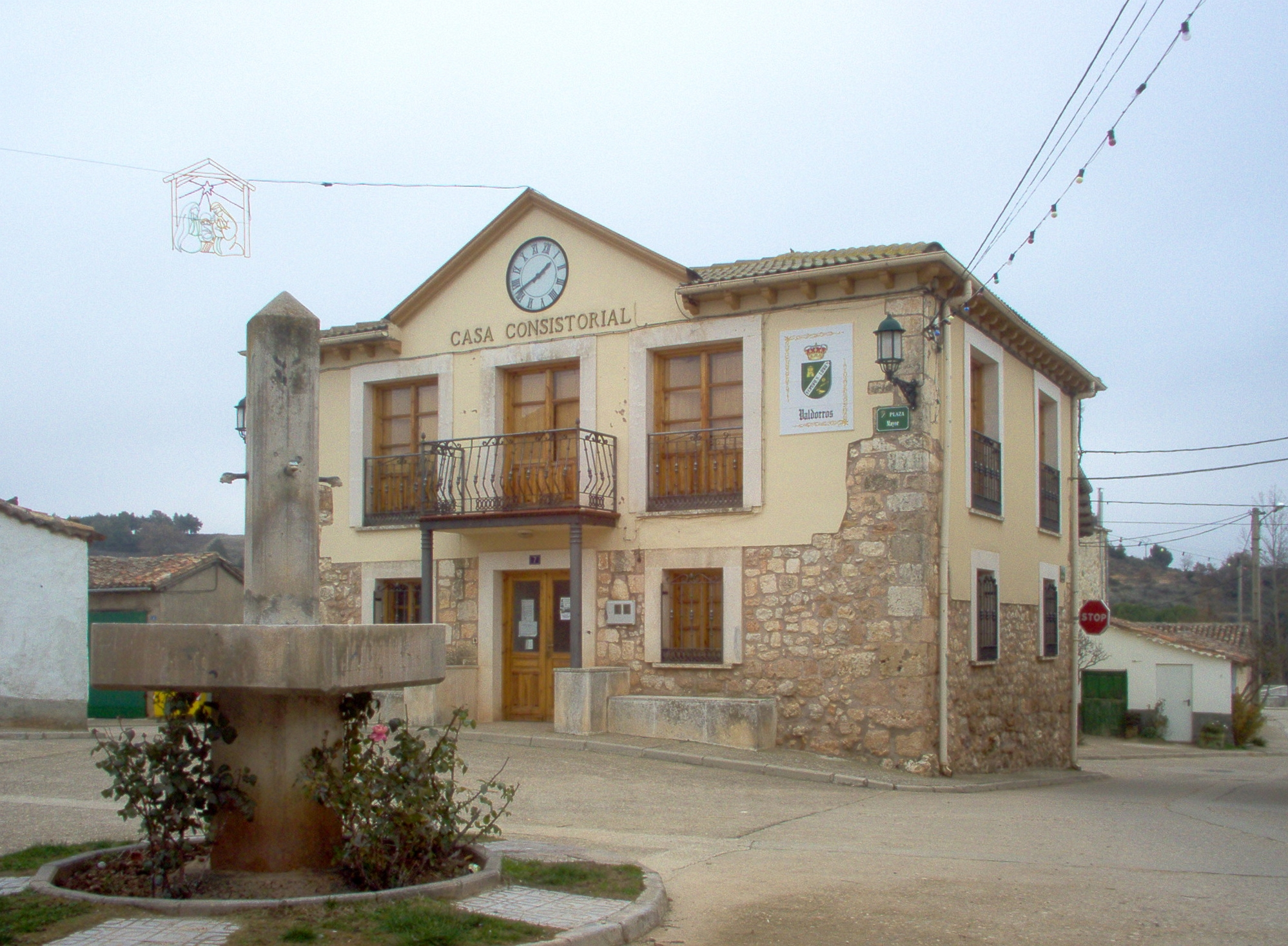
- Town Hall of Valdorros

- Coat of arms
- Interactive map of Valdorros
- Country: Spain
- Autonomous community: Castile and León
- Province: Burgos

Area
  - Total: 16 km^{2} (6.2 sq mi)

Population (2025-01-01)
  - Total: 377
  - Density: 24/km^{2} (61/sq mi)
- Time zone: UTC+1 (CET)
  - Summer (DST): UTC+2 (CEST)

Valdorros is a municipality located in the province of Burgos, Castile and León, Spain. According to the 2011 census (INE), the municipality has a population of 320 inhabitants.
