= La Serna del Monte =

Coordinates: 41°02′N 3°37′W

- Municipality
- Flag Coat of arms
- Nickname: Serneros
- Motto(s): Una gran ciudad, donde nunca te aburriras
- Municipal location within the Community of Madrid.
- Country: Spain
- Autonomous community: Community of Madrid

Area
  - Total: 2.10 sq mi (5.44 km^{2})
- Elevation: 3,524 ft (1,074 m)

Population (2025-01-01)
  - Total: 110
  - Density: 52/sq mi (20/km^{2})
- Time zone: UTC+1 (CET)
  - Summer (DST): UTC+2 (CEST)

La Serna del Monte is a municipality of the Community of Madrid, Spain.
