= El Berrueco =

Coordinates: 40.8881°N 3.56056°W

- Municipality
- Coat of arms

- Municipal location within the Community of Madrid.
- Country: Spain
- Autonomous community: Community of Madrid

Area
  - Total: 11.1 sq mi (28.8 km^{2})
- Elevation: 3,035 ft (925 m)

Population (2025-01-01)
  - Total: 795
- Time zone: UTC+1 (CET)
  - Summer (DST): UTC+2 (CEST)

El Berrueco (Spanish pronunciation: [el βeˈrweko]) is a municipality of the autonomous community of Madrid in central Spain. It is located in the north of the Community of Madrid.
