= Boceguillas =

- Municipality
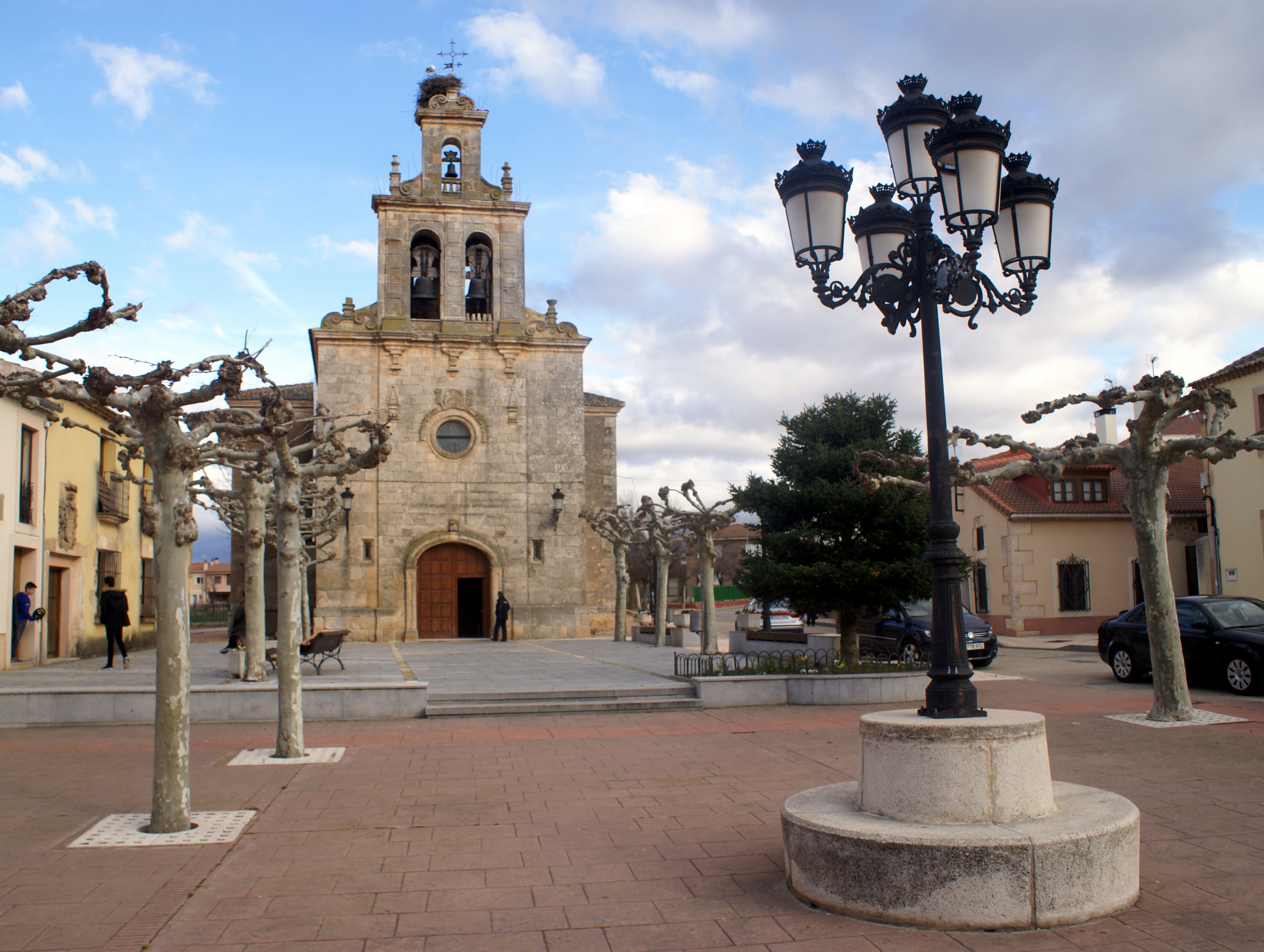
- Church in Boceguillas Town

- Flag Coat of arms

- Location in Spain. Boceguillas (Spain)
- Coordinates: 41°20′15″N 3°38′24″W
- Country: Spain
- Autonomous community: Castile and León
- Province: Segovia
- Municipality: Boceguillas

Area
  - Total: 41.54 km^{2} (16.04 sq mi)
- Elevation: 957 m (3,140 ft)

Population (2025-01-01)
  - Total: 746
  - Density: 18.0/km^{2} (46.5/sq mi)
- Time zone: UTC+1 (CET)
  - Summer (DST): UTC+2 (CEST)
- Website: Official website

Boceguillas is a municipality located in the province of Segovia, Castile and León, Spain. According to the 2004 census (INE), the municipality had a population of 649 inhabitants.
