= Sotillo =

- Municipality
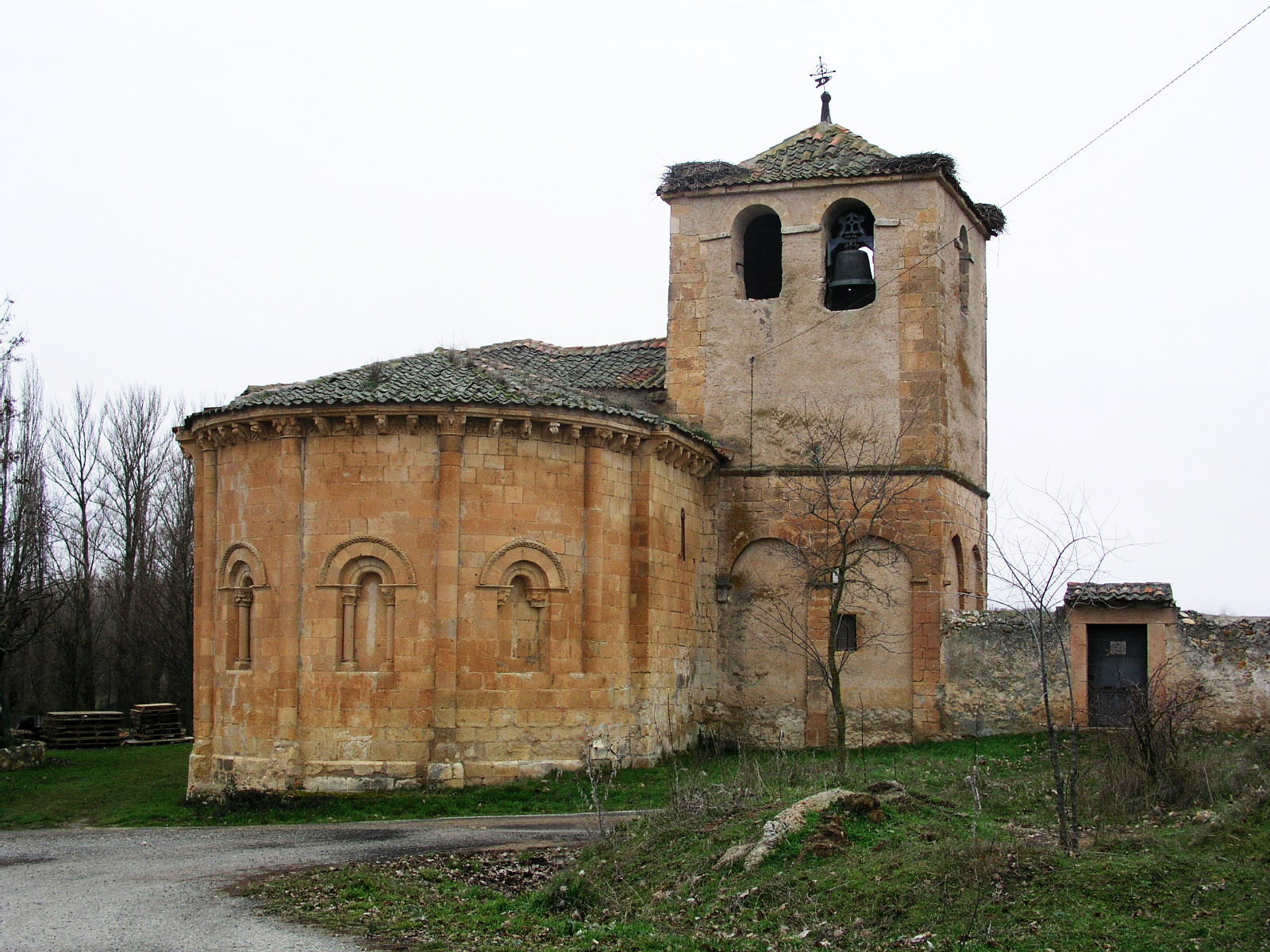

- Location in Spain. Sotillo (Spain)
- Coordinates: 41°15′30″N 3°38′12″W
- Country: Spain
- Autonomous community: Castile and León
- Province: Segovia
- Comarca: Villa y Tierra de Sepúlveda

Area
  - Total: 20.33 km^{2} (7.85 sq mi)
- Elevation: 968 m (3,176 ft)

Population (2025-01-01)
  - Total: 31
  - Density: 1.5/km^{2} (3.9/sq mi)
- Demonym: Castillejanos
- Time zone: UTC+1 (CET)
  - Summer (DST): UTC+2 (CEST)
- Postal code: 40593
- Website: Official website

Sotillo is a municipality located in the province of Segovia, which in turn is part of the autonomous community of Castilla y León, Spain.
