= Lopidana =

Hamlet in Álava, Spain

- Concejo
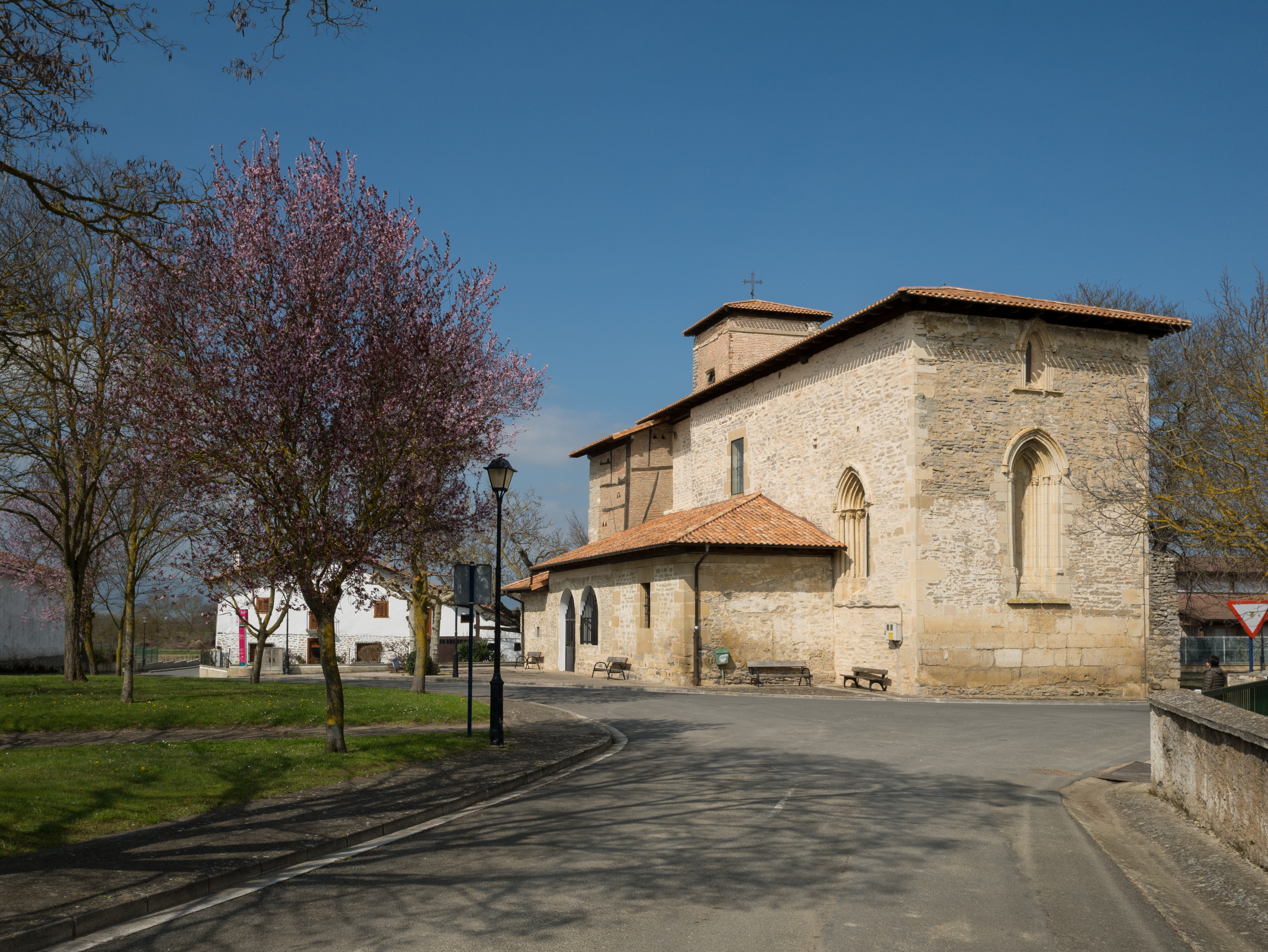
- The church of Lopidana

- Coat of arms

- Location within Álava Location within the Basque Country Location within Spain
- Coordinates: 42°52′23″N 2°42′43″W
- Country: Spain
- Autonomous community: Basque Country
- Province: Álava
- Comarca: Vitoria-Gasteiz
- Municipality: Vitoria-Gasteiz
- Elevation: 505 m (1,657 ft)

Population (2022)
  - Total: 26
- Postal code: 01196

Lopidana (Basque: Lopida) is a hamlet and concejo in the municipality of Vitoria-Gasteiz, in Álava province, Basque Country, Spain.
