= Aldeonte =

- Municipality
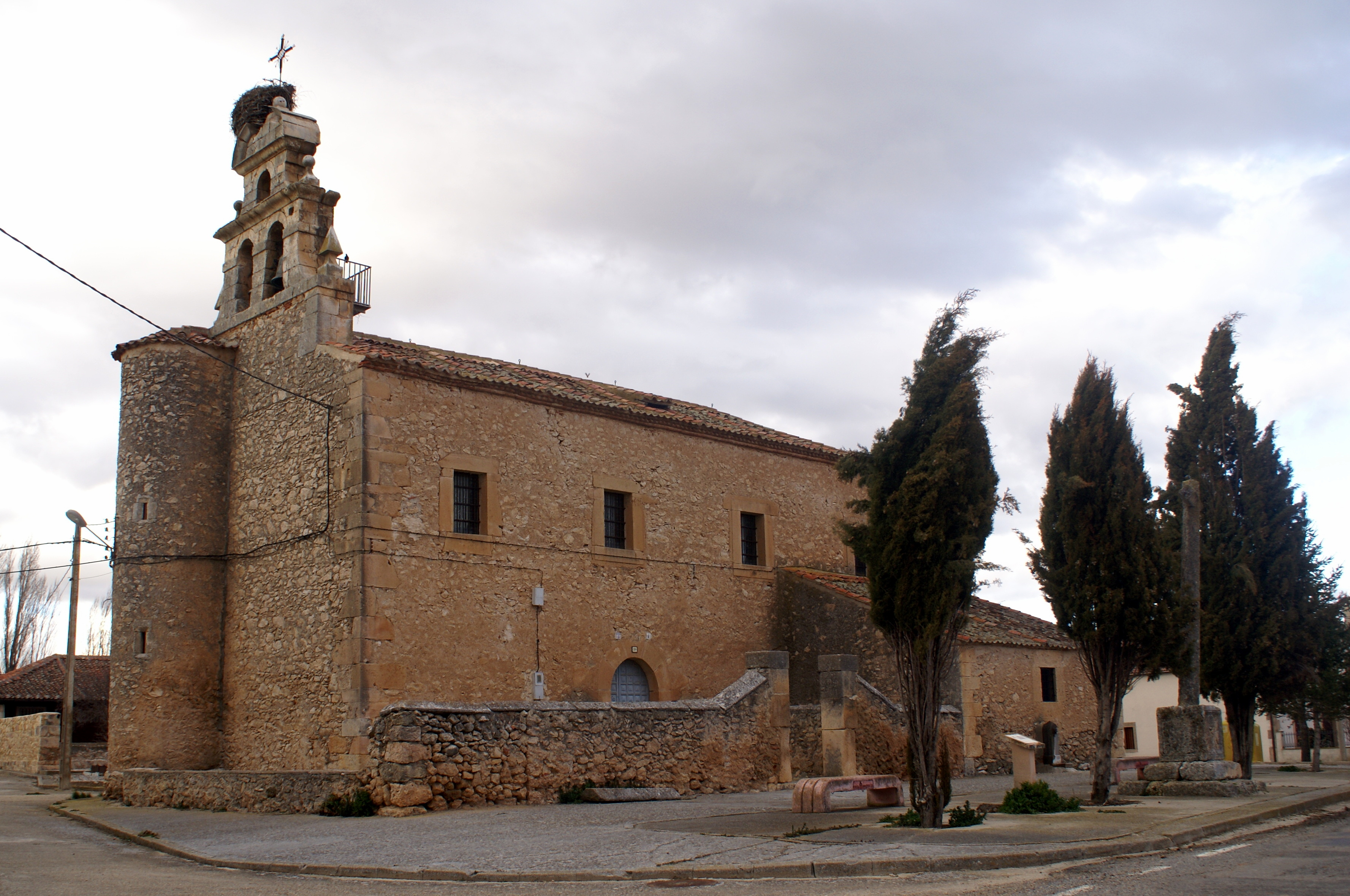

- Location in Spain. Aldeonte (Spain)
- Coordinates: 41°21′03″N 3°40′40″W
- Country: Spain
- Autonomous community: Castile and León
- Province: Segovia
- Municipality: Aldeonte

Area
  - Total: 20.56 km^{2} (7.94 sq mi)
- Elevation: 966 m (3,169 ft)

Population (2025-01-01)
  - Total: 55
  - Density: 2.7/km^{2} (6.9/sq mi)
- Time zone: UTC+1 (CET)
  - Summer (DST): UTC+2 (CEST)
- Website: Official website

Aldeonte is a municipality located in the province of Segovia, Castile and León, Spain. According to the 2004 census (INE), the municipality has a population of 94 inhabitants.
