= Grajera =

- Municipality
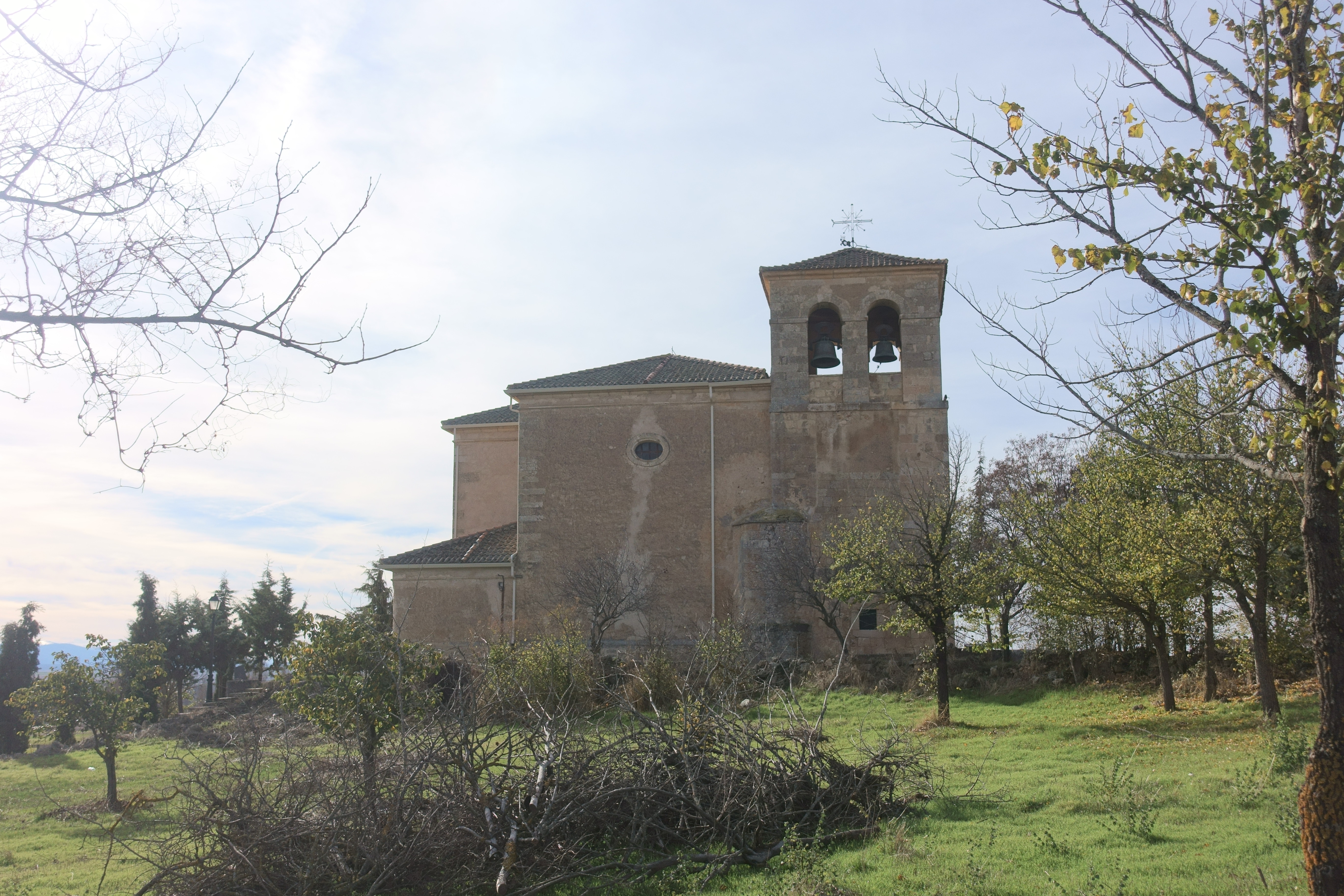
- Church of San Vitores, in Grajera (Segovia, Spain).

- Flag Coat of arms

- Location in Spain. Grajera (Spain)
- Coordinates: 41°22′22″N 3°36′46″W
- Country: Spain
- Autonomous community: Castile and León
- Province: Segovia
- Municipality: Grajera

Area
  - Total: 12 km^{2} (4.6 sq mi)

Population (2025-01-01)
  - Total: 252
  - Density: 21/km^{2} (54/sq mi)
- Time zone: UTC+1 (CET)
  - Summer (DST): UTC+2 (CEST)
- Website: Official website

Grajera is a municipality located in the province of Segovia, Castile and León, Spain. According to the 2004 census (INE), the municipality has a population of 103 inhabitants.

The ill-fated Spanish bullfighter Víctor Barrio was born in Grajera.
