= Gascones =

Coordinates: 41°01′N 3°38′W

- Municipality
- Flag Coat of arms

- Municipal location within the Community of Madrid.
- Country: Spain
- Autonomous community: Community of Madrid

Area
  - Total: 7.74 sq mi (20.04 km^{2})
- Elevation: 3,428 ft (1,045 m)

Population (2025-01-01)
  - Total: 252
  - Density: 32.6/sq mi (12.6/km^{2})
- Time zone: UTC+1 (CET)
  - Summer (DST): UTC+2 (CEST)

Gascones (Spanish: [ɡasˈkones]) is a municipality of the autonomous community of Madrid in central Spain. It belongs to the comarca of Sierra Norte.

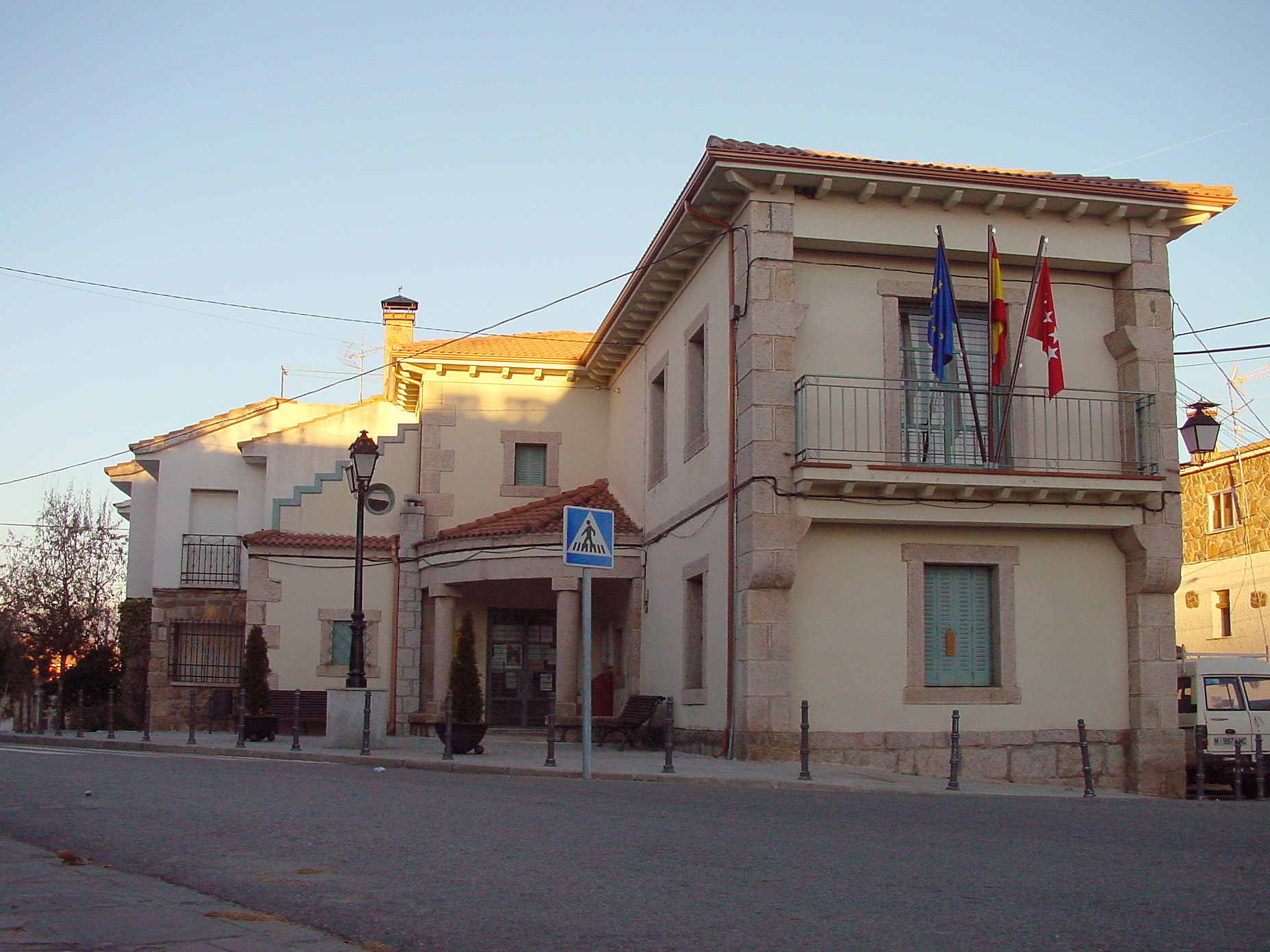
City Hall
