= Pardilla =

Coordinates: 41°33′N 3°42′W

- Municipality and town
- Coat of arms
- Interactive map of Pardilla
- Country: Spain
- Autonomous community: Castile and León
- Province: Burgos
- Comarca: Ribera del Duero

Area
  - Total: 15 km^{2} (5.8 sq mi)
- Elevation: 902 m (2,959 ft)

Population (2025-01-01)
  - Total: 109
  - Density: 7.3/km^{2} (19/sq mi)
- Time zone: UTC+1 (CET)
  - Summer (DST): UTC+2 (CEST)
- Postal code: 09462
- Website: http://www.pardilla.es/

Pardilla is a municipality and town located in the province of Burgos, Castile and León, Spain. According to the 2004 census (INE), the municipality has a population of 126 inhabitants.

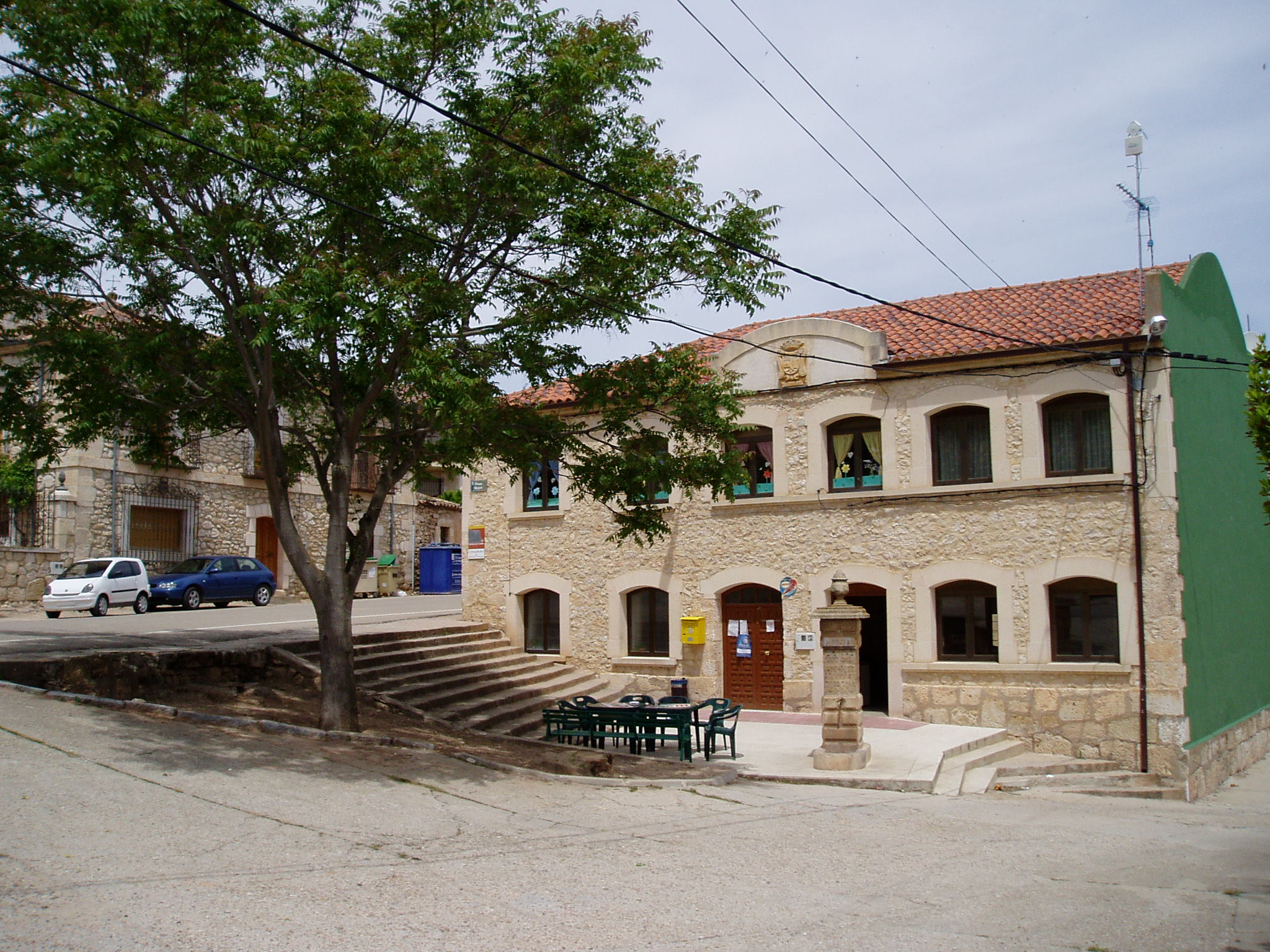
Pardilla Town Hall
