= Santo Tomé del Puerto =

- Municipality
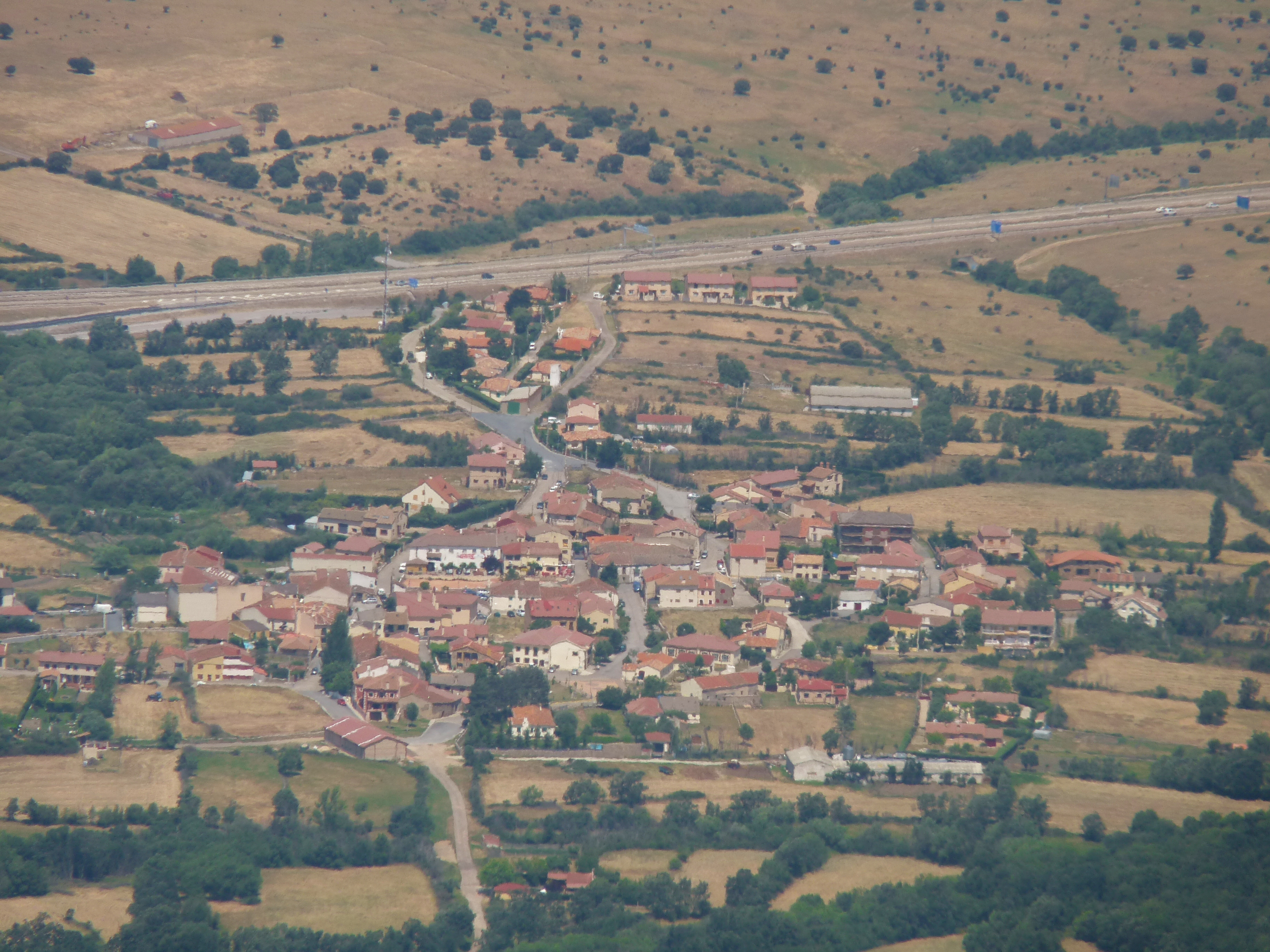
- Aerial view of Santo Tomé del Puerto

- Flag Coat of arms

- Location in Spain. Santo Tomé del Puerto (Spain)
- Coordinates: 41°11′39″N 3°34′38″W
- Country: Spain
- Autonomous community: Castile and León
- Province: Segovia
- Municipality: Santo Tomé del Puerto

Area
  - Total: 56.87 km^{2} (21.96 sq mi)
- Elevation: 1,072 m (3,517 ft)

Population (2025-01-01)
  - Total: 230
  - Density: 4.0/km^{2} (10/sq mi)
- Time zone: UTC+1 (CET)
  - Summer (DST): UTC+2 (CEST)
- Website: Official website

Santo Tomé del Puerto is a municipality located in the province of Segovia, Castile and León, Spain. According to the 2004 census (INE), the municipality had a population of 349 inhabitants.
