= Villavieja del Lozoya =

Coordinates: 41°00′N 3°40′W

- Municipality
- Flag Coat of arms

- Municipal location within the Community of Madrid.
- Country: Spain
- Autonomous community: Community of Madrid

Area
  - Total: 9.1 sq mi (23.6 km^{2})
- Elevation: 3,497 ft (1,066 m)

Population (2025-01-01)
  - Total: 332
  - Density: 36.4/sq mi (14.1/km^{2})
- Time zone: UTC+1 (CET)
  - Summer (DST): UTC+2 (CEST)

Villavieja del Lozoya is a municipality of the Community of Madrid, Spain.
