= Barbolla =

- Municipality
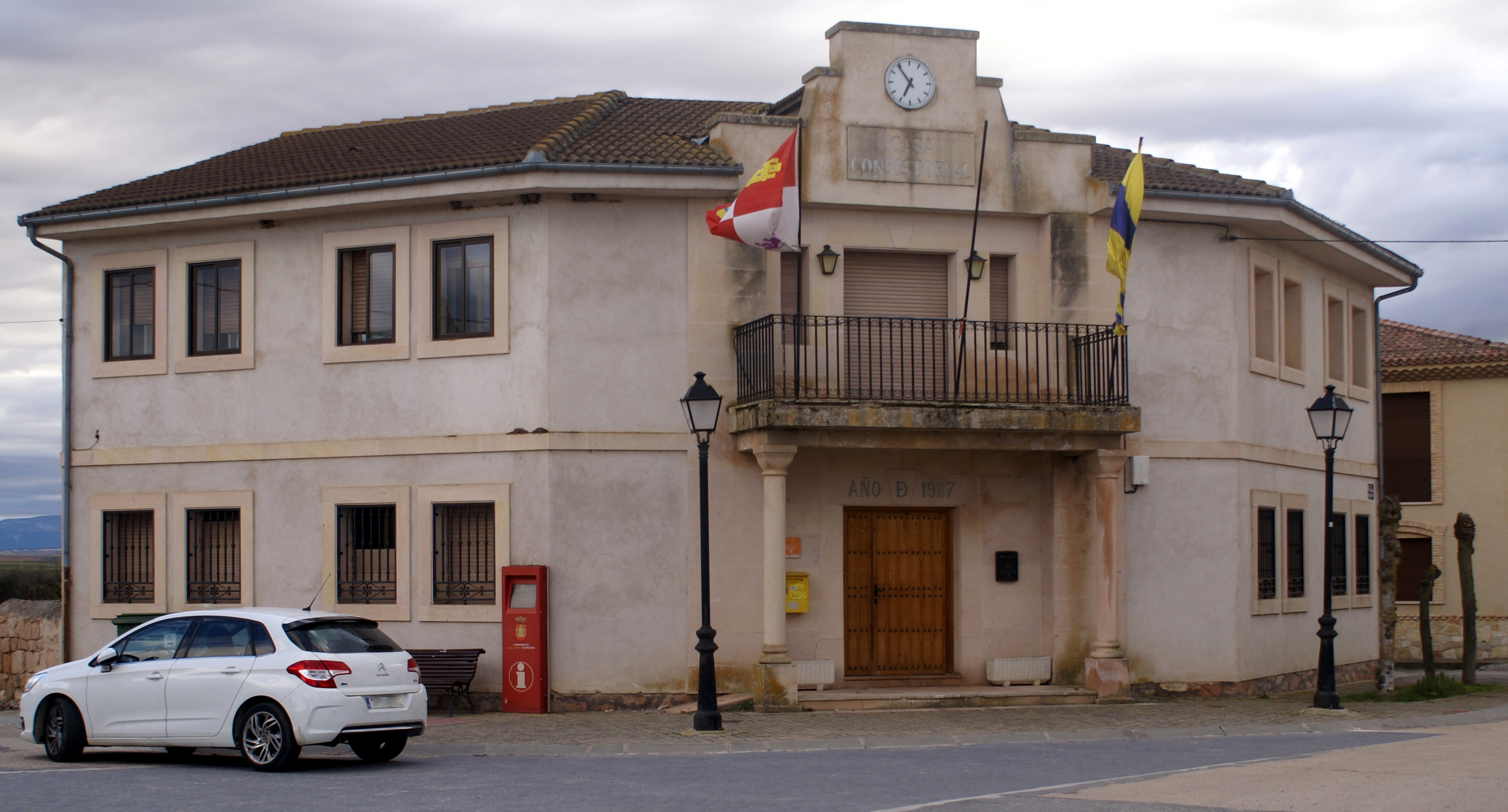
- Town hall of Barbolla, Segovia, Spain.

- Flag Coat of arms

- Location in Spain. Barbolla (Spain)
- Coordinates: 41°19′33″N 3°40′21″W
- Country: Spain
- Autonomous community: Castile and León
- Province: Segovia
- Municipality: Barbolla

Area
  - Total: 26.13 km^{2} (10.09 sq mi)
- Elevation: 942 m (3,091 ft)

Population (2025-01-01)
  - Total: 142
  - Density: 5.43/km^{2} (14.1/sq mi)
- Time zone: UTC+1 (CET)
  - Summer (DST): UTC+2 (CEST)
- Website: Official website

Barbolla is a municipality located in the province of Segovia, Castile and León, Spain. According to the 2004 census (INE), the municipality had a population of 226 inhabitants.
