= Bahabón de Esgueva =

- Municipality and town
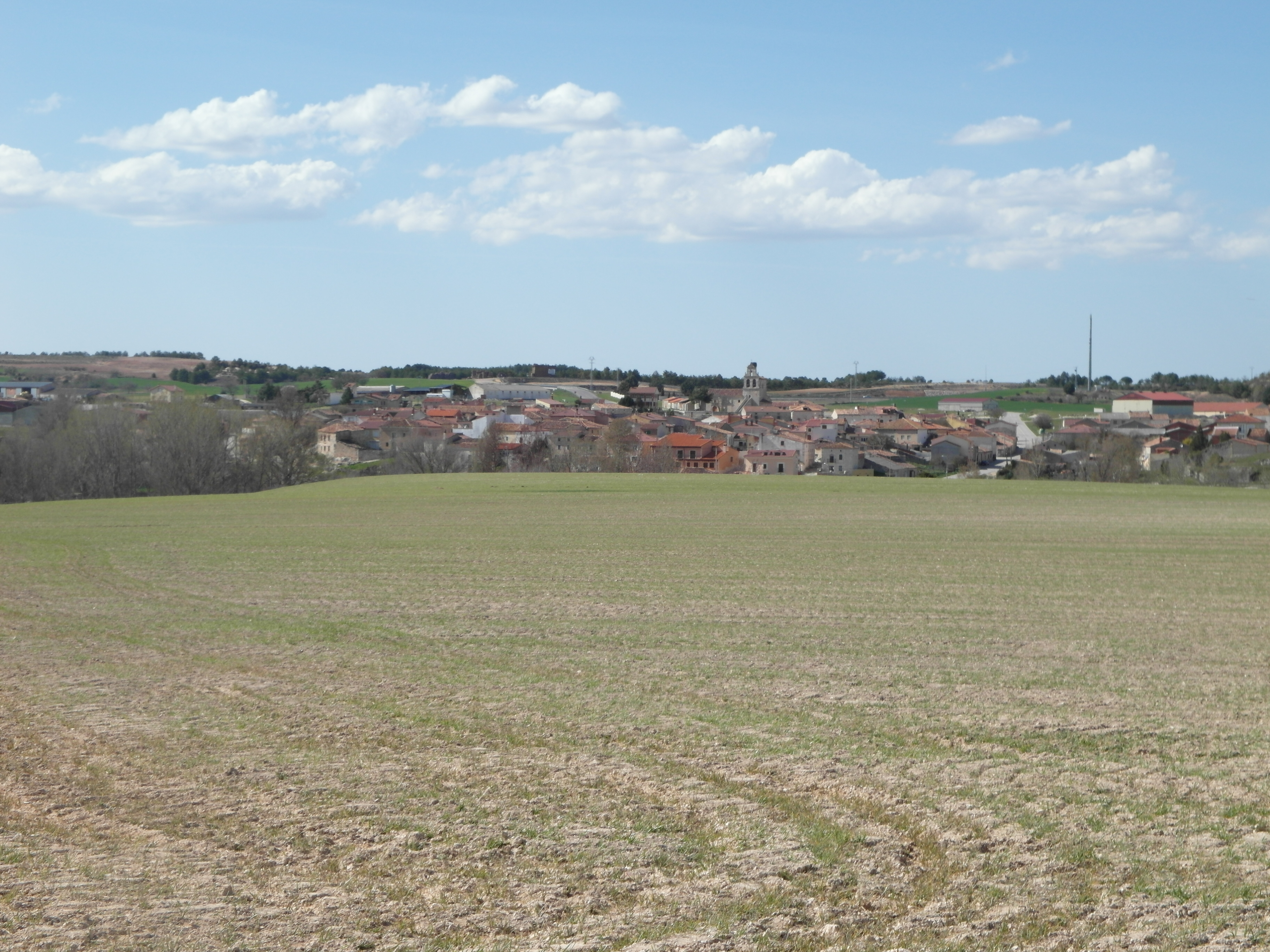
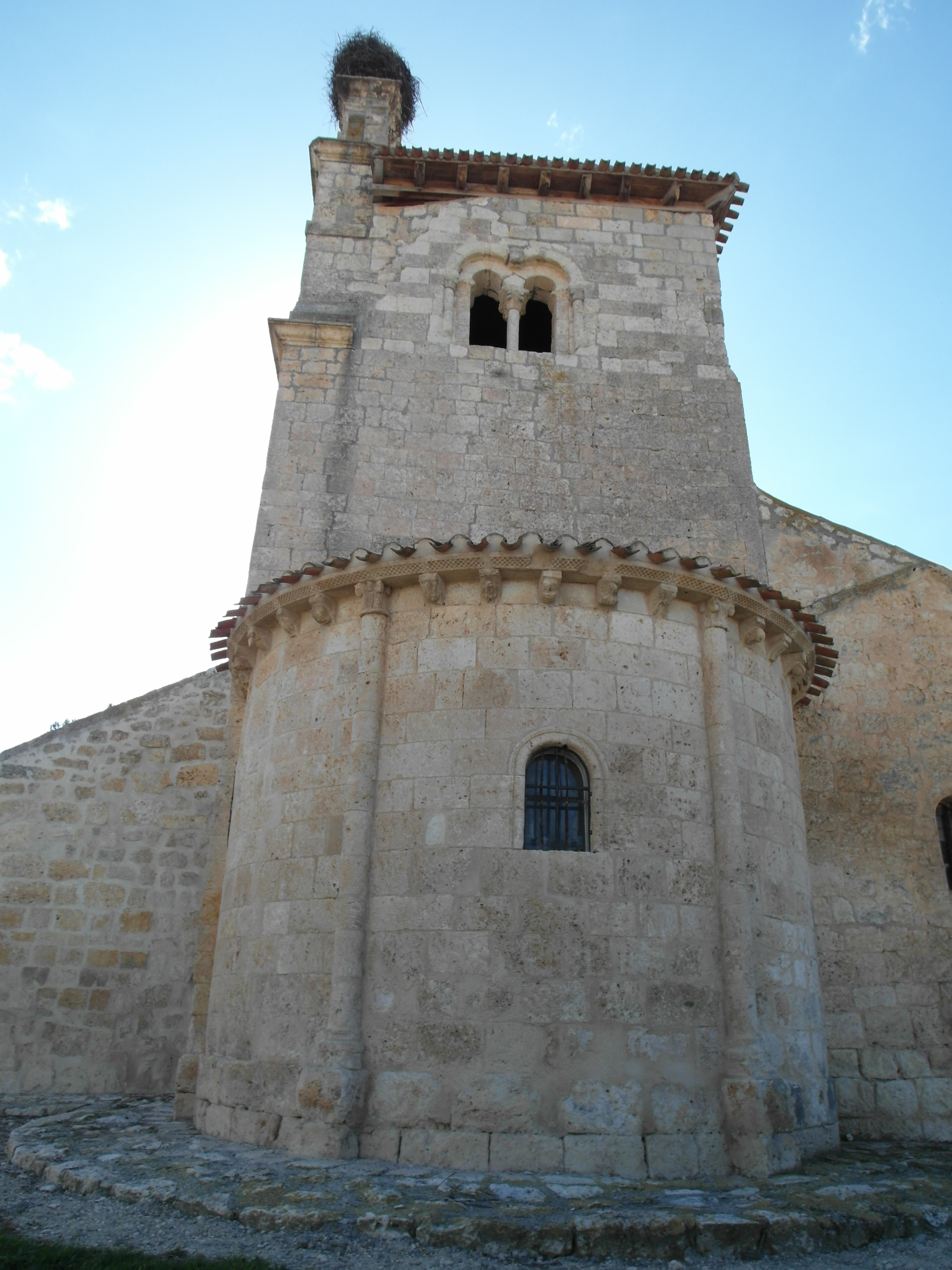
- View of Bahabón de Esgueva, 2013

- Coat of arms

- Location within Castile and León Location within Spain
- Country: Spain
- Autonomous community: Castile and León
- Province: Burgos
- Comarca: Arlanza

Area
  - Total: 21.39 km^{2} (8.26 sq mi)
- Elevation: 915 m (3,002 ft)

Population (2025-01-01)
  - Total: 80
  - Density: 3.7/km^{2} (9.7/sq mi)
- Time zone: UTC+1 (CET)
  - Summer (DST): UTC+2 (CEST)
- Postal code: 09350
- Website: www.bahabondeesgueva.es

Bahabón de Esgueva is a municipality and town located in the province of Burgos, Castile and León, Spain. According to the 2004 census (INE), the municipality has a population of 124 inhabitants.
