= Revillarruz =

Coordinates: 42°14′N 3°39′W

- Municipality and town
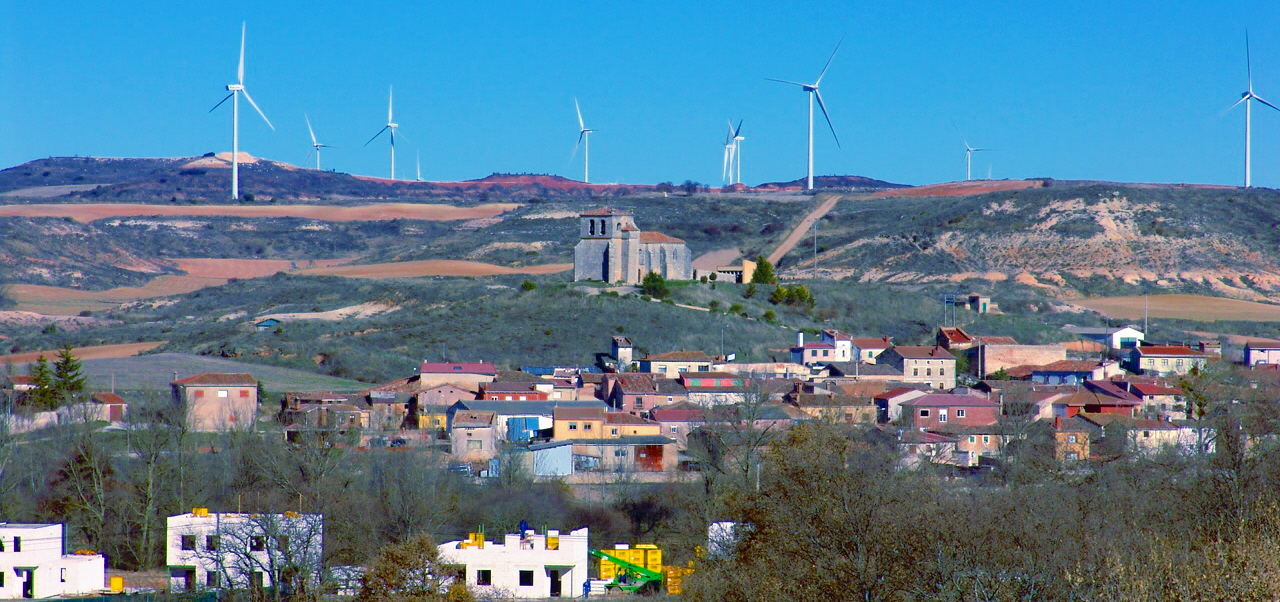
- View of Revillarruz, 2009

- Flag Coat of arms
- Interactive map of Revillarruz
- Country: Spain
- Autonomous community: Castile and León
- Province: Burgos
- Comarca: Alfoz de Burgos

Area
  - Total: 16.98 km^{2} (6.56 sq mi)
- Elevation: 908 m (2,979 ft)

Population (2025-01-01)
  - Total: 621
  - Density: 36.6/km^{2} (94.7/sq mi)
- Time zone: UTC+1 (CET)
  - Summer (DST): UTC+2 (CEST)
- Postal code: 09620
- Website: http://www.revillarruz.es/

Revillarruz is a municipality and town located in the province of Burgos, Castile and León, Spain. According to the 2004 census (INE), the municipality has a population of 178 inhabitants.
