= Cabañes de Esgueva =

- Municipality and town
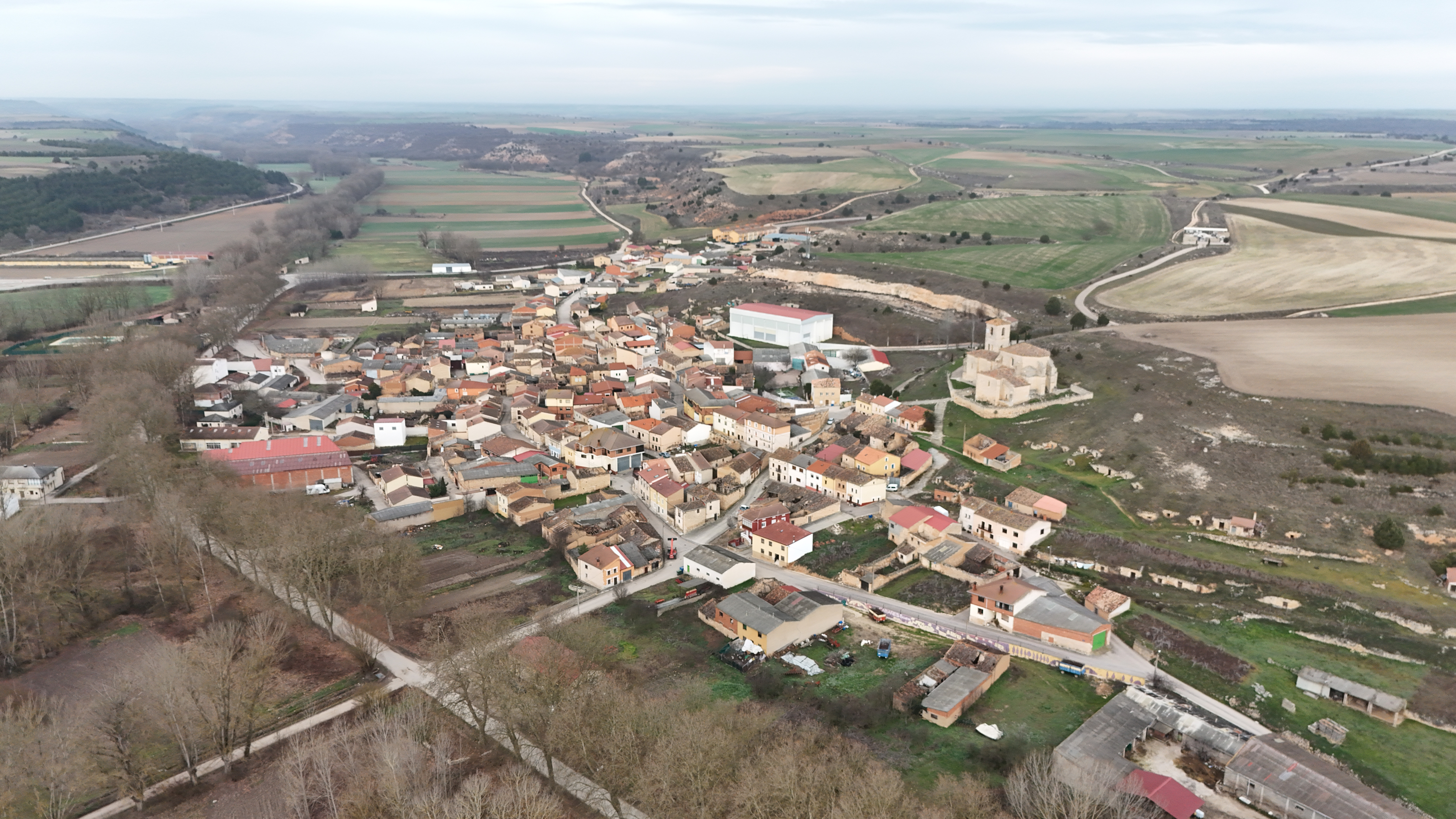
- Cabañes de Esgueva view, 2025

- Coat of arms
- Interactive map of Cabañes de Esgueva
- Country: Spain
- Autonomous community: Castile and León
- Province: Burgos
- Comarca: Arlanza

Area
  - Total: 27 km^{2} (10 sq mi)
- Elevation: 905 m (2,969 ft)

Population (2025-01-01)
  - Total: 145
  - Density: 5.4/km^{2} (14/sq mi)
- Time zone: UTC+1 (CET)
  - Summer (DST): UTC+2 (CEST)
- Postal code: 09350
- Website: http://www.cabañesdeesgueva.es/

Cabañes de Esgueva is a municipality located in the province of Burgos, Castile and León, Spain. According to the 2004 census (INE), the municipality has a population of 243 inhabitants.
