= Santibáñez de Esgueva =

Coordinates: 41.85°N 3.75°W

- Municipality and town
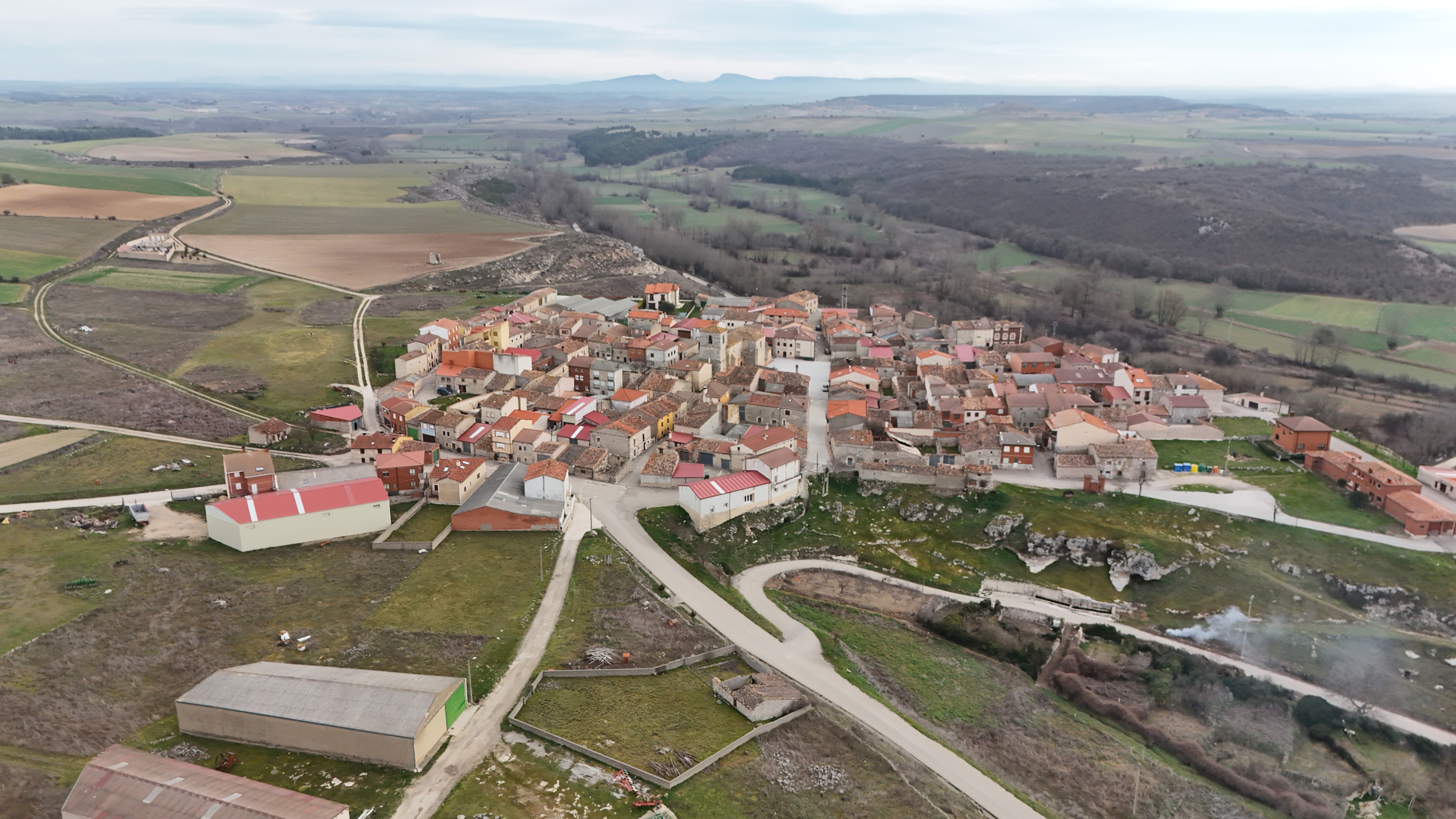
- Santibáñez de Esgueva aerial view

- Coat of arms
- Interactive map of Santibáñez de Esgueva
- Country: Spain
- Autonomous community: Castile and León
- Province: Burgos
- Comarca: Ribera del Duero

Area
  - Total: 22 km^{2} (8.5 sq mi)

Population (2025-01-01)
  - Total: 72
  - Density: 3.3/km^{2} (8.5/sq mi)
- Time zone: UTC+1 (CET)
  - Summer (DST): UTC+2 (CEST)
- Postal code: 09350
- Website: https://www.santibañezdeesgueva.es/

Santibáñez de Esgueva is a municipality and town in the Province of Burgos, Castile and León, Spain. According to the 2004 census ([[Instituto Nacional de Estadística (Spain)|INE]]), the municipality has a population of 148 inhabitants.
