= Horcajo de la Sierra =

- Municipality
- Flag Coat of arms
- Interactive map of Horcajo de la Sierra
- Coordinates: 41°4′5″N 3°35′9″W
- Country: Spain
- Autonomous community: Community of Madrid
- Province: Madrid
- Comarca: Sierra Norte de Madrid

Government
  - Mayor: Raúl Andrés Martín

Area
  - Total: 21.2 km^{2} (8.2 sq mi)
- Elevation: 1,068 m (3,504 ft)

Population (2025-01-01)
  - Total: 219
  - Density: 10.3/km^{2} (26.8/sq mi)
- Time zone: UTC+1 (CET)
  - Summer (DST): UTC+2 (CEST)
- Postal code: 28755

Horcajo de la Sierra (Spanish: [oɾˈkaxo ðe la ˈsjera]) is a municipality of the Community of Madrid, Spain.

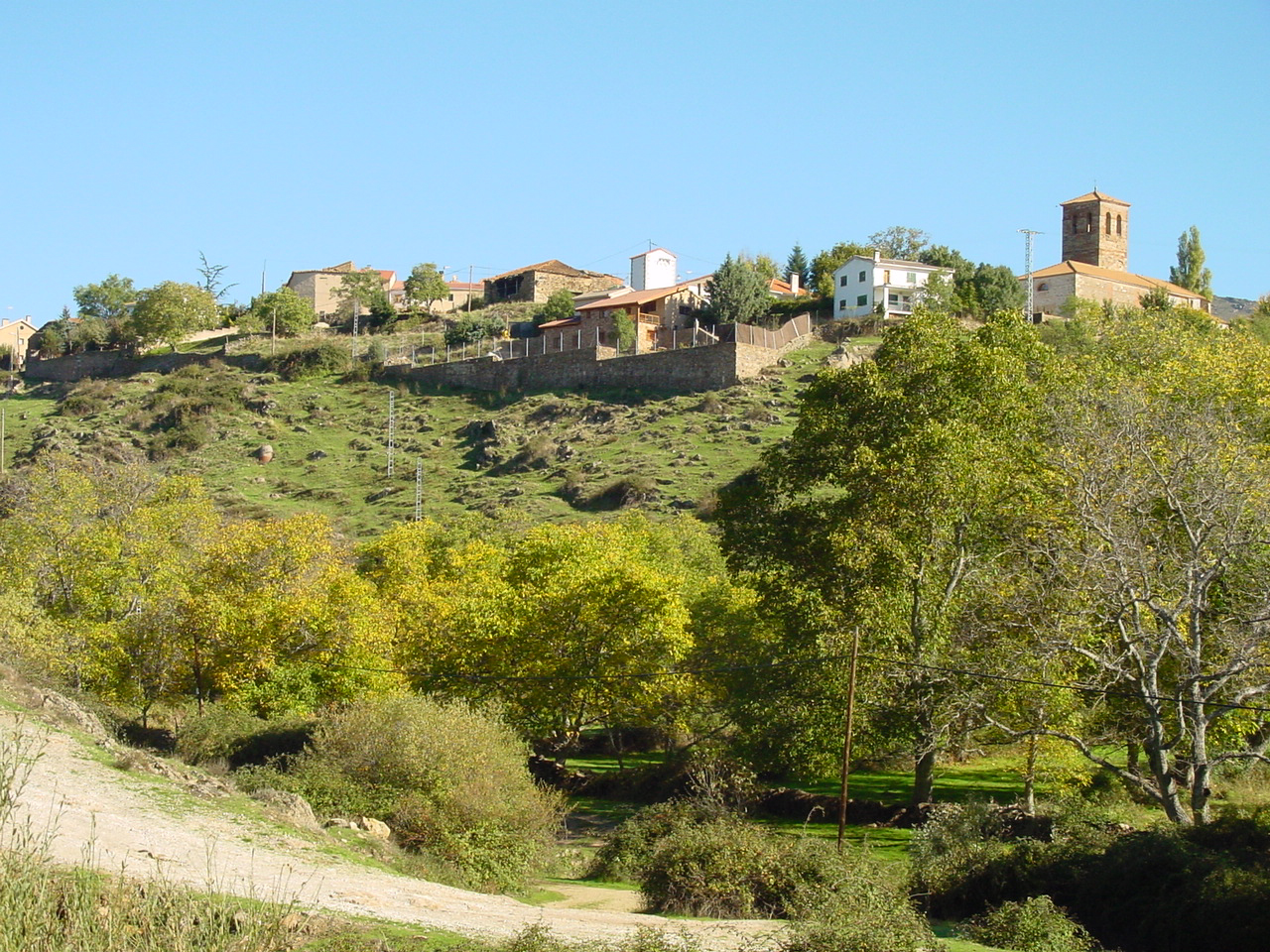
View of Horcajo de la Sierra
