= Horcajuelo de la Sierra =

Coordinates: 41°04′N 3°32′W

- Municipality
- Flag Coat of arms

- Municipal location within the Community of Madrid.
- Country: Spain
- Autonomous community: Community of Madrid

Population (2025-01-01)
  - Total: 104
- Time zone: UTC+1 (CET)
  - Summer (DST): UTC+2 (CEST)

Horcajuelo de la Sierra (Spanish pronunciation: [oɾkaˈxwelo ðe la ˈsjera]) is a municipality of the Community of Madrid, Spain.
