= Villaverde de Montejo =

- Municipality
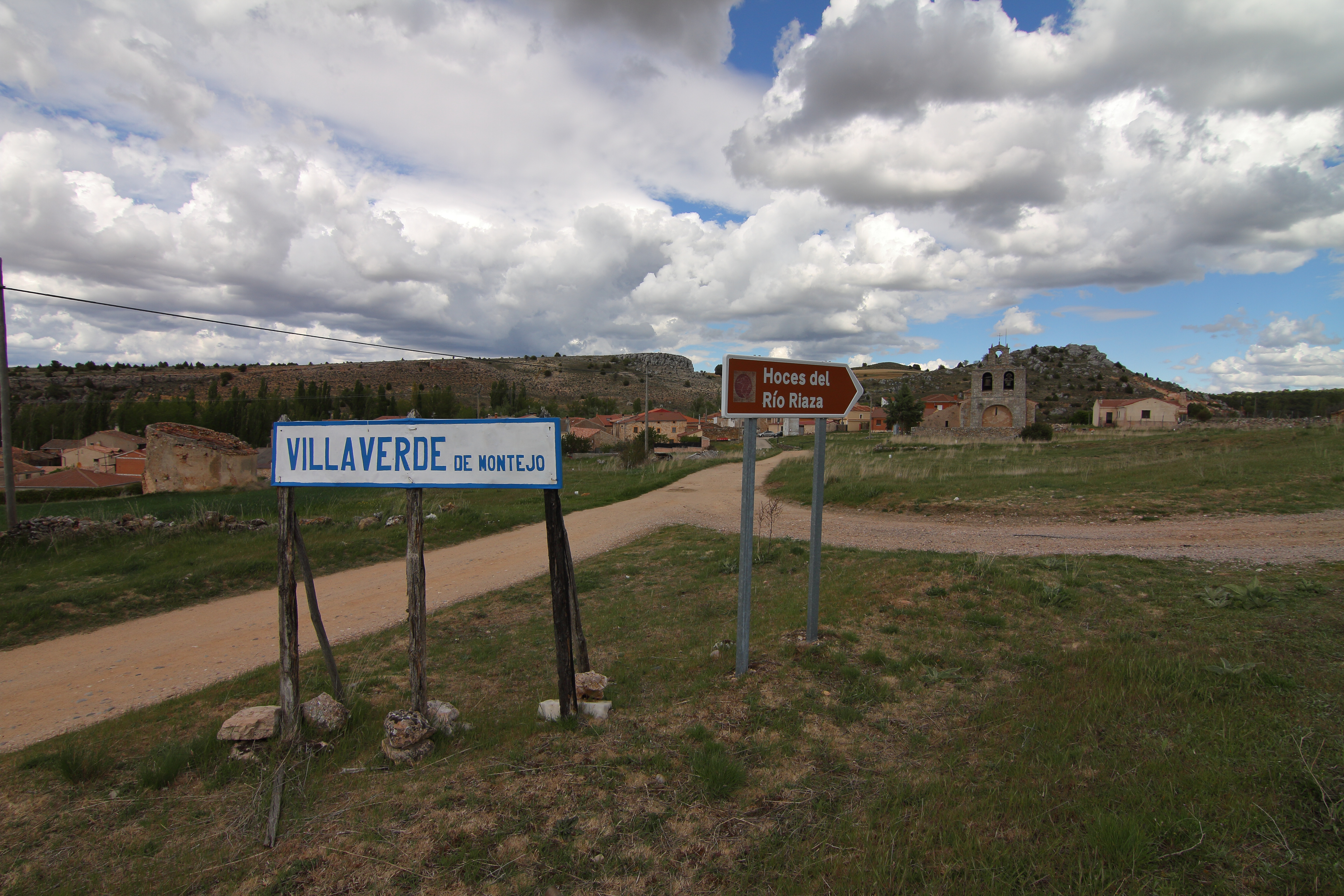
- Street of Villaverde de Montejo

- Location in Spain. Villaverde de Montejo (Spain)
- Coordinates: 41°31′21″N 3°39′19″W
- Country: Spain
- Autonomous community: Castile and León
- Province: Segovia
- Municipality: Villaverde de Montejo

Area
  - Total: 24 km^{2} (9.3 sq mi)

Population (2025-01-01)
  - Total: 22
  - Density: 0.92/km^{2} (2.4/sq mi)
- Time zone: UTC+1 (CET)
  - Summer (DST): UTC+2 (CEST)
- Website: Official website

Villaverde de Montejo is a municipality located in the province of Segovia, Castile and León, Spain. According to the 2004 census (INE), the municipality has a population of 58 inhabitants.
