= Autopista AP-36 =

Motorway from Ocaña to La Roda (Spain)

Autopista AP-36
- Autopista Ocaña - La Roda
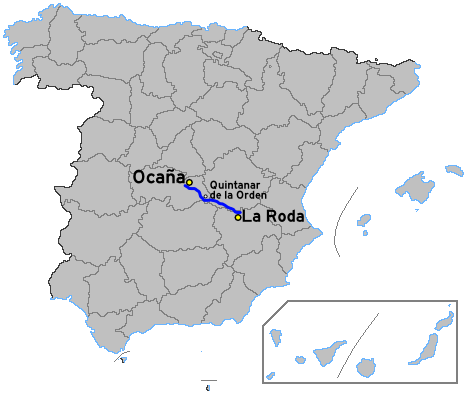

Route information
- Length: 147 km (91 mi)

Major junctions
- From: Ocaña
- To: La Roda

Location
- Country: Spain

Highway system
- Highways in Spain; Autopistas and autovías; National Roads

The Autopista AP-36 (also known as Autopista Ocaña - La Roda) is an autopista in the community of Castile-La Mancha, Spain. It starts at the junction of the Autovía A-4 and the Autopista R-4 near Ocaña in the province of Toledo, and runs, parallel to the N-301 road, past the towns of Quintanar de la Orden and San Clemente (where it connects with the Autovía A-43), before ending at the Autovía A-31 near La Roda in the province of Albacete. Built to relieve congestion on the Autovía A-3 between Madrid and the A-31, it opened in July 2006.
