= Marmolejo, Spain =

- city
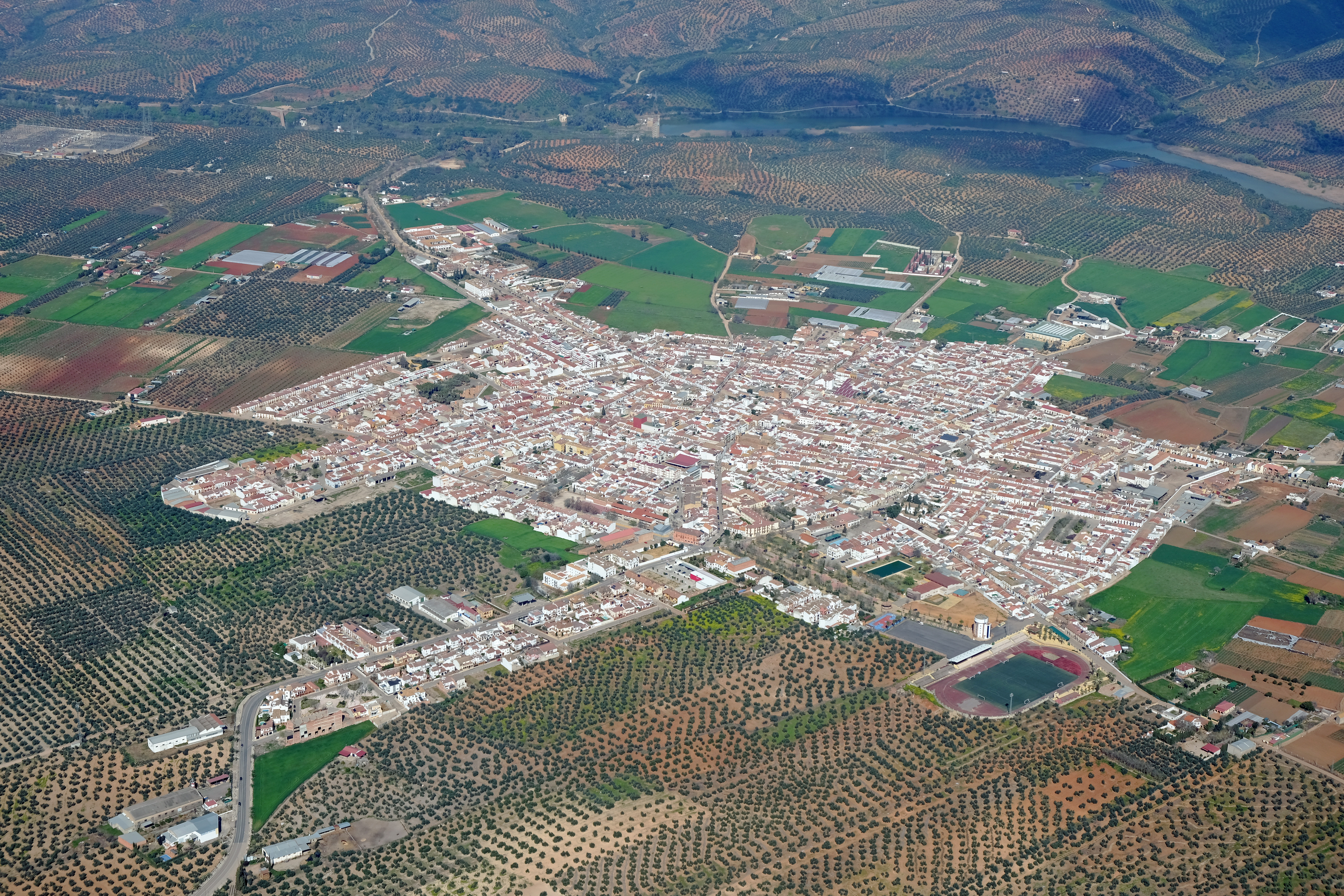
- Aerial view of Marmolejo

- Flag Coat of arms

- Location in the Province of Jaén Marmolejo, Spain (Andalusia) Marmolejo, Spain (Spain)
- Coordinates: 38°03′N 4°10′W
- Country: Spain
- Autonomous community: Andalusia
- Province: Jaén
- Municipality: Marmolejo

Area
  - Total: 178 km^{2} (69 sq mi)
- Elevation: 248 m (814 ft)

Population (2025-01-01)
  - Total: 6,412
  - Density: 36.0/km^{2} (93.3/sq mi)
- Time zone: UTC+1 (CET)
  - Summer (DST): UTC+2 (CEST)

Marmolejo is a city located in the province of Jaén, Spain. According to the 2005 census (INE), the city has a population of 7605 inhabitants.

== See also ==
- List of municipalities in Jaén
