= Piñuécar-Gandullas =

- Municipality
- Flag Coat of arms

- Municipal location within the Community of Madrid.
- Coordinates: 41.0125°N 3.6019°W
- Country: Spain
- Autonomous community: Community of Madrid

Population (2025-01-01)
  - Total: 183
- Time zone: UTC+1 (CET)
  - Summer (DST): UTC+2 (CEST)

Piñuécar-Gandullas (Spanish pronunciation: [piˈɲwekaɾ ɣanˈduʎas]) is a municipality of the Community of Madrid, Spain.
