= List of bridges in Spain =

This list of bridges in Spain lists bridges of particular historical, scenic, architectural or engineering interest. Road and railway bridges, viaducts, aqueducts and footbridges are included.

== Bridges of historical importance ==
| | Name | Distinction | Length | Type | Carries Crosses | Opened | Location | Autonomous communitie | Ref. |
|---|---|---|---|---|---|---|---|---|---|
| 1 | Roman bridge of Córdoba | Via Augusta; Bien de Interés Cultural | 247 m (810 ft) | Masonry; 16 arches | Footbridge; Guadalquivir | 100 BC | Córdoba; 37°52′36.1″N 4°46′40.7″W | Andalusia | |
| 2 | Aqueduct of Segovia | World Heritage Site (1985); Bien de Interés Cultural | 823 m (2,700 ft) | Masonry; 2 levels (44 and 119 arches), dry stone | Aqueduct; Plaza del Azoguejo | 80 | Segovia; 40°56′52.5″N 4°07′04.1″W | Castile and León | |
| 3 | Acueducto de los Milagros | Augusta Emerita; World Heritage Site (1993); Bien de Interés Cultural | 827 m (2,713 ft) | Masonry; 3 levels (38 arches remaining) | Aqueduct; Río Albarregas | 1st century | Mérida; 38°55′27.0″N 6°20′52.2″W | Extremadura | |
| 4 | Aqueduct of Peña Cortada | | 36 m (118 ft) | Masonry; 3 arches | Aqueduct; Rambla de Alcotas | 1st century | Chelva; 39°44′58.0″N 0°58′05.0″W | Valencian Community | |
| 5 | Roman bridge of Salamanca | Old City of Salamanca; World Heritage Site (1988); Bien de Interés Cultural | 356 m (1,168 ft) | Masonry; 26 arches | Footbridge; Tormes | | Salamanca; 40°57′28.2″N 5°40′12.5″W | Castile and León | |
| 6 | Alcántara Bridge | Highest bridge in the world until the 14th century Bien de Interés Cultural; Height : 50 m (160 ft) | 194 m (636 ft) | Masonry; 6 arches Span : 28.8 m (94 ft) | Road bridge EX-207; Tagus | 106 | Alcántara; 39°43′20.7″N 6°53′32.8″W | Extremadura | |
| 7 | Les Ferreres Aqueduct | Archaeological Ensemble of Tárraco; World Heritage Site (2000); Bien de Interés Cultural | 217 m (712 ft) | Masonry; 2 levels (11 and 25 arches) | Aqueduct; Barranc del Diable | 117 | Tarragona; 41°08′45.8″N 1°14′37.9″E | Catalonia | |
| 8 | Puente Romano, Mérida | World's longest surviving bridge from ancient times Augusta Emerita; World Heritage Site (1993); Bien de Interés Cultural | 721 m (2,365 ft) | Masonry; 60 arches | Footbridge; Guadiana | 2nd century | Mérida; 38°54′49.5″N 6°21′00.1″W | Extremadura | |
| 9 | Alconétar Bridge in ruins | One of the earliest segmental arch bridge | 290 m (950 ft) | Masonry; 14 arches originally | Out of order Tagus | 2nd century | Garrovillas de Alconétar; 39°45′14.3″N 6°26′12.7″W | Extremadura | |
| 10 | Río Bibey Bridge | Via XVIII | 78 m (256 ft) | Masonry; 3 arches | Road bridge OU-636; Río Bibey | 2nd century | A Pobra de Trives; 42°20′01.6″N 7°12′52.1″W | Galicia | |
| 11 | Ponte de Segura | | 41 m (135 ft) | Masonry; 5 arches | Road bridge N355; Río Erjas | 2nd century | Piedras Albas - Segura; 39°49′02.3″N 6°58′54.2″W | Extremadura; Portugal | |
| 12 | Cihuri Roman Bridge | Bien de Interés Cultural | | Masonry; 2 arches | Footbridge; Tirón River | 2nd century | Cihuri; 42°34′06.6″N 2°55′10.6″W | La Rioja | |
| 13 | Puente de Alcántara | Bridge castle Bien de Interés Cultural | | Masonry; 2 arches | Footbridge; Tagus | 3rd century | Toledo; 39°51′24.2″N 4°02′03.0″W | Castile–La Mancha | |
| 14 | Puente de los Peregrinos | Bien de Interés Cultural | 110 m (360 ft) | Masonry; 6 arches | Footbridge; Arga | 11th century | Puente la Reina; 42°40′16.1″N 1°49′07.3″W | Navarre | |
| 15 | Besalú Bridge | Bridge castle Bien de Interés Cultural | 152 m (499 ft) | Masonry; 8 arches Span : 26.4 m (87 ft) | Footbridge; Fluvià | 12th century | Besalú; 42°11′57.7″N 2°42′05.5″E | Catalonia | |
| 16 | Sant Joan de les Abadesses Old Bridge | | 104 m (341 ft) | Masonry; 1 arch Span : 29.9 m (98 ft) | Footbridge; Ter | 12th century | Sant Joan de les Abadesses; 42°14′05.7″N 2°17′05.8″E | Catalonia | |
| 17 | Pedret Bridge | | 80 m (260 ft) | Masonry; 4 arches Span : 14.4 m (47 ft) | Footbridge; Llobregat | 12th century | Cercs; 42°06′22.2″N 1°52′50.5″E | Catalonia | |
| 18 | Burgo Bridge | | 158 m (518 ft) | Masonry; 11 arches Span : 158 m (518 ft) | Footbridge; Lérez | 12th century | Pontevedra; 42°26′08.3″N 8°38′38.4″W | Galicia | |
| 19 | Ponte Vella | Bien de Interés Cultural | 373 m (1,224 ft) | Masonry; 7 arches Span : 43 m (141 ft) | Footbridge; Minho | 1230 | Ourense; 42°20′43.0″N 7°52′07.7″W | Galicia | |
| 20 | Pont del Diable | Devil's Bridge; Bien de Interés Cultural | 130 m (430 ft) | Masonry; 2 arches Span : 37.3 m (122 ft) | Footbridge; Llobregat | 1289 | Martorell; 41°28′30.0″N 1°56′16.1″E | Catalonia | |
| 21 | Puente de Piedra (Zamora) | | 280 m (920 ft) | Masonry; 15 arches | Footbridge; Douro | 13th century | Zamora; 41°29′56.8″N 5°44′53.4″W | Castile and León | |
| 22 | Puente nuevo de Camprodón | | 70 m (230 ft) | Masonry; 6 arches Span : 20.9 m (69 ft) | Footbridge; Ter | 13th century | Camprodon; 42°18′46.2″N 2°21′53.1″E | Catalonia | |
| 23 | Frías Bridge | Bridge castle | 143 m (469 ft) | Masonry; 9 arches | Footbridge; Ebro | 14th century | Frías; 42°46′10.5″N 3°17′38.7″W | Castile and León | |
| 24 | Medina Bridge | Bien de Interés Cultural | | Masonry; 3 arches | Aravalillo | 14th century | Arévalo; 41°04′2″N 4°43′24″W | Castile and León | |
| 25 | Puente de San Martín | Bridge castle Bien de Interés Cultural | | Masonry; 5 arches Span : 40 m (130 ft) | Footbridge; Tagus | 14th century | Toledo; 39°51′24.2″N 4°02′03.0″W | Castile–La Mancha | |
| 26 | Cangas de Onís Roman Bridge | Bien de Interés Cultural | | Masonry; 3 arches | Footbridge; Sella River | 14th century | Cangas de Onís - Parres; 43°21′00.7″N 5°07′55.3″W | Asturias | |
| 27 | Puente de Llierca | | 52 m (171 ft) | Masonry; 2 arches Span : 17.7 m (58 ft) | Footbridge; Llierca | | Montagut; 42°14′50.5″N 2°36′13.7″E | Catalonia | |
| 28 | Puente del Diablo (Cardona) unfinished bridge | Devil's Bridge; Bien de Interés Cultural | 59 m (194 ft) | Masonry; 2 arches Span : 25.5 m (84 ft) | Cardener | 1424 | Cardona; 41°55′10.9″N 1°41′05.5″E | Catalonia | |
| 29 | Puente de Piedra (Zaragoza) | Bien de Interés Cultural | 225 m (738 ft) | Masonry; 7 arches | Road bridge Ebro | 1440 | Zaragoza; 41°39′25.9″N 0°52′31.3″W | Aragon | |
| 30 | Aqueduct of Los Arcos | Bien de Interés Cultural | | Masonry; 2 levels (2 and 6 arches) | Aqueduct; Plaza de la Merced | 1537 | Teruel; 40°20′44.9″N 1°06′22.7″W | Aragon | |
| 31 | Puente de Segovia | Bien de Interés Cultural | | Masonry; 9 arches | Road bridge Manzanares | 1584 | Madrid; 40°24′50.5″N 3°43′22.6″W | Community of Madrid | |
| 32 | Almaraz Bridge | | 127 m (417 ft) | Masonry; 2 arches Span : 38 m (125 ft) | Carretera Nacional N-V; Tagus | 16th century | Almaraz; 39°46′49.7″N 5°41′46.3″W | Extremadura | |
| 33 | Bridge of Toledo | | | Masonry; 9 arches | Footbridge; Manzanares | 1732 | Madrid; 40°23′58.8″N 3°42′53.7″W | Community of Madrid | |
| 34 | Puente Nuevo | Height : 98 m (322 ft) | 66 m (217 ft) | Masonry; 3 arches | Road bridge Calle Armiñán; Guadalevín; El Tajo Gorge | 1785 | Ronda; 36°44′26.5″N 5°09′57.1″W | Andalusia | |
| 35 | El Capricho Park Iron Bridge | Oldest iron bridge in Spain | | Arch; Iron | Footbridge; Parque de El Capricho Lake | 1830 | Madrid; 40°27′25.8″N 3°35′59.1″W | Community of Madrid | |
| 36 | Puente de Isabel II | | 149 m (489 ft) | Arch; Cast iron | Road bridge Guadalquivir | 1852 | Seville; 37°23′10.8″N 6°00′08.7″W | Andalusia | |
| 37 | Águila Aqueduct | | | Masonry; 4 levels (2, 6, 11 and 17 arches) | Aqueduct; Barranco de la Coladilla | 1880 | Nerja; 36°45′29.5″N 3°50′59.3″W | Andalusia | |
| 38 | Mascarat Bridge | | 32 m (105 ft) | Masonry; 1 arch | Road bridge Barranco del Mascarat | 1885 | Pueblo Mascarat; 38°38′13.9″N 0°00′24.0″E | Valencian Community | |
| 39 | Vizcaya Bridge | Oldest known transporter bridge World Heritage Site (2006); Bien de Interés Cultural | 164 m (538 ft) | Suspension; Steel truss Span : 164 m (538 ft) | Nervión | 1893 | Portugalete - Getxo; 43°19′23.6″N 3°01′01.5″W | Basque Country | |
| 40 | Golbardo Bridge | First reinforced concrete bridge with span longer than 10 meters in Spain; Bien de Interés Cultural | 30 m (98 ft) | Arch; Concrete deck arch Span : 30 m (98 ft) | Road bridge Saja | 1903 | Golbardo; 43°20′26.2″N 4°09′13.3″W | Cantabria | |
| 41 | Puente del Chorro | Caminito del Rey; Height : 100 m (330 ft) | 30 m (98 ft) | Arch; Concrete deck arch Span : 30 m (98 ft) | Aqueduct; Embalse Tajo de la Encantada | 1904 | El Chorro; 36°54′58.2″N 4°46′21.2″E | Andalusia | |
| 42 | Segovia Viaduct | | | Arch; Concrete deck arch | Road bridge Calle de Bailén; Calle de Segovia | 1942 | Madrid; 40°24′50.0″N 3°42′49.1″W | Community of Madrid | |
| 43 | Gundián Bridge | Height : 84 m (276 ft) | 167 m (548 ft) | Arch; Concrete deck arch | Zamora-La Coruña Line; Ulla | 1958 | Ponte Ulla; 42°47′05.6″N 8°23′34.5″W | Galicia | |

== Bridges of architectural importance ==
| | Name | Distinction | Length | Type | Carries Crosses | Opened | Location | Autonomous communitie | Ref. |
|---|---|---|---|---|---|---|---|---|---|
| 1 | Puente de La Salve | Design by Daniel Buren | | Cable-stayed; Steel girders deck, steel pylon | Road bridge Estuary of Bilbao | 1972 | Bilbao; 43°16′09.6″N 2°55′54.6″W | Basque Country | |
| 2 | Pasarela de las Glorias Catalanas | CECM Prize (1975) (European Convention of Steel Construction) | 97 m (318 ft) | Cable-stayed; Steel box girder deck, steel pylon | Footbridge; Ronda Litoral | 1974 | Barcelona; 41°24′28.8″N 2°13′12.5″E | Catalonia | |
| 3 | Tirantes Bridge | 125 m (410 ft) | | Cable-stayed; Concrete box girder deck, concrete pylon | Road bridge Lérez | 1995 | Pontevedra; 42°26′04.3″N 8°38′11.6″W | Galicia | |
| 4 | Osormort Viaduct | 11 Underslung spans | 504 m (1,654 ft) | Box girder Underslung prestressed concrete 32+11x40+32 | Eix Transversal; Riera Major | 1995 | Sant Sadurní d'Osormort; 41°53′40.4″N 2°22′29.3″E | Catalonia | |
| 5 | Zubizuri | Design by Santiago Calatrava Valls | 75 m (246 ft) | Arch; Steel tied-arch | Footbridge; Nervión | 1997 | Bilbao; 43°15′58.8″N 2°55′40.0″W | Basque Country | |
| 6 | Puente del Milenio (Orense) | | 275 m (902 ft) | Cable-stayed; Concrete box girder deck, inclined concrete pylons | Road bridge Minho | 2001 | Ourense; 42°20′44.3″N 7°52′27.2″W | Galicia | |
| 7 | GFRP Lleida Pedestrian Bridge | Footbridge Award 2005 | 38 m (125 ft) | Arch; Fiberglass tied-arch Span : 38 m (125 ft) | Footbridge; Madrid–Barcelona HSR | 2001 | Lleida; 41°37′16.1″N 0°36′29.4″E | Catalonia | |
| 8 | Pont Trencat | Footbridge Awards 2005; Puente de Alcántara Premios 2002-2004 | 72 m (236 ft) | Masonry; 1 arch Arch; Weathering steel | Footbridge; Tordera | 2004 | Sant Celoni; 41°40′47.2″N 2°29′13.6″E | Catalonia | |
| 9 | Pasarela del Voluntariado | Design by Javier Manterola | 277 m (909 ft) | Cable-stayed; Steel box girder deck, steel pylon | Footbridge; Ebro | 2008 | Zaragoza; 41°39′54.9″N 0°53′40.8″W | Aragon | |
| 10 | Bridge Pavilion | Design by Zaha Hadid | 260 m (850 ft) | Covered bridge Steel; Span : 185 m (607 ft) | Footbridge; Ebro | 2008 | Zaragoza; 41°40′00.3″N 0°54′17.9″W | Aragon | |
| 11 | Pasarela de Delicias | | 240 m (790 ft) | Suspension; Self-anchored, composite steel/concrete box girder deck, steel pylons 45+45 | Footbridge; Avenida de la Ciudad de Soria | 2008 | Zaragoza; 41°39′33.1″N 0°54′29.5″W | Aragon | |
| 12 | Currents Bridge | 116 m (381 ft) | 138 m (453 ft) | Arch; Steel tied-arch | Road bridge Lérez | 2012 | Pontevedra; 42°26′11.6″N 8°38′53.8″W | Galicia | |
| 13 | Pont de Montolivet | Design by Santiago Calatrava Valls; Cross the City of Arts and Sciences | | Concrete | Road bridge | | Valencia; 39°27′26.3″N 0°21′17.3″W | Valencian Community | |
| 14 | Puente de Matadero (Madrid) | | | Arch; Concrete tied-arch | Footbridge; Manzanares | | Madrid; 40°23′35.6″N 3°42′07.2″W | Community of Madrid | |

== Major road and railway bridges ==
This table presents the structures with spans greater than 100 meters (non-exhaustive list).

| | Name | Span | Length | Type | Carries Crosses | Opened | Location | Autonomous communitie | Ref. |
|---|---|---|---|---|---|---|---|---|---|
| 1 | La Pepa Bridge | 540 m (1,770 ft) | 3,092 m (10,144 ft) | Cable-stayed; Steel box girder deck, concrete pylons 120+200+540+200+120 | Autovía CA-35; Bay of Cádiz | 2015 | Cádiz; 36°31′26.4″N 6°15′34.6″W | Andalusia | |
| 2 | Engineer Carlos Fernández Casado Bridge | 440 m (1,440 ft) | 643 m (2,110 ft) | Cable-stayed; Concrete box girder deck, concrete pylons 65+440+65 | Autovía AP-66; Barrios de Luna Reservoir | 1983 | Sena de Luna - Los Barrios de Luna; 42°53′45.7″N 5°53′17.3″W | Castile and León | |
| 3 | Rande Bridge | 400 m (1,300 ft) | 1,554 m (5,098 ft) | Cable-stayed; Composite steel/concrete deck, concrete pylons 147+400+147 | Autopista AP-9; Ria de Vigo | 1981 | Vigo; 42°17′17.6″N 8°39′38.1″W | Galicia | |
| 4 | Almonte River Viaduct | 384 m (1,260 ft) | 996 m (3,268 ft) | Arch; Concrete deck arch | Lisbon–Madrid HSR; Almonte | 2016 | Cáceres; 39°41′11.3″N 6°27′41.1″W | Extremadura | |
| 5 | Guadiana International Bridge | 324 m (1,063 ft) | 666 m (2,185 ft) | Cable-stayed; Concrete box girder deck, concrete pylons 36+135+324+135+36 | Autovía A-49; Guadiana | | Ayamonte - Castro Marim; 37°14′15.5″N 7°25′12.7″W | Andalusia; Portugal | |
| 6 | Tagus River Viaduct | 324 m (1,063 ft) | 1,488 m (4,882 ft) | Arch; Concrete deck arch | Lisbon–Madrid HSR; Tagus | 2016 | Cáceres; 39°42′59.4″N 6°26′36.0″W | Extremadura | |
| 7 | Castilla–La Mancha Bridge | 318 m (1,043 ft) | 729 m (2,392 ft) | Cable-stayed; Concrete box girder deck, inclined concrete pylon | Tagus | 2011 | Talavera de la Reina; 39°57′03.4″N 4°48′21.4″W | Castilla–La Mancha | |
| 8 | Centenario Bridge | 265 m (869 ft) | 2,016 m (6,614 ft) | Cable-stayed; Concrete girders deck, concrete pylons 48+102+265+102+48 | Circunvalación de Sevilla; Guadalquivir | 1991 | Seville; 37°20′56.8″N 5°59′35.5″W | Andalusia | |
| 9 | Contreras Railway Bridge | 261 m (856 ft) | 587 m (1,926 ft) | Arch; Concrete deck arch | Madrid–Levante HSR; Contreras Reservoir | 2009 | Minglanilla - Villargordo del Cabriel; 39°32′52.5″N 1°30′53.4″W | Castilla–La Mancha; Valencian Community | |
| 10 | Los Tilos Viaduct | 255 m (837 ft) | 319 m (1,047 ft) | Arch; Concrete deck arch | LP-1; Carretera del Norte de La Palma; Barranco del Agua | 2004 | San Andrés y Sauces (La Palma); 28°47′54.2″N 17°46′16.2″W | Canary Islands | |
| 11 | Ulla Viaduct | 240 m (790 ft) | 1,620 m (5,310 ft) | Truss; Steel truss with concrete deck slab 3x120+225+240+225 +3x120 | Atlantic Axis HSR; Ulla | 2015 | Rianxo - Catoira; 42°40′04.8″N 8°43′56.6″W | Galicia | |
| 12 | Alconétar Viaduct | 234 m (768 ft) | 400 m (1,300 ft) | Arch; Steel deck arch Twin bridges | Autovía A-66; Tagus | 2006 | Cáceres; 39°43′09.8″N 6°24′38.3″W | Extremadura | |
| 13 | Third Millennium Bridge | 216 m (709 ft) | 270 m (890 ft) | Arch; Concrete tied-arch | Road bridge Avenue Ranillas; Ebro | 2008 | Zaragoza; 41°39′56.3″N 0°54′30.2″W | Aragon | |
| 14 | Martín Gil Viaduct | 210 m (690 ft) | 408 m (1,339 ft) | Arch; Concrete deck arch | Zamora-La Coruña Line; Esla (Ricobayo Dam Reservoir) | 1942 | Manzanal del Barco - Palacios del Pan; 41°39′03.2″N 5°53′52.9″W | Castile and León | |
| 15 | Alamillo Bridge | 200 m (660 ft) | 250 m (820 ft) | Cable-stayed; Cantilever spar Composite steel/concrete deck, inclined concrete pylon | Circunvalación de Sevilla; Guadalquivir | 1992 | Seville; 37°24′48.1″N 5°59′26.0″W | Andalusia | |
| 16 | Pintor Fierros Viaduct | 190 m (620 ft) | 381 m (1,250 ft) | Arch; Concrete deck arch | Autovía A-8; Río Cabo | 1996 | Ballota; 43°32′44.3″N 6°20′06.7″W | Asturias | |
| 17 | Manzanal del Barco Bridge | 190 m (620 ft) | 479 m (1,572 ft) | Box girder Prestressed concrete 61+114+190+114 | ZA-P-1405; Esla (Ricobayo Dam Reservoir) | 2007 | Manzanal del Barco - Palacios del Pan; 41°37′20.4″N 5°55′40.7″W | Castile and León | |
| 18 | Lusitania Bridge | 189 m (620 ft) | 465 m (1,526 ft) | Arch; Steel tied-arch | Road bridge Guadiana | 1991 | Mérida; 38°55′00.4″N 6°21′13.3″W | Extremadura | |
| 19 | Río Almonte Bridge | 184 m (604 ft) | 432 m (1,417 ft) | Arch; Concrete deck arch Twin bridges | Autovía A-66; Almonte | 2005 | Cáceres; 39°37′00.8″N 6°24′13.2″W | Extremadura | |
| 20 | Puente del Milenario | 180 m (590 ft) | 384 m (1,260 ft) | Box girder Composite steel/concrete 102+180+102 | C-42; Ebro | 1988 | Tortosa; 40°48′13.6″N 0°30′45.9″E | Catalonia | |
| 21 | Tajo River Bridge (A-5) | 175 m (574 ft) | 469 m (1,539 ft) | Box girder Prestressed concrete 65+90+175+87 | Autovía A-5; Tagus | 1997 | Almaraz; 39°46′46.8″N 5°43′57.9″W | Extremadura | |
| 22 | Viaducto de Montabliz | 175 m (574 ft) | 721 m (2,365 ft) | Box girder Prestressed concrete 110+155+175+155+126 | Autovía A-67; Río Bisueña | 2008 | Montabliz; 43°06′12.4″N 4°05′22.0″W | Cantabria | |
| 23 | Narcea River Viaduct | 175 m (574 ft) | 875 m (2,871 ft) | Box girder Prestressed concrete 100+130+160+175 +130+100+80 | Autovía A-63; Narcea | | Cornellana; 43°24′12.0″N 6°09′10.9″W | Asturias | |
| 24 | Minho River Bridge | 170 m (560 ft) | 380 m (1,250 ft) | Box girder Prestressed concrete 105+170+105 | Autovía A-55; Minho | 1993 | Tui - Valença; 42°02′00.2″N 8°39′14.0″W | Galicia; Portugal | |
| 25 | Contreras Viaduct | 170 m (560 ft) | 431 m (1,414 ft) | Truss; Steel truss with concrete deck slab 66+93+170+93; Twin bridges | Autovía A-3; Contreras Reservoir | 1998 | Minglanilla - Villargordo del Cabriel; 39°32′49.2″N 1°30′49.5″W | Castilla–La Mancha; Valencian Community | |
| 26 | Fernández del Campo Enginner Viaduct | 170 m (560 ft) | 357 m (1,171 ft) | Truss; Steel truss with concrete deck slab 93+170+93; Twin bridges | Autovía A-6; Sil | 2000 | Ponferrada; 42°33′59.4″N 6°34′39.3″W | Castile and León | |
| 27 | Puente de la Barqueta | 168 m (551 ft) | 214 m (702 ft) | Arch; Steel tied-arch | Road bridge Guadalquivir | 1992 | Seville; 37°24′15.7″N 5°59′50.2″W | Andalusia | |
| 28 | La Vicaria Arch Bridge | 168 m (551 ft) | 260 m (850 ft) | Arch; CFST through arch | Road bridge Segura | 2007 | Yeste; 38°21′16.5″N 2°15′46.7″W | Castilla–La Mancha | |
| 29 | Viaduto Ulla | 168 m (551 ft) | 630 m (2,070 ft) | Arch; Concrete deck arch | Madrid–Galicia HSR; Ulla | 2012 | Ponte Ulla; 42°47′01.6″N 8°23′37.1″W | Galicia | |
| 30 | Viaduto d'O Eixo | 42.5 m (139 ft) | 1,224.4 m (4,017 ft) | Arch; Concrete deck arch | Madrid–Galicia HSR; Rego de Aríns | 2008 | O Eixo de Arriba; 42°51′11.42″N 8°30′34.32″W | Galicia | |
| 31 | Burguillo Reservoir Arch Bridge | 165 m (541 ft) | 268 m (879 ft) | Arch; Concrete deck arch | N-403 road El Burguillo Reservoir | 2000 | El Tiemblo; 40°25′41.7″N 4°32′21.0″W | Castile and León | |
| 32 | Ricobayo Arch Bridge | 164 m (538 ft) | 219 m (719 ft) | Arch; Composite steel/concrete deck arch | N-122 road Esla (Ricobayo Dam Reservoir) | 1995 | Ricobayo; 41°32′07.0″N 5°58′42.8″W | Castile and León | |
| 33 | Bimil·lenari Bridge | 164 m (538 ft) | | Suspension; Steel box girder deck, concrete pylon | CV-8615; Vinalopó | 2000 | Elche; 38°16′45.5″N 0°42′07.9″W | Valencian Community | |
| 34 | Buendía Lake Bridge | 162 m (531 ft) | 320 m (1,050 ft) | Truss; Steel truss with concrete deck slab 63+162+94 | Road bridge Buendía Reservoir | 2006 | Alcocer - Alcohujate; 40°26′48.7″N 2°37′43.1″W | Castile-La Mancha | |
| 35 | Tamaraceite Bridge | 160 m (520 ft) | 212 m (696 ft) | Arch; Steel through arch | Autovía GC-2 | 1993 | Las Palmas; 28°07′36.7″N 15°27′03.7″W | Canary Islands | |
| 36 | Navia Viaduct | 160 m (520 ft) (x2) | 905 m (2,969 ft) | Arch; Steel tied-arch | Autovía A-8; Navia | 2008 | Navia; 43°31′44.3″N 6°43′25.9″W | Asturias | |
| 37 | Assut de l'Or Bridge | 160 m (520 ft) | 180 m (590 ft) | Cable-stayed; Steel box girder deck, inclined steel pylon | Road bridge Jardín del Turia | 2008 | Valencia; 39°27′17.3″N 0°20′58.8″W | Valencian Community | |
| 38 | Ricobayo Viaduct | 155 m (509 ft) | 368 m (1,207 ft) | Box girder Prestressed concrete 50+155+93+70 | Madrid–Galicia HSR; Esla (Ricobayo Dam Reservoir) | | Perilla de Castro - San Cebrián de Castro; 41°42′26.3″N 5°50′10.4″W | Castile and León | |
| 39 | Los Santos Bridge | 150 m (490 ft) (x3) | 600 m (2,000 ft) | Box girder Prestressed concrete 75+3x150+75 | Autovía A-8 N-634 road Eo (Ría de Ribadeo) | 1987 | Ribadeo - Figueras; 43°32′34.3″N 7°02′00.7″W | Galicia; Asturias | |
| 40 | San Pedro de la Ribera Viaduct | 150 m (490 ft) (x4) | 750 m (2,460 ft) | Box girder Prestressed concrete 75+4x150+75 | Autovía A-8; Río Esqueiro | 1994 | San Pedro de la Ribera; 43°34′06.7″N 6°13′22.8″W | Asturias | |
| 41 | La Concha de Artedo Viaduct (N-632) | 150 m (490 ft) (x4) | 750 m (2,460 ft) | Box girder Prestressed concrete 75+4x150+75 | N-632 National Road; Río Uncín | 1994 | Cudillero; 43°33′19.5″N 6°11′31.3″W | Asturias | |
| 42 | Betanzos Bridge | 150 m (490 ft) (x3) | 1,054 m (3,458 ft) | Box girder Prestressed concrete | Autopista AP-9; Ría de Betanzos | 1996 | Bergondo; 43°19′27.8″N 8°12′14.5″W | Galicia | |
| 43 | Río Tera Viaduct | 150 m (490 ft) | 645 m (2,116 ft) | Arch; Concrete deck V arch | Madrid–Galicia HSR; Tera River | 2015 | Val de Santa María; 41°58′58.6″N 6°13′35.6″W | Castile and León | |
| 44 | Nelson Mandela Bridge (El Prat de Llobregat) | 150 m (490 ft) | 304 m (997 ft) | Arch; Concrete tied-arch | Road bridge Llobregat | 2015 | El Prat de Llobregat; 41°19′18.7″N 2°06′52.4″E | Catalonia | |
| 45 | Miraflores Viaduct | 148 m (486 ft) | | Arch; Concrete deck arch | Road bridge Nervión | 1995 | Bilbao; 43°14′48.5″N 2°55′15.1″W | Basque Country | |
| 46 | Róntegui Bridge | 145 m (476 ft) (x2) | 655 m (2,149 ft) | Box girder Prestressed concrete 115+2x145+85 Twin bridges | Circunvalación norte de Bilbao; Estuary of Bilbao | 1983 | Barakaldo - Erandio; 43°17′43.4″N 2°58′27.0″W | Basque Country | |
| 47 | Puente de la Unión (Zaragoza) | 145 m (476 ft) | 331 m (1,086 ft) | Box girder Prestressed concrete 93+145+93 | Road bridge Ebro | 1989 | Zaragoza; 41°39′10.8″N 0°51′44.0″W | Aragon | |
| 48 | Teror Viaduct | 145 m (476 ft) | 261 m (856 ft) | Extradosed; Concrete box girder deck, concrete pylons 62+145+54 | GC-21; Barranco de Teror | 2010 | Teror (Gran Canaria); 28°04′17.8″N 15°32′04.6″W | Canary Islands | |
| 49 | Cieza Viaduct | 141 m (463 ft) | 233 m (764 ft) | Arch; Concrete deck arch Twin bridges | Autovía A-67; Río Cieza | 2004 | Villayuso de Cieza; 43°13′29.6″N 4°04′45.9″W | Cantabria | |
| 50 | Tablate I Viaduct | 140 m (460 ft) | | Arch; Steel deck arch | Autovía A-44; Barranco de Tablate | 1996 | Tablate; 36°54′50.4″N 3°31′47.7″W | Andalusia | |
| 51 | Samprón Viaduct | 140 m (460 ft) (x3) | 562 m (1,844 ft) | Box girder Prestressed concrete 70+3x140+70 | Autovía A-6; Regueiro do Real | 2001 | Samprón; 42°40′33.8″N 6°58′09.0″W | Castile and León | |
| 52 | Las Lamas Viaduct | 140 m (460 ft) | 337 m (1,106 ft) | Box girder Prestressed concrete 70+140+70+55 | Autovía A-6; Regueiro Pena de Cerveira | 2001 | Samprón; 42°41′29.5″N 6°59′22.9″W | Castile and León | |
| 53 | Cuarto Puente | 140 m (460 ft) | 168 m (551 ft) | Arch; Steel tied-arch | Road bridge Ebro | 2003 | Logroño; 42°28′36.0″N 2°27′39.2″W | La Rioja | |
| 54 | Guiniguada Viaduct | 140 m (460 ft) | | Box girder Prestressed concrete 78+140+70 | Autovía GC-3; Barranco de Guiniguada | 2003 | Las Palmas (Gran Canaria); 28°05′10.7″N 15°26′51.3″W | Canary Islands | |
| 55 | Izbor Highway Viaduct | 140 m (460 ft) | 925 m (3,035 ft) | Box girder Prestressed concrete 65+140+65 | Autovía A-44; Río Ízbor | 2007 | Ízbor; 36°53′37.5″N 3°30′25.3″W | Andalusia | |
| 56 | Arbizelai Viaduct | 140 m (460 ft) | 409 m (1,342 ft) | Cable-stayed; Composite steel/concrete box girder deck, steel pylons 2x59+140+59 | Autopista AP-1; Deba Ibaia | 2008 | Mondragón; 43°02′44.2″N 2°30′00.6″W | Basque Country | |
| 57 | Rules Dam Viaduct | 140 m (460 ft) (x2) | 585 m (1,919 ft) | Truss; Steel truss with concrete deck slab 85+2x140+2x110 | Autovía A-44; Guadalfeo; Rules Reservoir | 2009 | Lanjarón - Vélez de Benaudalla; 36°52′36.3″N 3°28′51.9″W | Andalusia | |
| 58 | Ontinyent Bridge | 140 m (460 ft) | 189 m (620 ft) | Arch; Composite steel/concrete through arch | CV-660; Ronda Oeste de Ontinyent; Río Clariano | 2011 | Ontinyent; 38°49′01.7″N 0°37′04.8″W | Valencian Community | |
| 59 | Río Guadalfeo Arch Bridge | 140 m (460 ft) | | Arch; Steel tied-arch | Autovía A-7; Guadalfeo | 2011 | Lobres; 36°46′26.7″N 3°33′16.3″W | Andalusia | |
| 60 | Sancho El Mayor Bridge | 137 m (449 ft) | | Cable-stayed; Concrete box girder deck, concrete pylon | Autopista AP-15; Ebro | 1978 | Castejón; 42°10′17.4″N 1°40′18.4″W | Navarre | |
| 61 | Puente Real | 136 m (446 ft) | 448 m (1,470 ft) | Cable-stayed; Concrete box girder deck, concrete pylon 136+88 | Road bridge Guadiana | 1994 | Badajoz; 38°52′34.5″N 6°59′34.5″W | Extremadura | |
| 62 | Abbas Ibn Firnás Bridge (Córdoba) | 135 m (443 ft) (x2) | 365 m (1,198 ft) | Arch; Steel tied-arch | Autovía CO-32; Guadalquivir | 2011 | Córdoba; 37°50′50.3″N 4°48′16.7″W | Andalusia | |
| 63 | Amposta Suspension Bridge | 134 m (440 ft) | | Suspension; Steel deck, masonry pylons | N-340A; National road Ebro | 1921 | Amposta; 40°42′53.5″N 0°34′54.1″E | Catalonia | |
| 64 | Buelna Viaduct | 134 m (440 ft) | 367 m (1,204 ft) | Cable-stayed; Concrete deck, inclined concrete pylons | CA-170; Río Besaya | 2009 | Barros; 43°17′04.2″N 4°04′03.9″W | Cantabria | |
| 65 | Los Carneros Viaduct | 132 m (433 ft) (x2) | 561 m (1,841 ft) | Truss; Steel truss with concrete deck slab 99+132+132+110+88 | N-430 road Guadiana | 2008 | Puerto Peña; 39°08′14.6″N 5°10′54.6″W | Extremadura | |
| 66 | Río Deza Viaduct | 131 m (430 ft) | 1,175 m (3,855 ft) | Arch; Concrete deck V arch | Madrid–Galicia HSR; Río Deza | 2009 | Silleda; 42°44′24.8″N 8°13′50.7″W | Galicia | |
| 67 | Azufre Viaduct | 130 m (430 ft) | 260 m (850 ft) | Box girder Prestressed concrete 65+130+65 | Carretera Nacional N-VI; Sil | 1977 | Ponferrada; 42°33′49.9″N 6°34′54.1″W | Castile and León | |
| 68 | Sama de Langreo Bridge | 130 m (430 ft) | 630 m (2,070 ft) | Cable-stayed; Concrete box girder deck, concrete pylon 130+65 | AS-117; Autovía AS-117; Nalón | 1991 | Sama; 43°17′54.4″N 5°41′01.2″W | Asturias | |
| 69 | Puente de la Exposición | 130 m (430 ft) | 163 m (535 ft) | Arch; Steel tied-arch | Road bridge Jardín del Turia | 1995 | Valencia; 39°28′23.2″N 0°21′57.6″W | Valencian Community | |
| 70 | Palma del Río Bridge | 130 m (430 ft) | 436 m (1,430 ft) | Arch; Steel tied-arch | A-453; Guadalquivir | 2008 | Palma del Río; 37°43′18.7″N 5°17′12.7″W | Andalusia | |
| 71 | Gorostiza Viaduct | 130 m (430 ft) | 190 m (620 ft) | Box girder Composite steel/concrete Twin bridges | Autopista AP-8; Gorostiza | 2011 | Barakaldo; 43°16′08.2″N 2°59′48.3″W | Basque Country | |
| 72 | Barbantiño Viaduct | 128 m (420 ft) (x4) | 780 m (2,560 ft) | Box girder Prestressed concrete 82+4x128+82 | Autovía AG-53; Río Barbantiño | 2009 | Maside; 42°23′17.2″N 7°59′30.3″W | Galicia | |
| 73 | Cadagua Viaducts; 5 viaducts | 127 m (417 ft) | 364 m 365 m 303 m 455 m 315 m | Box girder Composite steel/concrete 79+103+100+82; 83+105+97+80; 3x82+127+94 79+103+105+102+66; 47+91+97+80 | Autopista AP-8; Cadagua | 2011 | Bilbao; 43°15′04.2″N 2°58′28.6″W | Basque Country | |
| 74 | Cristo de la Expiración Bridge | 126 m (413 ft) | 225 m (738 ft) | Arch; Steel deck arch | Road bridge Guadalquivir | 1991 | Seville; 37°23′25.4″N 6°00′22.9″W | Andalusia | |
| 75 | Escudo River Bridge | 126 m (413 ft) | 229 m (751 ft) | Arch; CFST deck arch | Autovía A-8; Río Escudo | 1999 | San Vicente de la Barquera; 43°21′15.5″N 4°23′05.1″W | Cantabria | |
| 76 | Colindres Viaduct | 125 m (410 ft) (x2) | 418 m (1,371 ft) | Cable-stayed; Concrete box girder deck, 3 concrete pylons 50+2x125+50 | Autovía A-8; Asón | 1993 | Colindres - Treto; 43°23′28.3″N 3°27′51.4″W | Cantabria | |
| 77 | Puente del Navío | 125 m (410 ft) | 847 m (2,779 ft) | Box girder Prestressed concrete 50+125+50 | Road bridge Bay of Gibraltar | 1999 | Algeciras; 36°08′53.0″N 5°26′30.9″W | Andalusia | |
| 78 | Tablate II Viaduct | 125 m (410 ft) | 175 m (574 ft) | Arch; Steel deck arch | Autovía A-44; Barranco de Tablate | 2002 | Tablate; 36°54′47.4″N 3°31′48.6″W | Andalusia | |
| 79 | Basagoiti Viaduct | 125 m (410 ft) | 427 m (1,401 ft); 390 m (1,280 ft) | Box girder Prestressed concrete 70+125+124+70; 64+109+70 | Autopista AP-1; Baskolia Erreka | 2008 | Aretxabaleta; 43°02′20.0″N 2°30′36.8″W | Basque Country | |
| 80 | Trapagaran Viaduct | 125 m (410 ft) (x4) | 670 m (2,200 ft) | Box girder Prestressed concrete 95+4x125+80 | Autopista AP-8 | 2010 | Valle de Trápaga; 43°17′48.7″N 3°01′16.9″W | Basque Country | |
| 81 | Tina Menor Viaduct | 125 m (410 ft) | 378 m (1,240 ft) | Box girder Composite steel/concrete 64+125+125+64 | Autovía A-8; Ría Tina Menor | | Pesués; 43°22′14.4″N 4°29′01.6″W | Cantabria | |
| 82 | Zuera Bridge (Zaragoza) | 125 m (410 ft) | 305 m (1,001 ft) | Arch; Steel tied-arch 40+50+125+50+40 | Madrid–Barcelona HSR (Huesca branch); Ebro | | Zaragoza; 41°39′02.8″N 0°51′12.3″W | Aragon | |
| 83 | Río Nalón Viaduct | 124 m (407 ft) | 1,101 m (3,612 ft) | Box girder Composite steel/concrete 76+124+76+13x60 | Autovía A-8; Nalón | 2007 | Soto del Barco; 43°31′09.0″N 6°04′34.9″W | Asturias | |
| 84 | Tenoya Viaduct | 124 m (407 ft) (x3) | 528 m (1,732 ft) | Box girder Prestressed concrete 78+3x124+78 | Autovía GC-3; Barranco de Tenoya | 2013 | Tenoya (Gran Canaria); 28°06′39.9″N 15°29′56.3″W | Canary Islands | |
| 85 | Puente de Requejo | 120 m (390 ft) | 190 m (620 ft) | Arch; Steel truss deck arch | ZA-321; Douro | 1914 | Pino del Oro - Villadepera; 41°33′38.6″N 6°07′47.3″W | Castile and León | |
| 86 | Cuesta de Silva Viaduct | 120 m (390 ft) | 416 m (1,365 ft) | Box girder Prestressed concrete 58+90+120+90+58; 50+109+114+109+50; Twin bridges | Autovía GC-2; Barranco del Calabozo | 1979; 2010 | San Felipe (La Palma); 28°08′23.3″N 15°35′53.4″W | Canary Islands | |
| 87 | Benamejí Viaduct | 120 m (390 ft) | 288 m (945 ft) | Box girder Prestressed concrete 84+120+84 | Autovía A-45; Genil | 1994 | Benamejí; 37°14′36.6″N 4°32′25.2″W | Andalusia | |
| 88 | Puente de la Hispanidad | 120 m (390 ft) | 156 m (512 ft) | Cable-stayed; Concrete deck and pylons | Road bridge Avenue de Zamora; Pisuerga | 1999 | Valladolid; 41°37′35.7″N 4°45′27.7″W | Castile and León | |
| 89 | Osera de Ebro Bridge | 120 m (390 ft) | 546 m (1,791 ft) | Vierendeel; Concrete | Madrid–Barcelona HSR; Ebro | 2002 | Osera de Ebro; 41°31′01.9″N 0°34′28.7″W | Aragon | |
| 90 | Iregua River Bridge | 120 m (390 ft) | 304 m (997 ft) | Cable-stayed; Concrete deck, steel pylon | Autovía LO-20; Río Iregua | 2002 | Logroño; 42°27′21.7″N 2°25′04.5″W | La Rioja | |
| 91 | Manuel Giménez Abad Bridge | 120 m (390 ft) | | Arch; Steel tied-arch 40+120+52+40 | Circunvalación de Zaragoza; Ebro | 2002 | Zaragoza; 41°39′03.8″N 0°51′16.7″W | Aragon | |
| 92 | Arroyo del Valle Viaduct | 120 m (390 ft) | 1,755 m (5,758 ft) | Arch; Concrete deck V arch | Madrid–León HSR; Arroyo del Valle | 2006 | Soto del Real - Miraflores de la Sierra; 40°44′57.1″N 3°44′29.0″W | Community of Madrid | |
| 93 | Los Mellizos Viaduct | 120 m (390 ft) | 738 m (2,421 ft) | Arch; Concrete deck V arch Twin bridges | Autovía AP-46; Río Cauche | 2011 | Arroyo Coche; 36°52′27.1″N 4°28′57.7″W | Andalusia | |
| 94 | Arga River Bridge (A-12) | 120 m (390 ft) | 300 m (980 ft) | Arch; Steel deck arch | Autovía A-12; Arga | 2013 | Puente la Reina; 42°40′37.3″N 1°49′23.3″W | Navarre | |
| 95 | Ebro River Bridge (A-12) | 120 m (390 ft) | 353 m (1,158 ft) | Arch; Steel tied-arch | Autovía A-12; Ebro | 2014 | Logroño - Viana; 42°27′49.0″N 2°22′11.4″W | La Rioja; Navarre | |
| 96 | Elche Ronda Sud Bridge | 120 m (390 ft) | | Arch; Steel tied-arch | Circunvalación de Elche; Vinalopó | 2014 | Elche; 38°14′58.6″N 0°42′08.0″W | Valencian Community | |
| 97 | Ria Bridge | 120 m (390 ft) (x2) | 700 m (2,300 ft) | Box girder Prestressed concrete | Autopista AP-9; Ria de Pontevedra; Lérez | | Pontevedra; 42°25′35.5″N 8°39′17.0″W | Galicia | |
| 98 | Ontón Viaduct | 120 m (390 ft) | 267 m (876 ft) | Box girder Prestressed concrete 72+120+72; Twin bridges | Autovía A-8 | | Ontón; 43°21′12.8″N 3°10′10.7″W | Cantabria | |
| 99 | Águeda International Bridge | 115 m (377 ft) | | Arch; Steel tied-arch | Road bridge Águeda | 2000 | La Fregeneda - Barca de Alva; 41°01′32.1″N 6°55′47.4″W | Castile and León; Portugal | |
| 100 | Cauche River Viaduct | 115 m (377 ft) | 753 m (2,470 ft) | Arch; Concrete deck V arch Twin bridges | Autovía AP-46; Río Cauche | 2011 | Casabermeja; 36°53′18.3″N 4°28′08.9″W | Andalusia | |
| 101 | Andalucía Bridge (Córdoba) | 114 m (374 ft) | 444 m (1,457 ft) | Cable-stayed; Concrete box girder deck, concrete pylon 114+90 | A-3050; Ronda poniente-norte de Córdoba; Guadalquivir | 2004 | Córdoba; 37°51′37.0″N 4°47′29.5″W | Andalusia | |
| 102 | Tajo River Viaduct (Talavera de la Reina) | 114 m (374 ft) | 254 m (833 ft) | Box girder Composite steel/concrete 56+114+56 | Variante Suroeste de N-502; Tagus | 2015 | Talavera de la Reina; 39°56′22.2″N 4°50′49.4″W | Castile-La Mancha | |
| 103 | Euskalduna Bridge | 113 m (371 ft) | 263 m (863 ft) | Box girder Composite steel/concrete 75+113+75 | Road bridge Estuary of Bilbao | 1997 | Bilbao; 43°16′03.1″N 2°56′47.9″W | Basque Country | |
| 104 | Lanjarón Viaduct | 112 m (367 ft) | 112 m (367 ft) | Arch; Steel tied-arch | A-348; Barranco de Tablate | 2001 | Tablate; 36°55′20.1″N 3°31′34.9″W | Andalusia | |
| 105 | Arenal Bridge (Córdoba) | 110 m (360 ft) | 230 m (750 ft) | Box girder Steel; 55+110+55 | Road bridge Guadalquivir | 1993 | Córdoba; 37°52′28.5″N 4°46′13.0″W | Andalusia | |
| 106 | Sant Ermengol Bridge | 110 m (360 ft) | 292 m (958 ft) | Box girder Composite steel/concrete 50+66+110+66 | C-14; Segre (Embalse de Oliana) | 2005 | Oliana; 42°06′25.3″N 1°17′57.7″E | Catalonia | |
| 107 | Galindo River Bridge | 110 m (360 ft) | 110 m (360 ft) | Arch; Steel tied-arch | Road bridge Galindo | 2007 | Barakaldo - Sestao; 43°18′12.6″N 2°58′55.8″W | Basque Country | |
| 108 | Deba River Bridge | 110 m (360 ft) | | Arch; Steel tied-arch | GI-638; Deba River | 2007 | Deba; 43°17′29.2″N 2°21′41.2″W | Basque Country | |
| 109 | Word Bridge | 110 m (360 ft) | 170 m (560 ft) | Box girder Composite steel/concrete, V-shaped legs | Road bridge Lérez | 2011 | Pontevedra; 42°26′48.7″N 8°37′39.3″W | Galicia | |
| 110 | Arnoia River Railway Bridge | 110 m (360 ft) | 1,014 m (3,327 ft) | Arch; Concrete deck V arch | Madrid–Galicia HSR; Arnoia | 2013 | Baños de Molgas; 42°13′37.6″N 7°42′30.5″W | Galicia | |
| 111 | Erques Viaduct | 110 m (360 ft) | 110 m (360 ft) | Arch; CFST tied-arch | Autopista TF-1; Barranco de Erques | 2015 | Tijoco Bajo (Tenerife); 28°09′48.4″N 16°46′12.3″W | Canary Islands | |
| 112 | Porta d’Europa | 109 m (358 ft) | | Bascule bridge Steel | Road bridge Ronda del Port; Port of Barcelona | 2000 | Barcelona; 41°21′53.9″N 2°10′52.9″E | Catalonia | |
| 113 | Sella River Bridge | 106 m (348 ft) | 530 m (1,740 ft) | Box girder Prestressed concrete 56+106+74+3x65+56 | Autovía A-8; Sella River | 2002 | Llovio; 43°26′06.1″N 5°03′43.0″W | Asturias | |
| 114 | Barranco de la Cuesta Viaduct | 106 m (348 ft) | 621 m (2,037 ft) | Arch; Concrete deck V arch | Autovía A-7; Barranco de la Cuesta | 2006 | Almuñécar; 36°45′31.4″N 3°40′25.1″W | Andalusia | |
| 115 | Río Verde Viaduct | 106 m (348 ft) | 563 m (1,847 ft) | Arch; Concrete deck V arch | Autovía A-7; Río Verde | 2006 | Almuñécar; 36°46′00.1″N 3°41′01.7″W | Andalusia | |
| 116 | Río Seco Viaduct | 106 m (348 ft) | 563 m (1,847 ft) | Arch; Concrete deck V arch | Autovía A-7; Río Verde | 2006 | Almuñécar; 36°45′50.3″N 3°42′02.9″W | Andalusia | |
| 117 | La Arena Viaduct | 105 m (344 ft) (x5) | 667 m (2,188 ft) | Cable-stayed; Composite steel/concrete box girder deck, 6 steel pylons 70+5x105+70 | Autovía A-8; Rio Barbadun | 1992 | Muskiz; 43°20′26.0″N 3°06′45.7″W | Basque Country | |
| 118 | Peramola Suspension Bridge | 102 m (335 ft) | 102 m (335 ft) | Suspension; Concrete deck and pylons | Road bridge Segre | 1984 | Oliana; 42°03′52.6″N 1°17′47.8″E | Catalonia | |
| 119 | Puerta de Las Rozas Bridge | 102 m (335 ft) | 123 m (404 ft) | Cable-stayed; Composite steel/concrete deck, steel pylon | Road bridge Autovía A-6 | 2007 | Las Rozas de Madrid; 40°30′33.7″N 3°52′43.6″W | Community of Madrid | |
| 120 | Ría de Noia Viaduct | 102 m (335 ft) | 1,657 m (5,436 ft) | Cable-stayed; Concrete box girder deck, concrete pylons | AC-549; Bogalleira Bay | 2012 | Noia; 42°47′31.4″N 8°54′14.1″W | Galicia | |
| 121 | Castejón Bridge | 101 m (331 ft) | 252 m (827 ft) | Box girder Prestressed concrete 25+101+50 | N-113 road Ebro | 1968 | Castejón; 42°10′50.3″N 1°41′42.8″W | Navarre | |
| 122 | Martorell Bridge | 100 m (330 ft) | 200 m (660 ft) | Box girder Composite steel/concrete 50+100+50 | C-243c; Llobregat | 1975 | Martorell; 41°28′25.6″N 1°56′18.4″E | Catalonia | |
| 123 | Reina Sofía Bridge | 100 m (330 ft) | | Box girder Prestressed concrete | Circunvalación de Sevilla; Guadalquivir | 1991 | Seville; 37°22′20.2″N 6°01′21.0″W | Andalusia | |
| 124 | Sagar Bridge | 100 m (330 ft) | 162 m (531 ft) | Arch; Concrete deck arch | Autopista AP-1; Sagar Erreka | 2002 | Eibar; 43°10′20.1″N 2°25′30.3″E | Basque Country | |
| 125 | Escaleritas Viaduct | 100 m (330 ft) | 220 m (720 ft) | Cable-stayed; Composite steel/concrete box girder deck, concrete pylon | Road bridge Ballena Tunnel | 2006 | Las Palmas; 28°06′27.1″N 15°26′36.8″W | Canary Islands | |
| 126 | Arriaca Bridge | 100 m (330 ft) | 201 m (659 ft) | Cable-stayed; Composite steel/concrete box girder deck, steel pylon 100+42+58 | Autovía CM-10; Henares | 2006 | Guadalajara; 40°39′15.2″N 3°10′12.9″W | Castilla-La Mancha | |
| 127 | Endarlatsa Bridge | 100 m (330 ft) | 190 m (620 ft) | Arch; Composite steel/concrete deck arch | N-121 road Bidasoa | 2009 | Zalain; 43°17′36.7″N 1°43′45.5″W | Navarre | |
| 128 | Guadiana River Bridge (A-5) | 100 m (330 ft) (x3) | 552 m (1,811 ft) | Box girder Prestressed concrete 60+3x100+60 Twin bridges | Autovía A-5; Guadiana | | Mérida; 38°55′43.2″N 6°22′07.1″W | Extremadura | |

Comparison between the La Constitución de 1812 Bridge along with the Carlos Fdez. Casado and the Rande Bridge.

== Notes and references ==
- Notes
- "Bien de Interés Cultural" (in Spanish).
- Nicolas Janberg. "International Database for Civil and Structural Engineering". Structurae.com.
- Others references

== See also ==
- List of Roman bridges
- List of aqueducts in the Roman Empire
- Transport in Spain
- Rail transport in Spain
- Highways in Spain
- List of national roads in Spain
- Geography of Spain
- Puentes de Sevilla (in Spanish) - Bridges of Seville
