= Segura Bridge =

Segura Bridge Ponte de Segura
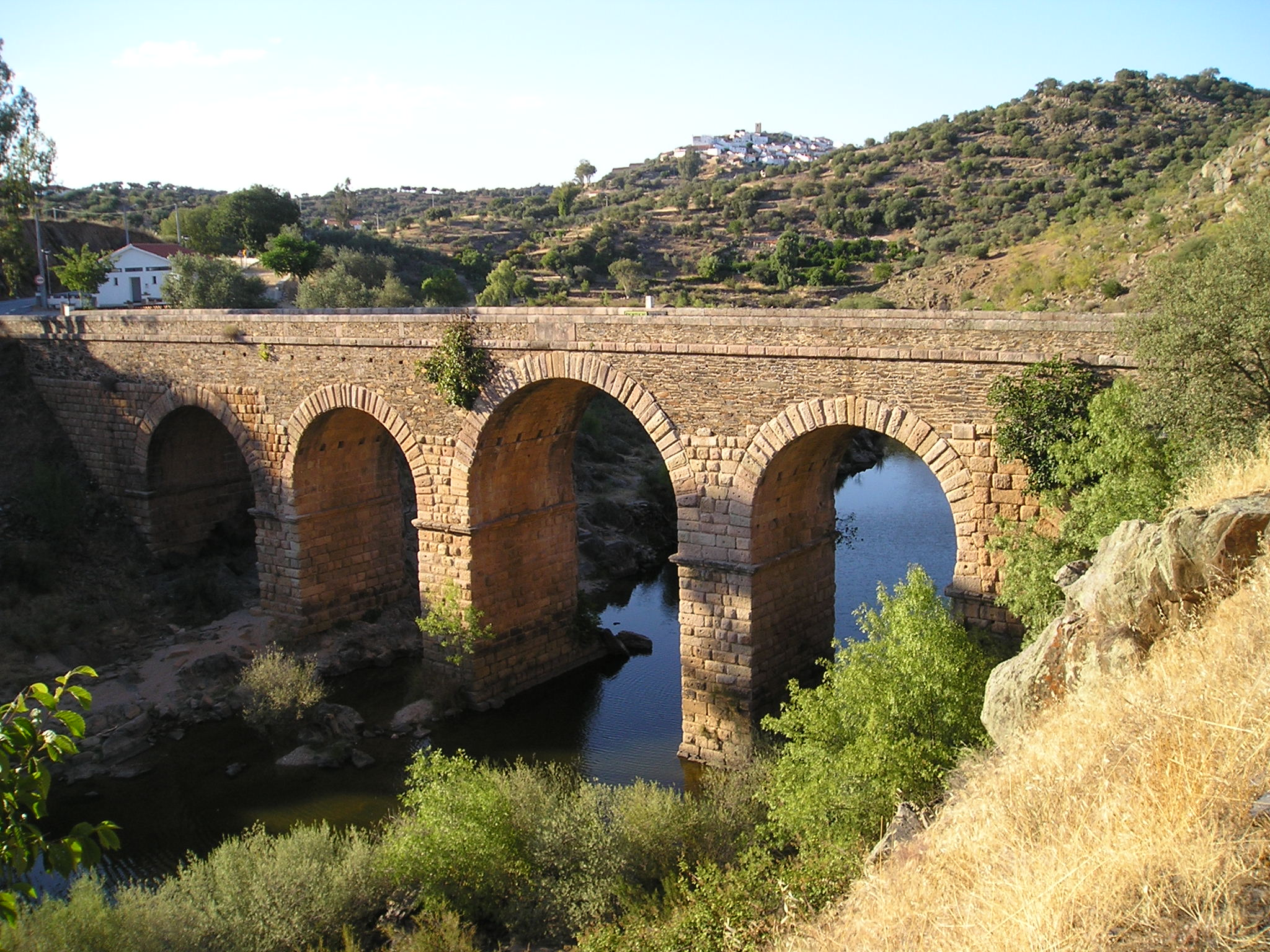
- Coordinates: 39.8173°N 6.9817°W
- Locale: Castelo Branco District, Portugal.; Alcántara, Spain

Location
- Interactive map of Segura Bridge

Segura Bridge is a Roman bridge connecting Segura, in Idanha-a-Nova, Portugal, to the Spanish municipality of Alcántara. The bridge was built over the Erges river, a tributary of the Tagus. It has five arches; only two of the original Roman arches, the ones closer to both river banks, survive to this day, with the rest being added during reconstructions in the 16th and 19th centuries. The stonemason work done during the 1571 reconstruction of two of the arches is considered to be "barely distinguishable" from the original.

== Location ==
Located on the border between Spain and Portugal, on the Spanish side the bridge is situated within the municipality of Alcántara in the province of Cáceres. It can be reached via the regional road EX-207 from the nearby town of Piedras Albas. On the Portuguese side, it connects to a local road leading to the town of Segura, from which the bridge takes its name.

== Construction and Features ==
The bridge was built in the Roman province of Lusitania to extend the Roman road that connected Norba Caesarina, along the Vía de la Plata, with the civitas Egitania (Idanha-a-Velha, Portugal) and Bracara Augusta (Braga, Portugal). Its purpose was to span the Erjas River, whose course delineates the border between Spain and Portugal. Thus, the bridge served as an international crossing point between the two countries.

The bridge was constructed over the gorge created by the Erjas river in the local slate. It comprises five arches with barrel vaults; the central arch spans 10.5 m, which is larger than the 7.5 m of the four side arches. Its structure is made of ashlar masonry with cushioned pink granite blocks, measuring 2.85 to 3 m in section. The two arches on the edges are original Roman constructions, as are all the piers, while the other three arches have been rebuilt during the Middle Ages and the Modern Age. The bridge features triangular section cutwaters up to a height of 1.20 m from the piers.

The bridge's state of preservation is good, and it remains in use. However, in 2007, there was some controversy over actions taken on the footings and cutwaters of the piers, which were covered with reinforced concrete.

== See also ==
- List of Roman bridges
- List of bridges in Spain
- List of bridges in Portugal

== Sources ==
- Fuentes, Manuel Durán (2003). "An endeavour to identify Roman bridges built in former Hispania" (PDF). Instituto Juan de Herrera: 775–786.
- Fuentes, Manuel Durán (2016). "Puentes Romanos en Castilla-La Mancha: Problemas en Torno a Su Identificación". In Carrasco Serrano, Gregorio (ed.). Vías de comunicación romanas en Castilla-La Mancha (in Spanish). University of Castilla–La Mancha. ISBN 978-84-9044-197-8 – via Google Books.
- Mantas, Vasco Gil (2019). "Da Capital da Lusitânia a Bracara Augusta Pela Serra da Estrela". Conímbriga (in Portuguese). 58: 255–300. doi:10.14195/1647-8657_58_8.
