= Ulla Viaduct =

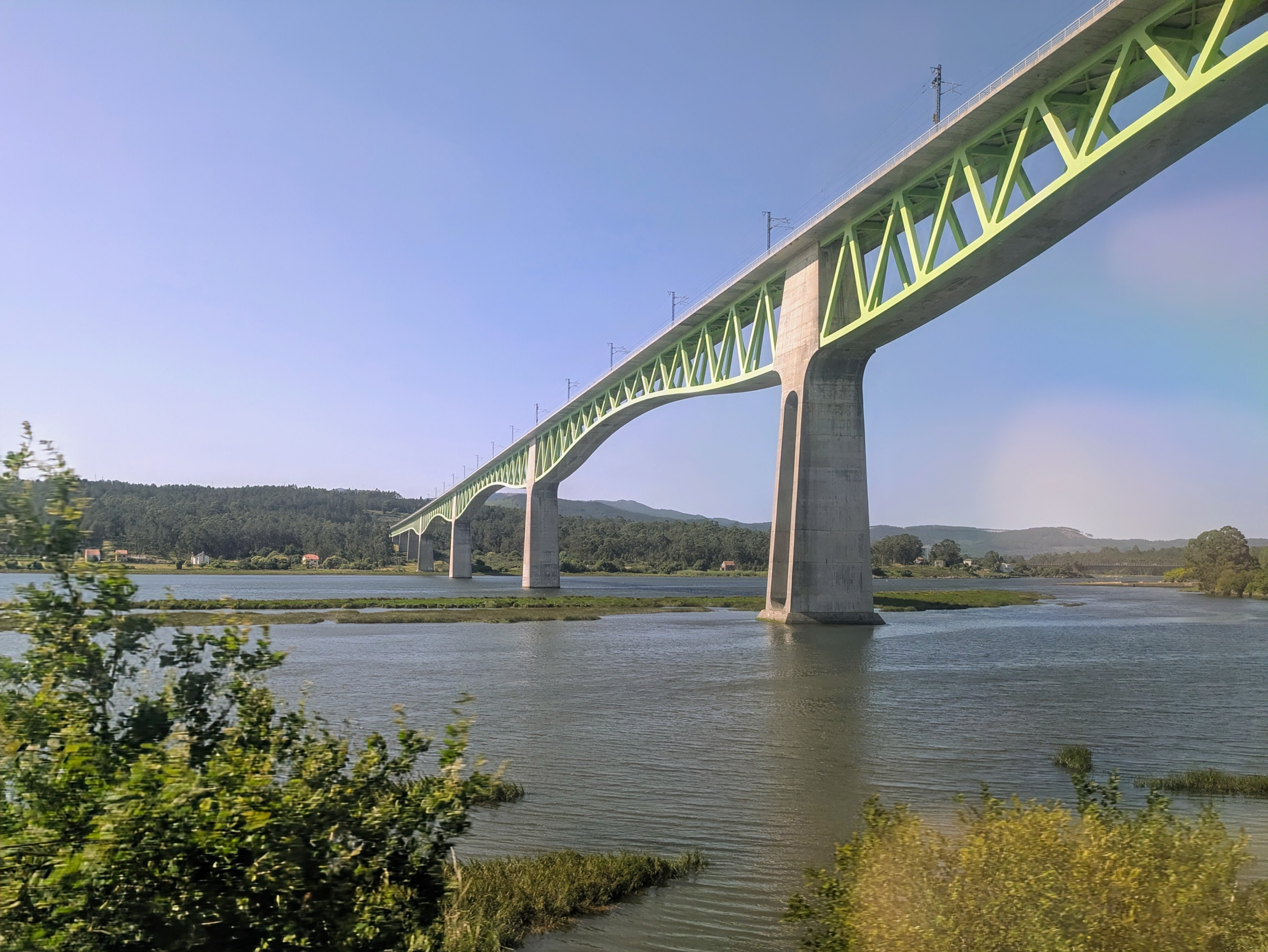
- Coordinates: 42°40′04.0″N 8°43′59.6″W
- Crosses: Ulla river
- Owner: ADIF

History
- Inaugurated: 2015

The Ulla Viaduct is a composite truss bridge that spans the Ulla river, in Galicia, northern Spain. It is a part of the Atlantic Axis, a high-speed rail line.

It is composed of 3 main spans of 225 meters, 240 meters and 225 meters, making the principal span one of the largest in the world—the bridge also holds multiple records. The structure received several awards during construction for avoiding impact on local ecosystems.

== Structure ==
The bridge is a composite featuring a steel truss built on a concrete deck. In addition to the three main spans, there are four more minor spans on each side, three of them 120 meters in length, the other five 80 meters. One side also has an extra span on one side of 50 meters. Only the main spans are supported by pillars in the riverbed, all of the ancillary spans are anchored on the banks on either side.

The union pillar-deck of the main spans of the viaduct is rigid, something which is typically avoided to prevent the movement of the spans from applying torque to the pillars, but because the spans are different lengths, their motion cannot be compensated for in the center of the bridge and so the rigid spans allow for the pillars instead to compensate and maintain the stability of the bridge. Usually forces within the bridge end up transferred to the shorter span as a result of this.

To ensure that the pillars are capable of dealing with these greater forces resulting from the uneven lengths of spans, the fifth and ninth pillars were built with two parallel walls instead of the ordinary designs used on the other pillars. Because this concentrates the mass of those pillars along the edges, it saved on the concrete necessary to improve those pillars' resistance to being torqued by the spans.

== Location ==
The viaduct is located in the section of the railway line between Vilagarcía and Arousa-Padrón. Since it is near the Arousa Estuary, which has extraordinarily beautiful surroundings subjected to strict environmental protection, it induced the Directorate General for Railways to shortlist an ideas competition. The constructive project that won the competition was realized by IDEAM, the construction management was done by ADIF Alta Velocidad and the Dirección General de Ferrocarriles - Ministerio de Fomento, and finally, the construction work was done by UTE Dragados-TECSA. The project managers were Rubén A. Estévez (ADIF AV) and Marina Soler (Ineco), along with Imanol Güemes as the construction manager. The viaduct began operation on March 30, 2015.

== Records and awards ==
The viaduct currently holds the world record in the typology of high-speed composite truss bridge, beating the Nantenbach Bridge over the Main in Germany, which had held the record since 1993 with a 208m span.

It is a finalist in the Outstanding Structure Award 2016, managed by the International Association for Bridge and Structural Engineering (IABSE). This award recognize the most prominent and outstanding structures around the world and it is the first time that a structure designed and constructed in Spain has received this award.

It has also received the San Telmo award in 2015, by the Colegio de Ingenieros de Caminos, Canales y Puertos de Galicia, which distinguishes the best engineering structures constructed in the Comunidad Autónoma de Galicia, taking into account its technical quality, construction procedure and impact on the Galician society.
