= Gundián Bridge =

Bridge in Galicia, Spain

Gundián Bridge Puente de Gundián
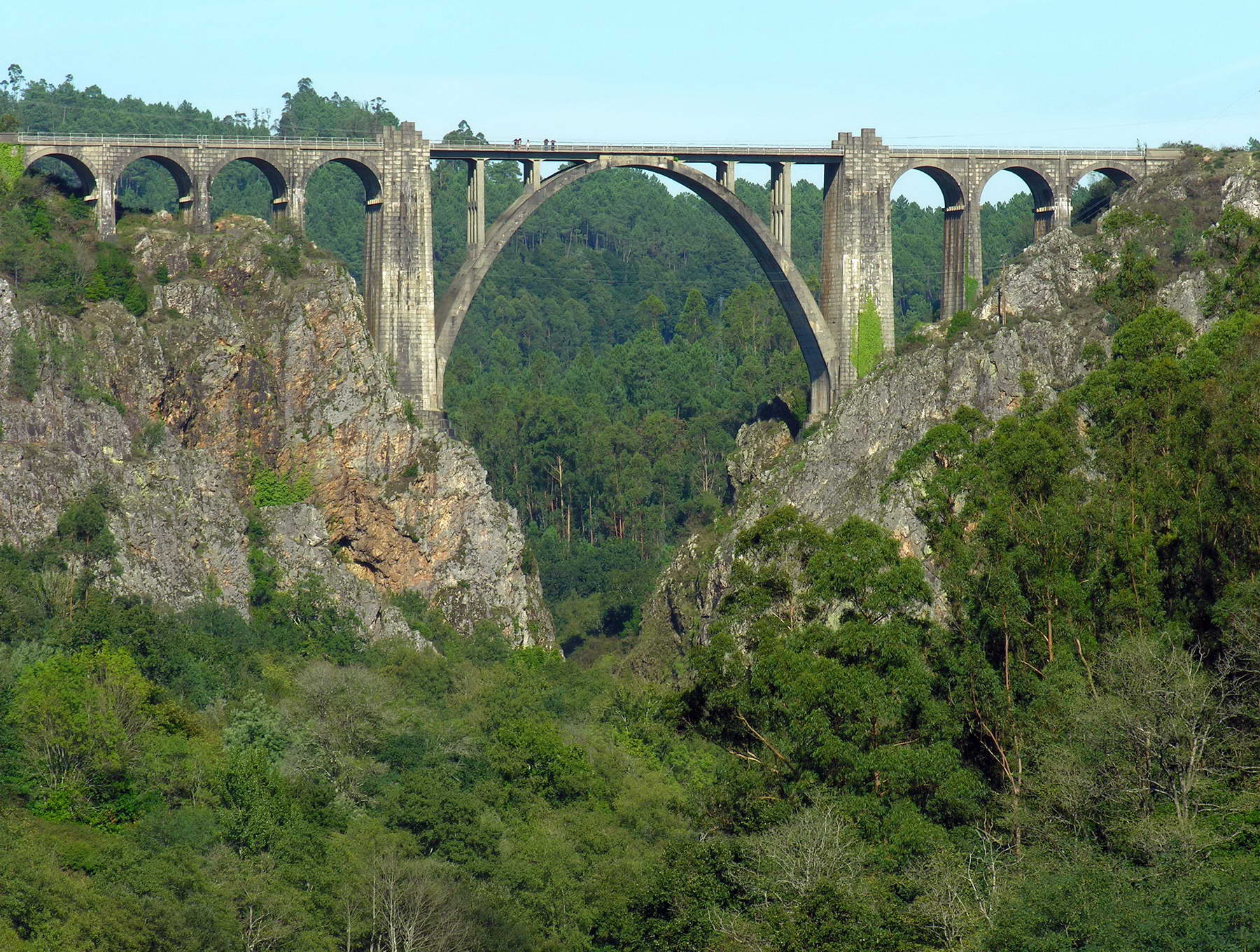
- Coordinates: 42°47′06″N 8°23′35″W
- Carries: Zamora–A Coruña railway line
- Crosses: Ulla River
- Locale: Vedra, A Coruña Province – A Estrada, Pontevedra Province, Spain
- Other name(s): Gundián Viaduct; Viaducto de Gundián

Characteristics
- Design: Arch bridge
- Material: Stone, concrete

Location
- Interactive map of Gundián Bridge

The Gundián Bridge (Spanish: Puente de Gundián), also known as Gundián Viaduct (Spanish: Viaducto de Gundián), is a bridge crossing the Ulla river in Spain, on the old railway between Ourense and Santiago de Compostela.

== History ==
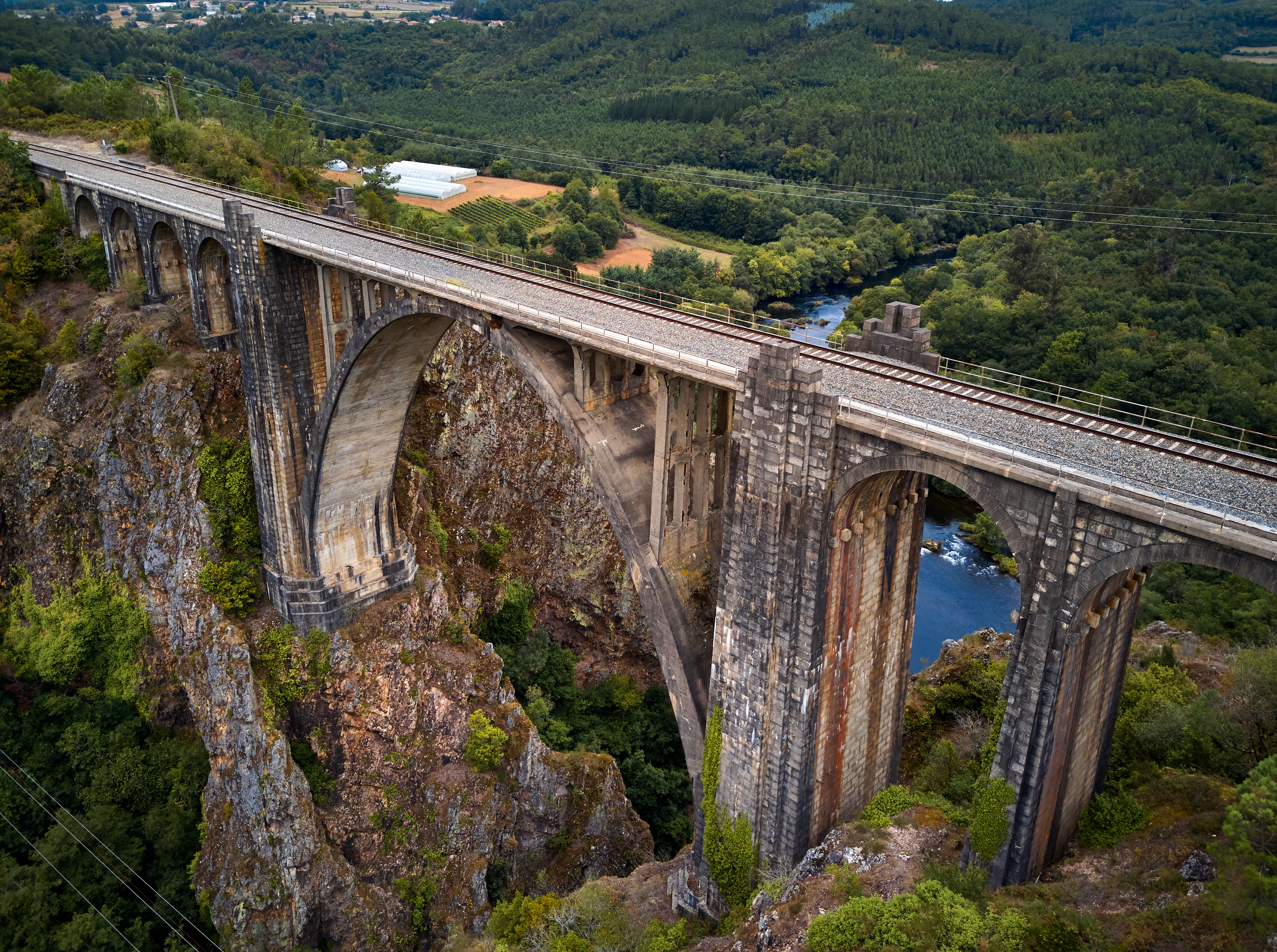
The Bridge

The bridge's builder was Ricardo Barredo de Valenuela, who was linked to Eduardo Torroja.

Workers typically had two shifts, from 4 a.m. to 2 p.m. and from 2 p.m. to 10 p.m. The work sometimes continued after dark under streetlights, and a third shift was occasionally added.

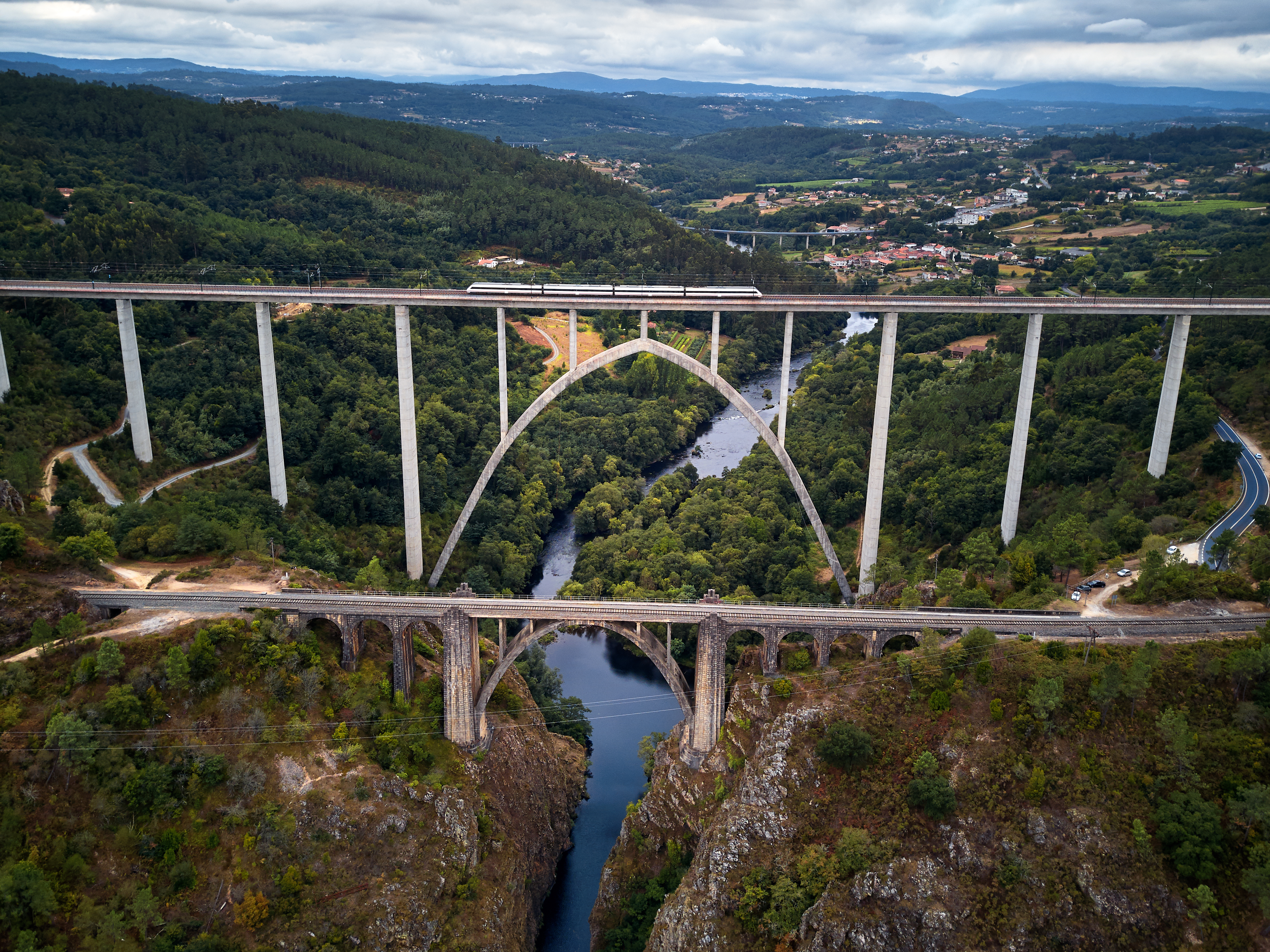
The two bridges

The new bridge, which begins just 130 metres (430 ft) from the Gundian Bridge, was built in 2008. It is a unique structure over 1 kilometre (0.62 mi) long, considered to be of architectural interest in Spain.

== Awards ==
The uniqueness of the work and the complexity and originality of its construction led the College of Civil Engineers of Galicia to award it the "San Telmo Prize" in 2011.
