= Pino del Oro =

Coordinates: 41°35′N 6°07′W

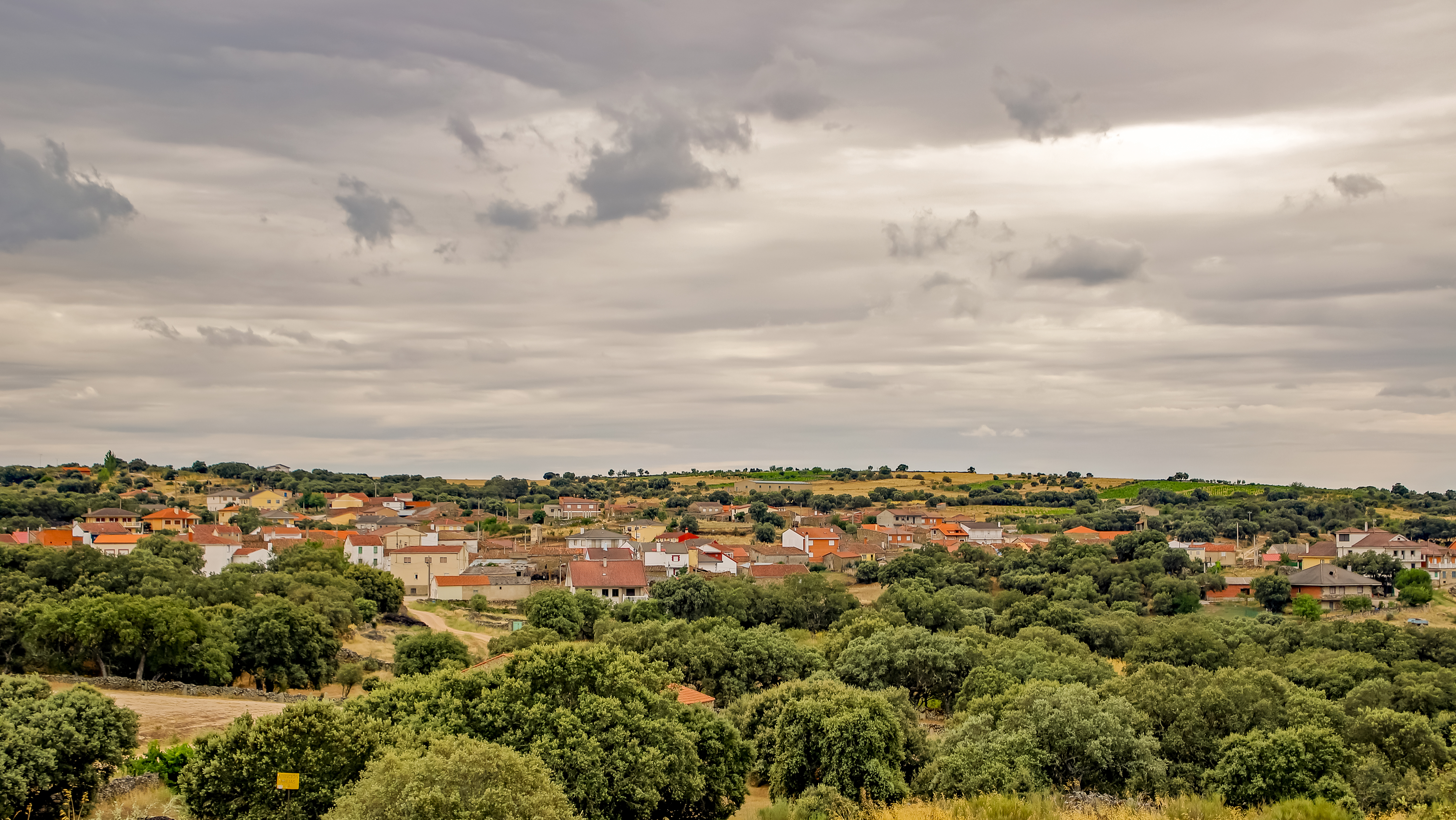

- Coat of arms
- Interactive map of Pino del Oro
- Country: Spain
- Autonomous community: Castile and León
- Province: Zamora
- Municipality: Pino del Oro

Area
  - Total: 29.57 km^{2} (11.42 sq mi)

Population (2025-01-01)
  - Total: 173
  - Density: 5.85/km^{2} (15.2/sq mi)
- Time zone: UTC+1 (CET)
  - Summer (DST): UTC+2 (CEST)

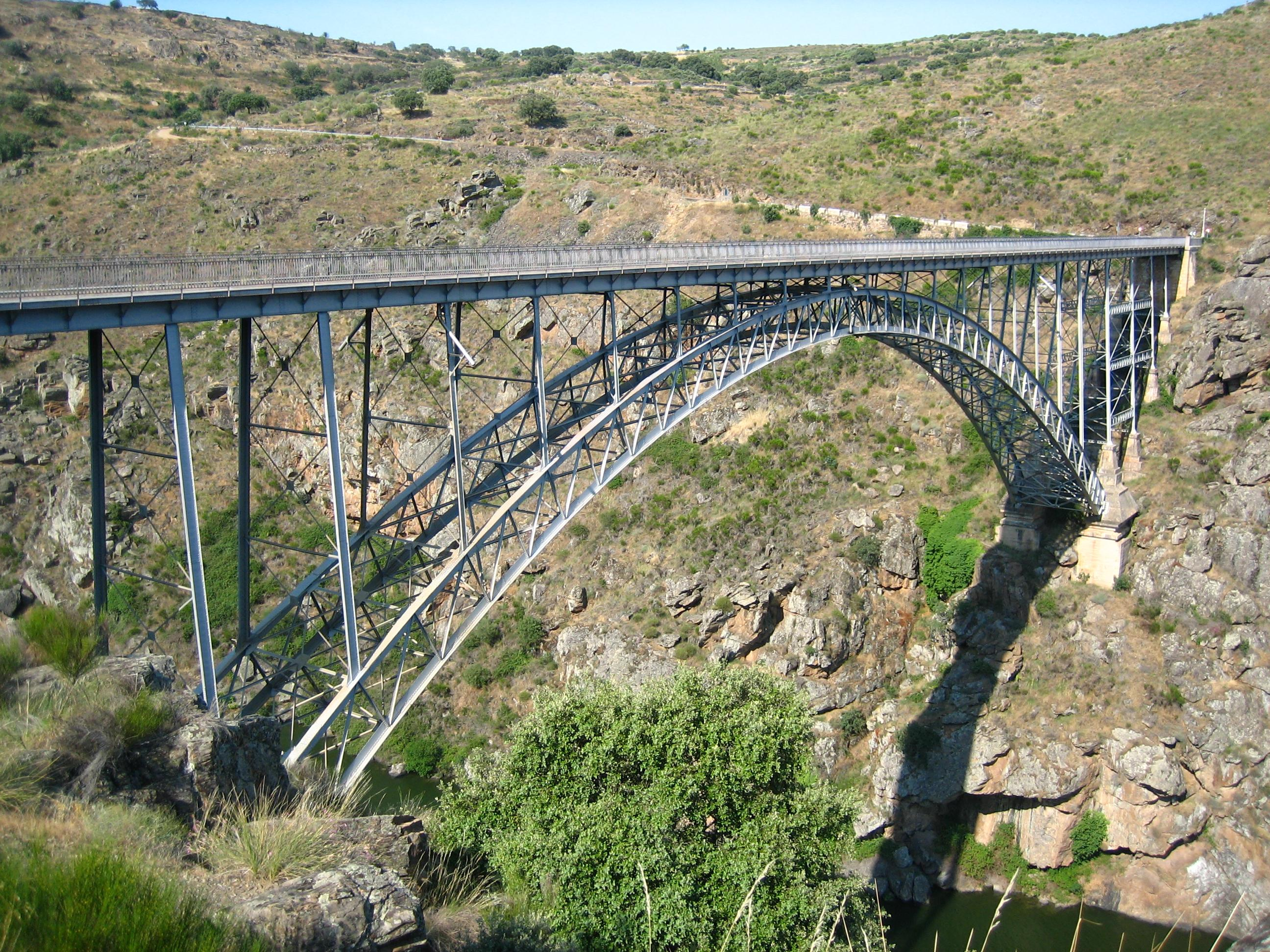
Bridge across the River Duero. It was designed by engineer Jose Eugenio Ribera

Pino del Oro, formerly known as Pino, is a Spanish municipality in the province of Zamora, Castile and León. It has a population of 203 (2006) and an area of 30 km².

A bridge links Pino del Oro and Villadepera.
