= Perilla de Castro =

Coordinates: 41°43′N 5°52′W

Perilla de Castro, Spain
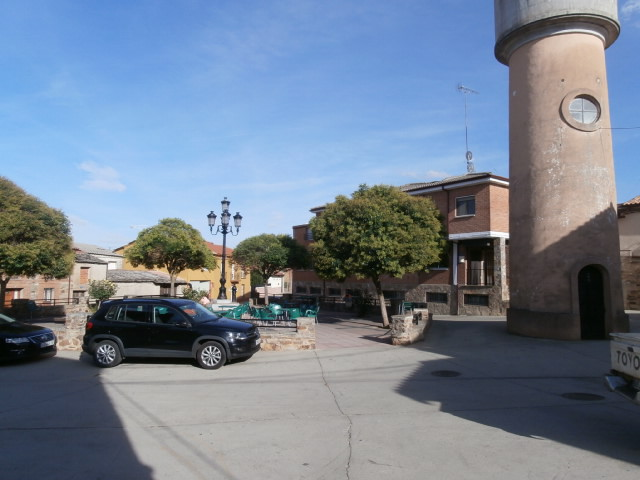
- Interactive map of Perilla de Castro, Spain
- Country: Spain
- Autonomous community: Castile and León
- Province: Zamora
- Municipality: Perilla de Castro

Area
  - Total: 33 km^{2} (13 sq mi)

Population (2025-01-01)
  - Total: 150
  - Density: 4.5/km^{2} (12/sq mi)
- Time zone: UTC+1 (CET)
  - Summer (DST): UTC+2 (CEST)

Perilla de Castro is a municipality in the province of Zamora, Castile and León, Spain. According to the 2004 census (INE), the municipality had a population of 230 inhabitants at that time.
