= Arenal Bridge (Córdoba) =

Arenal Bridge Puente del Arenal
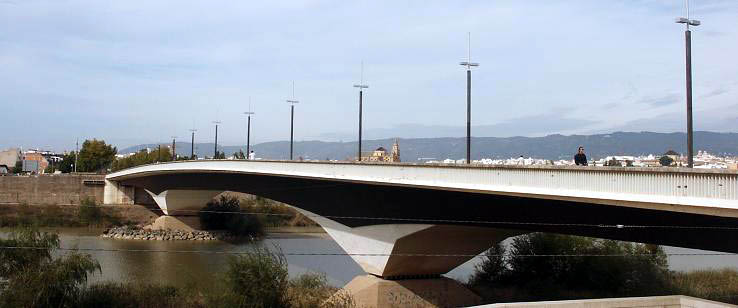
- Coordinates: 37°52′28″N 4°46′14″W
- Crosses: Guadalquivir
- Locale: Córdoba, Spain

Characteristics
- Total length: 220 m (720 ft)

History
- Built: 1992-1993

Location
- Interactive map of Arenal Bridge

The Arenal Bridge (Spanish: Puente del Arenal) is a bridge crossing the Guadalquivir River, located in Córdoba, Spain.

With its 220 meters in length and 21.5 meters in width, it connects the neighborhoods of Miraflores and Arenal.

== Incident ==
According to the report from the Scientific Police of Córdoba, the bridge fire in 2013 was deliberately set.
