= Golbardo Bridge =

Golbardo Bridge Puente de Golbardo
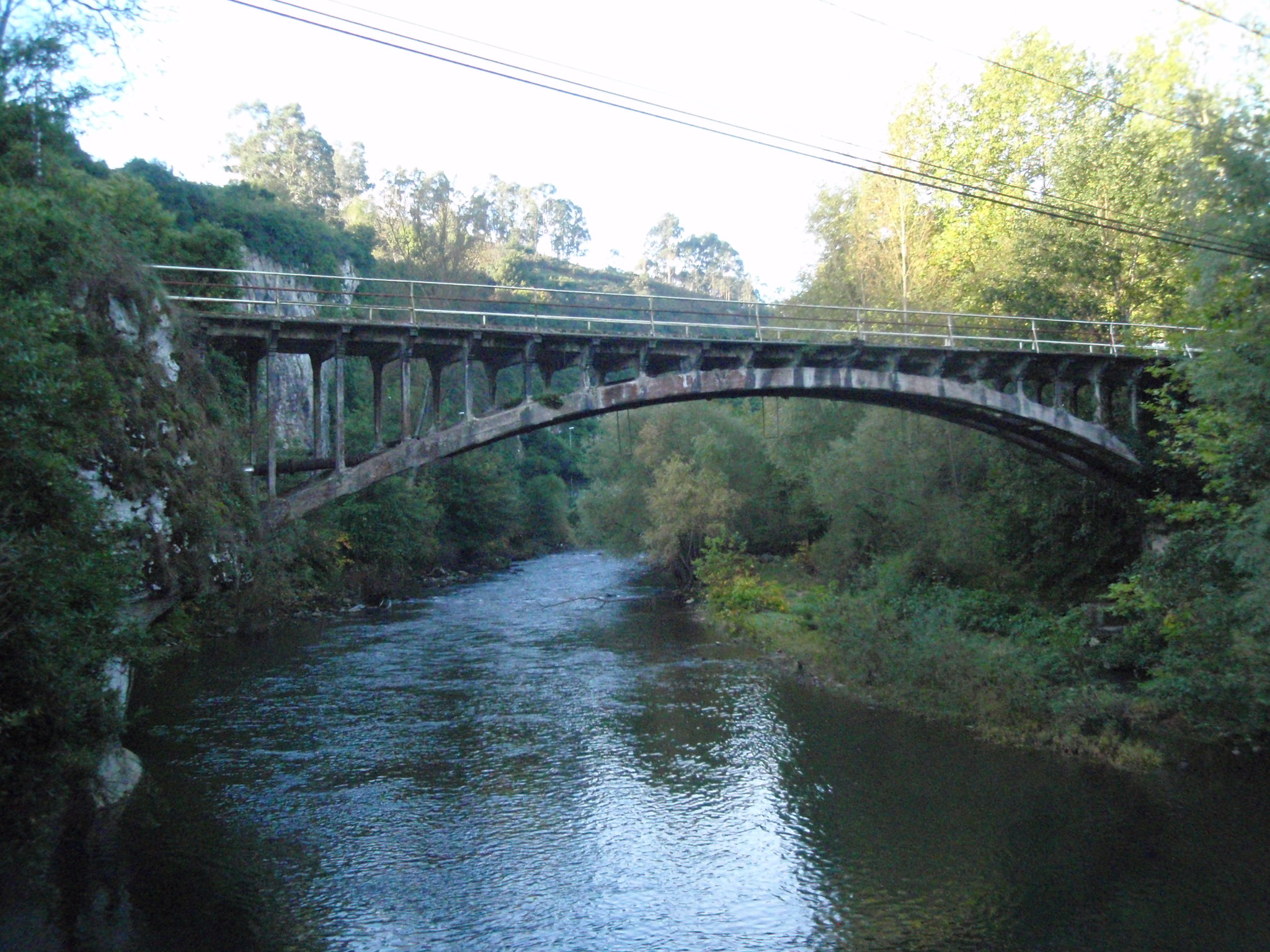
- Coordinates: 43°20′26″N 4°09′13″W
- Crosses: Saja River
- Locale: Reocín, Cantabria, Spain

Characteristics
- Design: Arch bridge
- Material: Reinforced concrete

History
- Built: 1902 - 1903

Location
- Interactive map of Golbardo Bridge

The Golbardo Bridge (Spanish: Puente de Golbardo) is an arch bridge made of concrete, declared as a Bien de Interés Cultural, which rests above the Saja river and connects the localities of Barcenaciones and Golbardo, in the city of Reocín (Cantabria, Spain).

== History ==
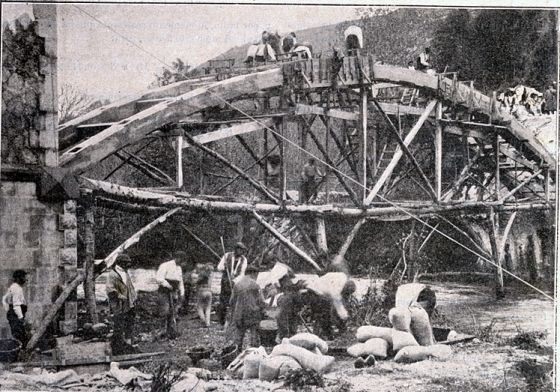
Bridge works after the arch molding is finished.

Until that time, the natural access route to the village of Golbardo was through the area known as El Tucial, also belonging to the village of Golbardo.

== Surroundings ==
Beneath the platform is a much later-built hydrometric scale that indicates the river's water level.
