= Porta d'Europa =

Bridge in Spain

Coordinates: 41°21′54″N 2°10′53″E

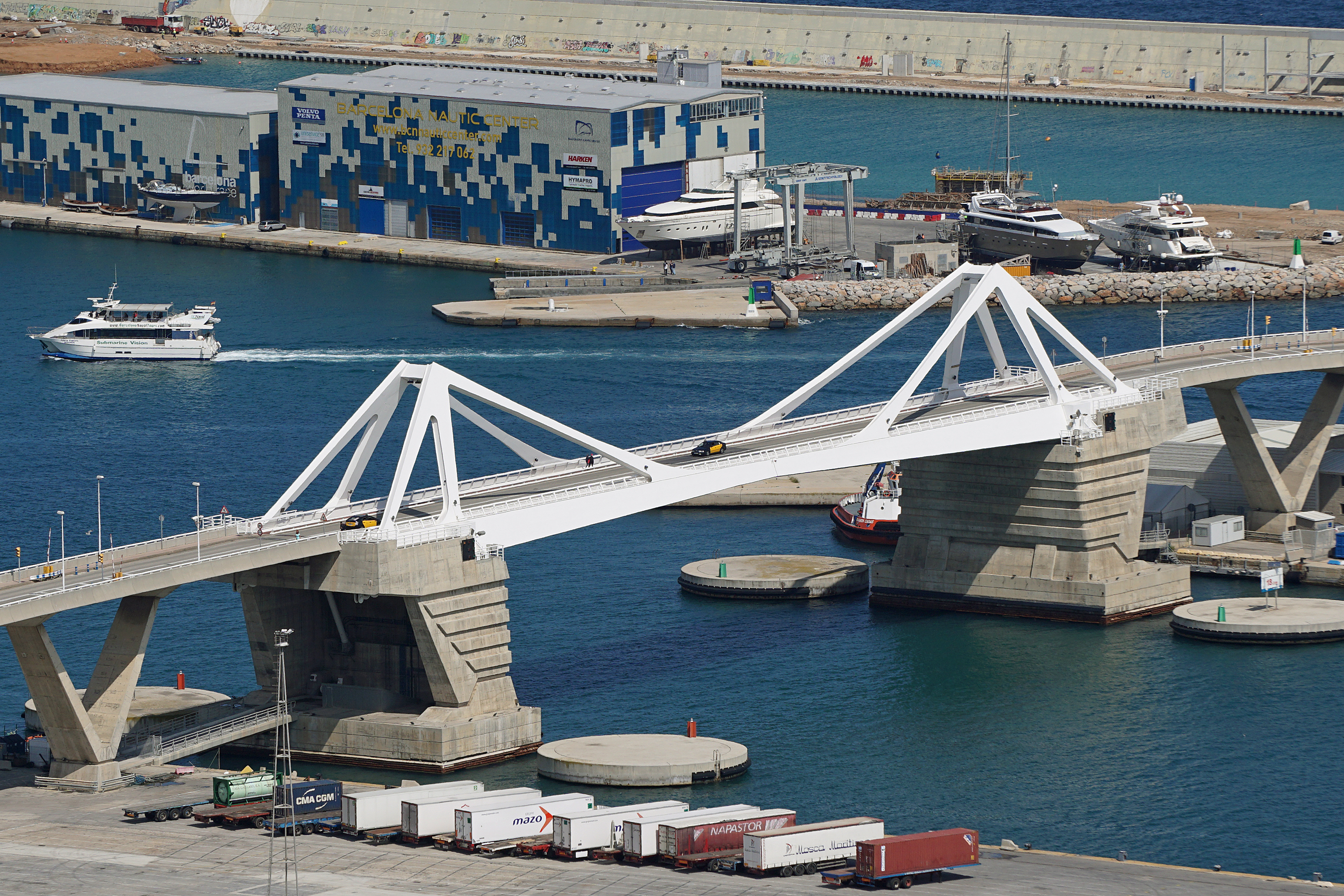
View of Porta d'Europa

Porta d'Europa is a bascule bridge in the Port of Barcelona in Barcelona, Spain. It is 106 metres (348 ft) long. It was designed by Juan José Arenas de Pablo and completed in July 2000.

== See also ==
- Sant Boi Bridge
