= Manzanal del Barco =

Coordinates: 41°38′N 5°57′W

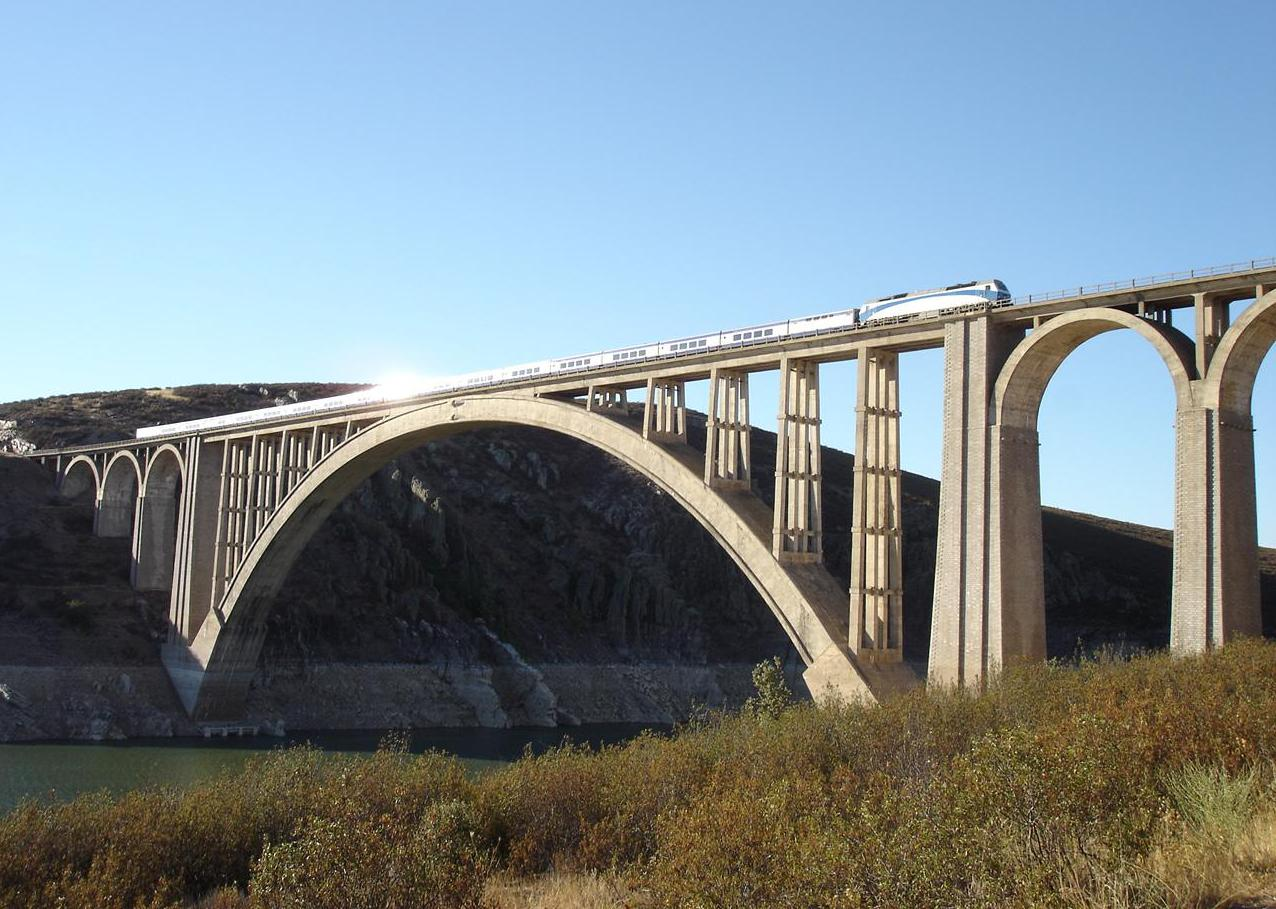

- Flag Coat of arms
- Interactive map of Manzanal del Barco
- Country: Spain
- Autonomous community: Castile and León
- Province: Zamora
- Municipality: Manzanal del Barco

Area
  - Total: 26 km^{2} (10 sq mi)

Population (2025-01-01)
  - Total: 118
  - Density: 4.5/km^{2} (12/sq mi)
- Time zone: UTC+1 (CET)
  - Summer (DST): UTC+2 (CEST)
- Website: Official website

Manzanal del Barco is a municipality located in the province of Zamora, Castile and León, Spain. According to the 2004 census (INE), the municipality has a population of 194 inhabitants.
