= Besalú Bridge =

Besalú Bridge Pont de Besalú
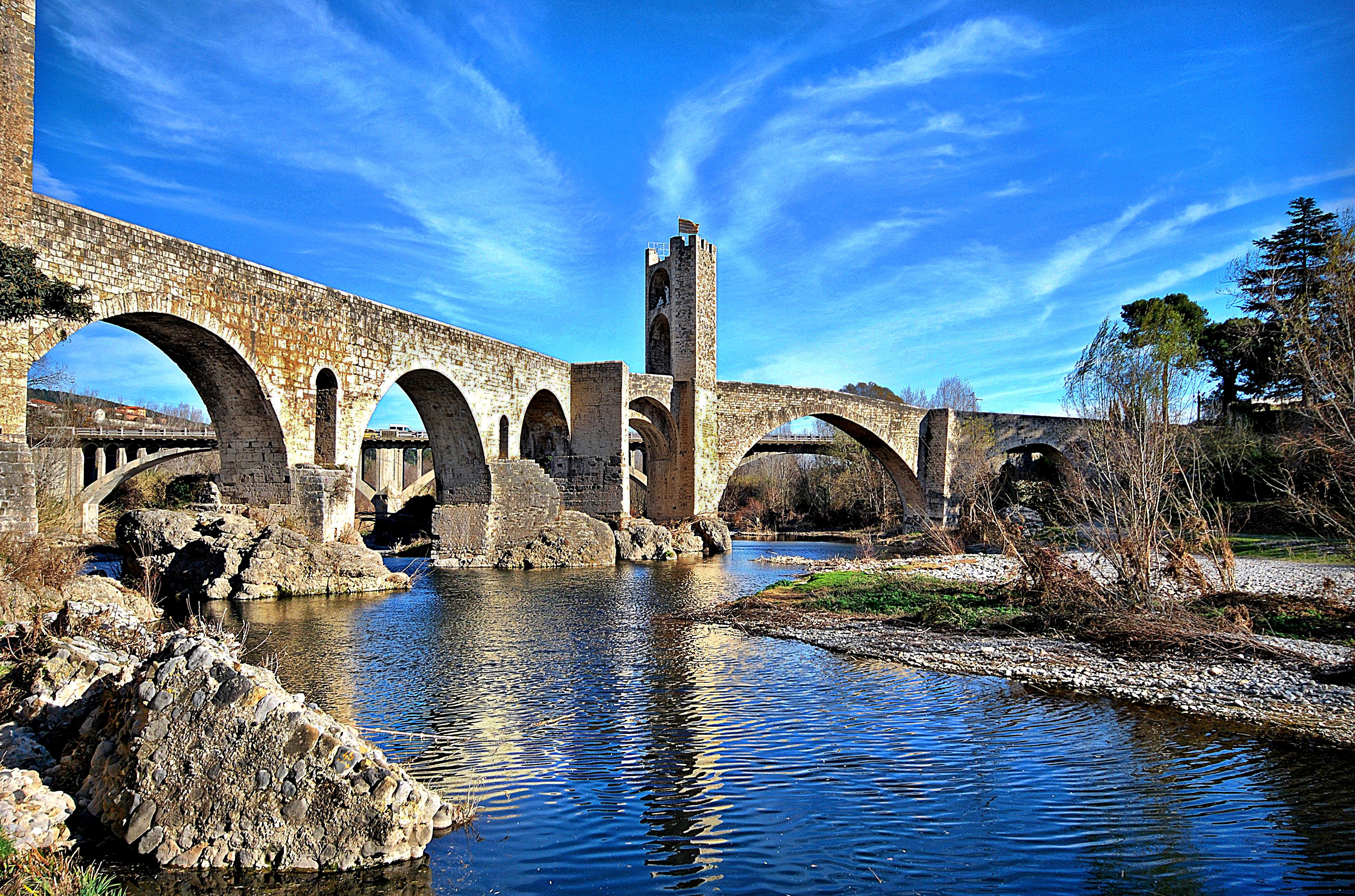
- Coordinates: 42.199361°N 2.701528°E
- Crosses: Fluvià
- Locale: Besalú, Girona Province, Catalonia, Spain

Characteristics
- Design: Arch bridge

Location
- Interactive map of Besalú Bridge

The Besalú Bridge (Spanish: Puente de Besalú) is a Romaneque bridge located in Besalú (Gerona Province, Catalonia, Spain) crossing the Fluviá river.

In 1954 it was declared a Historical-Artistic Monument, so it is deemed a Bien de Interés Cultural in the category of monuments. At the regional level, it is listed by the Generalitat de Catalunya as a "Bien Cultural de Interés Nacional."
