= Andalucía Bridge (Córdoba) =

Andalusia Bridge
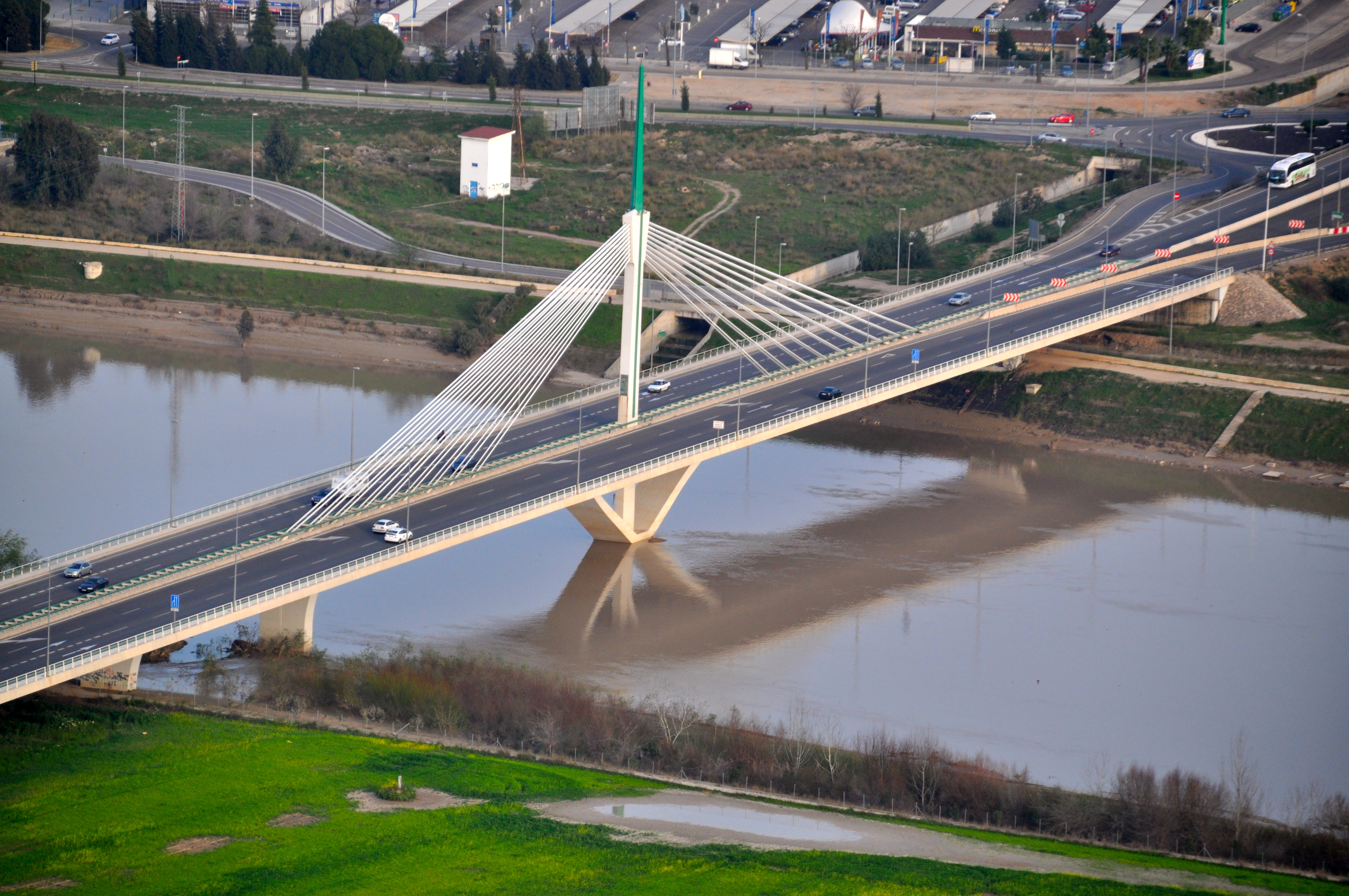
- Coordinates: 37°51′36″N 4°47′29″W
- Crosses: Guadalquivir River
- Locale: Córdoba, Spain
- Next upstream: San Rafael Bridge
- Next downstream: Abbas Ibn Firnas Bridge

Characteristics
- Material: Reinforced concrete and steel

History
- Construction cost: 10 600 000 €

The Andalusia Bridge is a cable-stayed bridge. It crosses the Guadalquivir River in Córdoba, Spain, carrying a road which connects the airport and an industrial zone. Its opening was on 28 February 2004.

== Description ==
The bridge is 210 m (689 ft) long. It is operated by the public company GIASA (Management of Infrastructures in Andalusia).

The continuous delays in completion were caused by the fact that this bridge was considered an "almost artisanal bridge" built entirely in situ and without prefabricated elements. The complexity of its construction came from the singularity of the structure itself: it is the first cable-strayed bridge designed in Spain by the prestigious engineer Javier Manterola, National Engineering Award 2001. This project was also joined by Antonio Martínez Cutillas and Javier Muñoz Rojas and build by OHL, with José Miguel Pato as an engineer in charge. Additionally Ayesa took part in this project as technical assistant and so did Carlos Fernández Casado, S.L., both under the management of Jesús Bobo, Giasa.

The bridge has an approximate flow of 40.000 vehicles a day and it is connected with the freeway A4.

== Technical characteristics ==
This bridge has a total length of 444 m (1457 ft), and a total 8 spans. The longer ones are the second from the shoreline, with a length of 114 m (374 ft) and the third of 90 m (295 ft). These spans are the ones placed over the Guadalquivir River. The transversal section is basically designed as a central coffin of prestressed concrete with three empty spaces on it of 10 m (32 ft) height and 2,5m (8,2 ft) wide, which makes a total section of almost 30m (96,8 ft) wide. In order to reach the length of the spans, the section is subjected by 9 tendons, which are anchored to the central coffin. These tendons act as a lateral tensed reinforcement for the cantilevers of the section.

The bridge is placed in a way it is connected to a circular shape of 10.000 m (32.800 ft) of a radius and then it is connected to an Euler spiral of a total length of 92,4m (303,15 ft).

The concrete used in the sections is the one with a resistance of 50Mpa, written as C50/60, according to the Eurocode-2.
