= Carretera del Norte de La Palma =

Coordinates: 28°41′15″N 17°45′35″W

- Carretera General del Norte
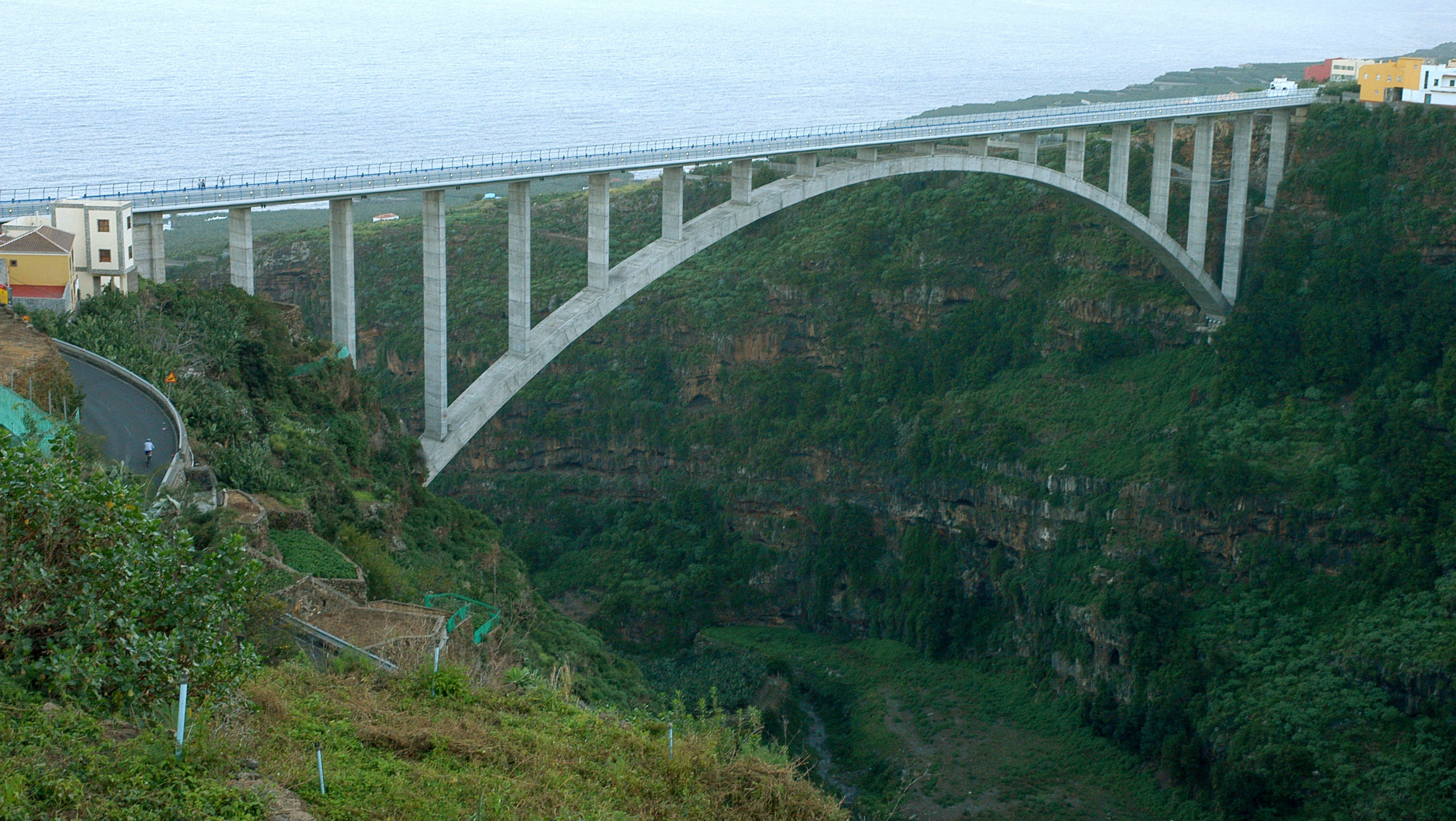
- Los Tilos Viaduct, through which the road reaches Los Sauces.

Route information
- Maintained by the Government of the Canary Islands
- Length: 102.430 km (63.647 mi)

Major junctions
- From: Port of Santa Cruz de La Palma
- To: Argual (Los Llanos de Aridane)

Location
- Country: Spain
- Autonomous community: Canary Islands
- Province: Santa Cruz de Tenerife

Highway system
- Highways in Spain; Autopistas and autovías; National Roads; Transport in the Canary Islands

Carretera del Norte de La Palma, designated as LP-1, is the main autovía (a type of highway in Spain) of the northern part of La Palma (Canary Islands, Spain) with the Santa Cruz de La Palma, its port and La Palma Airport from the east side and with the municipality of Los Llanos de Aridane on its western side. The road crosses many geographical features and various infrastructures such as bridges and tunnels, the most important being Los Tilos Viaduct.

== Remodelling ==
Thanks to the Road Agreements between the Government of Spain and the Canary Islands, the road has been improved in the Santa Cruz-Los Sauces sections and in the municipality of Garafía. Work is currently underway on the Los Sauces-Garafía section. The remodeling of the section between Garafía and Los Llanos is under study, which would include the construction of a bridge over the Las Angustias ravine, 900 m long and 300 m high.
