= San Cebrián de Castro =

Coordinates: 41°42′N 5°45′W

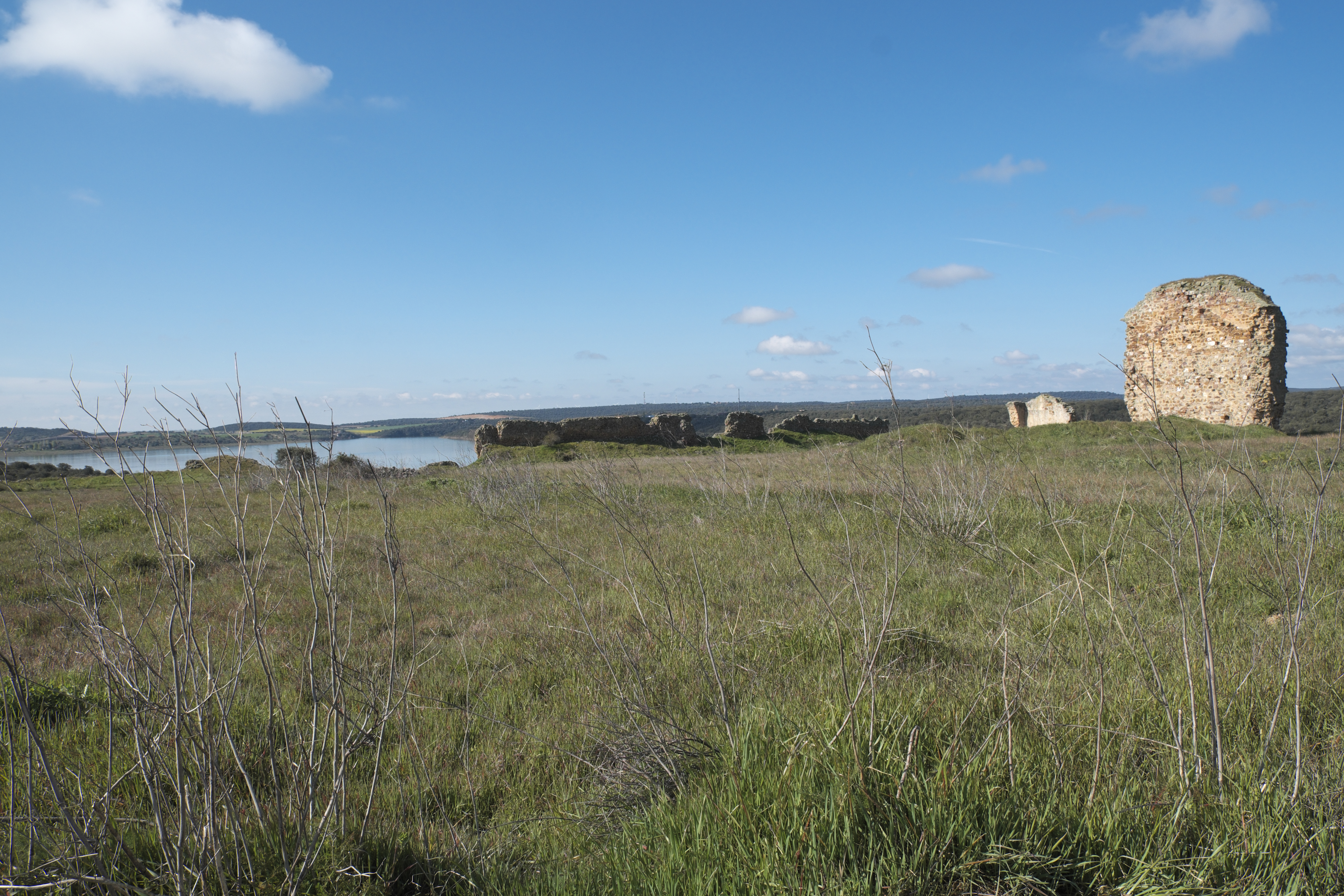

- Flag Coat of arms
- Interactive map of San Cebrián de Castro
- Country: Spain
- Autonomous community: Castile and León
- Province: Zamora
- Municipality: San Cebrián de Castro

Area
  - Total: 65 km^{2} (25 sq mi)

Population (2025-01-01)
  - Total: 250
  - Density: 3.8/km^{2} (10/sq mi)
- Time zone: UTC+1 (CET)
  - Summer (DST): UTC+2 (CEST)
- Climate: Csb

San Cebrián de Castro is a municipality located in the province of Zamora, Castile and León, Spain. According to the 2004 census (INE), the municipality has a population of 337 inhabitants.

== See also ==
- Tierra de Campos
