= Nelson Mandela Bridge (El Prat de Llobregat) =

Nelson Mandela Bridge Puente Nelson Mandela
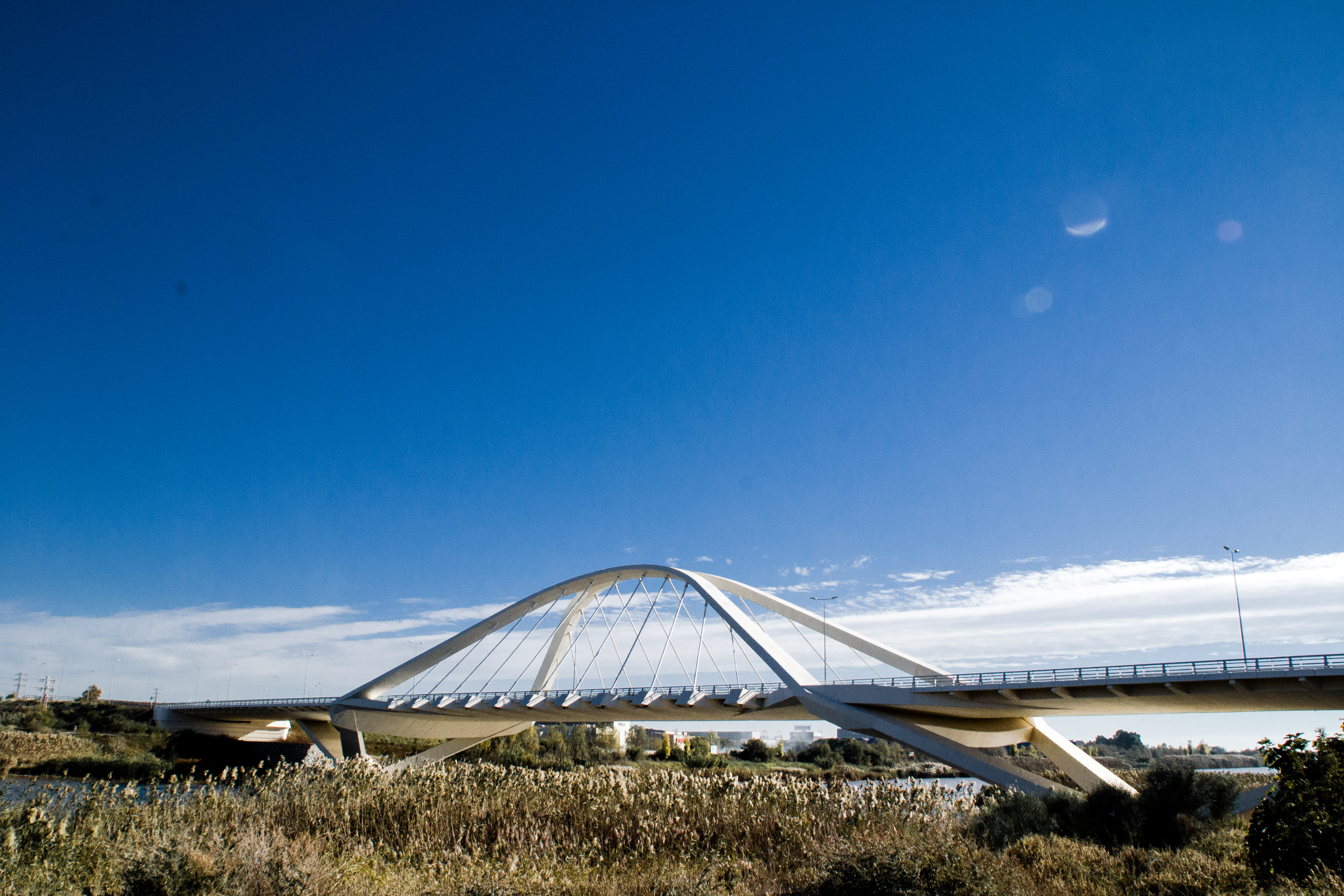
- Coordinates: 41°19′18.6″N 2°06′52.8″E
- Crosses: Llobregat
- Locale: El Prat de Llobregat, Catalonia, Spain

Characteristics
- Design: Arch bridge
- Material: Prestressed concrete

History
- Opened: April 2015

Location
- Interactive map of Nelson Mandela Bridge

The Nelson Mandela Bridge (Spanish: Puente Nelson Mandela) is a bridge in the municipality of El Prat de Llobregat (Catalonia, Spain) and is the last bridge over the Llobregat before reaching that river's mouth. It was inaugurated in April 2015 and named after South African politician Nelson Mandela on 11 February 2016. Until then it was known as the Pratenc industrial estate bridge, the Port-Airport road bridge, the Llobregat River entrance bridge or simply as the new El Prat bridge.

== Work execution ==
Evolution of the works of the Nelson Mandela Bridge in El Prat de Llobregat between 2008-2015.

The project was put out to tender by Infraestructures de la Generalitat de Catalunya in 2008 and was inaugurated in April 2015. The project cost 29 million euros.
