= Palacios del Pan =

Coordinates: 41°36′N 5°52′W

Palacios del Pan, Spain
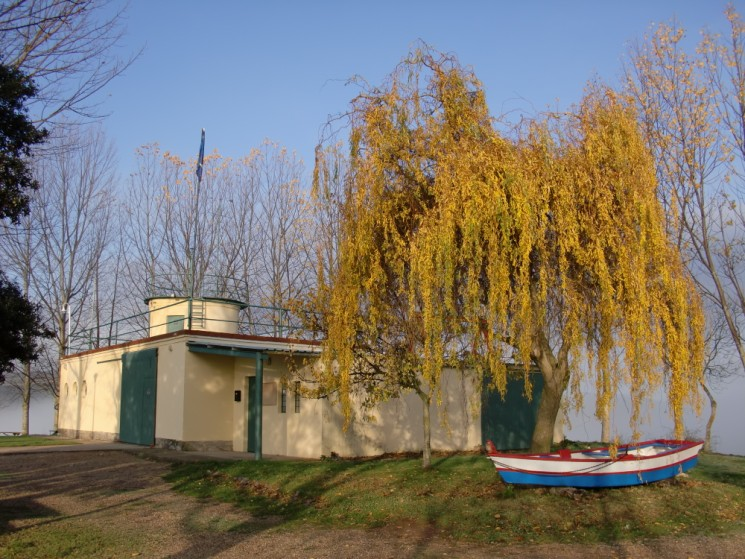
- Interactive map of Palacios del Pan, Spain
- Country: Spain
- Autonomous community: Castile and León
- Province: Zamora
- Municipality: Palacios del Pan

Area
  - Total: 31.91 km^{2} (12.32 sq mi)
- Elevation: 717 m (2,352 ft)

Population (2025-01-01)
  - Total: 249
  - Density: 7.80/km^{2} (20.2/sq mi)
- Time zone: UTC+1 (CET)
  - Summer (DST): UTC+2 (CEST)

Palacios del Pan is a municipality located in the province of Zamora, Castile and León, Spain. According to the 2004 census (INE), the municipality had a population of 235 inhabitants.
