= Águila Aqueduct =

Aqueduct in Nerja, Spain

Águila Aqueduct Acueducto del Águila
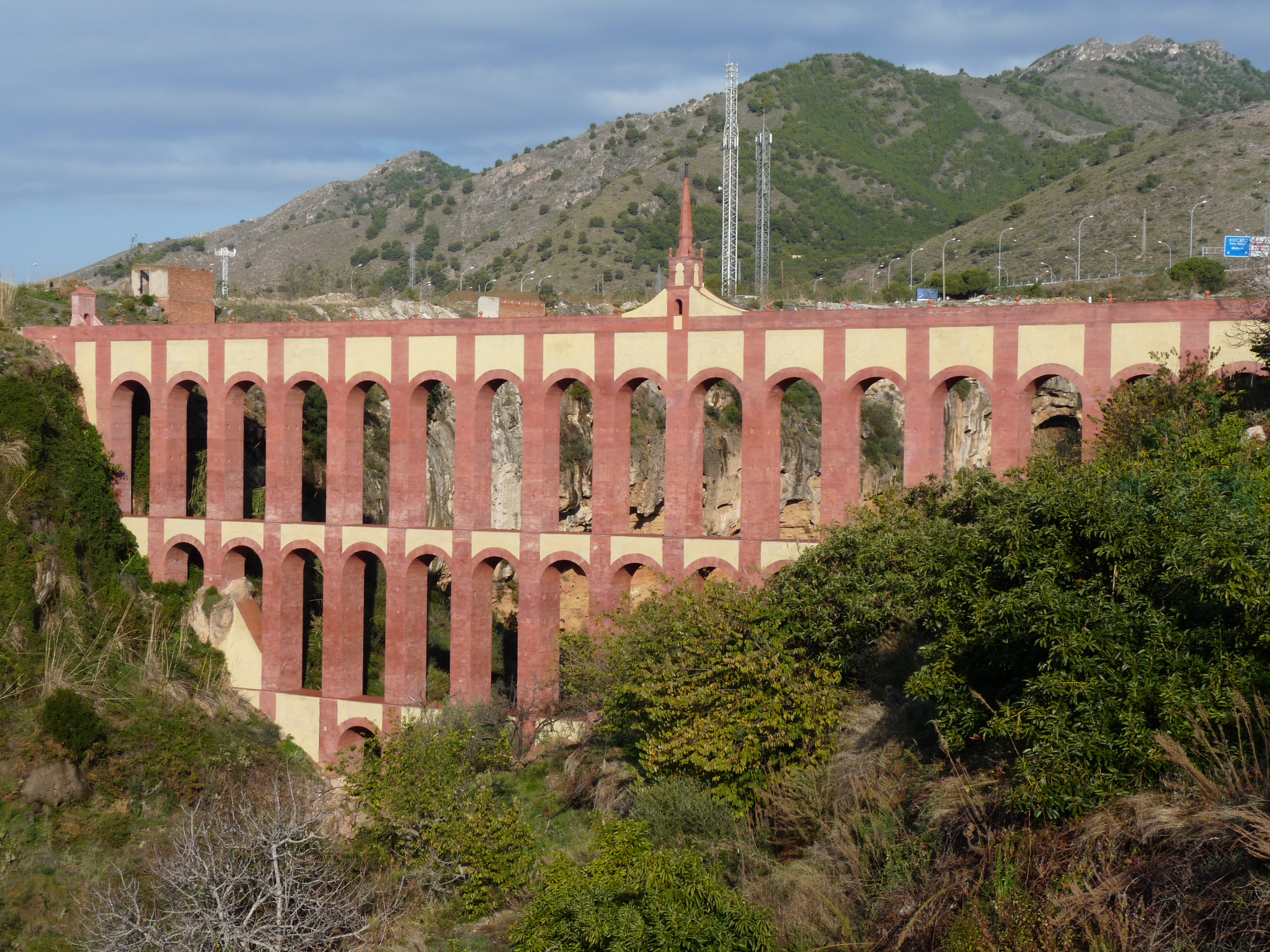
- Coordinates: 36°45′29″N 3°51′00″W
- Locale: Nerja, Province of Málaga, Spain

Characteristics
- Design: Aqueduct

Location
- Interactive map of Águila Aqueduct

The Águila Aqueduct (Spanish: Acueducto del Águila is a 19th-century civil engineering project located in the municipality of Nerja, in Andalucía (Spain).

== History ==
Restoration work began in 2010 and was completed in 2012.

== Characteristics ==
Crowning the monument is a pinnacle with a weathervane in the shape of a double-headed eagle, which gives its name to the aqueduct.
