= Piedras Albas =

Coordinates: 39.783°N 6.917°W

Piedras Albas, Spain
- municipality
- Coat of arms
- Interactive map of Piedras Albas, Spain
- Country: Spain
- Autonomous community: Extremadura
- Province: Cáceres
- Municipality: Piedras Albas

Area
  - Total: 4 km^{2} (1.5 sq mi)

Population (2025-01-01)
  - Total: 125
  - Density: 31/km^{2} (81/sq mi)
- Time zone: UTC+1 (CET)
  - Summer (DST): UTC+2 (CEST)

Piedras Albas is a municipality located in the province of Cáceres, Extremadura, Spain. According to the 2006 census (INE), the municipality has a population of 147 inhabitants.

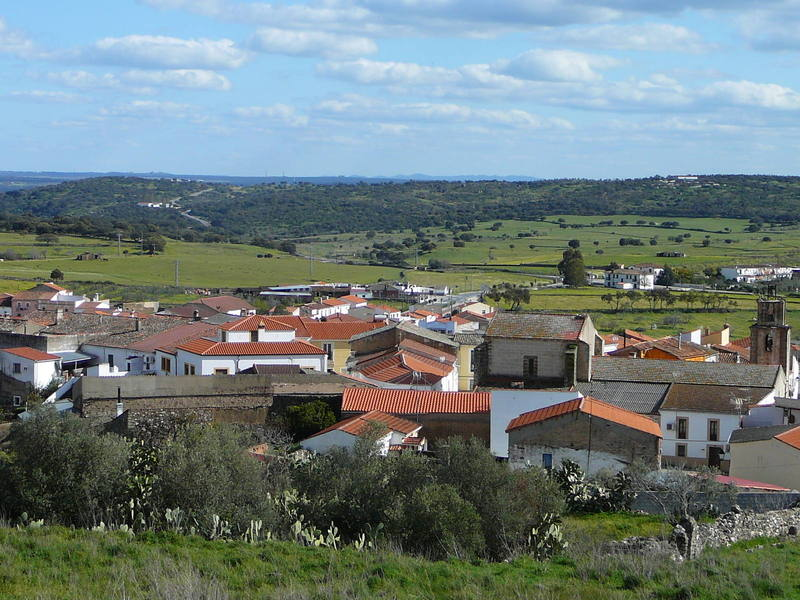
View of Piedras Albas

== See also ==
- List of municipalities in Cáceres
