= Villadepera =

Coordinates: 41°32′N 6°07′W

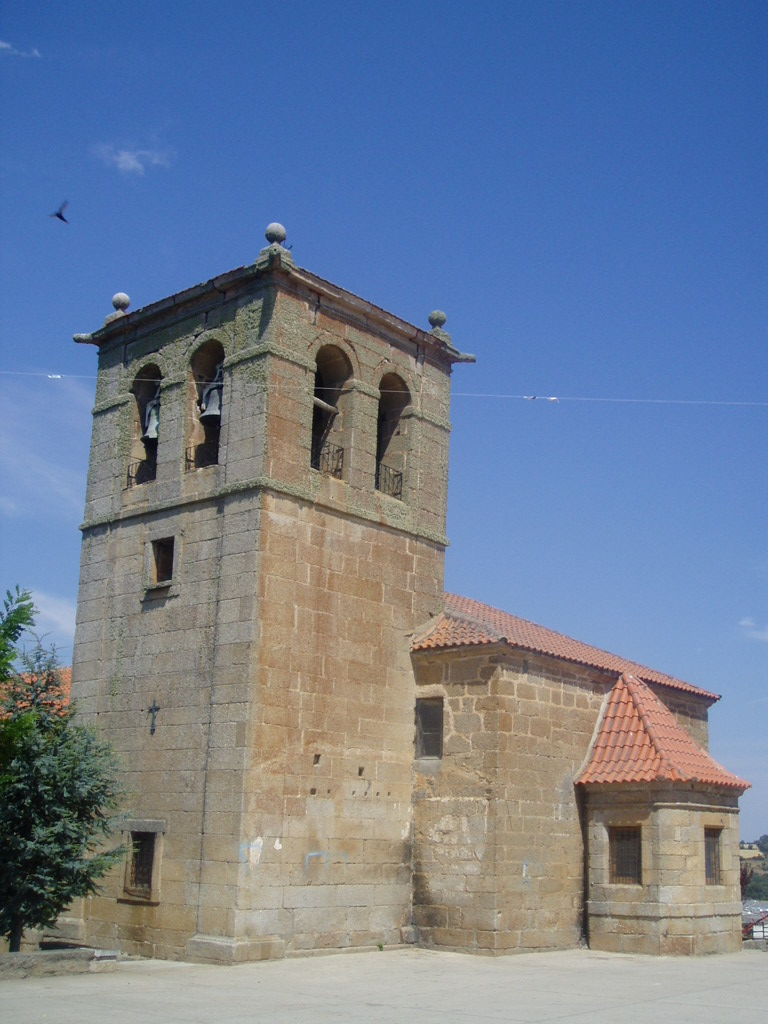

- Flag Coat of arms
- Interactive map of Villadepera
- Country: Spain
- Autonomous community: Castile and León
- Province: Zamora
- Municipality: Villadepera

Area
  - Total: 30.11 km^{2} (11.63 sq mi)

Population (2025-01-01)
  - Total: 165
  - Density: 5.48/km^{2} (14.2/sq mi)
- Time zone: UTC+1 (CET)
  - Summer (DST): UTC+2 (CEST)

Villadepera de Sayago is a rural municipality of the Spanish Zamora Province. On 1 January 2025 Villadepera had a total population of 165.

Villadepera is situated in a region where the Douro forms narrow canyons for 112 km, and that has now a protected status as the International Douro Natural Park.

== Demography ==
On January 1, 2001 Villadepera had a total population of 282.
