= Ulla (river) =

River in Spain

Ulla River
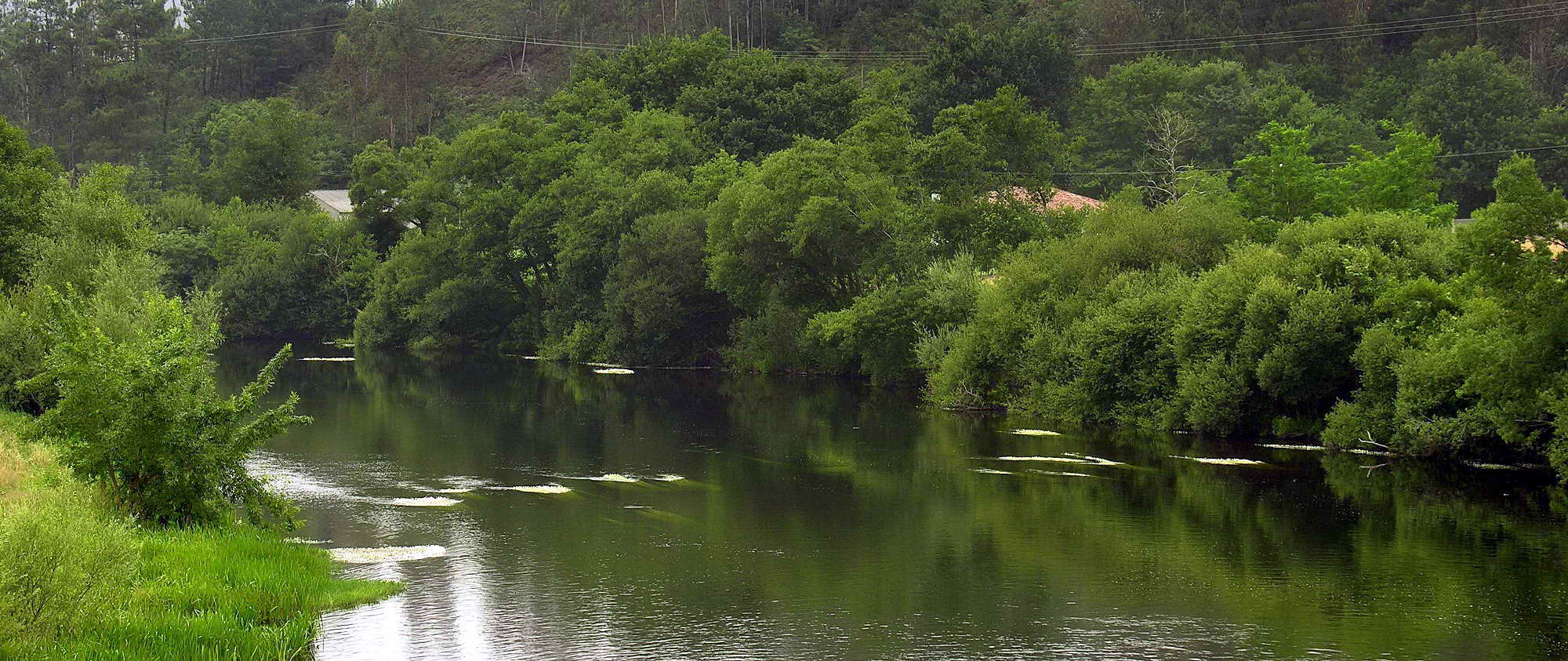
- River Ulla

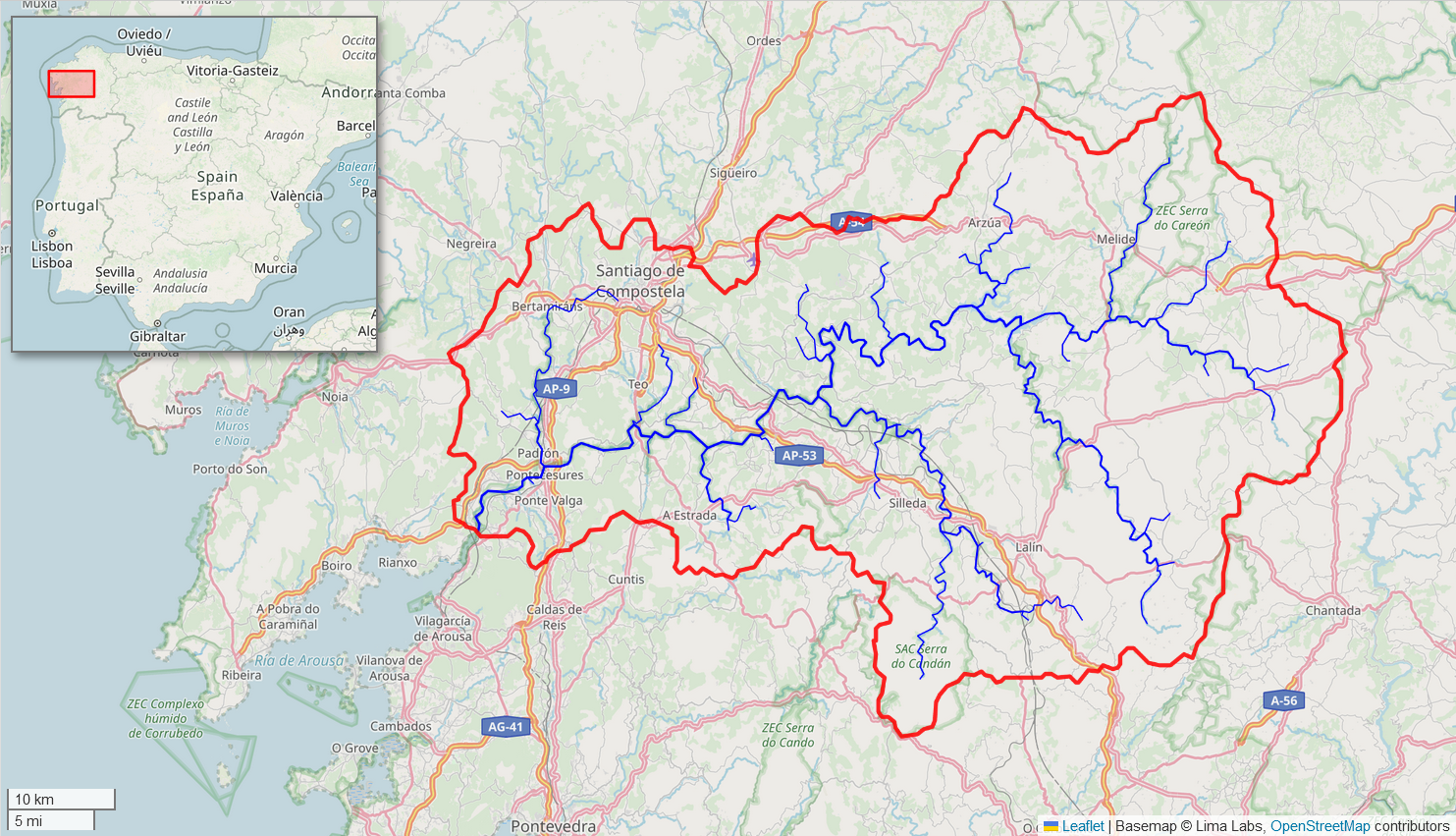
- Map of the Río Ulla river basin
- Native name: Río Ulla (Galician)

Location
- Country: Spain
- State: Galicia (Spain)

Physical characteristics
- Source
  - location: Montes da Vacaloura, Monterroso, Province of Lugo
  - coordinates: 42.745, -7.82
  - elevation: 570 m
- Mouth: Ría de Arousa estuary
  - location: near Catoira, Spain
  - coordinates: 42.67, -8.73
  - elevation: sea level
- Length: 132 km (82 mi)
- Basin size: 2,800 km^{2} (1,100 sq mi)
- Discharge
  - average: 79.3 m^{3}/s (2,800 cu ft/s)

Basin features
- Tributaries
  - left: Arnego, Deza, Liñares, Vea, Valga, Louro
  - right: Pambre, Furelos, Beseña, Iso, Lañas, Brandelos, Santa Lucía, Sar

The Ulla (río Ulla in Galician and Spanish) is a river in Galicia, Spain.

Its source is sometimes given as Antas de Ulla and sometimes the neighbouring municipality of Monterroso. It flows to the Ría de Arosa estuary near the city of Catoira. Its basin is the second largest in Galicia after the basin of Minho River. Tributaries include the rivers Deza and Arnego.

The river is valued by archaeologists owing to the large number of neolithic artefacts found there. At the outlet of the Ulla River and the mouth of the estuary, called Ría de Arousa, there are two sites where archaeologists have discovered remains including rock carvings. The Ulla River is also important because it is the river in the northwest of the Iberian Peninsula to produce a large number of watery hoards, which were discovered in its lower reaches and its mouth.

== Etymology ==
According to E. Bascuas, "Ulla" is a form belonging to the old European hydronymy, and derived from the Indoeuropean root *wel- 'wheel, rotate'. This toponym is registered in 906 as "(fluvius) Volia", which had derived from a previous form *Wulia.

== See also ==
- List of rivers of Spain
- Rivers of Galicia
