= Castilla–La Mancha =

Autonomous community of Spain

- Autonomous community
- Flag Coat of arms

- Location of Castilla–La Mancha in Spain
- Interactive map of Castilla–La Mancha
- Coordinates: 39°52′N 4°01′W
- Country: Spain
- Capital: Toledo (de facto)
- Largest city: Albacete
- Provinces: Albacete, Ciudad Real, Cuenca, Guadalajara, Toledo

Government
  - Body: Junta de Comunidades de Castilla–La Mancha
  - President: Emiliano García-Page (PSOE)
  - Executive: Council of Government
  - Legislature: Cortes of Castilla–La Mancha

Area
  - Total: 79,447.44 km^{2} (30,674.83 sq mi)
  - Rank: 3rd in Spain
- 15.7% of Spain

Population (2025)
  - Total: 2,126,378
  - Rank: 9th in Spain
  - Density: 26.76459/km^{2} (69.31996/sq mi)
- 4.3% of Spain
- Demonym: castellanomanchego/a

GDP
  - Total: €55.560 billion (2024)
  - Per capita: €26,134 (2024)
- Time zone: UTC+1 (CET)
  - Summer (DST): UTC+2 (CEST)
- ISO 3166 code: ES-CM
- Area code: +34 98-
- Statute of Autonomy: 16 August 1982
- Official languages: Spanish
- Congress: 21 deputies (out of 350)
- Senate: 23 senators (out of 265)
- HDI (2022): 0.876 very high · 16th
- Website: CastillaLaMancha.es

Castilla–La Mancha Spanish: [kasˈtiʎa la ˈmant͡ʃa]) is an autonomous community of Spain. Comprising the provinces of Albacete, Ciudad Real, Cuenca, Guadalajara and Toledo, it was created in 1982. The government headquarters are in Toledo, which is the capital de facto.

It is a landlocked region largely occupying the southern half of the Iberian Peninsula's Inner Plateau, including large parts of the catchment areas of the Tagus, the Guadiana and the Júcar, while the northeastern relief comprises the Sistema Ibérico mountain massif. Despite being the 3rd largest of Spain's autonomous communities with an area of 79,447.44 square kilometres (30,674.83 sq mi), after Castile y León and Andalusia), it is only the 9th most populous with a population of 2,126,378, and as such it is the 3rd most sparsely populated autonomous community of Spain, with Albacete, Guadalajara, Toledo, Talavera de la Reina and Ciudad Real being the largest cities.

Castilla–La Mancha is bordered by Castile and León, Madrid, Aragon, Valencia, Murcia, Andalusia, and Extremadura. Prior to its establishment as an autonomous community, its territory was part of the New Castile (Castilla la Nueva) region along with the province of Madrid, except for Albacete province, which was part of the former Murcia region.

== History ==
=== Early human history of the territory ===
Prehistory and protohistory

The Pinedo site presents material linked to the transition from earlier settlers to the Early Acheulean. Archaeological sites related to the Middle Acheulean in the current-day region lie on the Campo de Calatrava as well as in the source of the Villanueva river, the Guadiana catchment area and the Segura catchment area. The Upper Acheulean sites are mostly located within the limits of the current-day province of Ciudad Real, substantially increasing in number and territorial spread across the region for the ensuing Middle Paleolithic. The Upper Paleolithic in the region presents instances of the art of the Upper Paleolithic in the Serranía del Alto Tajo and the Upper Júcar. There are instances of Cardium pottery in Caudete from the Early Neolithic.

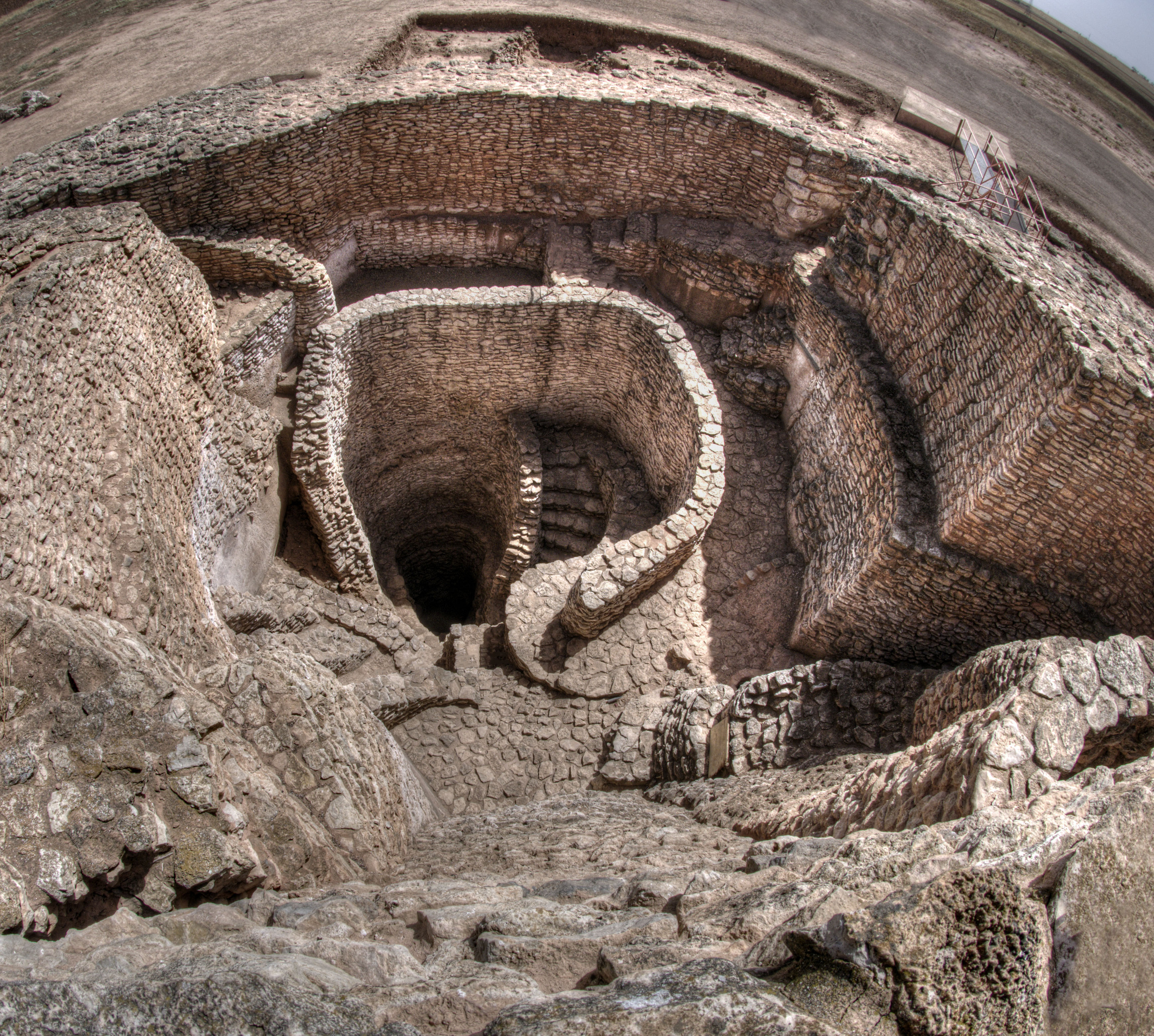
Motilla del Azuer

The natural region of La Mancha presents a number of archaeological sites related to the so-called Culture of Las Motillas of the Bronze Age, tentatively considered as the earliest reported case of human culture in Western Europe able to implement a system of underground water collection, whose installment is possibly connected to the surface water crisis caused by the 4.2 kiloyear event. A number of these Bronze Age settlements, the motillas, were built over Chalcolithic settlements.

During the Iron Age II (La Tène culture), the territory occupied by the current provinces of Ciudad Real and Albacete had a larger influence from Punic-Phoenician and Greek colonists, while the territory occupied by the current provinces of Toledo, Guadalajara and Cuenca was more influenced by the substrate of the earlier Atlantic Bronze, helping to line up the diffuse separation of two large groups of pre-Roman peoples ("Iberi" and "Celtiberi").

Iberian-related peoples dwelling the southern rim of the inner plateau such as the Oretani and Contestani were organised in tribes ruled by a kinglet or chieftain, each one controlling a number of settlements. The main cog of the Iberian form of settlement was the oppidum. From the 7th century BC onward, the Celtiberian settlements were characterised instead by the somewhat smaller castros.

Antiquity

In the 2nd century BC, by the time of the advent of the Roman conquest wars, the first actual cities had begun to grow in the inner plateau. The Roman conquest brought substantial transformations to the Carpetani urban settlements, including the social division between slaves and freemen, the monetary economy, the fostering of manufacture and trade or the new Roman acculturation.

The territory of the current region was mining-rich in Antiquity, with mentions in classical sources to the mining of cinnabar from Sisapo, silver, gold and other minerals such as selenite from Segobriga and the laminitana sharpening stone.

Middle Ages history

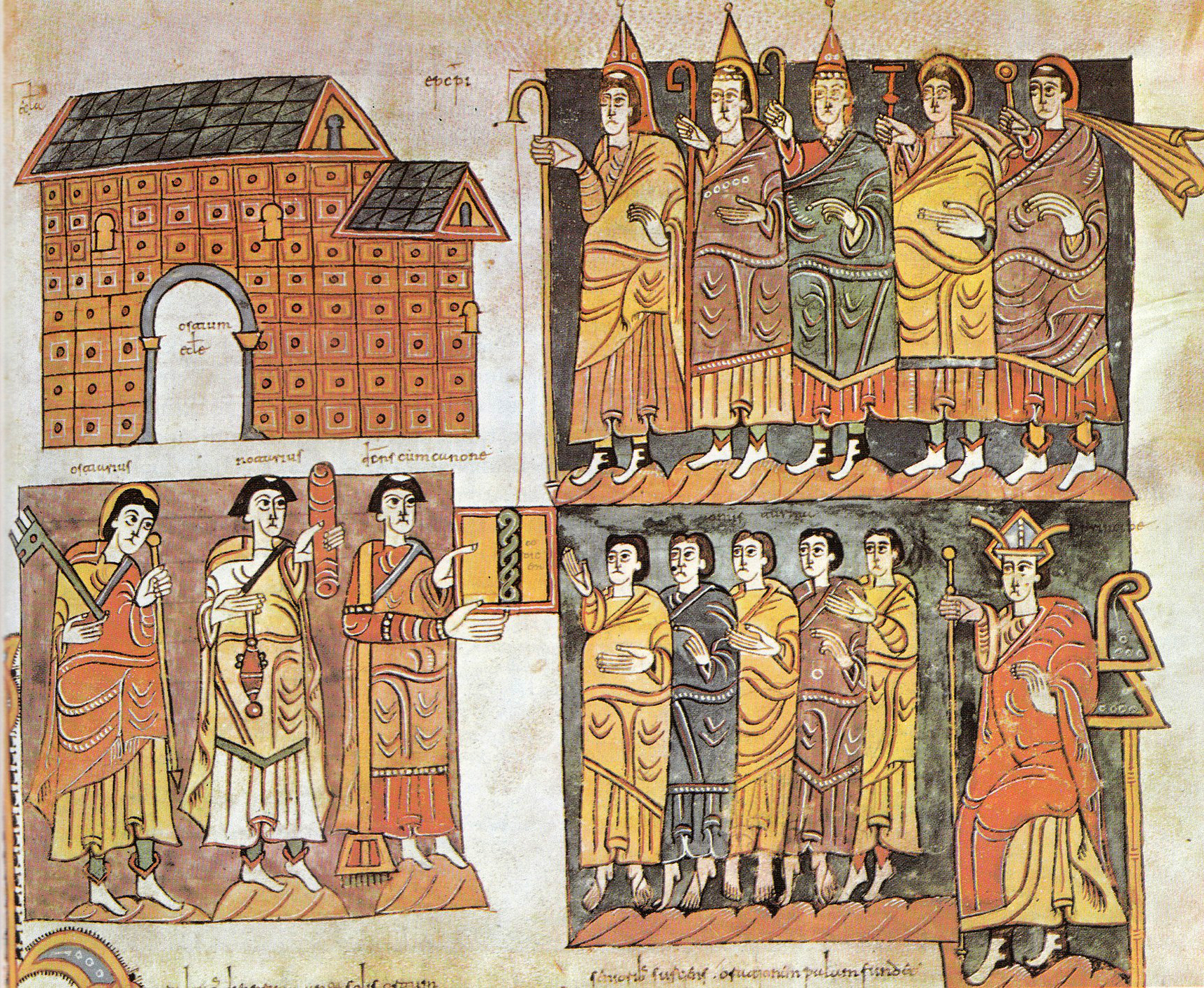
A number of nobles and clerics attending to a council in Toledo as illustrated in the 976 Codex Vigilanus

Built from scratch on state initiative, the founding of the city of Reccopolis by Visigoths in the late 6th century was a singular development in the context of the European Early Middle Ages.

Following the 8th century Muslim conquest of the Iberian Peninsula, just after the 741 Berber Revolt, the so-called Middle March of Al-Andalus (al-Ťāğr al-Awsat) was created as territorial sub-division, existing for the rest of the ensuing emiral and caliphal period of Al-Andalus. During this era, the Middle March had eminently a military nature, both shielding the core of Al-Andalus from the raids of the Northern Christian polities as well as serving as staging ground for Muslim offensive campaigns against the former. Berber clans such as the Masmuda Banu-Salim (linked to the founders of Guadalajara) or the Hawwara Banu Zennun (based in the Kura of Santover) had an important role in the Muslim settlement of parts of the Middle March. The city of Toledo stood distinctly unruly towards the Cordobese authorities, and remained a major city of al-Andalus, preserving quite of its former importance and hosting a leading cultural centre that lasted even after the Christian conquest.

As consequence of the fitna of al-Andalus in the early 11th century, an independent polity with its center in Toledo (the Taifa of Toledo), emerged, roughly occupying the territory of the current-day provinces of Toledo, Ciudad Real, Guadalajara and Cuenca (as well as that of Madrid),

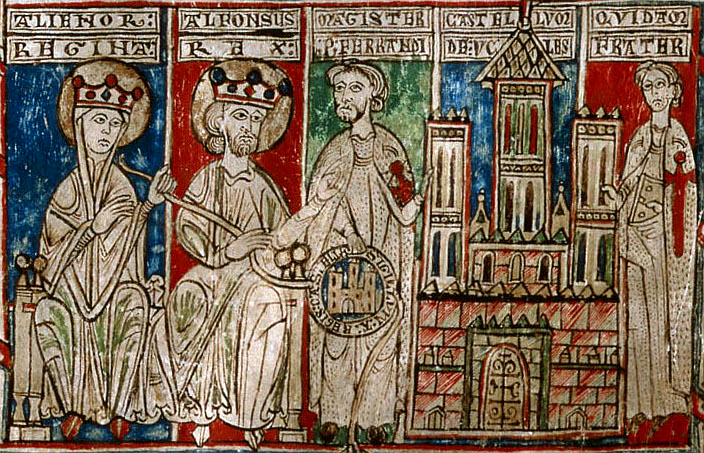
Delivery of the fortress of Uclés to the Master of the Order of Santiago in 1174

Following the Christian conquest of Toledo in 1085, the ensuing unsuccessful attempts by North-African Almoravids and Almohads to take the city turned the territory of the inner plateau south of the Tagus subject to extreme warfare for about a century and a half. The military insecurity south of the Tagus constrained the colonisation process undertaken by the new Castilian rulers. This underpinned the features of a sparse population in the region; as a result, ranching became a mainstay of the economy, which later led to the leading role of the military orders. The latter controlled over 20,000 km^{2} in the region of "La Mancha", managed from just 25 castles. The weak Christian grip over the territory collapsed after their crushing defeat from the Almohads in Alarcos (1195). Christian control south of the Tagus would only start to consolidate after the 1212 battle of Las Navas. The weak settlement and insecurity also allowed for countryside banditry (the so-called golfines) in the area of the Montes de Toledo until its progressive quelling, already effective by the late 13th century. By that time, rural beekeepers self-organised to repel the predatory practices in the monte by the golfines, whose presence in the Montes de Toledo was further obliterated by the creation of the so-called hermandades viejas by councils at Toledo, Talavera or Villa Real in the dawn of the 14th century.

Despite a poorly representative degree of permeability, urban oligarchies in the current-day region during the Late Middle Ages were largely perpetuated by means of lineage, through inheritance and marriage. Following the ascension of the Trastámaras, the territory of the current-day province of Toledo underwent a process of seigneuralization, and a number of non-religious lordships were progressively created in the area. The 15th century also brought a growing importance of the political elites belonging to towns of the southern meseta in the affairs of the Crown of Castile relative to the prior uncontested preponderance of those elites from towns north of the Sistema Central.

Modern history

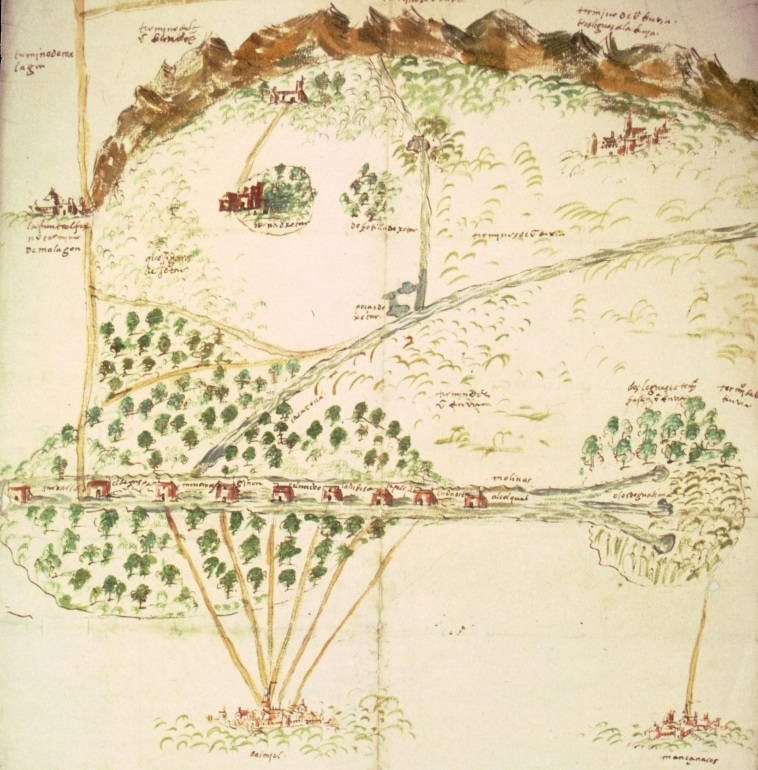
16th-century map showing the watermills in the Guadiana, a historically major grain milling centre in La Mancha

Throughout the 18th century, following the War of Spanish Succession, the Spanish Bourbon monarchs sought to equilibrate the commercial balance with the exterior carrying out an economic policy that tried to foster industrial capacity through economic interventionism. The State shall either stimulate the capacity of private capital or simply provide the capital itself. Examples of royal manufactures created in the 18th century included the Real Fábrica de Paños in Guadalajara, the Real Fábrica de Sedas in Talavera de la Reina, or the Real Fábrica de Paños in Brihuega.

The current provincial configuration roughly dates from the 1833 division by Javier de Burgos, establishing the outline of the modern provinces of Albacete, Ciudad Real, Cuenca, Guadalajara and Toledo, bar relatively minor later adjustments. Albacete was part, together with Murcia of a wider region, whereas Ciudad Real, Cuenca, Guadalajara, and Toledo formed a region together with the Province of Madrid, "New Castile". The justice administration stood in between the national and provincial levels of government (also unaligned with the purported regional classification insofar Albacete is concerned), with the audiencia of Albacete managing the provinces of Albacete, Cuenca and Ciudad Real, and the audiencia of Madrid managing the provinces of Toledo and Guadalajara (and that of Madrid).

The aforementioned modifications to the 1833 division include the party of Villena (lost by Albacete to Alicante in 1836), Requena (lost by Cuenca to Valencia in 1851), Villarrobledo (lost by Ciudad Real to Albacete c. 1846) or Valdeavero (lost by Guadalajara to Madrid in 1850). The provincial government institution was the provincial deputation.

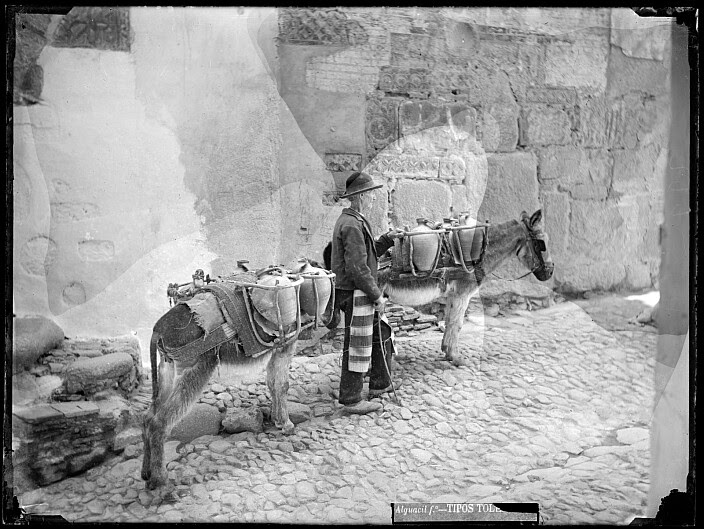
A water carrier c. 1900, by Casiano Alguacil

The agrarian capitalism favoured by the bourgeoisie in the 19th century enshrined an economy based on cereal commodities and the primary sector, favouring the leveling of the reduced industrial activity—chiefly textile—in the territory corresponding to the current-day region, whereas mining output—with sites such of the mercury deposits in Almadén or the coal deposits in Puertollano—remained below potential. A silver rush broke out in the mining district around Hiendelaencina after 1844. Large-scale mining of lead and zinc in San Quintín (province of Ciudad Real) ensued in between 1884 and 1934. The arrival of railway transport in the mid 19th-century subordinated the interests of the provinces to those of Madrid and the Levante, although it fostered the development of some urban centres such as those of Alcázar de San Juan, Manzanares and Albacete. The five provinces lost relative demographic weight relative to the national total over the course of the century.

The territory of the current-day region was singularly affected by the desamortizaciones, particularly those of Mendizábal and Madoz. From 1836 to 1924 1,600,000 hectares (4,000,000 acres) of land were auctioned (1,100,000 hectares of municipal properties and the rest church's property). They were purchased by the political and economic elites of the country.

Seeking to curb immigration to the Spanish capital, the so-called Madrid Decongestion Plan of 1959 created planned industrial estates in Alcázar de San Juan, Manzanares, Guadalajara, and Toledo. The plan did not yield the expected results as Madrid kept growing and the industrial zones eventually stagnated.

=== Regionhood ===
Under the auspices of the 1978 Constitution, a decree-law was issued on 15 November 1978, establishing the conditions of the "pre-autonomous regime" of the "Castilian-Manchegan region". A joint assembly of legislators and provincial deputies of the provinces of Albacete, Ciudad Real, Cuenca, Guadalajara, Toledo was established in Manzanares in 1981 to draft the early sketch of the regional statute. On 17 June 1982, the Congress of Deputies approved the final text of the regional statute (an organic law), which was later published on 16 August 1982, giving birth to the autonomous community of "Castilla-La Mancha". (Note: A historical precedent for the denomination of Castilla–La Mancha, unbeknownst to the creators of the autonomous community, is the denomination of "Castilla–Mancha" for a region with capital in Toledo featured in a 1842 proposal of territorial organization of Spain devised by Federal Republicanist author Wenceslao Ayguals de Izco.) The constituent process of the autonomous community was sealed with the election of the first regional legislature in May 1983 and the ensuing investiture of José Bono as regional president. By December 1983 still less than half of citizens actually knew the autonomous community they belonged to.

Since its opening in 1979 the Tagus-Segura Water Transfer has caused a severe social-economic impact on the region, with the water resources available in the Tagus headwaters decreasing by about a 47.5% after 1980.

== Geography ==
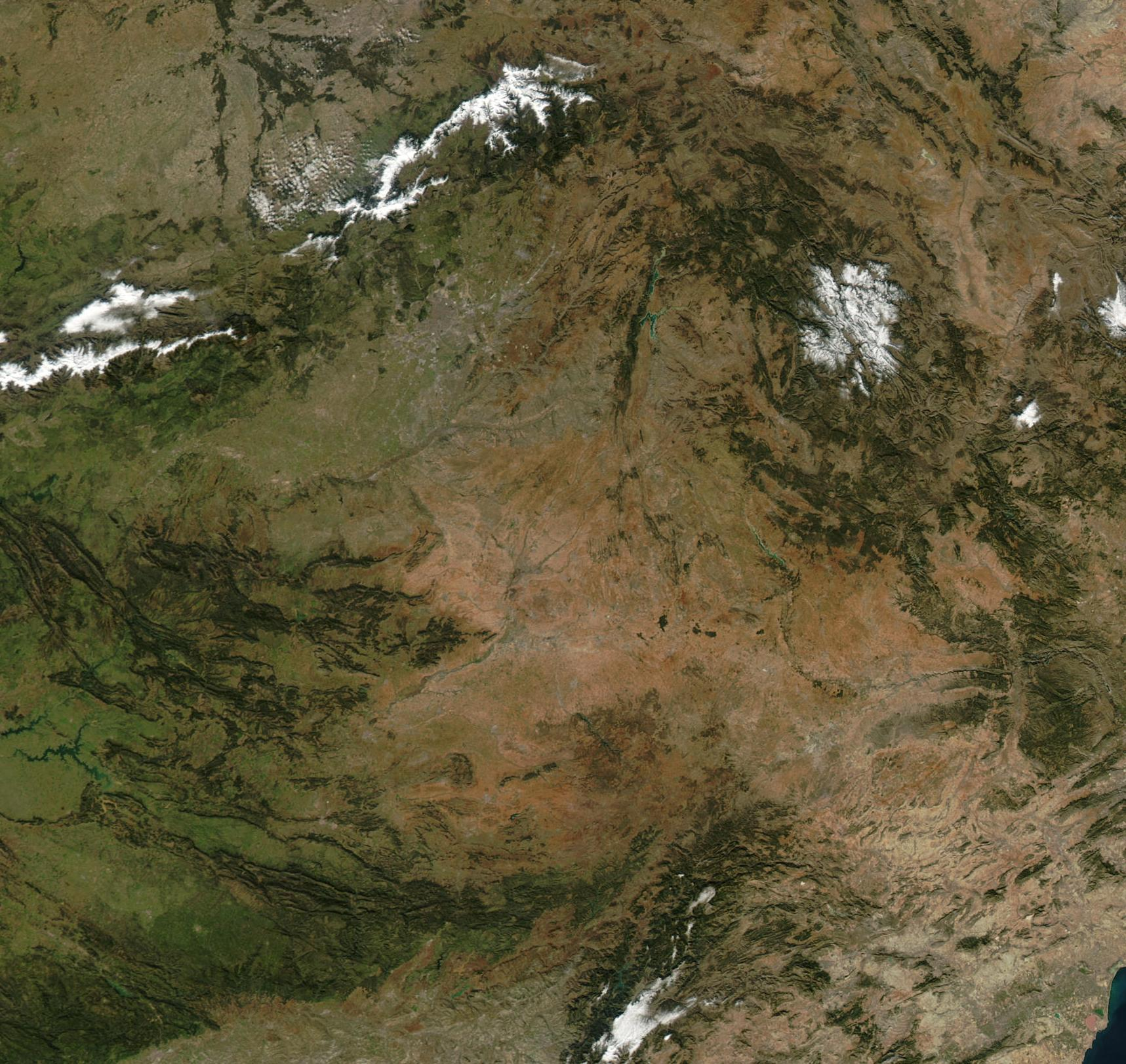
Satellite image of Castilla–La Mancha

Castilla–La Mancha is located in the middle of the Iberian Peninsula, occupying the greater part of the Submeseta Sur, the vast plain composing the southern part of the Meseta Central and La Mancha. The Submeseta Sur (and the autonomous community) is separated from the Submeseta Norte (and the community of Castilla y León) by the mountain range known as the Sistema Central. Despite this, the region has no shortage of mountain landscapes: the southern slopes of the aforementioned Sistema Central in the north, the Sistema Ibérico in the northeast, and the Sierra Morena and Montes de Toledo in the south.

Castilla–La Mancha is the third largest of Spain's autonomous regions, with a surface area of 79,463 square kilometres (30,681 sq mi), representing 15.7 percent of Spain's national territory.

The regional urban structure is polycentric, with no dominant central city. Insofar the largest municipality (Albacete) is located in the peripheral southeast, Madrid (outside the region), exerts influence over the extension of the so-called Corredor del Henares into the province of Guadalajara (including the provincial capital) as well as the north of the province of Toledo. The rest of urban centres lie on the central plains (with for example, the presence of intermediate agro-cities in La Mancha), contrasting with the sparsely populated mountains and other peripheral areas.

=== Relief ===
The Meseta is the dominant landscape unit of a great part of the territory of Castilla–La Mancha: a vast, uniform plain with little relief.

The west-to-east Montes de Toledo range cuts across the meseta separating the (northern) Tagus and the (southern) Guadiana drainage basins. The most outstanding peaks of this modest mountain range include La Villuerca (1,601 meters (5,253 ft)) and Rocigalgo (1,447 meters (4,747 ft)).

In contrast, a more mountainous zone surrounds the Meseta and serves as the region's natural border. In the north of the Province of Guadalajara, bordering Madrid and Segovia, is a mountain range forming part of the Sistema Central, among which can be distinguished the mountain ranges Pela, Ayllón, Somosierra, Barahona and Ministra, with the headwaters of the rivers Jarama, Cañamares and Henares. The Sistema Central also penetrates the northwest of the province of Toledo: a southwest to northeast sub-range known as the Sierra de San Vicente, bordered on the north by the Tiétar and on the south by the Alberche and the Tagus, rising up to its maximum heights at the summits of Cruces (1373 m), Pelados (1331 m) and San Vicente (1321 m).

On the northwest is the Sistema Ibérico, where there is important fluvial and especially karstic activity, which has given rise to such landscapes as the Ciudad Encantada, the Callejones de Las Majadas and the Hoces del Cabriel.

In the southeast is the ridge of the Sierra Morena, the southern border of the Meseta Central and the region's border with Andalusia. Within the Sierra Morena, distinction can be made between the Sierra Madrona, Sierra de Alcudia and Sierra de San Andrés. At the other southern extreme of Castilla–La Mancha, the Sierra de Alcaraz and Sierra del Segura form part of the Sistema Bético.

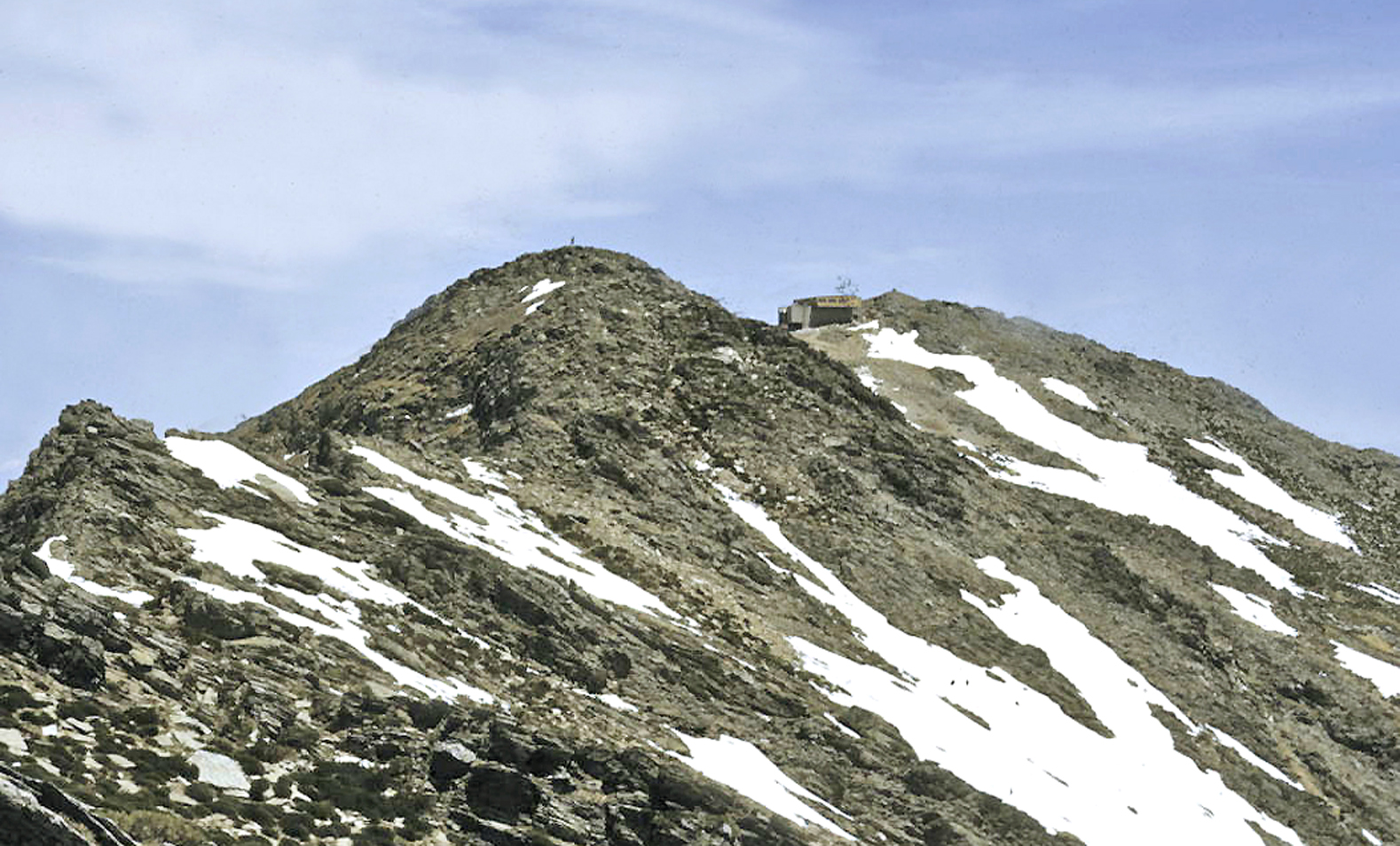
The Pico del Cervunal (foreground) and the Pico del Lobo (background) in El Cardoso de la Sierra. The Pico del Lobo stands as the tallest summit in the region at 2,273 metres above mean sea level.

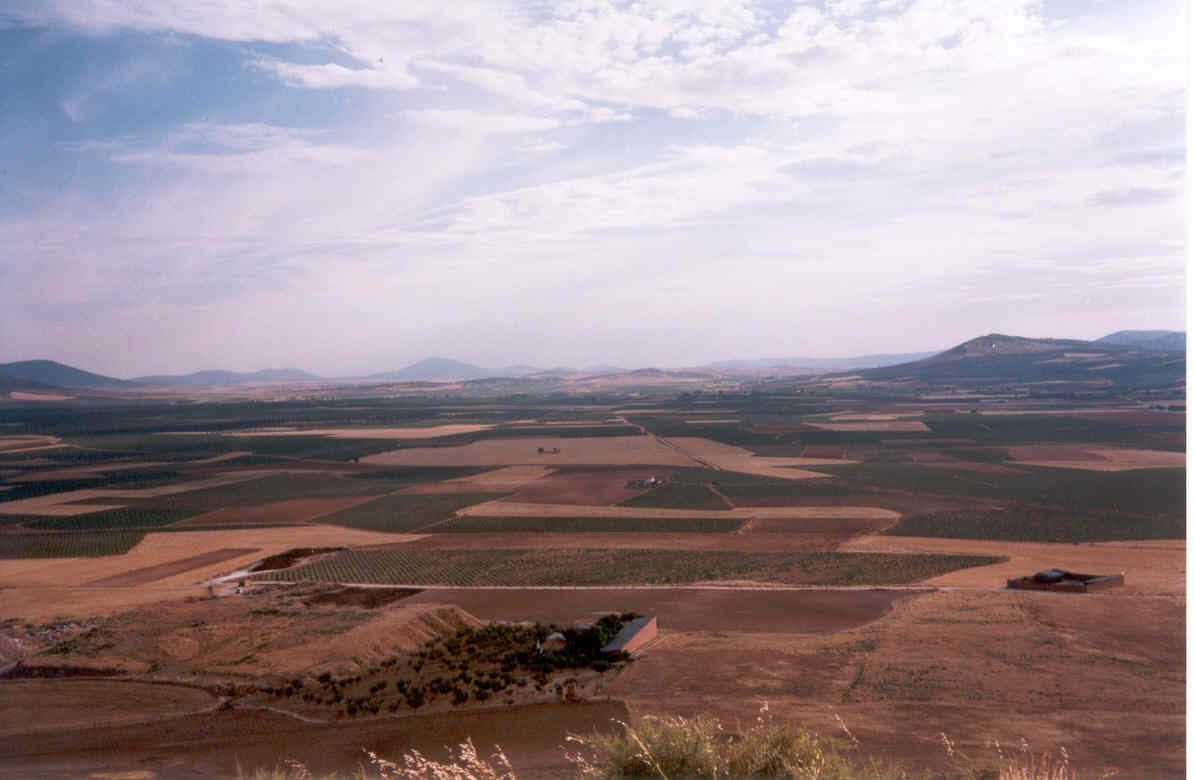
The meseta sur plateau in Consuegra, Toledo

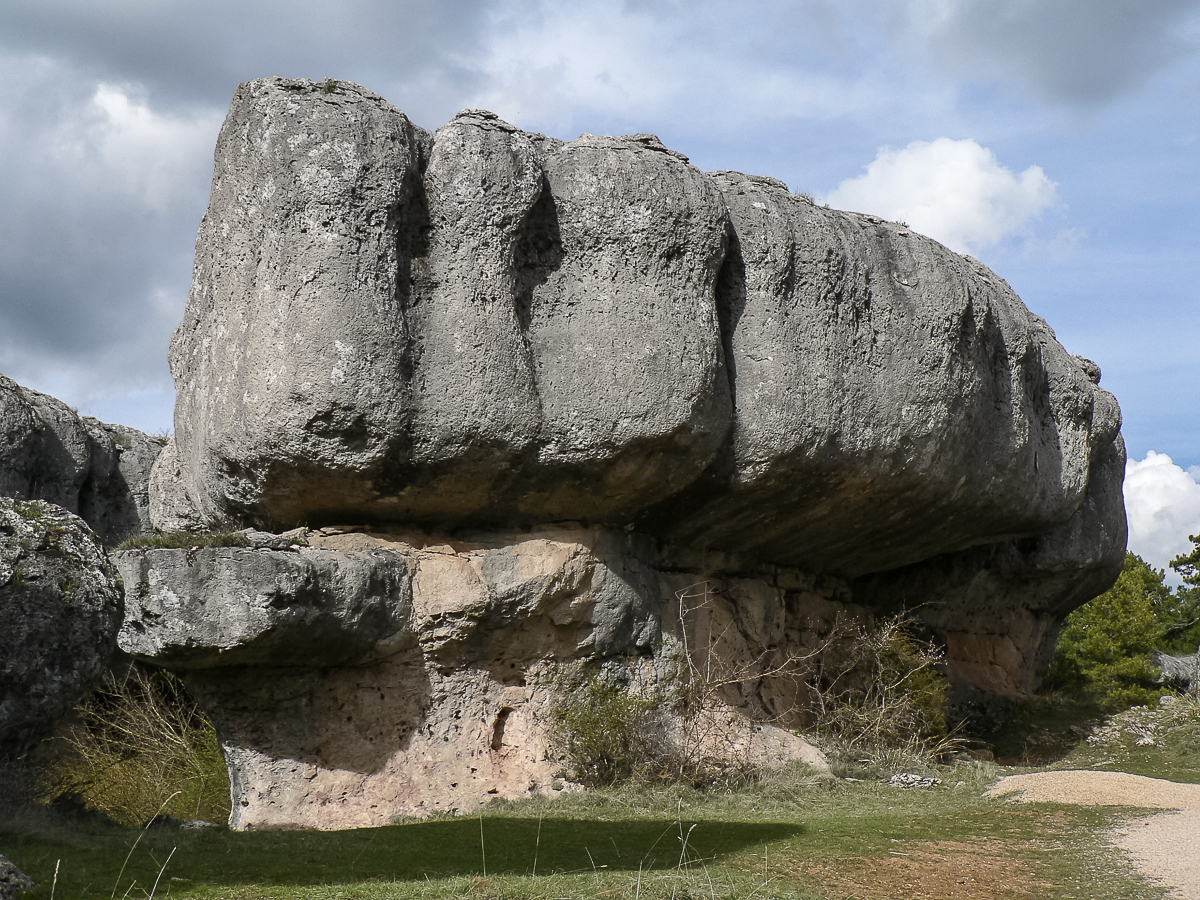
Natural land formations in Ciudad Encantada

=== Hydrography ===
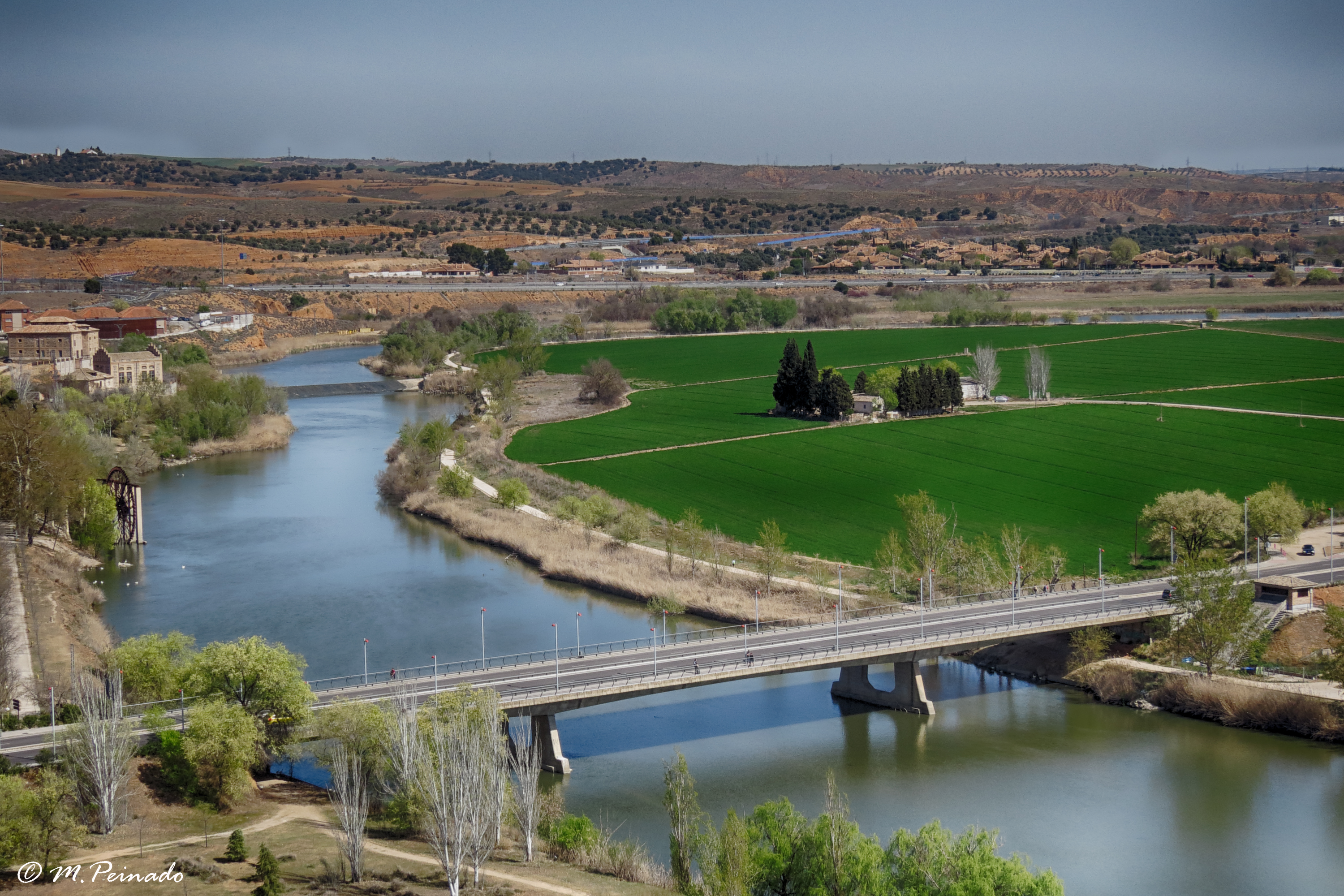
The Tagus passing through the province of Toledo

The territory of Castilla–La Mancha is divided into five principal watersheds. The Tagus, Guadiana, and Guadalquivir drain into the Atlantic Ocean and the Júcar and Segura into the Mediterranean Sea. The Tagus provides water for some 587,000 inhabitants in a watershed of 26,699 square kilometres (10,309 sq mi). It includes the entire province of Guadalajara and the greater part of the province of Toledo, including the two largest cities of the latter province: the capital, Toledo, as well as Talavera de la Reina.

The Guadiana watershed extends 26,646 square kilometres (10,288 sq mi) in Castilla–La Mancha, 37 percent of that river's entire watershed, with a population of 583,259 inhabitants. It includes the southern part of the province of Toledo, nearly all of the province of Ciudad Real (except the very south), the southwest of the province of Cuenca and the northwest of the province of Albacete. The Guadalquivir watershed extends over 5.2 percent of the surface area of the autonomous community, extending 4,100 square kilometres (1,600 sq mi) through the southern parts of the provinces of Ciudad Real and Albacete, including such important population center as Puertollano.

The Júcar watershed had, in 2006, 397,000 inhabitants in an area of 15,737 square kilometres (6,076 sq mi), 19.9 percent of the Castilian-Manchegan territory and 36.6 percent of total of the Júcar watershed. It includes the eastern parts of the provinces of Cuenca and Albacete, including their respective capitals. Finally, the 34 municipalities of southeastern Albacete fall in the Segura watershed, with an extent of 4,713 square kilometres (1,820 sq mi).

=== Climate ===
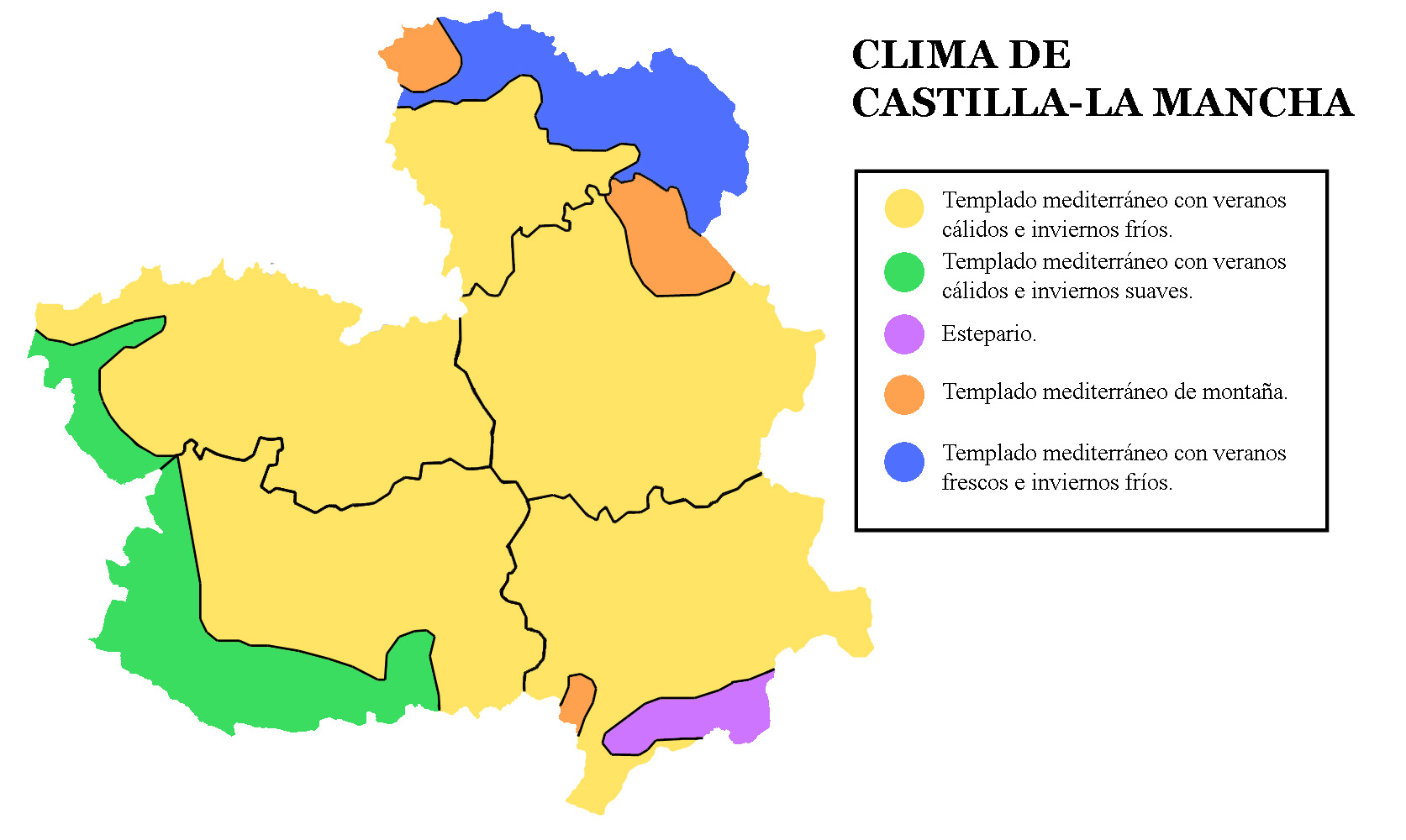
Climates of Castilla–La Mancha

The predominant climate in Castilla–La-Mancha is the hot summer mediterranean climate (Köppen climate classification: Csa), while the cold semi-arid climate (BSk) is also significant occupying most of the provinces of Toledo and Albacete. The warm summer mediterranean climate (Csb) can also be found, especially in the north of the community. To a lesser extent, there is the presence of an oceanic climate (Cfb) along the border with Aragon.

Lack of a marine influence leads to much more extreme temperatures: hotter summers and quite cold winters, with a daily oscillation as high as 18.5 °C (65.3 °F) on some areas. Summer is the driest season, with temperatures often exceeding 30 °C (86 °F), and temperatures above 35 °C (95 °F) are common in several areas. In winter, temperatures often drop below 0 °C (32 °F), producing frosts on clear nights, and occasional snow on cloudy nights. Most of the community has continental influences, although the climate is not exactly continental, as the average temperatures in the coldest month are above 0 °C (32 °F). Annual temperature ranges can reach over 20 °C (68 °F).

Castilla–La Mancha is part of what has traditionally been called España Seca ("Dry Spain"). Precipitation in general is relatively scarce, even in areas with a Mediterranean climate, although there are areas that receive more than 1,000 millimetres (39 in). Precipitation presents a notable gradient from the center of the region, where it does not surpass 400 millimetres (16 in) per year, to the mountains where it can exceed 1,000 millimetres (39 in) per year, on the slopes of the Sierra de Gredos and the Serranía de Cuenca. The greater part of the region has less than 600 millimetres (24 in) of rain annually. The driest area of Castilla–La Mancha is in the southeast of the community, near the border with the Region of Murcia, where rainfall does not exceed 300 millimetres (12 in).

Climate data for Castilla–La-Mancha (1991–2020), extremes (1920–present)
Month	Jan	Feb	Mar	Apr	May	Jun	Jul	Aug	Sep	Oct	Nov	Dec	Year
Record high °C (°F)	27.7 (81.9)	33.8 (92.8)	32.5 (90.5)	37.2 (99.0)	40.2 (104.4)	44.0 (111.2)	44.9 (112.8)	45.7 (114.3)	43.5 (110.3)	36.0 (96.8)	30.6 (87.1)	25.8 (78.4)	45.7 (114.3)
Mean daily maximum °C (°F)	10.1 (50.2)	12.1 (53.8)	15.8 (60.4)	18.3 (64.9)	23.0 (73.4)	29.1 (84.4)	33.3 (91.9)	32.7 (90.9)	26.9 (80.4)	20.5 (68.9)	13.9 (57.0)	10.6 (51.1)	20.5 (68.9)
Daily mean °C (°F)	5.2 (41.4)	6.5 (43.7)	9.5 (49.1)	11.9 (53.4)	16.1 (61.0)	21.3 (70.3)	24.8 (76.6)	24.5 (76.1)	19.7 (67.5)	14.6 (58.3)	8.9 (48.0)	5.9 (42.6)	14.1 (57.3)
Mean daily minimum °C (°F)	0.2 (32.4)	0.8 (33.4)	3.3 (37.9)	5.5 (41.9)	9.3 (48.7)	13.5 (56.3)	16.4 (61.5)	16.4 (61.5)	12.6 (54.7)	8.6 (47.5)	3.9 (39.0)	1.2 (34.2)	7.6 (45.8)
Record low °C (°F)	−28.2 (−18.8)	−22.5 (−8.5)	−15.6 (3.9)	−8.6 (16.5)	−5.2 (22.6)	−1.8 (28.8)	1.0 (33.8)	0.2 (32.4)	−3.6 (25.5)	−6.4 (20.5)	−18.8 (−1.8)	−28.0 (−18.4)	−28.2 (−18.8)
Average precipitation mm (inches)	41.3 (1.63)	37.2 (1.46)	46.3 (1.82)	54.2 (2.13)	48.6 (1.91)	25.9 (1.02)	7.9 (0.31)	13.1 (0.52)	34.2 (1.35)	58.7 (2.31)	53.2 (2.09)	53.2 (2.09)	473.8 (18.64)
Source: Agencia Estatal de Meteorologia

== Government and administration ==
Article 8 of the Statute of Autonomy states that the powers of the region are exercised through the Junta of Communities of Castilla–La Mancha (Junta de Comunidades de Castilla–La Mancha). Organs of the Junta are the Cortes of Castilla–La Mancha, the President of the Junta and the Council of Government.

=== Cortes of Castilla–La Mancha ===
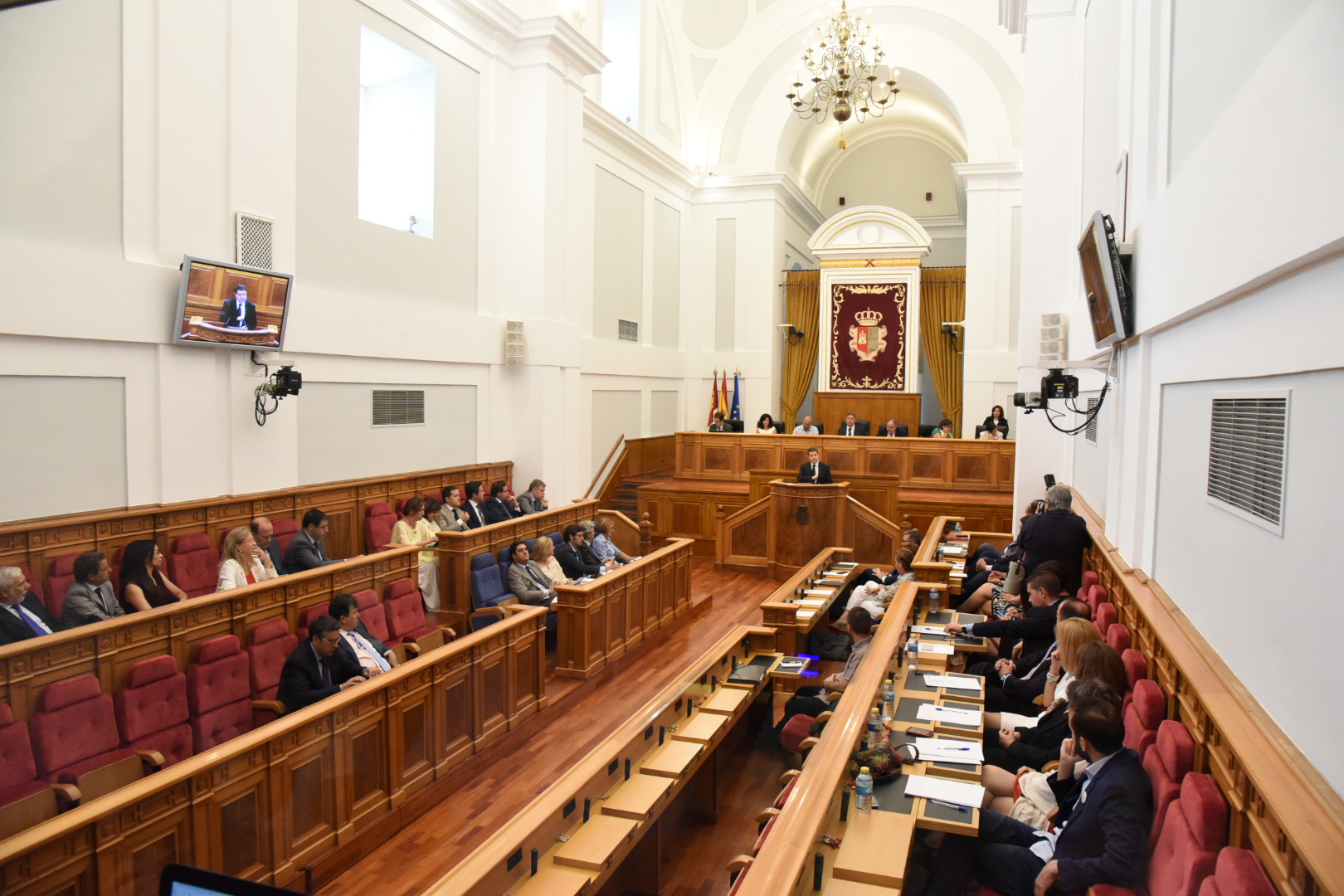
Plenary chamber of the Cortes

The Cortes of Castilla–La Mancha represent the popular will through 33 deputies elected by universal adult suffrage through the secret ballot. They are elected for a term of four years under a proportional system intended to guarantee representation to the various territorial zones of Castilla–La Mancha. The electoral constituency is at the level of each province, with provinces being assigned the following number of deputies as of 2023: Albacete, 7; Ciudad Real, 7; Cuenca, 5; Guadalajara, 5; and Toledo, 9. Article 10 of the Statute of Autonomy states that elections will be convoked by the President of the Junta of Communities, following the General Electoral Regime (Régimen Electoral General), on the fourth Sunday in May every four years. This stands in contrast to the autonomous communities of the Basque Country, Catalonia, Galicia, Andalusia and the Valencian Community where the president has the power to convoke elections at any time.

Since the Spanish regional elections of 2023, the Cortes of Castilla–La Mancha has consisted of 17 deputies from social democratic PSOE, 12 from conservative People's Party and 4 from far right Vox. The Cortes sits in the former Franciscan convent in Toledo, the Edificio de San Gil ("San Gil building").

=== Council of Government ===
The Council of Government is the collegial executive organ of the region. It directs regional political and administrative action, exercises an executive function and regulatory powers under the Spanish Constitution of 1978, the Statute of Autonomy, and the laws of the nation and region. The Council of Government consists of the president, vice presidents (if any) and the Councilors.

=== President of the Junta ===
The President of the Junta directs the Council of Government and coordinates the functions of its members. The president is elected by the Cortes from among its members, then formally named by the monarch of Spain. The president's official residence is the Palace of Fuensalida in Toledo.

=== Administrative divisions ===
Map of the provinces of Castilla–La Mancha

Castilla–La Mancha is divided into 5 provinces, named after their capital cities:

Province	Capital	Population (2025)	Area (km²)	Density (inh.km²)	Municipalities
Albacete	Albacete	390,751	14,931.74	26.2	87
Ciudad Real	Ciudad Real	494,848	19,812.04	25.0	102
Cuenca	Cuenca	199,859	17,121.15	11.7	238
Guadalajara	Guadalajara	285,839	12,213.17	23.4	288
Toledo	Toledo	755,081	15,369.34	49.1	204

As of 2025, Castilla–La Mancha consists of 919 municipalities, which amount to 11.3% of all the municipalities in Spain. 526 of these have less than 500 inhabitants, 210 have between 501 and 2,000 inhabitants, 145 between 2,000 and 10,000 inhabitants, and only 38 have more than 10,000 inhabitants. The municipalities in the north are small and numerous, while in the south they are larger and fewer. This reflects different histories of how these sub-regions were repopulated during the Reconquista.

==== Comarcas ====
Although the Statute of Autonomy allows for comarcas of political/juridical significance, this has never been followed through at the level of the entire region, and there are no comarcas in Castilla–La Mancha with political or juridical functions. Individual provinces of Castilla–La Mancha have performed comarcalizations for administrative, economic and touristic purposes. Many Castellano–Manchegan comarcas important traditional significance, with some figuring in history well beyond their respective provinces.

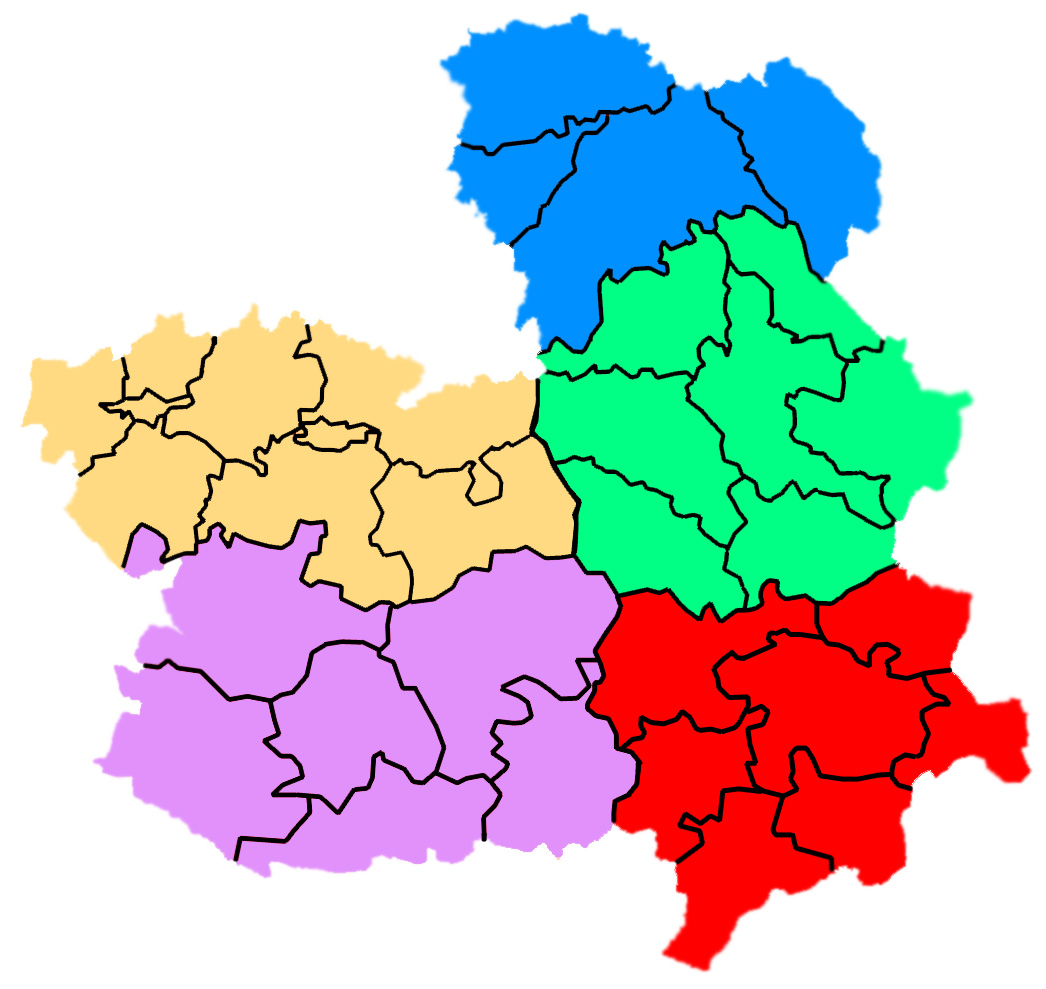
Comarcal division of Castilla–La Mancha

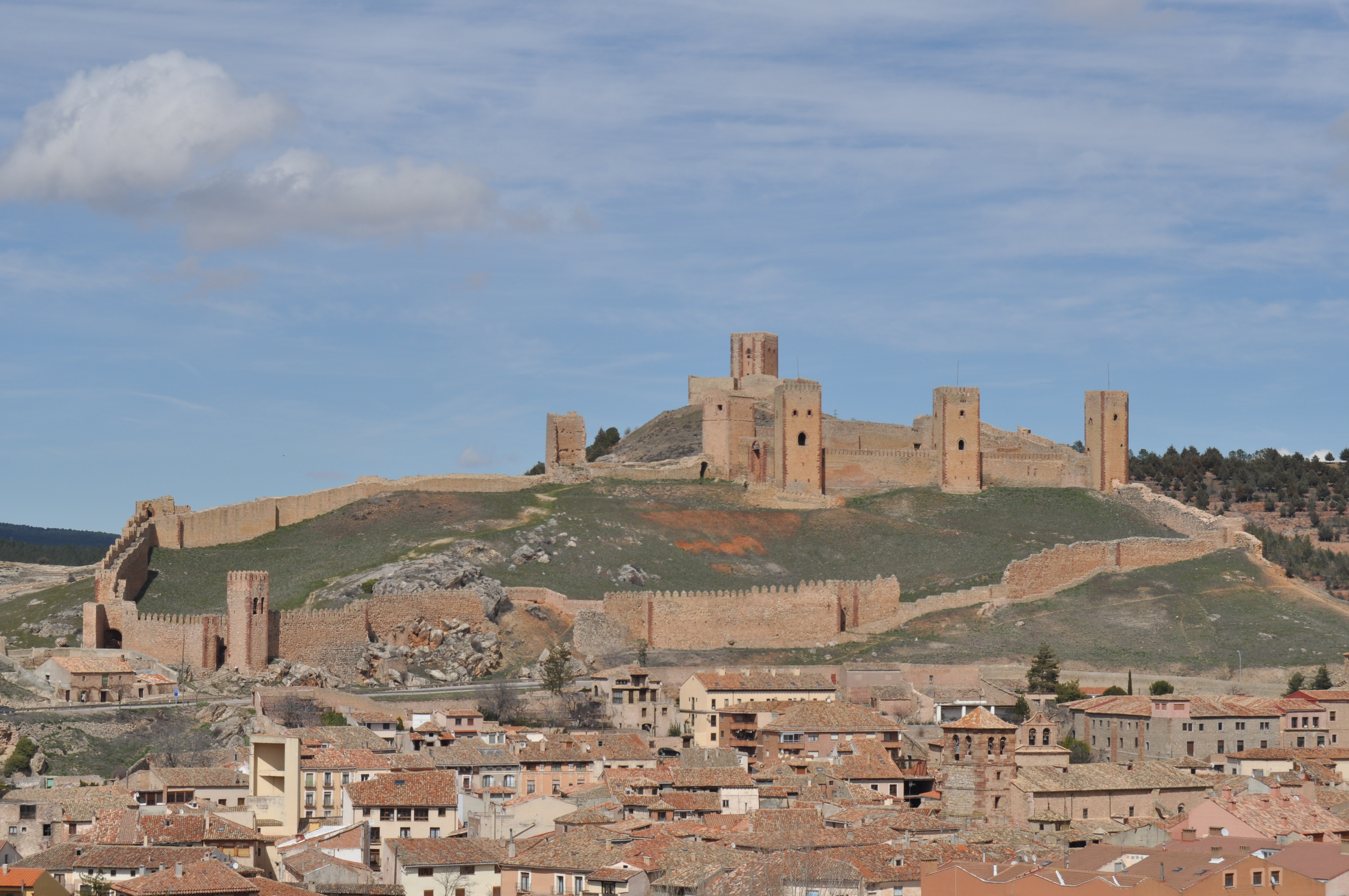
Alcázar of Molina de Aragón with its walls

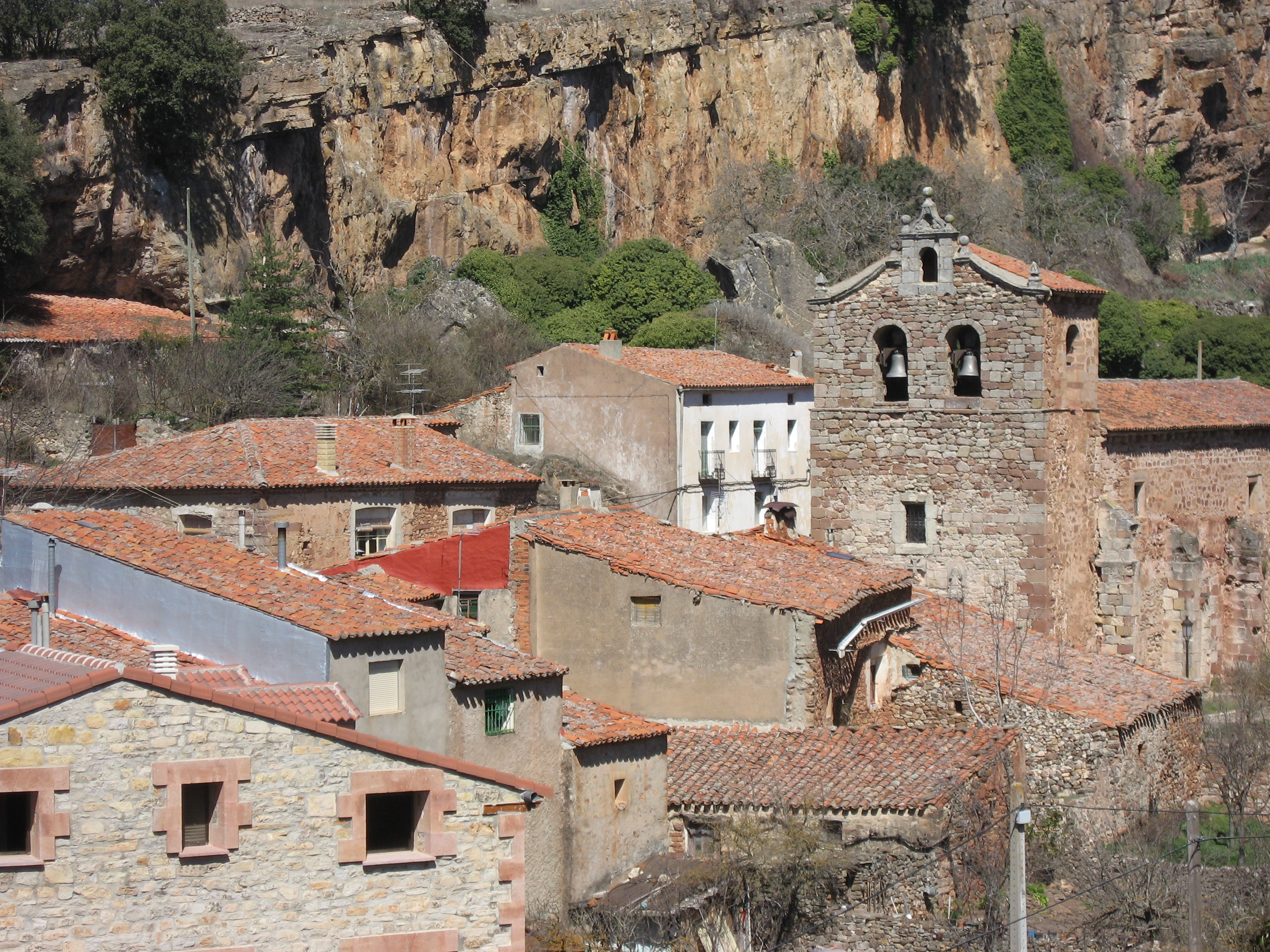
Anguita, a village from La Serranía (Guadalajara)

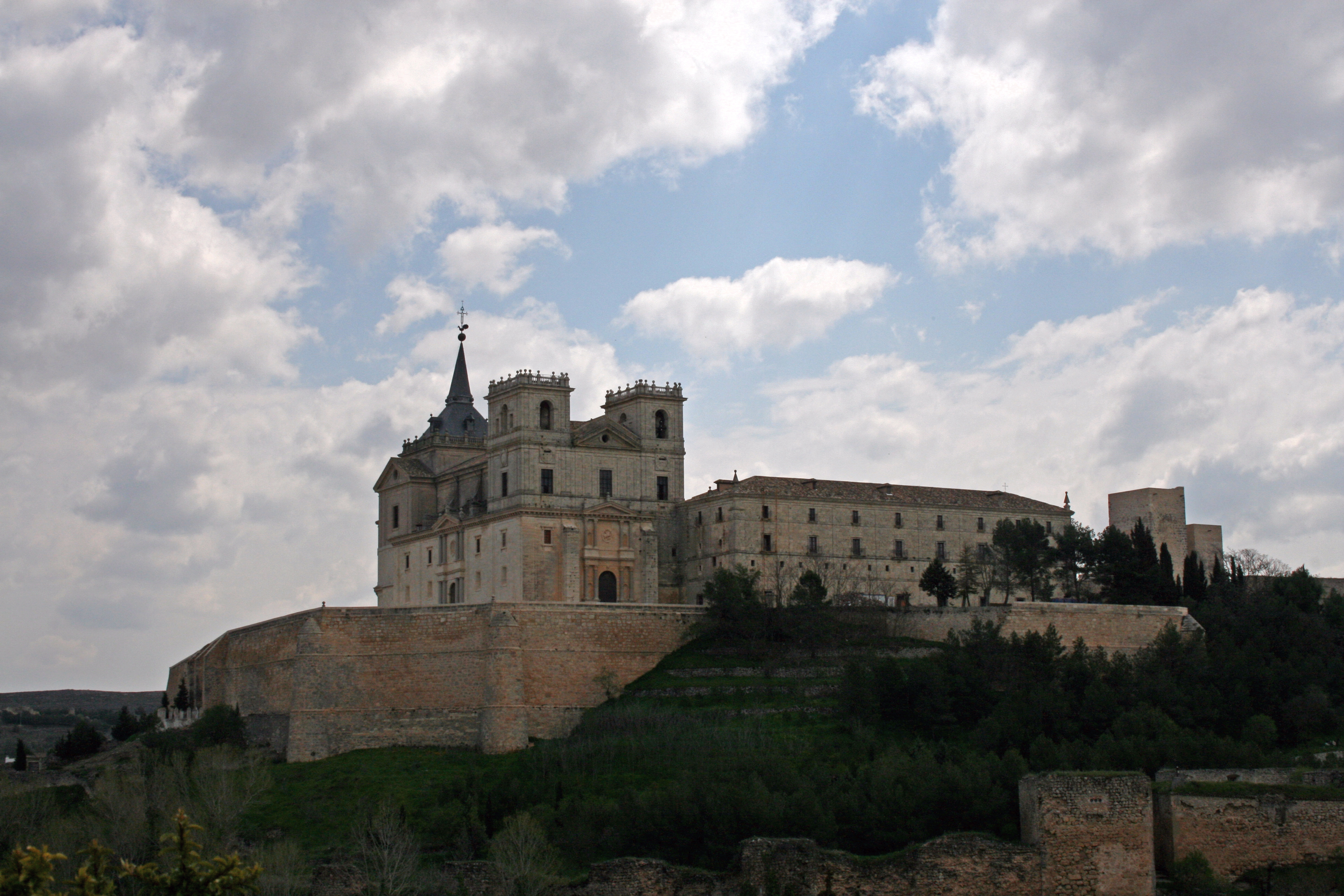
Monasterio de Uclés, in Uclés

- Comarcas of Albacete:
  - Campos de Hellín
  - Llanos de Albacete
  - La Mancha del Júcar-Centro
  - Manchuela albaceteña
  - Monte Ibérico–Corredor de Almansa
  - Sierra de Alcaraz y Campo de Montiel
  - Sierra del Segura
- Comarcas of Ciudad Real:
  - Alcudia
  - Campo de Calatrava
  - Mancha
  - Montes
  - Montiel
  - Sierra Morena
- Comarcas of Cuenca:
  - La Alcarria conquense
  - La Mancha de Cuenca
  - Manchuela conquense
  - Serranía Alta
  - Serranía Media-Campichuelo
  - Serranía Baja
- Comarcas of Guadalajara:
  - La Alcarria (comarca)
  - La Campiña (comarca)
  - Señorío de Molina
  - La Serranía
- Comarcas of Toledo:
  - La Campana de Oropesa
  - La Jara
  - La Mancha Alta de Toledo
  - Mesa de Ocaña
  - Montes de Toledo
  - La Sagra
  - Sierra de San Vicente
  - Talavera (co-extensive with the municipality of Talavera de la Reina).
  - Toledo (co-extensive with the municipality of Toledo).
  - Torrijos

== Demographics ==
Historical population
Year	Pop.	±%
1842	1,039,864	—
1857	1,203,552	+15.7%
1877	1,249,710	+3.8%
1887	1,325,814	+6.1%
1900	1,394,670	+5.2%
1910	1,550,093	+11.1%
1920	1,674,207	+8.0%
1930	1,849,999	+10.5%
1940	1,959,213	+5.9%
1950	2,059,659	+5.1%
1960	2,015,262	−2.2%
1970	1,732,696	−14.0%
1981	1,648,584	−4.9%
1991	1,658,446	+0.6%
2001	1,760,516	+6.2%
2011	2,106,331	+19.6%
2021	2,052,505	−2.6%
Source: INE

As of 2025, the population is 2,126,378, of which 50.2% are males, and 49.8% are females. Minors make up 17.1% of the population, and seniors make up 20.1%.

Large parts of the region are experiencing a demographic decline. In contrast, besides the provincial capitals, two specific areas bordering the Madrid region associated to the Madrid metropolitan area have experienced a population growth well above the national average: La Sagra (around the A-42 highway) and the Henares Corridor (around the A-2). Overall, as of 2016, the NUTS-2 region of Castilla–La Mancha featured an average index of demographic vulnerability of 30, similar to those of the European regions of Upper Palatinate (Germany), Styria (Austria), Catalonia (Spain), Overijssel (Netherlands) and Campania (Italy).

=== Population density ===
Municipal population density in Castilla–La Mancha (2020): 0–9.9 inhabitants/km^{2} 10–19.9 inhabitants/km^{2} 20–29.9 inhabitants/km^{2} 30–39.9 inhabitants/km^{2} 40–49.9 inhabitants/km^{2} 50–59.9 inhabitants/km^{2} 60–69.9 inhabitants/km^{2} 70–79.9 inhabitants/km^{2} 80–89.9 inhabitants/km^{2} 90–99.9 inhabitants/km^{2} 100+ inhabitants/km^{2}

With an average population density of 26.8 per square kilometre (69/sq mi), Castilla–La Mancha has the 3rd least dense population in all of Spain: the national average is 97.1 per square kilometre (251/sq mi). Industrialized zones such as the Henares Corridor (along the river Henares, a tributary of the Jarama) with a density of 126 per square kilometre (330/sq mi), the comarca of la Sagra or the industrial zone of Sonseca are dramatically more dense than the region as a whole.

=== Vital statistics ===
As of 2024, the birth rate in Castilla–La Mancha is 6.71 per 1,000 inhabitants, while the death rate is 9.34 per 1,000 inhabitants, resulting in a natural population change rate of -2.63 per 1,000.

Life expectancy at birth is the 10th-highest in Spain: 86.33 years for women, 81.43 years for men, and 83.85 for both genders as of 2024.

=== Urbanization ===
The 2020 report on urban areas in Spain published by the Ministry of Transports, Mobility and Urban Agenda identifies among the urban areas in the region (with population data referring to 2019) those of Albacete (173,329), Guadalajara (161,683), Toledo (123,509), Talavera de la Reina (94,028), Ciudad Real (90,114), Cuenca (54,690) and Puertollano (47,035).

Largest municipalities in Castilla–La Mancha INE – 2025
Rank		Province	Pop.	Rank		Province	Pop.
1	Albacete	Albacete	175,068	11	Alcázar de San Juan	Ciudad Real	31,907
2	Guadalajara	Guadalajara	92,798	12	Hellín	Albacete	30,911
3	Toledo	Toledo	87,074	13	Seseña	Toledo	30,889
4	Talavera de la Reina	Toledo	84,413	14	Valdepeñas	Ciudad Real	30,698
5	Ciudad Real	Ciudad Real	76,087	15	Villarrobledo	Albacete	25,418
6	Cuenca	Cuenca	53,761	16	Almansa	Albacete	24,603
7	Puertollano	Ciudad Real	45,699	17	Daimiel	Ciudad Real	17,741
8	Tomelloso	Ciudad Real	37,185	18	Manzanares	Ciudad Real	17,699
9	Azuqueca de Henares	Guadalajara	35,733	19	Tarancón	Cuenca	17,207
10	Illescas	Toledo	33,167	20	Ocaña	Toledo	16,039

=== Immigration ===
Foreign population by country of birth (2025)
Country of birth	Population
Morocco	57,164
Romania	49,926
Colombia	42,298
Venezuela	20,439
Peru	20,382
Ecuador	16,700
Dominican Republic	7,495
Paraguay	7,436
Argentina	7,035
Cuba	6,607

As of 2025, immigrants make up 15.1% of the population. The 5 largest foreign countries of birth are Morocco, Romania, Colombia, Venezuela, and Peru.

== Culture ==
=== Heritage protection ===
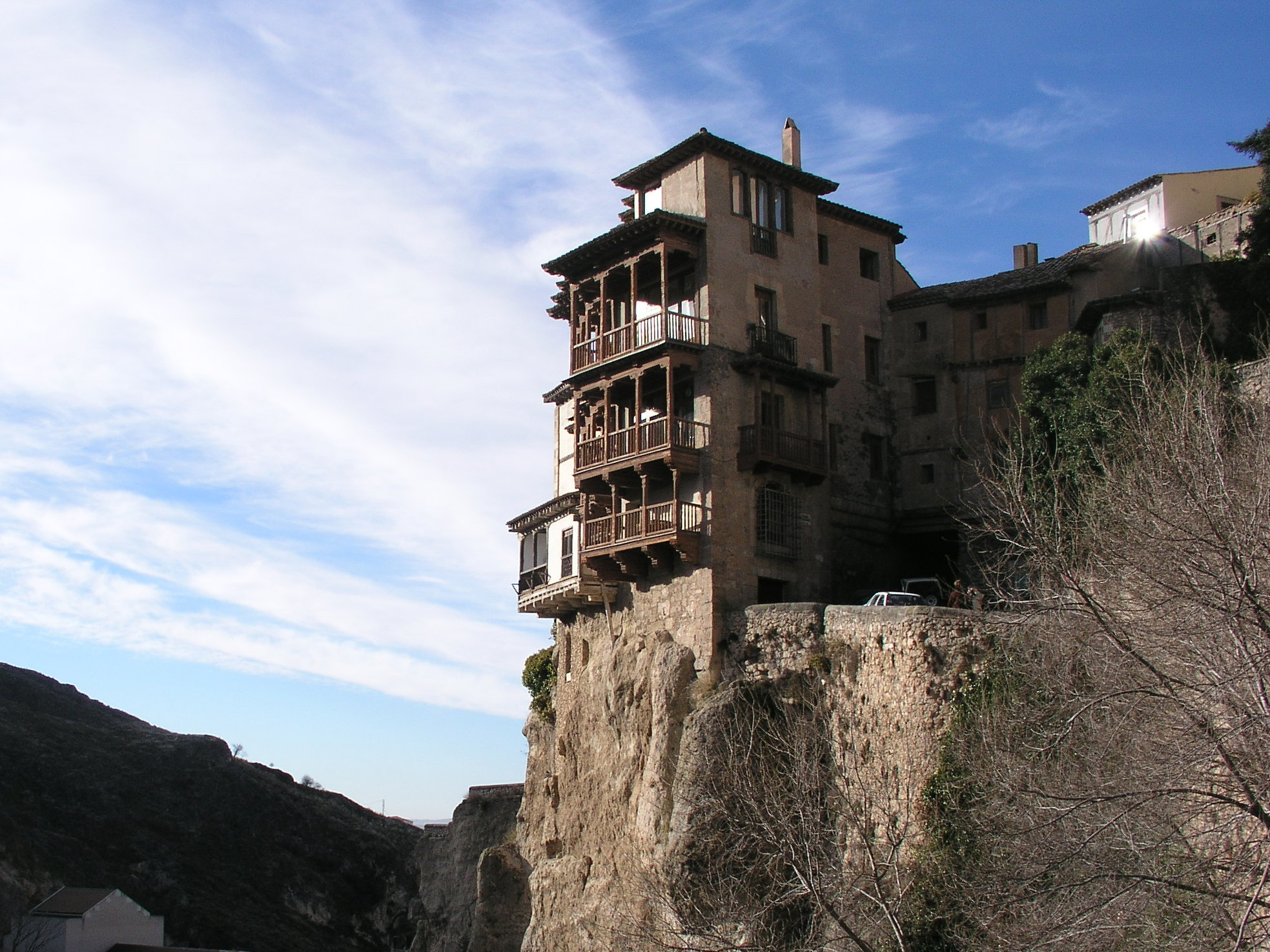
Hanging houses of Cuenca

The region hosts several World Heritage Sites: Toledo (since 1986), Cuenca (since 1996) and Almadén (together with the Slovenian town of Idrija under the Heritage of Mercury. Almadén and Idrija joint site) since 2012.

As of 2020, the region features 644 bienes de interés cultural (BIC) across the 5 provinces: Albacete (92), Ciudad Real (108), Cuenca (99), Guadalajara (104) and Toledo (238) plus another 3 transcending the provincial borders.

The regional legislation in force concerning the cultural heritage dates from 2013. Restrictions on the modification of historical buildings or the use of metal detectors were introduced then.

=== Symbols ===
The Organic Law 9/1982 (August 10, 1982), which is the Statute of Autonomy of Castilla–La Mancha established the flag of Castilla–La Mancha and the law 1/1983 (30 June 1983) established the coat of arms.

==== Flag ====
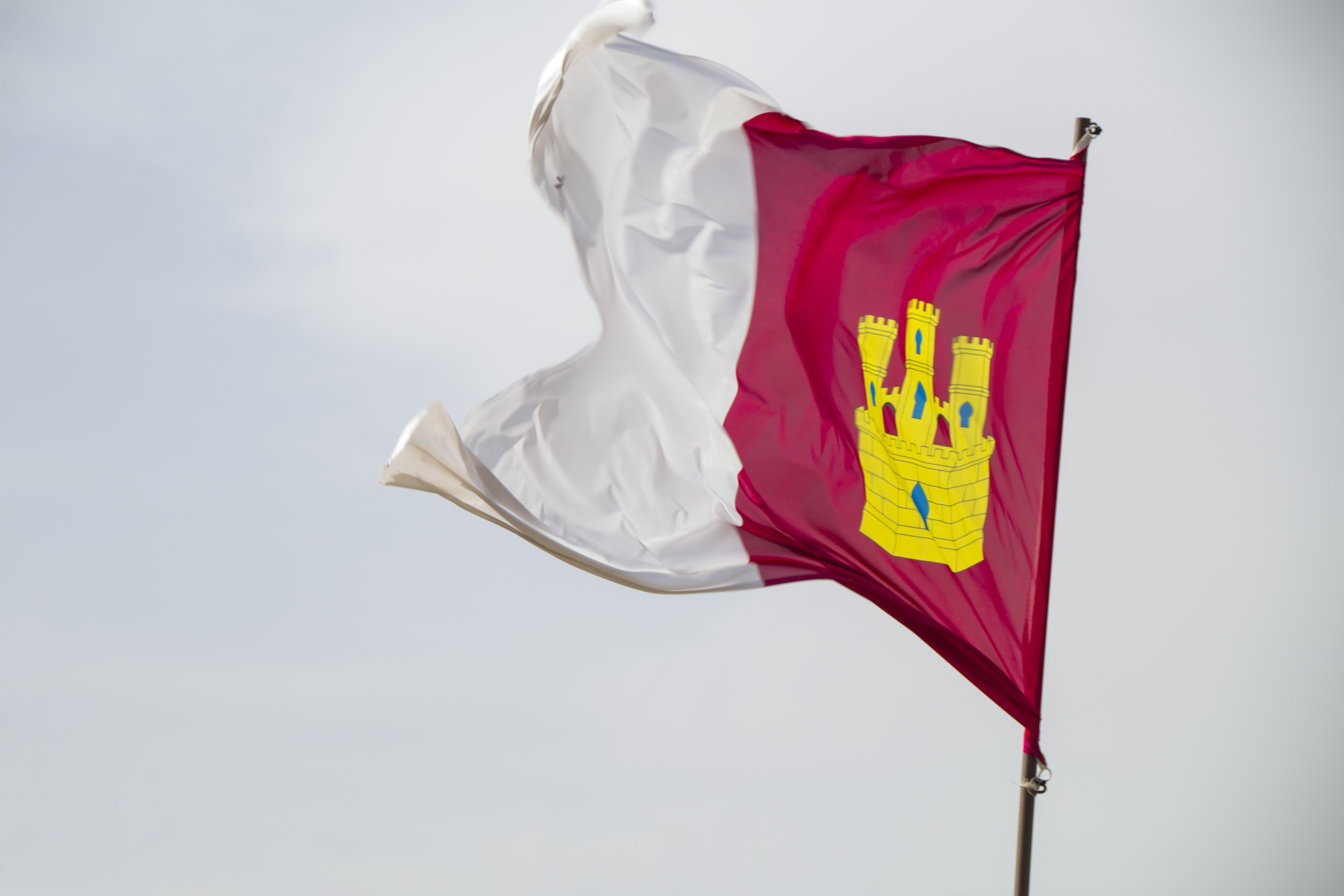
Waving flag of Castilla–La Mancha

Seven different designs for a flag were proposed during the era of the "pre-autonomous" region. The selected design was that of heraldist Ramón José Maldonado. This was made official in Article 5 of the Statute of Autonomy:

- One. The flag of the region consists of a rectangle divided vertically into two equal squares: the first, together with the mast, crimson red with a castle of Or masoned in sable and port and windows of azure; the second, white.
- Two. The flag of the region will fly at regional, provincial, or municipal public buildings, and will appear next to the Spanish flag, which will be displayed in the preeminent place; historic territories [provinces] may also be represented.

==== Coat of arms ====
The coat of arms of Castilla–La Mancha is based on the flag of the region, and not the other way around, as is more typical in heraldry. Article 1 of the law 1/1983 describes it as follows:

The coat of arms of the Communities of Castilla–La Mancha is party per pale. On the dexter [the statute literally says "On the first quarter"], on a field gules a castle Or, embattled, port and windows of azure and masoned sable. On the sinister [the statute literally says "The second quarter"], a field argent. On the crest, a royal crown enclosed, which is a circle of Or crimped with precious gems, composed of eight finials, of Acanthus mollis, five visible, topped by pearls and whose leaves emerge from diadems, which converge in a globe of azure or blue, with a semimeridian and the equator Or topped by a cross Or. The crown lined with gules or red.

Some institutions of the region have adopted this coat of arms as part of their own emblem, among these the Cortes of Castilla–La Mancha, the Consultative Council and the University of Castilla–La Mancha.

==== Anthem ====
Although Article 5 of the Statute of Autonomy indicates that the region will have its own anthem, after more than 25 years no such anthem has been adopted. Among the proposed anthems have been the "Canción del Sembrador" ("Song of the Sower") from the zarzuela La rosa del azafrán by Jacinto Guerrero, the "Canto a la Mancha" ("Song of La Mancha") by Tomás Barrera, and many others, such as one presented by a group of citizens from Villarrobledo with the title "Patria sin fin" ("Fatherland without end").

== Economy ==
Castilla–La Mancha generates a GDP of €33,077,484,000, 3.4 percent of the Spanish GDP, placing it ninth among the 19 Spanish autonomous communities. GDP has been roughly 3.4 percent of the national GDP since at least 2000. A per capita GDP of €17,339 places Castilla–La Mancha 17th among the 19 communities, with only Andalusia and Extremadura having lower per capita GDP; the national average is €22,152. Nonetheless, in the early to mid-1990s, Sonseca in the province of Toledo several times had the highest per capita income in Spain.

As of 2017, the regional gross value added structure is as follows:

- Public administration, healthcare and education: 21.9 %
- Trade, repair, transport and hotel and catering 20.0 %
- Manufacturing industry: 16.1 %
- Real estate activity: 9.5%
- Construction: 8.0 %
- Agriculture, husbandry and fishing: 6.8 %
- Energy and extractive industry: 4.7 %
- Professional activities: 4.0 %
- Artistic, recreational and entertainment activities: 3.4 %
- Information and communications: 2.9 %
- Insurance and financial activity: 2.8 %

According to the statistics of the INE's Encuesta de Población Activa for the first trimester of 2007, the active work force of Castilla–La Mancha numbered 896,513 persons, of whom 827,113 were employed and 69,900 unemployed, giving a workforce density of 55.5 percent of the population and an unemployment rate of 7.7 percent.

=== Agriculture and husbandry ===
Agriculture and husbandry, still the foundation of the local economy, constitutes 11.6 percent of regional GDP, and employs 9.9 percent of the active workforce.

Fifty-two percent of the soil of Castilla–La Mancha is considered "dry". Agricultural activities have historically been based on the cultivation of wheat (37.0 percent), grapes (17.2 percent) and olives (6.6 percent). Castilla–La Mancha has some of the most extensive vineyards in Europe, nearly 700,000 hectares (1,700,000 acres). The vineyards are predominantly, but by no means exclusively, in the west and southwest of La Mancha. In 2005 the region produced 3,074,462 metric tons (3,389,014 short tons) of grapes, constituting 53.4 percent of Spain's national production. After grapes, the next most important agricultural product is barley, 2,272,007 metric tons (2,504,459 short tons), 25.0 percent of the national total.

As of 2014, the region (primarily areas in the provinces of Cuenca and Albacete) was by far the largest producer of garlic in Spain, which was in turn the largest producer country in Europe. Black truffle is produced in areas of the provinces of Guadalajara, Cuenca and Albacete. The overwhelming majority of the saffron produced in Spain (97%) originates from the region.

The region concentrates the 81% of pistachio-cultivated area in the country, which increased fortyfold in a decade becoming the first European producer and fifth worldwide in the early 2020s.

In terms of agricultural productivity and income, since Spain's incorporation into the European Union (EU) the primary sector of the regional economy has evolved dynamically. Among the reasons for this are growth rates higher than the national average, as well as increased capitalization fostering specialization and modernization, including the integration an externalization of the sector, whereby activities previously performed on the farm are now performed elsewhere. These changes have been fostered by the regional articulation of the EU's Common Agricultural Policy. Since 1986, subsidies have played a significant role in this sector.

Animal husbandry plays a lesser, but not negiglible, role in the regional economy. 2005 statistics show 3,430,501 head of sheep, 1,602,576 pigs, 405,778 goats and 309,672 cattle; these last produce 224,692,000 liters (59,357,000 U.S. gal) of milk each year.

Apiculture (bee-keeping) is another significant part of the primary sector output, with 190,989 hives as of 4 October 2017.

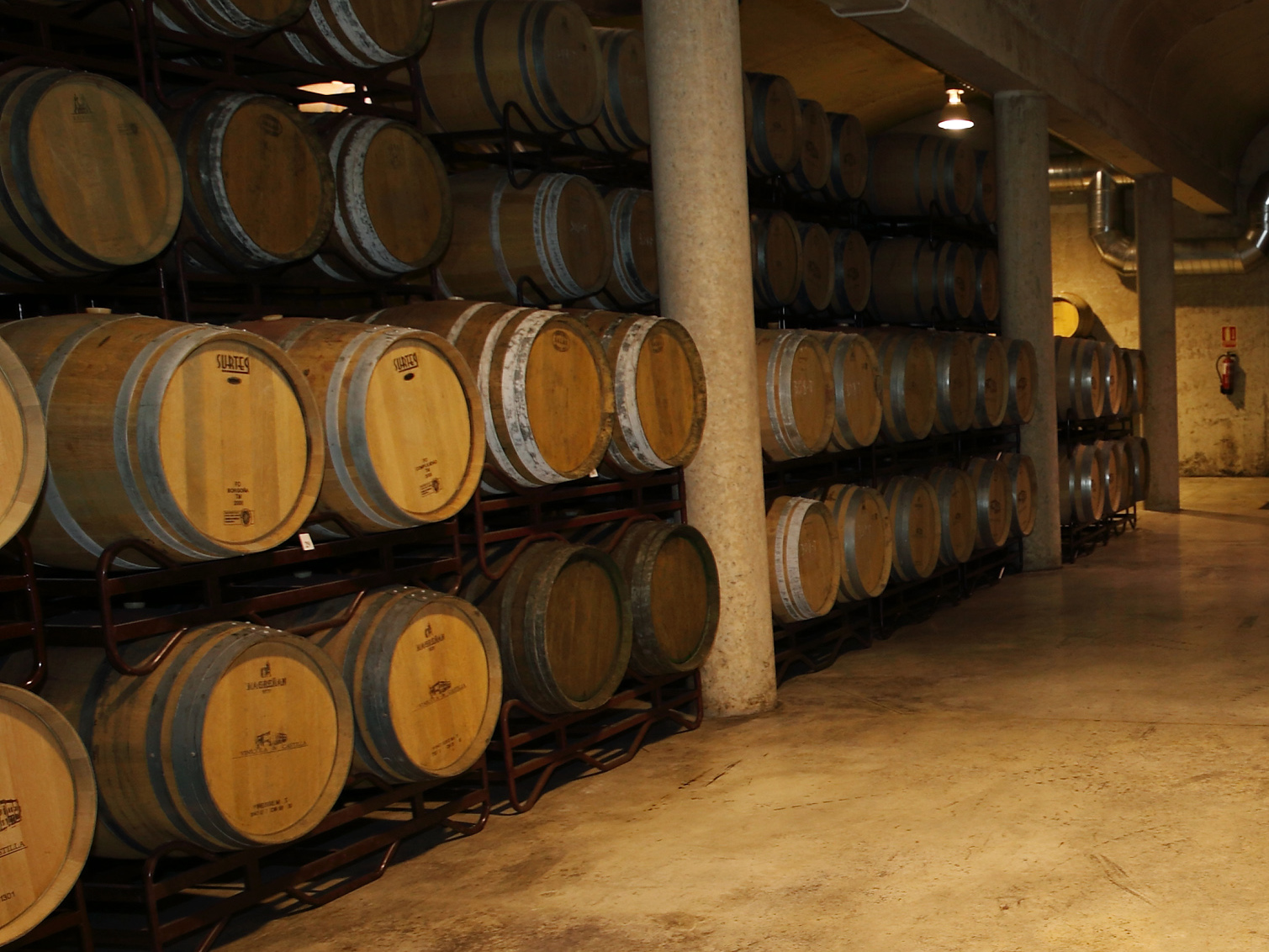
Winery in Manzanares

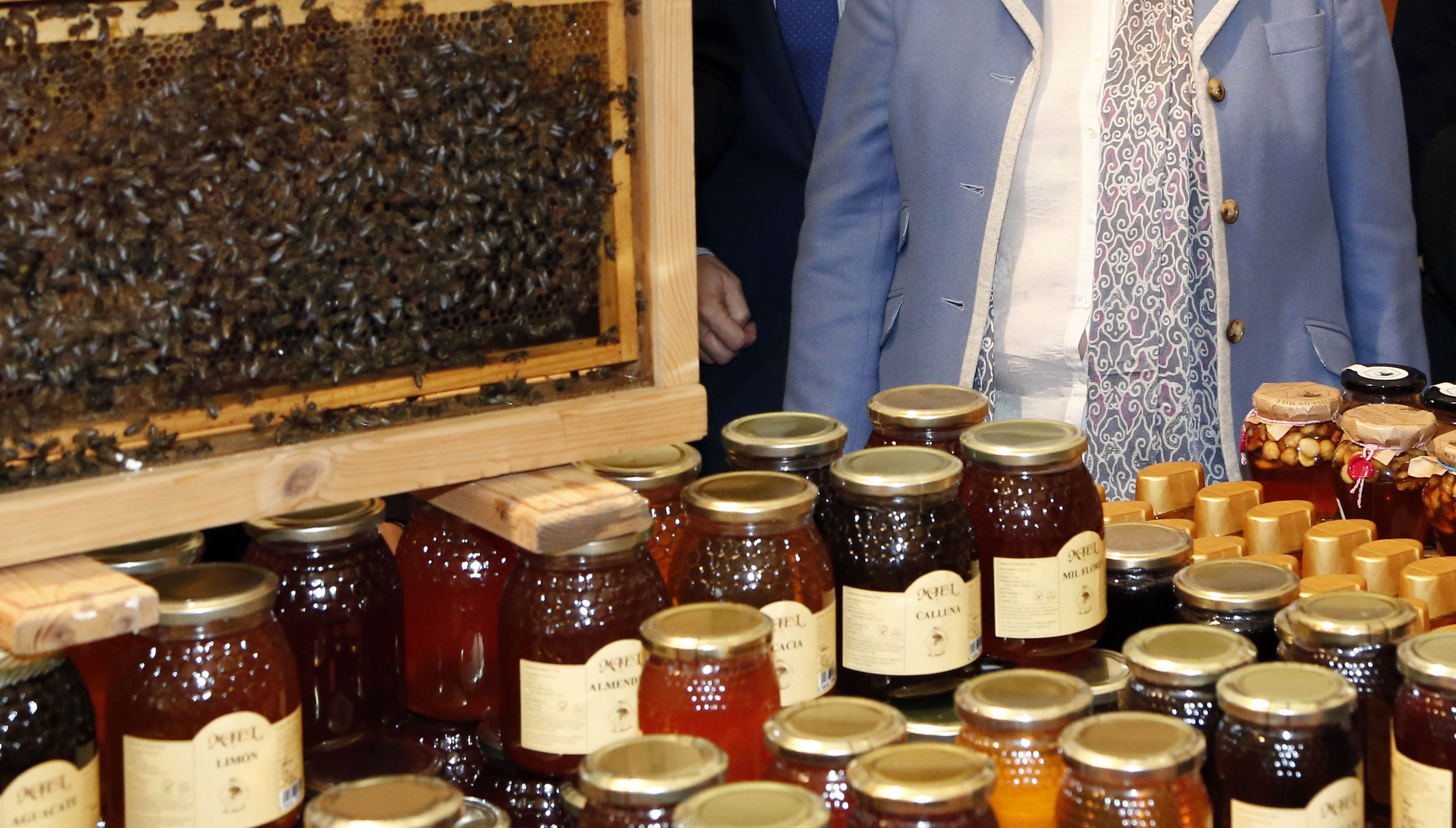
Honey jars in Pastrana

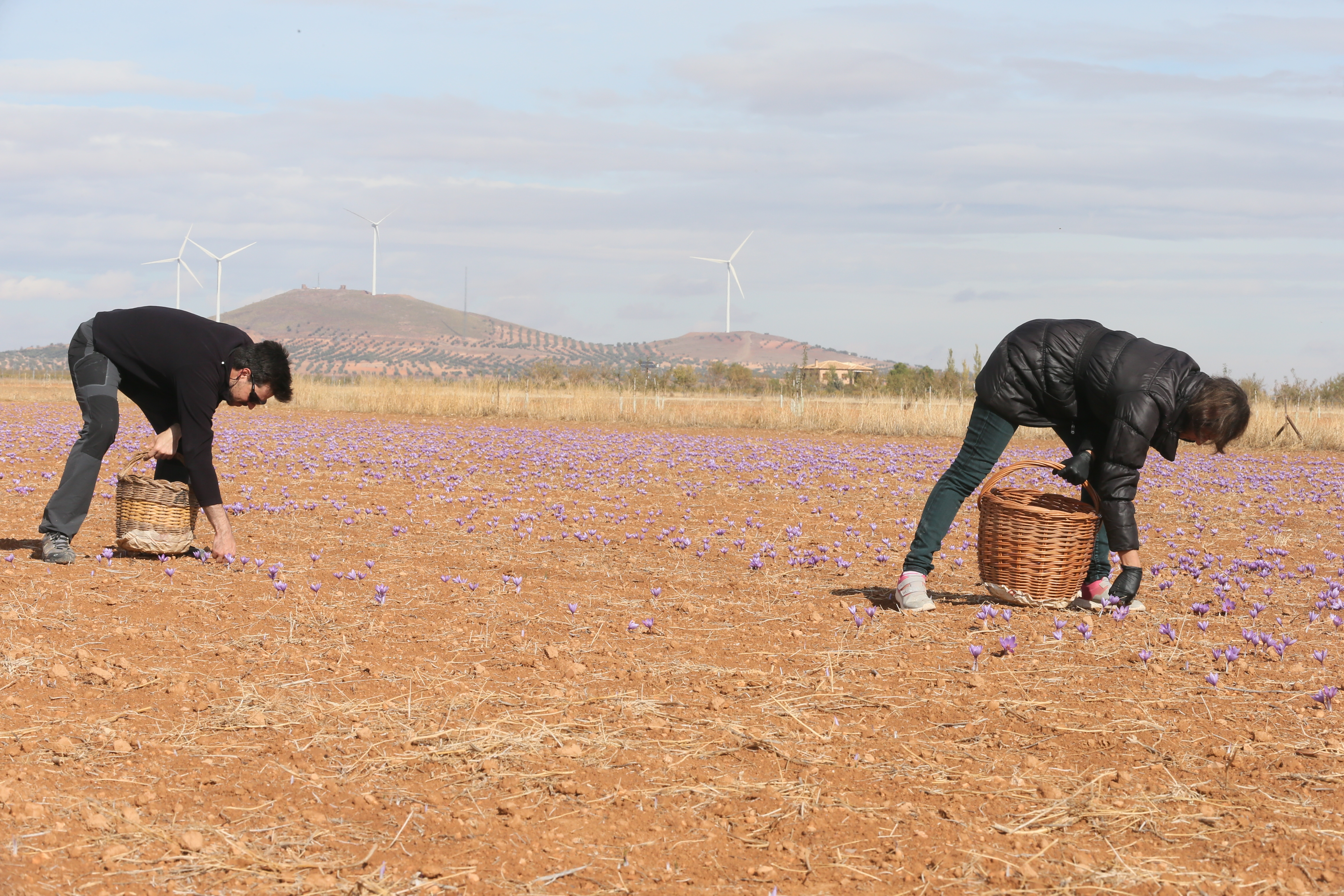
Harvest of saffron flowers in Madridejos

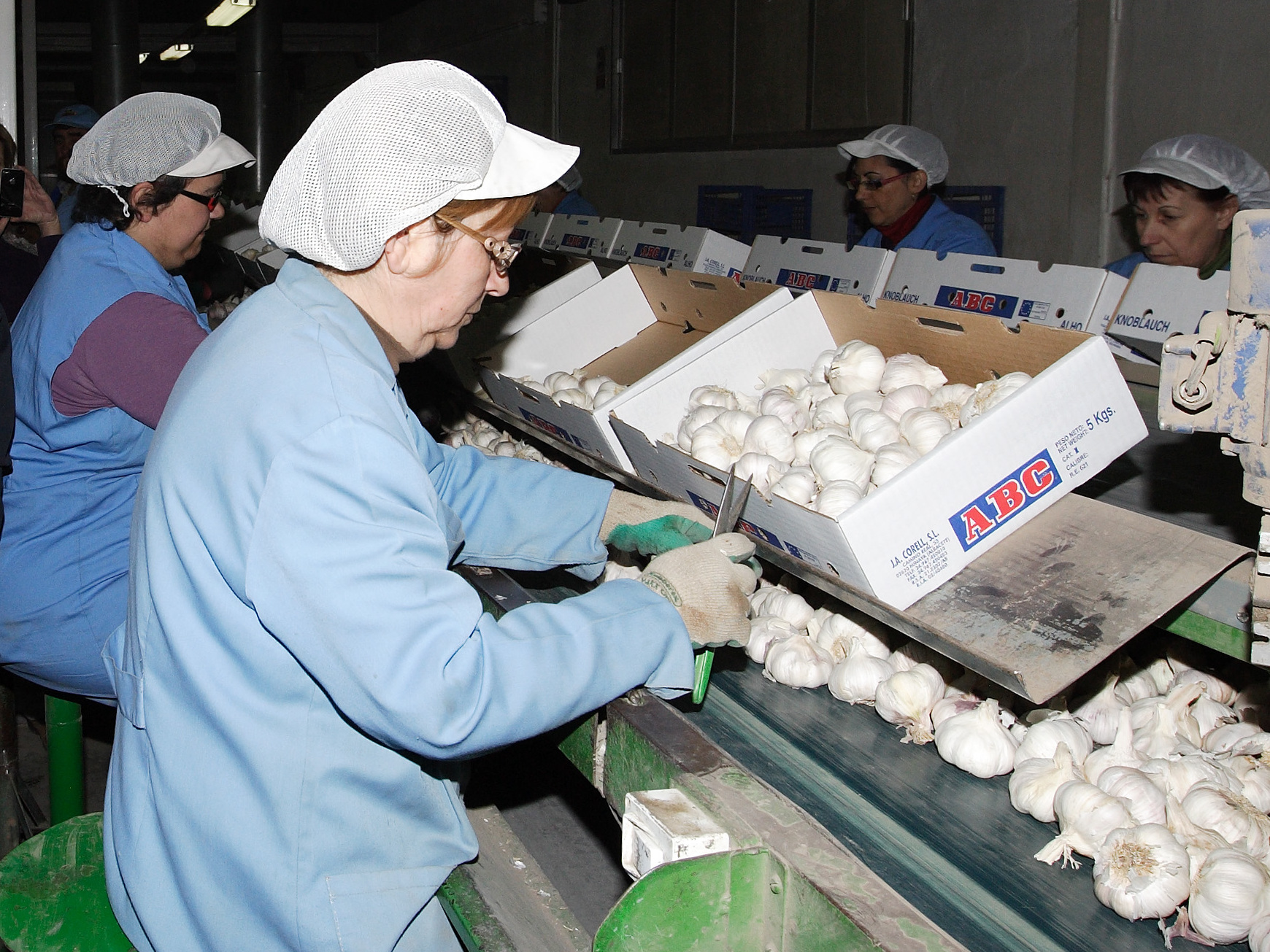
Garlic-processing workers in Minaya

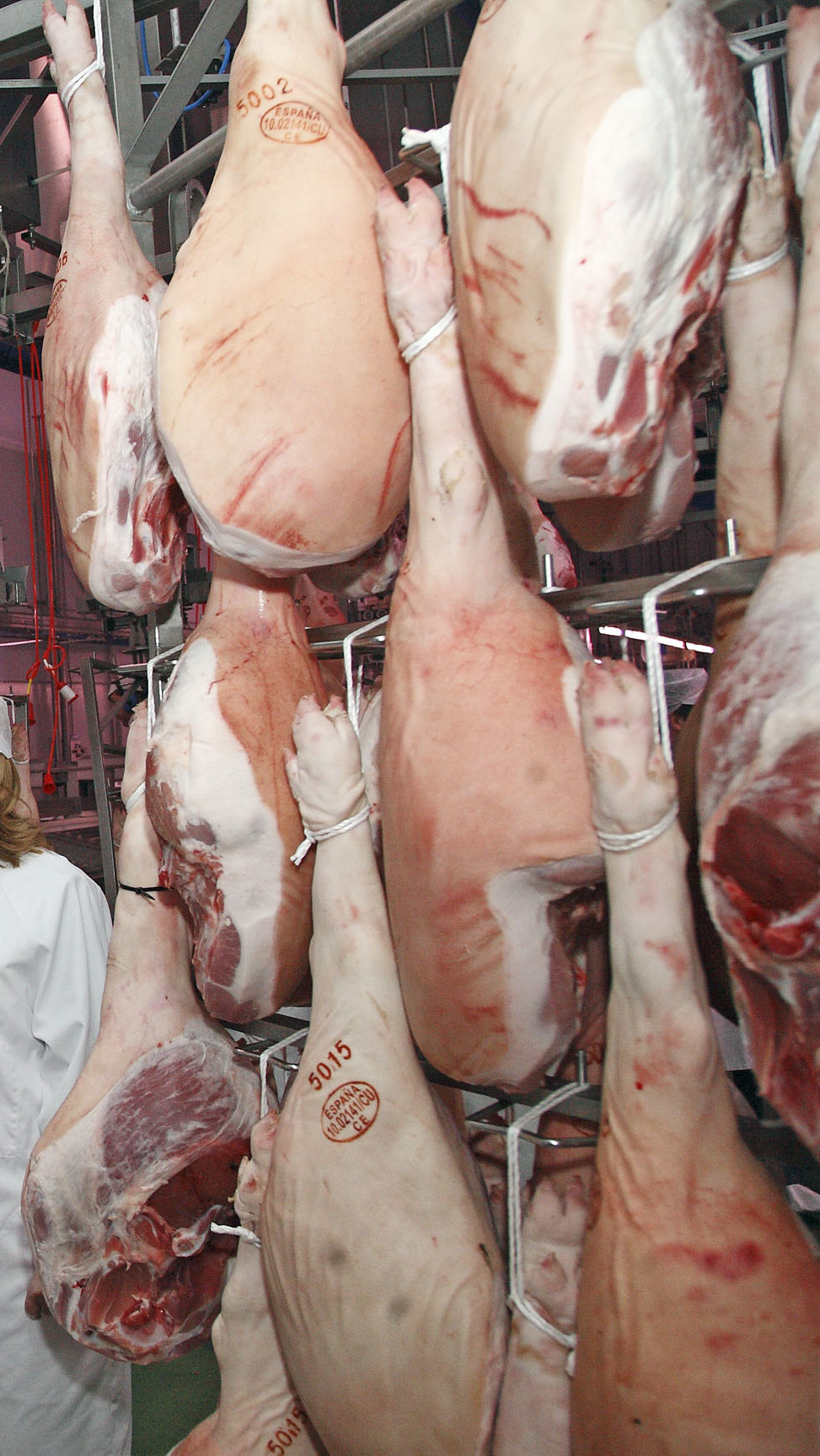
Hams in Tarancón

=== Industry and construction ===
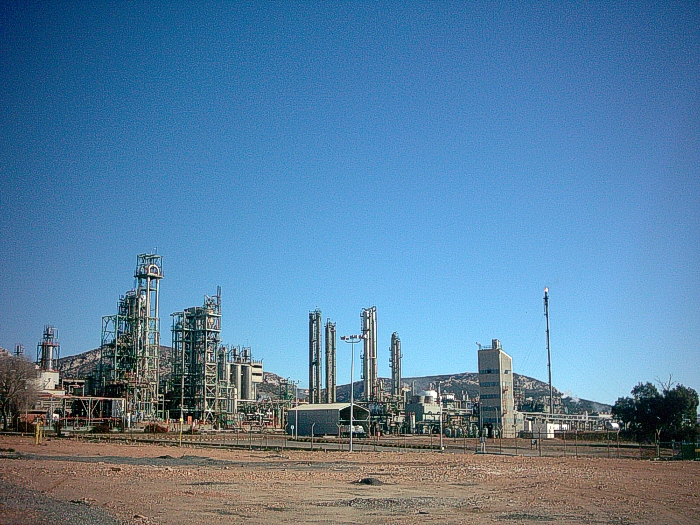
Partial view of the petrochemical complex at Puertollano

Traditionally, Castilla–La Mancha has had little industrial production, due to several factors among which are low population density and a shortage of qualified workers. However, since Spain's incorporation into the EU, there has been much progress. Industry has been growing as a sector of the regional economy at a faster pace than nationally. July 2006 figures show the region as third among the autonomous communities in the rate of growth of the industrial sector. Regional industrial GDP grew 2.8 percent in 2000–2005, compared to 1 percent nationally for the same period.

The greatest obstacles to industrial growth in the region have been:

- Lack of a dense business fabric.
- Undersized industrial enterprises.
- Little specialization of labor.
- Little investment in R & D.
- Poor infrastructure with respect to services to enterprises.
- Little export orientation.
- Inadequate marketing channels and distribution for regional products.

The principal industrial areas within the region are Sonseca and its comarca, the Henares Corridor, Puertollano, Talavera de la Reina, La Sagra y Almansa, as well as all of the provincial capitals.

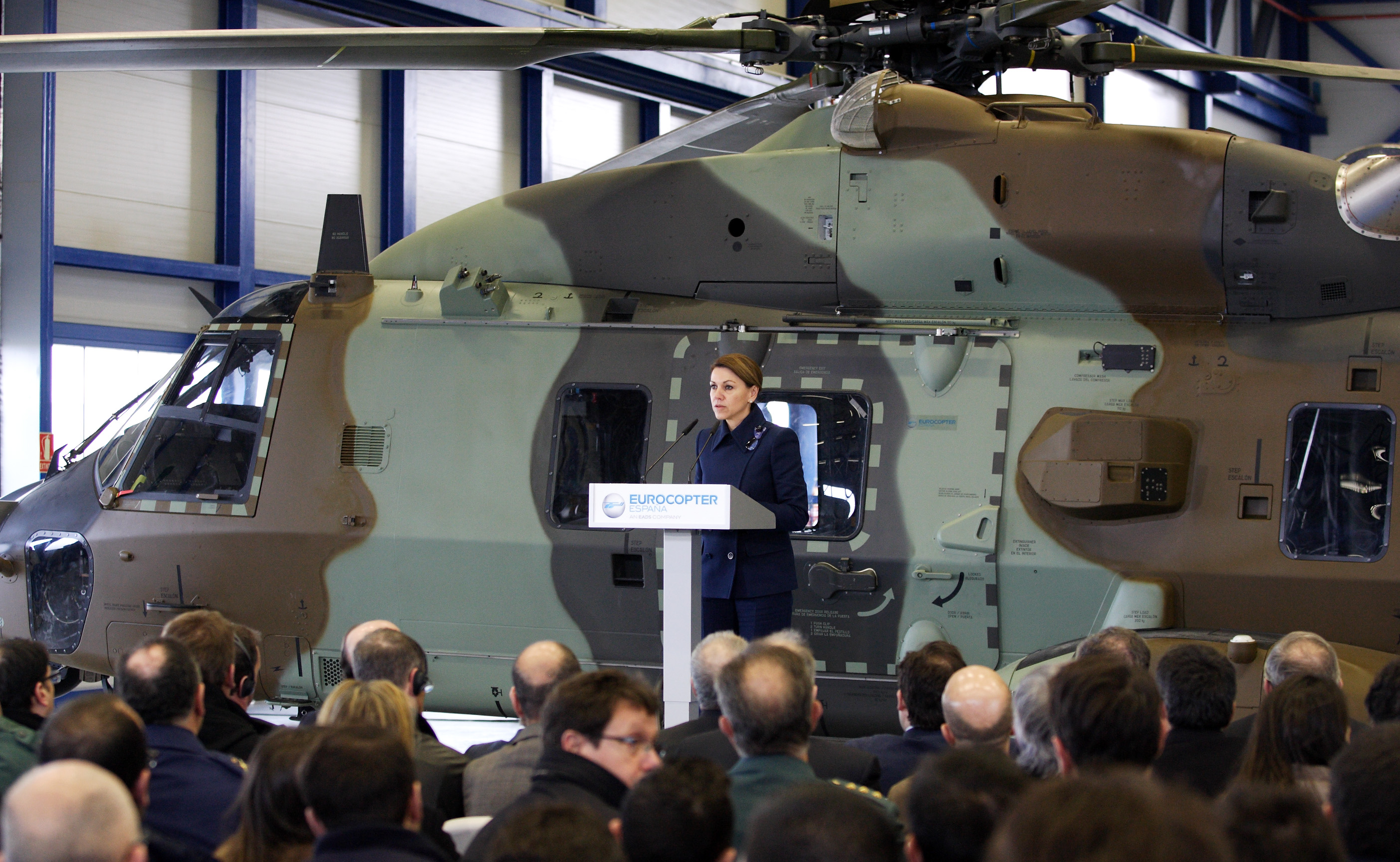
NH90 military helicopter assembled in Albacete

As throughout Spain in recent decades, the construction sector is one of the strongest. It employs 15.6 percent of the work force and produces 10.1 percent of regional GDP. It is one of the fastest-growing sectors of the economy: growth in 2006 was 13.6 percent. Most of the construction sector, is housing, including a new city of 30,000 inhabitants, Ciudad Valdeluz in Yebes, Guadalajara; 13,000 dwellings in Seseña, Toledo and the Reino de Don Quijote complex in the province of Ciudad Real, with 9,000 dwellings and 4,000 hotel beds.

As of 2019, the regional defence industry ranks third in Spain after those of Madrid and Andalusia, with a 5.8% share of sales. The bulk of the defence industry lies in cities such as Illescas, Toledo, Cedillo, Valdepeñas, Puertollano, Ciudad Real or Albacete. The Airbus Group is present in Illescas since 1992 and in Albacete (Airbus Helicopters) since 2005.

=== Energy ===
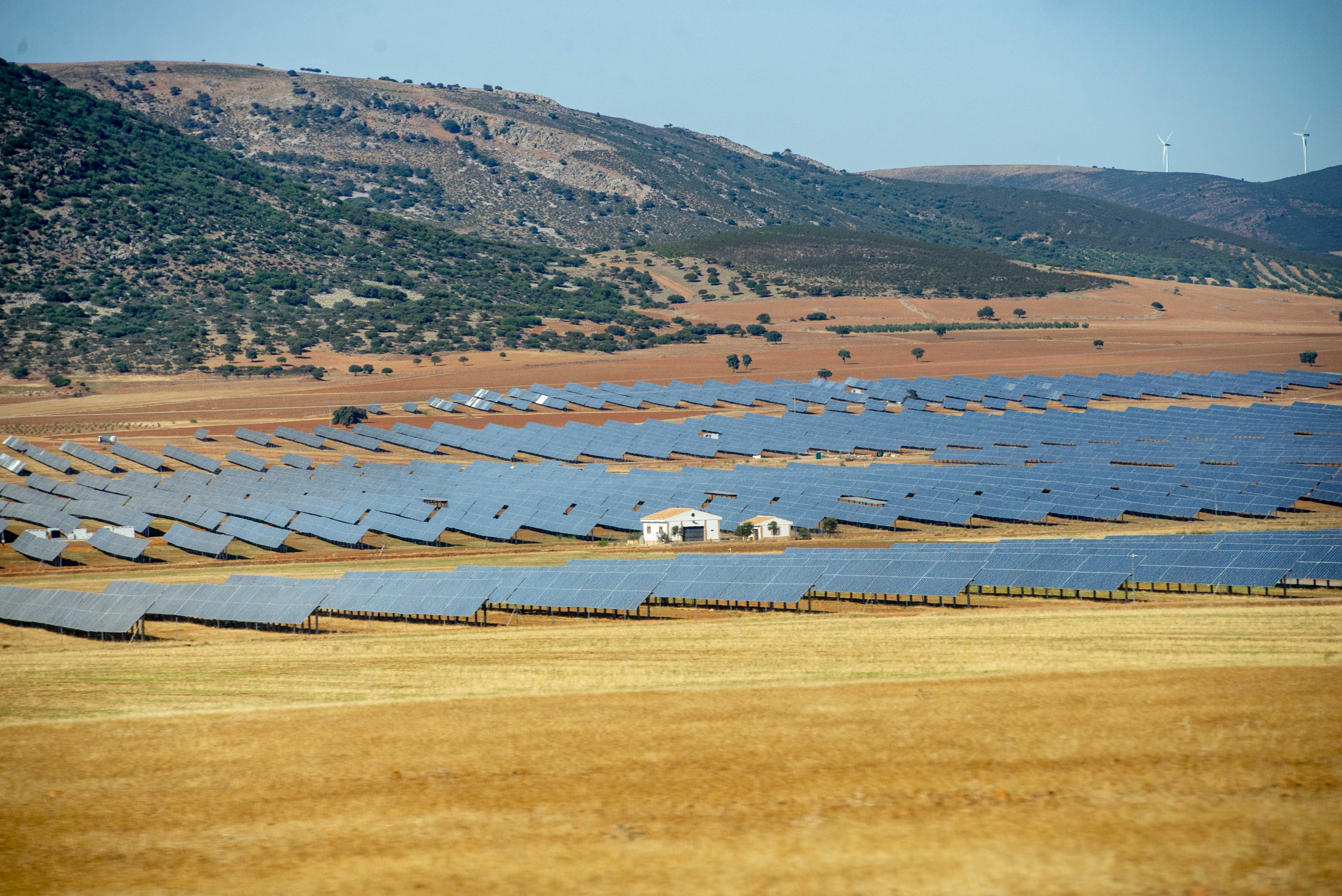
A photovoltaic power plant in Porzuna, in September 2019, part of the largest photovoltaic complex in the region: Picón I, Picón II and Picón III, designed with a peak power production of 150 MW

Although wind energy and solar energy have been playing increasingly important roles in Castilla–La Mancha, the majority of the energy generated in the region comes from the region's large thermal power stations: the Elcogas Thermal Power Station (owned by Elcogas) and Puertollano Thermal Power Station (owned by E.ON) in Puertollano as well as the Aceca Thermal Power Station in Villaseca de la Sagra (owned by Iberdrola and Unión Fenosa).

Castilla–La Mancha is also the home of the Trillo Nuclear Power Plant near Trillo, Guadalajara.

Existing solar thermal power plants (all using a parabolic trough collector) in the region include Manchasol-1 and Manchasol-2 in Alcázar de San Juan (49.9 and 50 MW respectively), Helios 1 and Helios 2 in Puerto Lápice (50 MW each), Ibersol Ciudad Real in Puertollano (50 MW).

Regarding photovoltaic power plants, Picón I, Picón II and Picón III (50 MW each), located in Porzuna, were put into operation in 2019.

=== Mining ===
The region is rich in mineral resources, particularly the south, and they have been exploited since Antiquity.

As of 2018, with 270 active mining sites (only one of them an underground mine), most of the extractive sector is dedicated to aggregates, clays, plasters and other mineral products, accounting for a 10.15% of active sites in Spain.

Recent mining projects brought forward by the regional government in the province of Ciudad Real, rich in a number of strategic minerals, include those of tungsten (in between Almodóvar del Campo and Abenójar), phosphates (in Fontanarejo), and titanium and zirconium (in between Puebla de Don Rodrigo and Arroba de los Montes), but their final authorisations pend on satisfactory environmental impact statements, and they have also met the opposition from environmental organisations.

=== Service sector ===
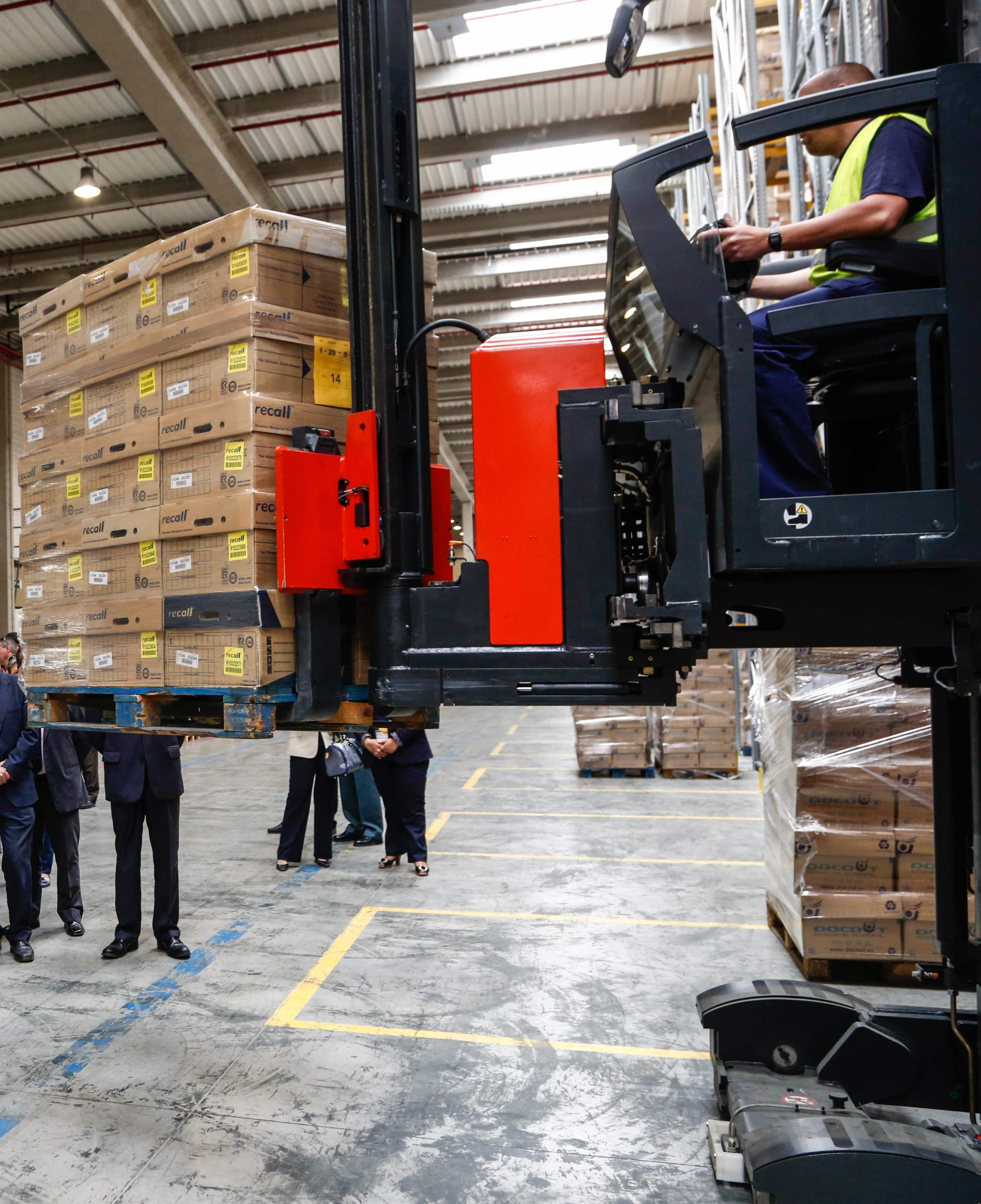
Work in a records management outsourcing company in Tarancón

The majority of the regional workforce—55.5 percent—is employed in the service sector, generating 49.8 percent of regional GDP, according to Economic and Social Council of Castilla–La Mancha (Consejo Económico y Social de Castilla–La Mancha, CES) data for 2006. Although a large sector of the regional economy, it is small by national standards: 67.2 percent of employment in Spain is in the service sector. Counted in the service sector are commerce, tourism, hospitality, finance, public administration, and administration of other services related to culture and leisure.

The Madrid's urban decongestion has favoured the development of logistics businesses and platforms in Azuqueca de Henares and Illescas, which neighbor the Madrid region.

In the area of tourism, there has been a great deal of growth, with Castilla–La Mancha becoming in recent decades one of the principal tourist destinations in the Spanish interior. During 2006 the region had more than 2 million tourists (3 percent more than the previous year) for a total of 3,500,000 overnight hotel stays. Rural tourism increased 14 percent in overnight stays in a single year. From 2000 to 2005 the number of hotel beds increased 26.4 percent to 17,245 beds in 254 hotels. In the same period, the number of casas rurales (for farm stays) increased 148 percent to 837 and the number of beds in such facilities 175 percent to 5,751.

== Health ==
The Servicio de Salud de Castilla–La Mancha (SESCAM, "Health Service of Castilla–La Mancha"), part of the Consejería de Salud y Bienestar Social ("Council of Health and Social Welfare") is the entity in charge of health in Castilla–La Mancha. It is an integral part of Spain's National Health System, based on universal coverage, equal access, and public financing.

For the purposes of healthcare provision, the region is divided in 8 health areas (Albacete, la Mancha Centro, Guadalajara, Ciudad Real, Cuenca, Talavera de la Reina, Toledo, and Puertollano). Those are further subdivided in basic health zones.

== Education ==
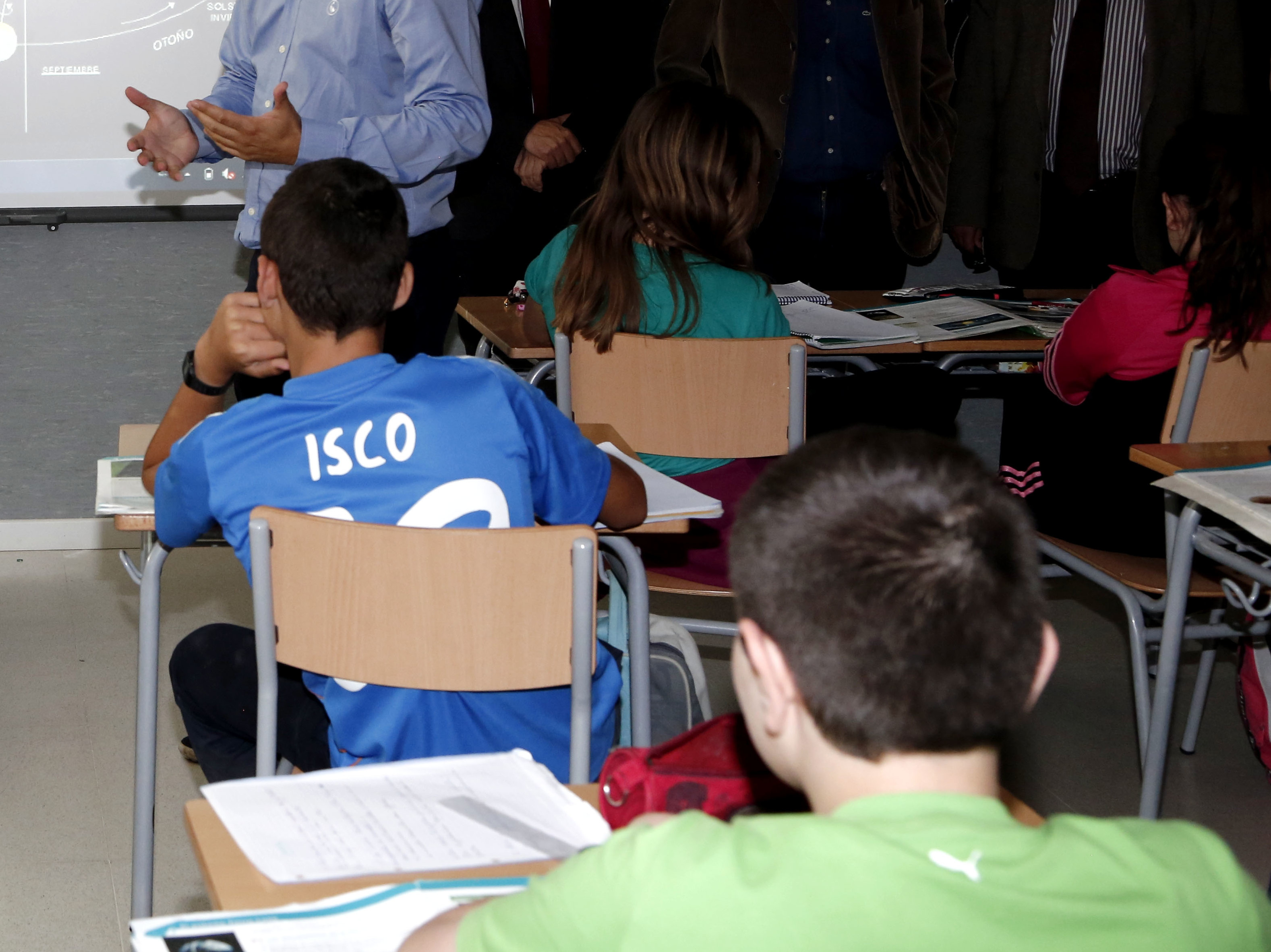
Students in a rural high school in the province of Cuenca

The Junta of Castilla–La Mancha assumed responsibility for education in the autonomous community as of January 1, 2000, directly managing over 1,000 schools, with 22,000 teachers and 318,000 students. In the 2006–2007 school year, the region had 324,904 students below the university level, of whom 17.7 percent were in private schools. In that same year, the region had 1,037 schools and 30,172 schoolteachers; 15.2 percent of the schools were private.

The decentralized University of Castilla–La Mancha was formally established in 1982 and has operated since 1985. There are four main campuses, one each at Albacete, Ciudad Real, Cuenca and Toledo, with classes also offered in Almadén, Talavera de la Reina and Puertollano. The university offers 54 degree programs (titulaciones). The province of Guadalajara stands outside the regional university, with its own University of Alcalá offering degrees in education, business, tourism, technical architecture, and nursing. The National University of Distance Education also offers services in the region through five affiliated centers, one in each province: Albacete (with an extension in Almansa), Valdepeñas, Cuenca, Guadalajara, and Talavera de la Reina. Finally, the Menéndez Pelayo International University has a location in Cuenca.

In the 2005–06 school year, the region had 30,632 students enrolled at universities, down 1.0 percent from the previous year.

Historically, the region has had other universities, but these no longer exist. The present University of Castilla–La Mancha uses one of the buildings of the Royal University of Toledo (1485–1807). Other former universities in the region were the Royal and Pontifical University of Our Lady of Rosario in Almagro (1550–1807) and the University of San Antonio de Porta Coeli in Sigüenza founded in the 15th century by Cardinal Pedro González de Mendoza and, like the others, closed in the Napoleonic era.

== Transport ==
=== Highways ===
Castilla–La Mancha has the most kilometers of autopistas (a type of limited access highway) and autovías dual carriageways, with a total of 2,790 kilometres (1,730 mi). The most heavily trafficked of these are the radial routes surrounding Madrid and the routes in and out of the city, but there are also routes within Castilla–La Mancha, and national and international routes that pass through the province, including highways in the International E-road network.

The regional government put into action a Plan Regional de Autovías with the objective that all municipalities with 10,000 or more inhabitants would be connected to an autovía. If it is completed, 96 percent of the region's population will live within 15 minutes of a high-capacity road. Among the developed projects of this plan are:

- Autovía de los Viñedos, 127 kilometres (79 mi) connecting Toledo and Tomelloso (completely in service).
- Autovía de la Sagra, 85 kilometres (53 mi) connecting the Autovía A-5 with the Autovía A-4 (Tranches I and II under way, duplication of highway CM-4001 in the tendering of works phase).
- Autovía del IV Centenario, 142 kilometres (88 mi) departs Ciudad Real to meet with the future Autovía Linares-Albacete (A-32), passing through Valdepeñas (first phase partially under way, second currently being studied).
- Autovía del Júcar, 130 kilometres (81 mi), will connect Albacete to Cuenca (in project).
- Autovía de la Alcarria: although initially contemplated in the Plan Regional de Autovías, the Ministry of Development has taken over the work. It will connect the Autovía del Este (Autovía A-4) with the Autovía del Nordeste (Autovía A-2) (currently being studied).

The red autonómica—the road network of the autonomous community—currently extends 7,900 kilometres (4,900 mi), of which 1,836 kilometres (1,141 mi) correspond to the basic network, 5,314 kilometres (3,302 mi) to the comarcal networks and 750 kilometres (470 mi) to local networks.

Autovías and autopistas in service
Name	From/to	Important cities in Castilla–La Mancha on route
Autovía del Nordeste	Madrid–Barcelona	Azuqueca de Henares, Guadalajara, Alcolea del Pinar
Autovía del Este	Madrid–Valencia	Tarancón, La Almarcha, Honrubia, Motilla del Palancar, Minglanilla
Autovía del Sur	Madrid–Cádiz	Ocaña, Madridejos, Manzanares, Valdepeñas
Autovía del Suroeste	Madrid–Badajoz	Talavera de la Reina, Oropesa
Autopista Radial R-2	Madrid–Guadalajara	Guadalajara
Autopista Radial R-4	Madrid–Ocaña	Seseña, Ocaña
Autovía de Murcia	Albacete–Cartagena	Albacete, Hellín
Autovía de Alicante	Atalaya del Cañavate–Alicante	Atalaya del Cañavate, Sisante, La Roda, Albacete, Almansa
Autovía Almansa-Játiva	Almansa–Játiva	Almansa
Autopista Ocaña–La Roda	Ocaña–La Roda	Ocaña, Corral de Almaguer, Quintanar de la Orden, Mota del Cuervo, Las Pedroñeras, San Clemente, La Roda
Autovía Ciudad Real–Puertollano	Ciudad Real–Puertollano	Argamasilla de Calatrava
Autopista Madrid-Córdoba	Madrid–Toledo	Toledo
Autovía de Toledo	Madrid–Toledo	Illescas, Toledo
Autovía de los Viñedos	Toledo–Tomelloso	Toledo, Mora, Consuegra, Madridejos, Alcázar de San Juan, Tomelloso

Autovías in autopistas projected or under construction
Name	From/to	Important cities in Castilla–La Mancha on route
Autovía de la Alcarria	Guadalajara–Tarancón	Guadalajara, Mondéjar, Tarancón
Autovía Linares-Albacete	Linares–Albacete	Albacete
Autovía de Castilla–La Mancha	Ávila–Cuenca	Torrijos, Toledo, Ocaña, Tarancón, Cuenca
Autovía Extremadura-Comunidad Valenciana	Mérida–Atalaya del Cañavate	Ciudad Real, Almadén, Daimiel, Manzanares, Argamasilla de Alba, Tomelloso, San Clemente, Villarrobledo
Autovía de la Sagra	A-5–A-4	Valmojado, Illescas, Borox, Añover de Tajo
Autovía de la Solana	Manzanares–La Solana	Manzanares, La Solana
Autovía del IV Centenario	Ciudad Real–Valdepeñas	Ciudad Real, Almagro, Valdepeñas
Autovía del Júcar	Albacete–Cuenca	Cuenca, Motilla del Palancar, Villanueva de la Jara, Quintanar del Rey, Tarazona de la Mancha, Madrigueras, Albacete
Autovía Transmanchega	Daimiel–Tarancón	Daimiel, Villarrubia de los Ojos, Alcázar de San Juan, Quintanar de la Orden, Villamayor de Santiago, Horcajo de Santiago, Tarancón
Ronda Suroeste de Toledo	CM-42–A-40	Burguillos de Toledo, Cobisa, Argés, Bargas
Ronda Este de Toledo	CM-42–A-40	Toledo

=== Railways ===
Renfe, Spain's state-owned railway operator operates numerous trains throughout Castilla–La Mancha.

==== Long distance ====
Numerous long-distance rail lines (líneas de largo recorrido) pass through Castilla–La Mancha, most of them radiating out of Madrid. Some of these are high-velocity trains (Alta Velocidad Española AVE):

High velocity AVE trains

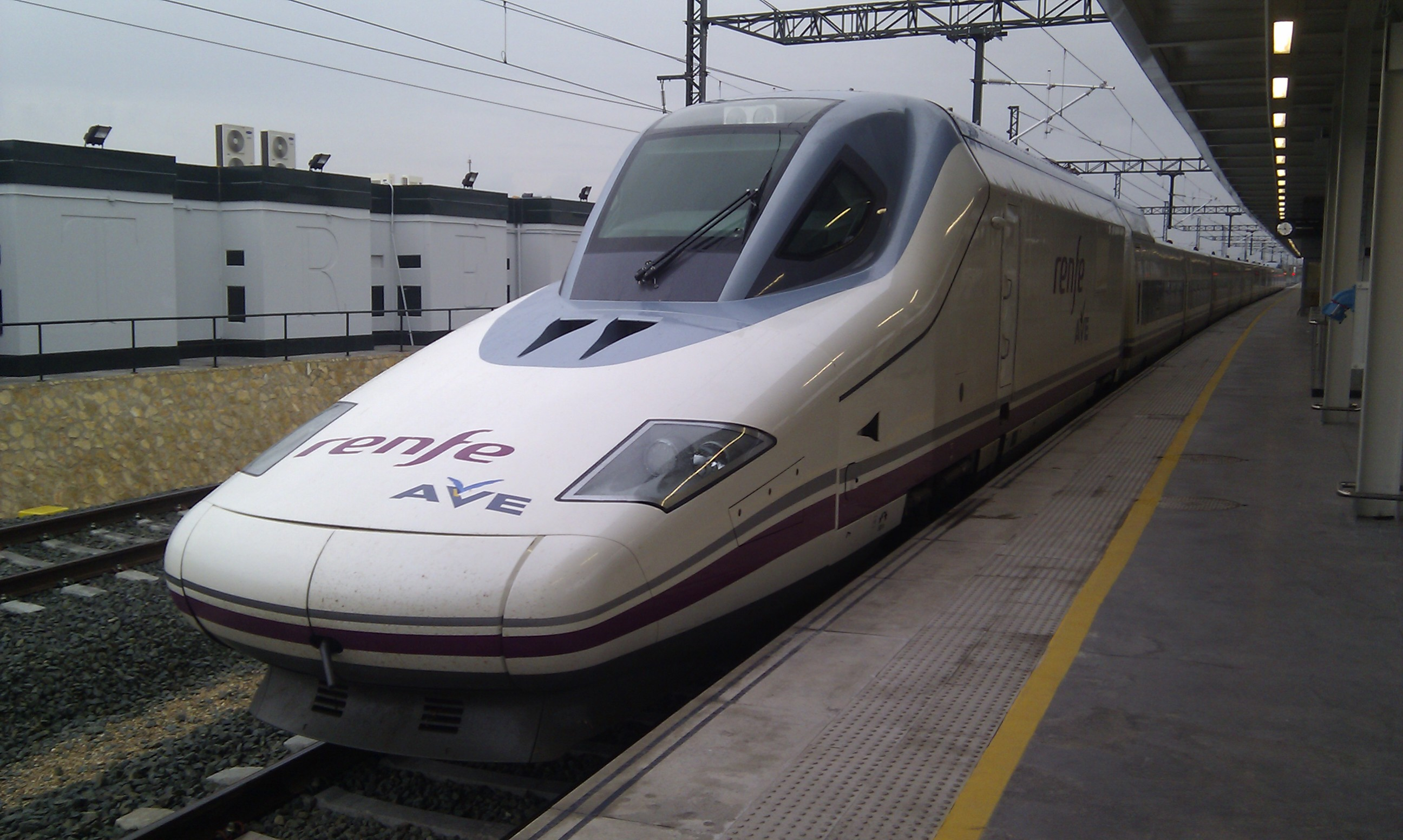
Renfe 112 series rolling stock in the Albacete-Los Llanos railway station

Rail network in Castilla–La Mancha, managed by the State-owned ADIF

- Madrid–Ciudad Real–Puertollano–Córdoba–Seville).
- Madrid–Toledo
- Madrid–Guadalajara–Zaragoza–Barcelona.
- Madrid–Cuenca–Albacete–Valencia (in project).
- Madrid–Toledo (La Sagra)–Talavera de la Reina–Navalmoral de la Mata–Plasencia–Fuentidueñas–Cáceres–Mérida–Badajoz–Lisbon (in project).

Normal Largo Recorrido trains

- Alicante–Albacete–Alcázar de San Juan–Ciudad Real
- Madrid–Ciudad Real–Jaén
- Madrid–Ciudad Real–Badajoz
- Madrid–Cuenca–Valencia
- Madrid–Guadalajara–Soria
- Madrid–Guadalajara–Arcos de Jalón
- Madrid–Talavera de la Reina–Badajoz

==== Local trains ====
Two local commuter rail lines out of Madrid (Cercanías Madrid) pass through Castilla–La Mancha. The C-2 line stops in Azuqueca de Henares in the province of Guadalajara and in the city of Guadalajara itself. The C-3 to Aranjuez used to stop at Seseña, but service to that station was discontinued in April 2007.

==== Airports ====
Air transport is marginal in the region. Castilla–La Mancha has two airports, the Albacete Airport (no cargo transport and with an insignificant civilian use) and the Ciudad Real Central Airport, which was affected by the 2008 crisis and closed in 2012, although efforts have been pursued to reactivate the latter. Relatively close airports outside the region include those in Madrid, Valencia and Alicante.

== See also ==
- Manchego cuisine
- List of municipalities in Albacete
- List of municipalities in Ciudad Real
- List of municipalities in Cuenca
- List of municipalities in Guadalajara
- List of municipalities in Toledo
