= El Cardoso de la Sierra =

El Cardoso de la Sierra, Spain
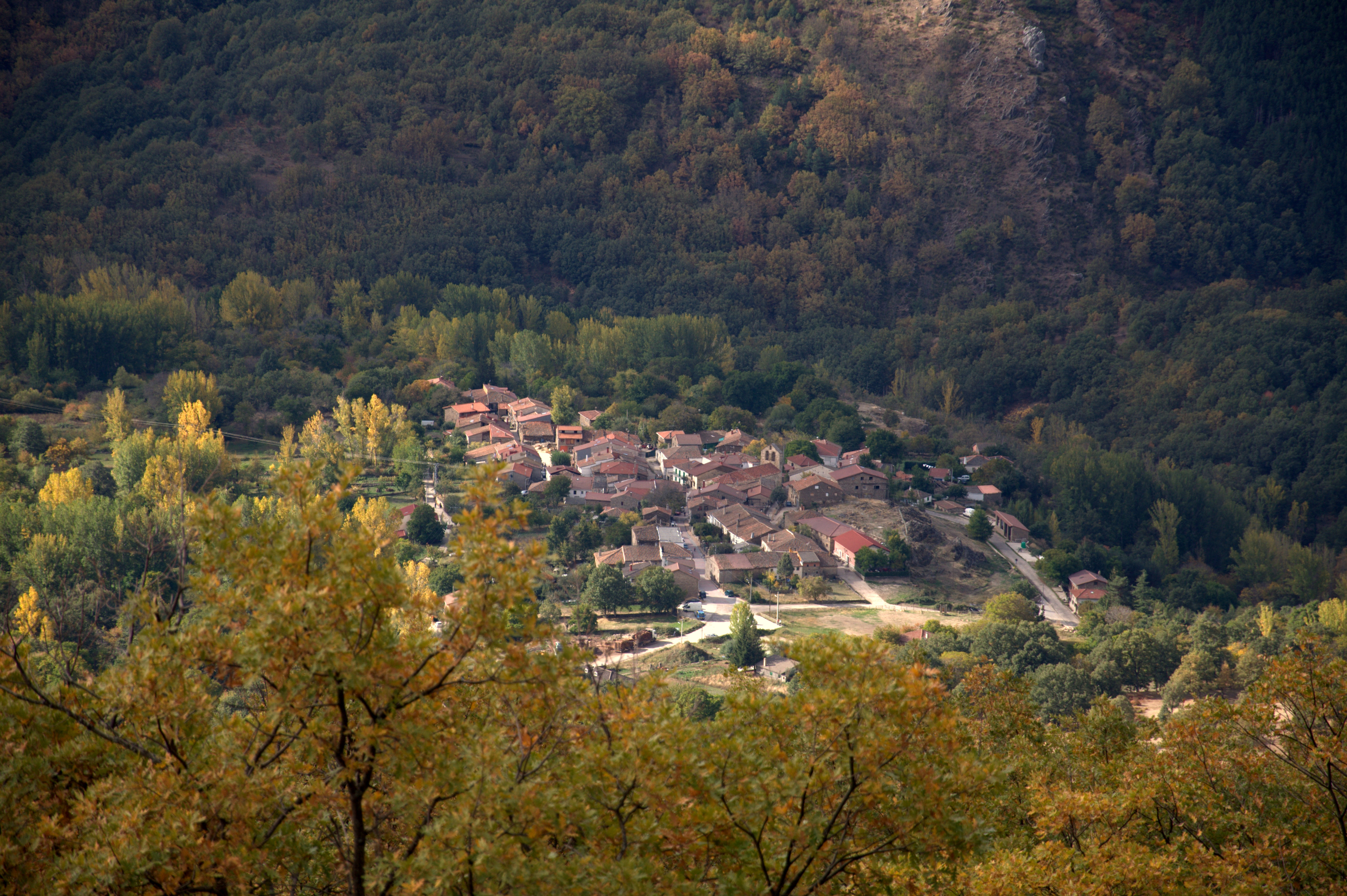
- View of El Cardoso de la Sierra.

- Location within Province of Guadalajara Location within Castilla-La Mancha Location within Spain
- Coordinates: 41°05′53″N 3°27′49″W
- Country: Spain
- Autonomous community: Castile-La Mancha
- Province: Guadalajara
- Municipality: El Cardoso de la Sierra

Area
  - Total: 186.87 km^{2} (72.15 sq mi)
- Elevation: 1,268 m (4,160 ft)

Population (2025-01-01)
  - Total: 49
  - Density: 0.26/km^{2} (0.68/sq mi)
- Time zone: UTC+1 (CET)
  - Summer (DST): UTC+2 (CEST)

El Cardoso de la Sierra is a municipality located in the province of Guadalajara, Castile-La Mancha, Spain. According to the 2004 census (INE), the municipality had a population of 75 inhabitants.

It is not known when the village of El Cardoso was founded, although its existence is attested from the 9th century, when Buitrago del Lozoya fell into Christian hands and they began to repopulate the Sierra de Ayllón. In the 11th century, El Cardoso, El Vado, and Colmenar de la Sierra were included in the Ochavo de la Sierra of the Community of Villa and Land of Sepúlveda.
