= Autovía de los Viñedos =

Motorway in Spain

The Autovía de los Viñedos is a motorway in Spain. It passes through the region of Castile-La Mancha.
