= Campos de Hellín =

Coordinates: 38°37′36″N 1°31′39″W

Campos de Hellín is a comarca of the Province of Albacete, Spain.
