= Autovía de la Alcarria =

Planned autovia in Spain

Autovía de la Alcarria will be a dual carriageway in Spain that will connect Guadalajara and Tarancón.
