= Valdeavero =

Coordinates: 40°38′N 3°20′W

- Municipality
- Coat of arms

- Municipal location within the Community of Madrid.
- Country: Spain
- Autonomous community: Community of Madrid

Area
  - Total: 7.25 sq mi (18.79 km^{2})
- Elevation: 2,349 ft (716 m)

Population (2025-01-01)
  - Total: 1,896
  - Density: 261.3/sq mi (100.9/km^{2})
- Time zone: UTC+1 (CET)
  - Summer (DST): UTC+2 (CEST)

Valdeavero is a municipality of the Community of Madrid, Spain.
