= Ciudad Real International Airport =

Airport in Castilla–La Mancha, Spain

Ciudad Real International Airport Aeropuerto Internacional de Ciudad Real
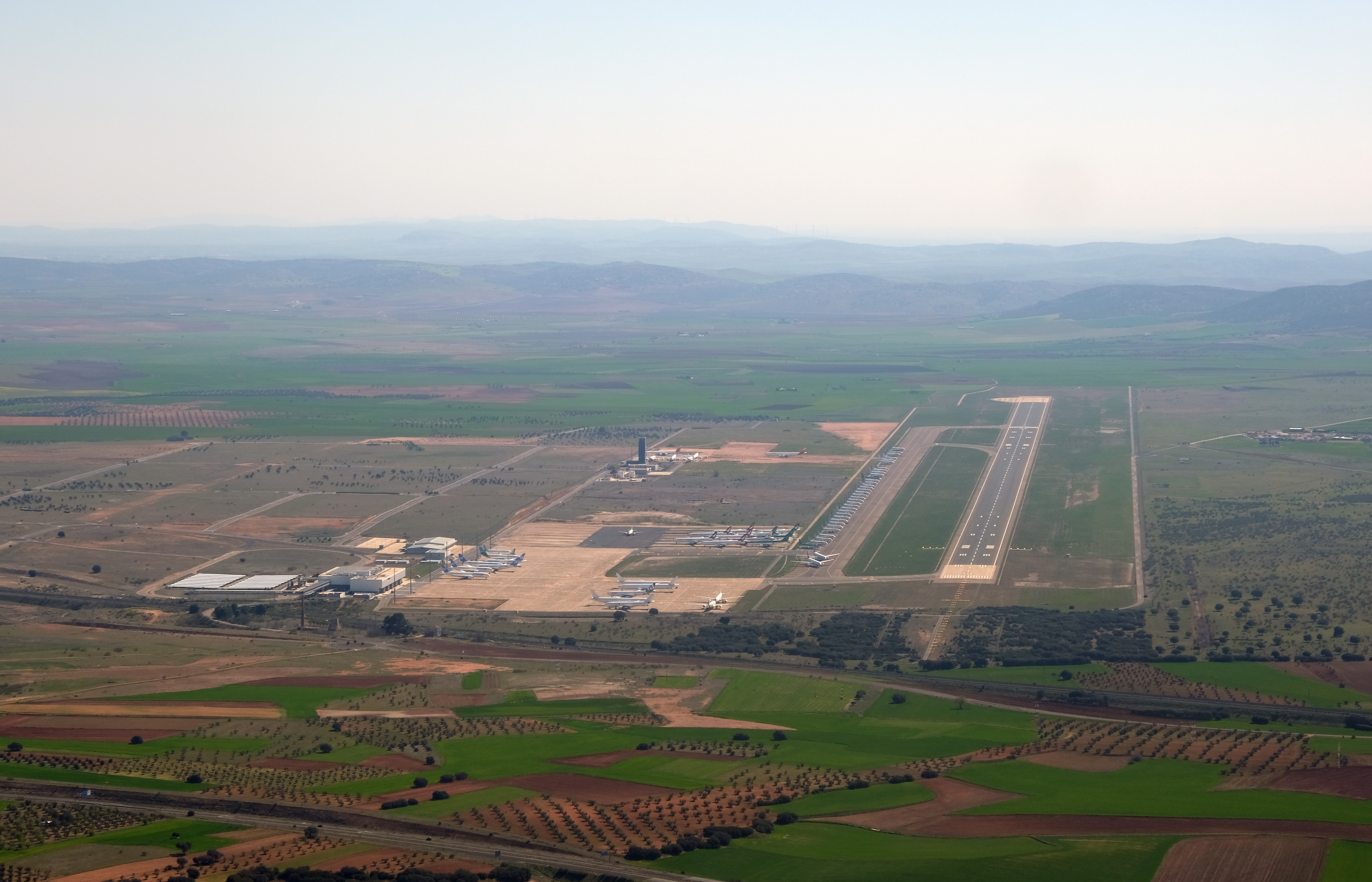
- IATA: CQM; ICAO: LERL; LID: CQM

Summary
- Airport type: Private
- Operator: CRIA
- Serves: Ciudad Real and Puertollano
- Location: Ciudad Real, Ballesteros de Calatrava and Villar del Pozo (Province of Ciudad Real, Spain)
- Elevation AMSL: 646 m (2,119 ft)
- Coordinates: 38°51′23″N 003°58′12″W

Map
- Location in Spain

Runways
Direction	Length		Surface
Direction	m	ft	Surface
10/28	4,100	13,450	Asphalt

Ciudad Real International Airport or CRIA (IATA: CQM, ICAO: LERL), previously known as Central Airport CR, Don Quijote Airport and South Madrid Airport, is an international airport and long-storage facility situated south of Ciudad Real in Spain. Constructed at a cost of €1.1 billion, it was opened in 2009, when it became the first private international airport in Spain.

Operations at the site ran for three years until April 2012, when its previous management company filed for bankruptcy and went into receivership, after the last flight operator, low-cost airline Vueling, withdrew its last route from the airport. It remained closed for seven years until reopening in September 2019, however without any scheduled passenger traffic.

== Facilities ==
The airport features a single runway, 4,100 m (13,500 ft) long and 60 m (200 ft) wide, making it one of the longest in Europe. Its design was to enable the airport to accept all forms of commercial airliners, including the Airbus A380. The passenger terminal was designed so that it could process two million passengers a year, as well as a maximum of ten million passengers a year if additional modules were added, while its cargo facilities were designed to handle a maximum of 47,000 tonnes a year. One part of the airport was designed with facilities to cater for private flights and sport flights. The airport is linked by road to the A-41 motorway.

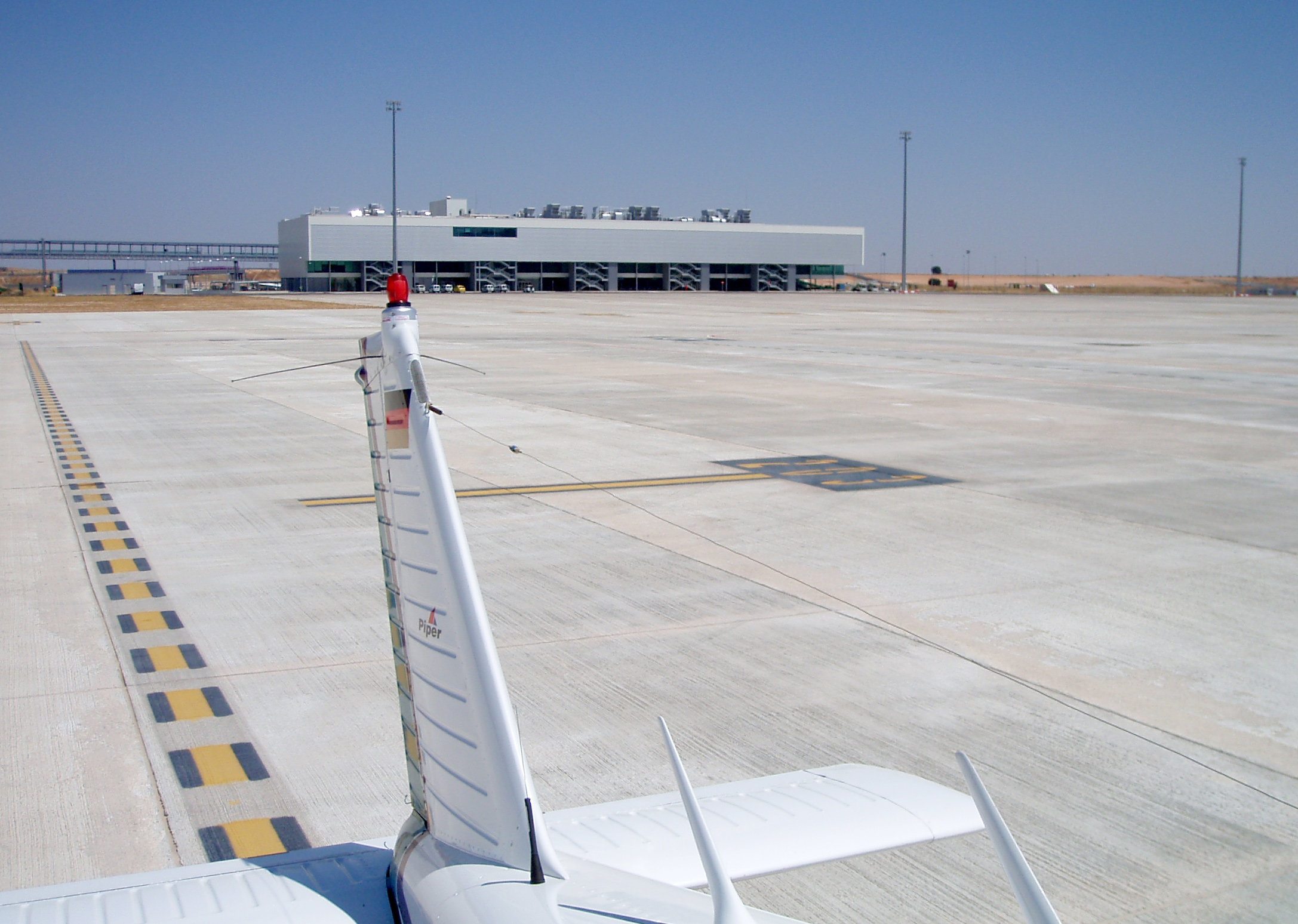
Terminal building

As part of its planned expansion, the airport was to feature a maintenance area, a heliport and an industrial zone of over 8 km^{2} (3 sq mi). In addition, a 300 m (980 ft) long foot bridge was built to connect the terminal to the nearby Madrid–Seville high-speed rail line, towards a site for a railway station; construction of this transportation link was never started, though had such a project been undertaken and completed, it would have made Ciudad Real Airport the first in Spain to be linked to the AVE rail network, with travel times to the closest cities (Madrid and Córdoba) of 50–60 minutes.

== History ==
=== Operations (2008–2012) ===
Following its opening in 2009, the airport's first flights were to Palma de Mallorca, run by Air Berlin until it discontinued this service on 30 May 2010. Air Nostrum also operated flights to Barcelona, Gran Canaria, and briefly to Lanzarote.

Ciudad Real Airport began handling international flights in June 2010, with its first international service launched by Ryanair. The airline service ran three flights per week from London Stansted, until its discontinuation on 11 November that year, having flown approximately 22,000 passengers into or from the airport. The cancellation of the route, which resulted in the loss of 22 jobs, was the result of a breakdown in trade agreements with Ryanair, and financial difficulties being faced by the airport. Spanish low-cost carrier Vueling became the only airline serving the airport at this point, running flights to Barcelona, Paris and Palma de Mallorca, until it eventually ended services on 29 October 2011.

By 2012, the airport's financial difficulties forced the management company to file for bankruptcy, after accumulating more than €300 million of debt, eventually going into receivership. By 13 April 2012, all airport operations were shut down, and would remain so for more than 7 years.

=== Reasons for bankruptcy ===
Much of the fault behind the closure of Ciudad Real Airport lay within the following factors. The first factor was centered around the poor planning of its construction. During the early planning stages, some deficiencies were overlooked. The main one was its location in a Bird Special Protection Area (SPA) and in the middle of the inactive Campo de Calatrava Volcanic Field, with the European Union blocking its construction until environmental protection measures had been taken (moving a portion of the protected area and downsizing the airport facilities). This delayed the initial opening for four years (2008 instead of 2004).

Meanwhile, in 2006 the main airport of Madrid (Barajas) finished work on an expansion that allowed it to handle 70 million passengers a year, relieving the previously over-saturated facilities. Consequently, all the airlines that had been considering operating from Ciudad Real, chose instead to fly from Madrid, a more convenient option for passengers from the capital, as the distance between Ciudad Real airport and Madrid is approximately 200 km (120 mi), effectively making road journeys to the airport over two hours long.

Had construction of a station on the Madrid–Seville high-speed rail line been made, as had been originally planned, journey times to the airport would have been more reasonable – at present, travel times from Madrid to Ciudad Real by train stand at around fifty minutes. But before bankruptcy, only the bridge that would connect the station to the terminal was built. There is also a disused railway station in the vicinity of the airport (Cañada de Calatrava station), but it only provides access to the conventional railway, not to the high-speed one.

Finally, the period when the airport first operated coincided with the worst years of the financial crisis in Spain, that resulted in a decrease of traffic in all Spanish airports, with passenger traffic at Ciudad Real airport measured within the low thousands. In addition, its main shareholder Caja Castilla-La Mancha (a regional savings bank) was the first Spanish bank to be bailed-out during the crisis, due to their investments in the Airport, and in several building companies, both small local ones and some big ones such as Colonial, which failed due to the housing bubble burst.

Other sources point to overoptimism in passenger numbers, while a BBC News magazine report published suggestions that the airport's investors had intended for the airport to fail; all had benefited from construction contracts awarded to their own companies.

=== On receivership ===
On 9 December 2013, having been considered to be a significant contributor towards the financial trouble of the creditor institutions and the Castilla-La Mancha Regional Government, Ciudad Real Airport was put up for auction with a minimum asking price of €100 million. No offers were made, and so extensions were made to the sale period over time, with the Commercial Court of Ciudad Real agreeing a 7th extension to the sale deadline on 27 July 2014, but with the asking price reduced to €80 million by this time.

On 17 July 2015, Chinese investment company Tzaneen International put forward a bid of €10,000 to buy the airport, stating that their intention was to invest an additional €100 million towards redeveloping the airport towards becoming a European hub for Chinese cargo shipments. However, the Commercial Court rejected the bid on the grounds that the offer was too low, and that the terminal building and the car parks would not have been included in the deal. In September 2015, an unidentified UK group made an offer to the court of €28 million for the airport, though complications led the sale to fall through.

=== Sale and operations (2019–onwards) ===
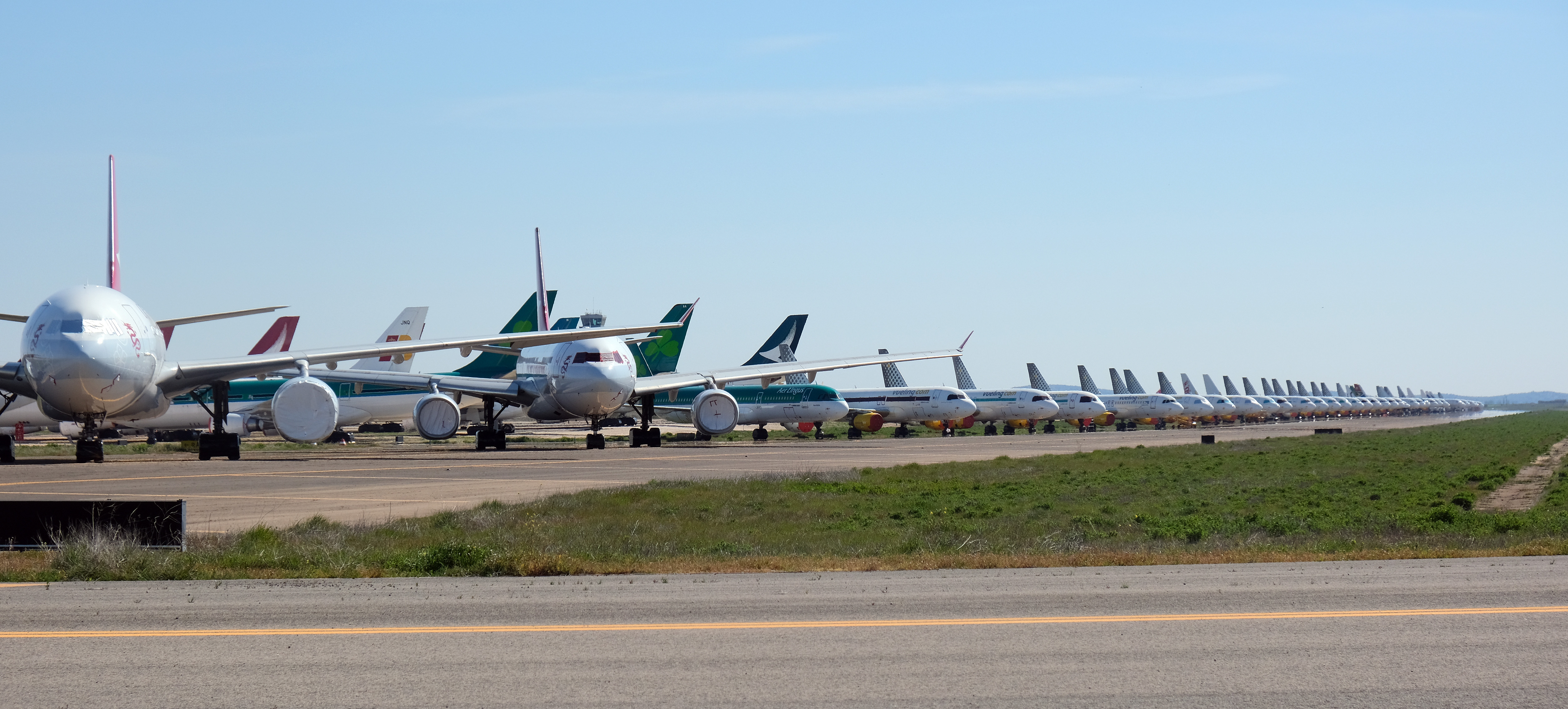
Airplanes parking at the facilities due to pandemic.

The airport was sold in April 2016 to the new company CRIA (CR International Airport SL). Due to financial and bureaucratic difficulties, the sale was not finalized until 2018. The airport was finally reopened on 12 September 2019, and in October 2019 the Irish company Direct Aero Services opened a maintenance base. Spanish firm Jet Aircraft Services (JAS) also opened an aircraft dismantling base in December 2019.

The airport has also had some general aviation movements since the reopening, while commercial passenger flights are not expected in the near future.

In May 2020, cargo flights returned to the airport, as part of a Guangzhou–Ciudad Real cargo corridor to bring medical equipment during the COVID-19 pandemic and the passenger airline based at the airport, Galistair, arrived, but left later that year to Granada.

That same month, the first airplanes parking at the facilities due to that pandemic arrived for storage. By August 2020 it was already hosting around 60 airplanes, from Vueling, Iberia, South African, Aer Lingus or Virgin Atlantic, and was planning to expand to host around 200 by the end of the year. Even if the expansion did not take place, the airport hosted around 80 airplanes at the peak of the pandemic, becoming one of the preferred locations in Europe for temporary storage. However, by July 2021 half of the aircraft were put back into operation by their respective airlines, and the airport closed its doors temporarily as it had defaulted on its payments to several suppliers. The issue was resolved temporarily in a week, with a permanent solution found in 2022. A similar problem arose in 2023 with the ATC supplier, but has also been solved.

== Ground transportation ==
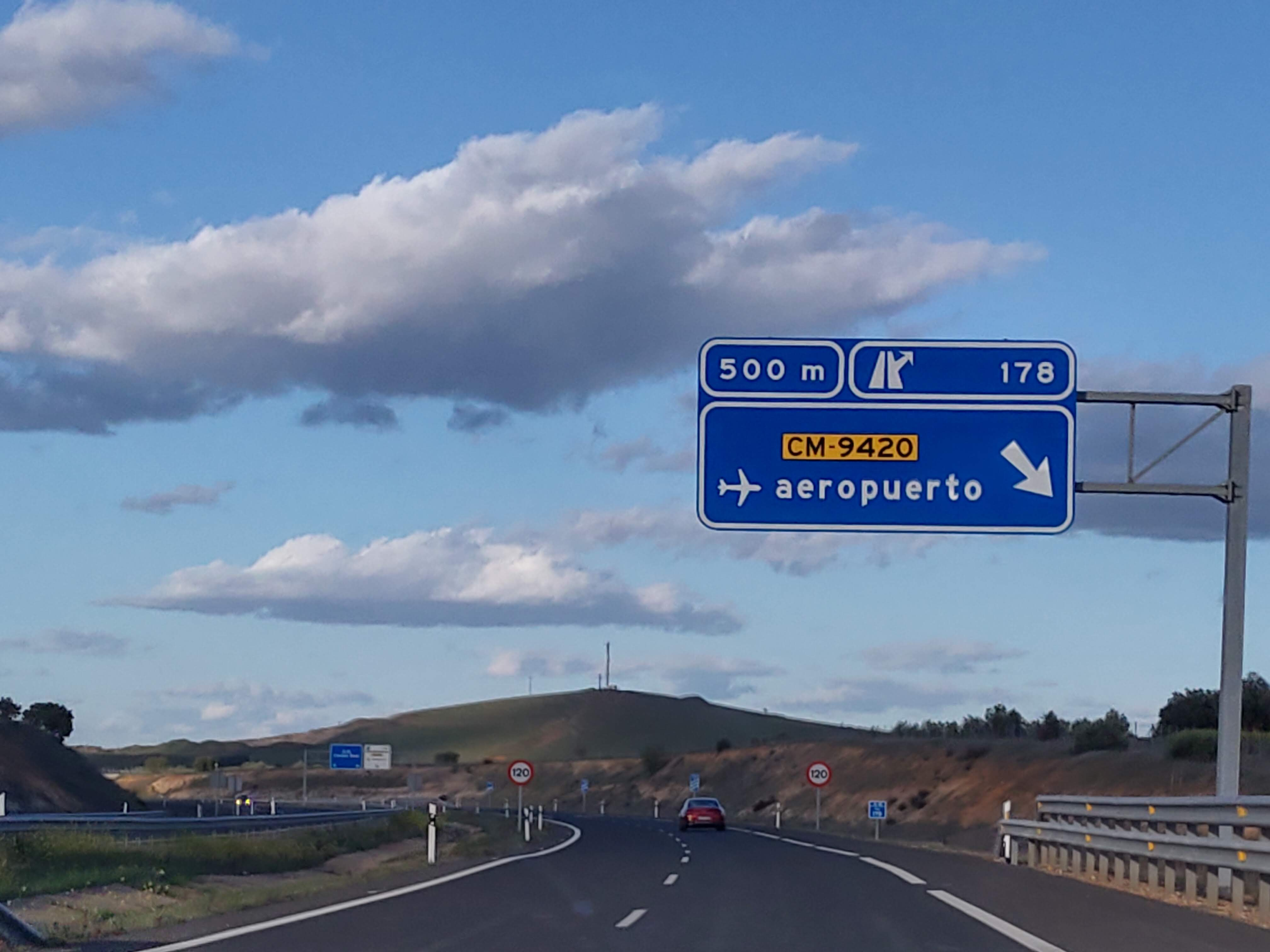
Motorway exit to the airport

=== Road ===
The airport is located next to the A-41 motorway (exit 178), that currently connects Ciudad Real and Puertollano, but was originally planned as a Madrid-Córdoba alternate route. It also provides direct motorway connections to Valencia (using A-43 and E-901 A-3 ), Alicante (using A-43 and A-31 ) and Murcia (using A-43 , A-31 and A-30 ). Madrid can be reached either using N-401 (converted from Toledo to A-42 ) or using A-43 , CM-420 and E-5 A-4 .

Motorway A-43 , currently finishing at Ciudad Real, is projected to be extended to Badajoz (permitting direct connections to Lisbon) either from Ciudad Real or from Puertollano.

Other routes serving the airport are N-420 (Córdoba to Tarragona via Cuenca and Teruel), N-430 (Badajoz to Valencia via Albacete) and N-401 (Madrid to Ciudad Real via Toledo). Local road CM-4111 links the airport to the E-5 A-4 south, for Jaén, Granada and Almería.

=== Bus and coach ===
During the first period of operation (2008-2012), Aisa buses connected the airport to Ciudad Real and to Puertollano.

As of 2024, the only service stopping at the airport is the Toledo-Ciudad Real-Granada coach service by ALSA. However, travel between Toledo or Ciudad Real and the Airport is not permitted due to traffic rights, and only travel between Toledo and Granada, Ciudad Real and Granada or the Airport and Granada is permitted.

=== Rail ===
The airport is located next to the Ciudad Real-Badajoz rail line and Madrid-Sevilla/Málaga high speed railway. Despite plans to build a station on the latter, the airport only has a station on the former, called Cañada de Calatrava, and that served that village until 1992-93. Only one train per day passes through the station, but currently without stopping.

More frequent train services are available from the nearby stations at Ciudad Real and Puertollano:

- Madrid can be reached in 1h from Ciudad Real using frequent High Speed trains or 2h48 using the daily regional service.
- Córdoba can be reached in 45–55 minutes from Puertollano using High Speed trains.
- Alicante can be reached in about 4h using the two daily regional services from Ciudad Real.
- Valencia can be reached in about 2h35 using direct High Speed services, or in 5h using the weekly regional service from Ciudad Real.
- Mérida can be reached in about 3h20 using the two daily services from Puertollano. Badajoz, on the same line, can be reached in over 4h, and connections from Badajoz to Lisbon and Porto via Entroncamento are available with Portuguese railway company CP.

== Media ==
Before opening and after closure, the airport has been used in a number media ventures:

- In 2012, Spanish film director Pedro Almodóvar used the airport to film a number of portions for his film I'm So Excited!. Almodóvar is himself a native of nearby Calzada de Calatrava, only 35 minutes away from the airport.
- In 2013, Volvo Trucks used the disused runway to film the "Epic Split" commercial. The scene features actor Jean-Claude Van Damme narrating and performing the splits between two moving trucks driving in reverse. Planning for the stunt involved the use of professionals to drive the trucks, with filming done within one take and directed by Andreas Nilsson.
- On 14 July 2013, Top Gear aired a special feature film for the third episode of its 20th series, filmed earlier that year, in which presenters Jeremy Clarkson, James May and Richard Hammond visited the disused airport during a "budget" supercar challenge in Spain. The presenters took time to explore the empty terminal building, before racing their cars – a McLaren 12C, Audi R8 and Ferrari 458 – on the closed runway.
- In 2019, Canadian airline WestJet aired a commercial that was filmed in the airport.
