= Autovía A-32 =

Road in Spain

Autovía A-32
- Autovía Linares-Albacete
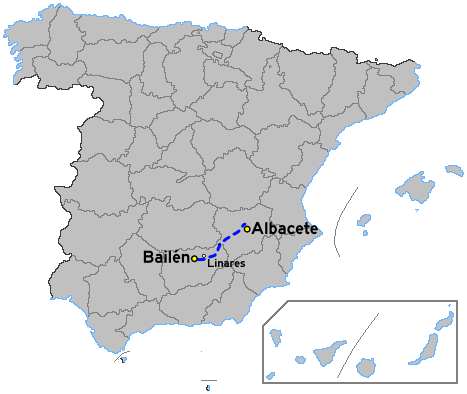

Major junctions
- From: Albacete
- To: Bailén

Location
- Country: Spain

Highway system
- Highways in Spain; Autopistas and autovías; National Roads

The Autovía A-32, also known as the Autovía de Levante, is a highway in Spain.

It has been re-numbered from the N-332,N-330 and N-430. It connects Jaén with Albacete where it joins the Autovía A-30.

The majority of the Autovia A-32 is planned as an upgrade of the N-322.

The road will commence at Bailén at the Autovía A-44 and Autovía A-4. The road heads east to Linares through olive covered hills. After 31 km the road reaches Úbeda with a junction with the Autovía A-316.

Thereafter the road heads north east to Vilanueva and the Santuario de Notra Sant de la Fuensanta. It then follows the Rio Guadalimar to the west of the Sierra de Cazorla and then the Sierra de Alcaraz before crossing the Puerto de los Pocicos (1,058 m). It then heads along the Rio del Jardin to Albacete and junctions with the Autovía A-31, Autovía A-30, and N-430.

The road heads north east across the Rio Jucar and then the Rio Cabriol before passing over the southern slopes of the Sierra Martés before meeting the N-330 and Autovía A-3.
