= N-430 road (Spain) =

Road in Spain

National road N-430
- Carretera nacional N-430
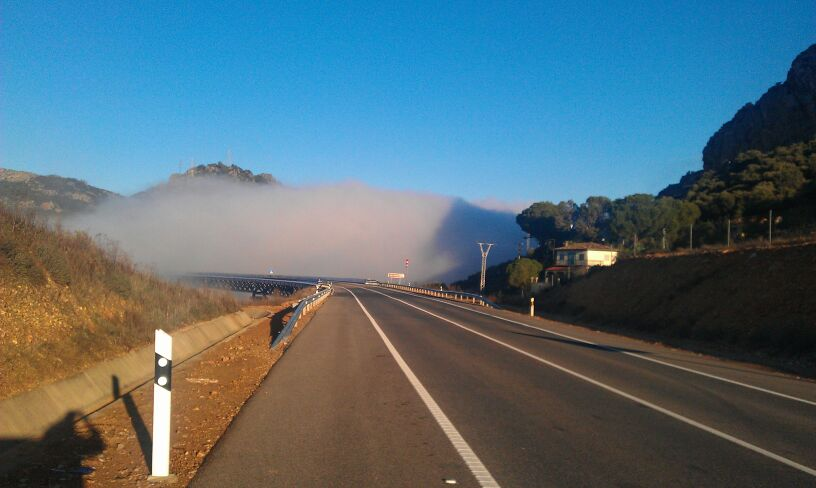
- N-430 to cross the Guadiana river.

Route information
- Part of E903

Major junctions
- From: Badajoz
- To: Valencia

Location
- Country: Spain

Highway system
- Highways in Spain; Autopistas and autovías; National Roads

The N-430 is a highway in central Spain.

== Route ==
The road starts in Badajoz, Spain in the "San Roque Bridge" and follows the Guadiana River. In the Sierra de la Chimenea the road crosses the Orellana Dam and further east the Garcia de Sola Dam and then passes over the Puerto de los Carneros (520m) mountain pass. The road then follows the Rio Guadiana again to Ciudad Real. Here there is a junction with N-420, N-401 and Autovía A-43. The N-430 passes through Manzanares and over the Autovía A-4.

The road then follows east to the Sierra de Alhambra and into the wooded Campo de Montiel and the Lagunas de Ruidera. The road passes close to Maripérez (909m) before dropping down into Albacete where the road ends with junctions onto the Autovía A-31, Autovía A-30 and Autovía A-32/N-322.
