= N-403 road (Spain) =

National road N-403
- Carretera nacional N-403

Major junctions
- From: Toledo
- To: Autopista AP-6

Location
- Country: Spain

Highway system
- Highways in Spain; Autopistas and autovías; National Roads

The N-403 heads north from Toledo in Spain. It has a junction with the Autovía A-42 and N-401 and N-400.

The road heads north over the Rio Guadarrama to Maqueda where it crosses the Autovía A-5 junction 74. It is being upgraded to the Autovía A-40.

The N-403 heads north over the Montes de Alamin and the Rio Alberche and into the Sierra de Gredos. The road passes the Embalse del Burguillo and the Puerto de la Paramera (1,395m). It the falls into the Adaja Valley and Ávila. Here there is a junction with the N-501 and N-110. The N-403 heads 37 km to junction 112 km of the Autopista AP-6, N-VI and N-601.
