= Autovía A-92M =

Highway in Andalusia, Spain

Autovía A-92M
- Autovía de Estación de Salinas a Villanueva de Cauche

Route information
- Maintained by Junta de Andalucía
- Length: 25.87 km (16.07 mi)
- Existed: 1996–present

Major junctions
- From: A-92 near Archidona
- A-7200, A-7203
- To: A-45 near Antequera

Location
- Country: Spain
- Provinces: Málaga

Highway system
- Highways in Spain; Autopistas and autovías; National Roads

The Autovía A-92M, officially the Autovía de Estación de Salinas a Villanueva de Cauche, is an autovía in the Province of Málaga, Andalusia, Spain. Part of the regional road network of the Junta de Andalucía, it runs 25.87 kilometres (16.07 mi) from the Autovía A-92 at Estación de Salinas, east of Archidona, to the Autovía A-45 at the Puerto de las Pedrizas, near Antequera. It gives traffic between Granada and Málaga a shorter route that bypasses Antequera, and the "M" in its designation stands for Málaga.

== Route ==
The road lies entirely within the Province of Málaga. From its junction with the A-92 at Estación de Salinas it runs south-west past Villanueva del Trabuco and Villanueva del Rosario to meet the A-45 at the Puerto de las Pedrizas, near Villanueva de Cauche. It is a dual carriageway, with two lanes in each direction.

== History ==
The autovía was built as the dualling (desdoblamiento) of the former N-321 national road between the Puerto de las Pedrizas and Salinas. Work began in July 1994, after a delay tied to the caso Ollero, a corruption case over the alleged payment of commissions by the contractor Ocisa for the award of the Salinas–Las Pedrizas works. The road opened in February 1996, completing a continuous motorway link between Granada and Málaga by that August. It was given the A-92M number in the Andalusian road catalogue of the mid-2000s, which assigned new designations to several roads of the regional Red Básica Estructurante.

== See also ==
- Highways in Spain
