= Autovía A-318 =

Andalusian regional motorway and road from Estepa to Luque (Spain)

The A-318 is a regional road in Andalusia. It is 72.5 kilometres (45.0 mi) long and goes from Estepa, Seville to the N-432 (Granada-Badajoz via Cordoba), a few kilometers from the town of Luque, Córdoba.

== Itinerary ==
(from west to east)

A-92 Estepa
Herrera
Puente Genil
Lucena
Cabra
Doña Mencía
N-432 especially between Baena and Luque.

== History ==
In the past, the A-318 only corresponded to the route from Cabra to the N-432. The route between Estepa and Cabra was part of the old A-340 Estepa-Guadix road.
