= N-322 road (Spain) =

National route of Spain

National road N-322
- Carretera nacional N-322
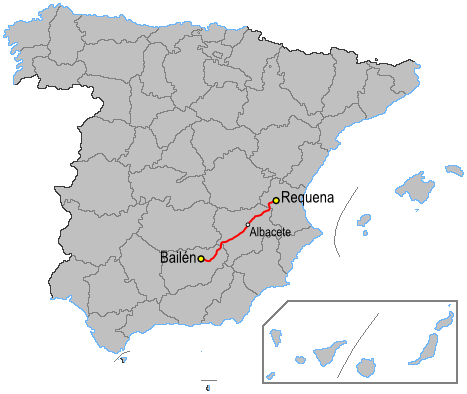

Route information
- Length: 321 km (199 mi)

Major junctions
- From: Bailén
- To: Requena

Location
- Country: Spain

Highway system
- Highways in Spain; Autopistas and autovías; National Roads

The N-322 is a highway in south east Spain.

The road starts at the Autovía A-32, 3 km east of its junction with the Autovía A-4 at Linares. The road heads east past the Etang de Giribaile and north of the town of Úbeda. The road then turns north east along the eastern flank of the Sierra de Cazorla and past the waterfalls of Garganta on the River Guadalquivir past the Etang de Guadalmena after which it leaves Andalucia.

The road follows the Rio Guadalmeria through the Sierra de Alcaraz before heading north east to Albacete where the road has been upgraded to the A-32 as a by-pass. The road crosses the Autovía A-31.

The N-322 heads north across the valley of the Jũcar and then at Mahora the road turns north east. The road is now at 700 m elevation. The road then passes into the Province of Valencia passing over the Riu Cabriol and through heavily wooded countryside to Requena. Here the road meets the Autovía A-3 and the N-320.
