= Autovía A-43 =

Autovía in south-central Spain

Autovía A-43
- Autovía Extremadura - Comunidad Valenciana
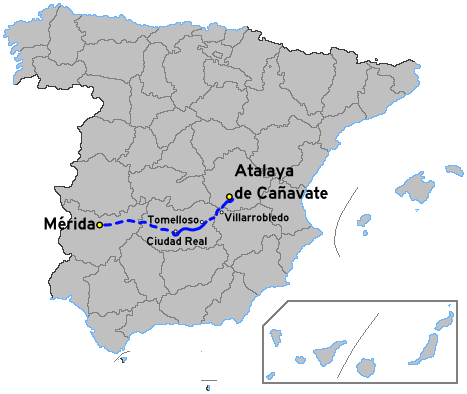

Route information
- Part of E903
- Length: 173 km (107 mi)

Major junctions
- From: Ciudad Real
- To: Atalaya del Cañavate

Location
- Country: Spain

Highway system
- Highways in Spain; Autopistas and autovías; National Roads

The Autovía A-43 (also known as Autovía Extremadura - Comunidad Valenciana) is an autovía in south-central Spain.

As of 2013, it lies entirely in the community of Castile-La Mancha. It starts at the Autovía A-41 at Ciudad Real and runs past the towns of Daimiel and Manzanares, and the small cities of Tomelloso and Villarrobledo, before ending at the village of Atalaya del Cañavate in the province of Cuenca, where it connects with the Autovía A-3 to Valencia and the Autovía A-31 to Albacete and Alicante .

Between Ciudad Real and Daimiel, the A-43 runs parallel to the road shared by the N-420 and N-430 routes, while between Daimiel and Manzanares (where it also connects with the Autovía A-4) it runs parallel to the N-430 alone. Between Manzanares and Atalaya del Cañavate, it runs parallel to the N-310.

In the future, the A-43 will be extended westwards from Ciudad Real to the Autovía A-5 near Mérida, in Extremadura, again running parallel to the N-430.
