= N-330 road (Spain) =

Highway in Aragon, Spain

Coordinates: 38°20′28″N 0°32′57″W

National road N-330
- Carretera nacional N-330
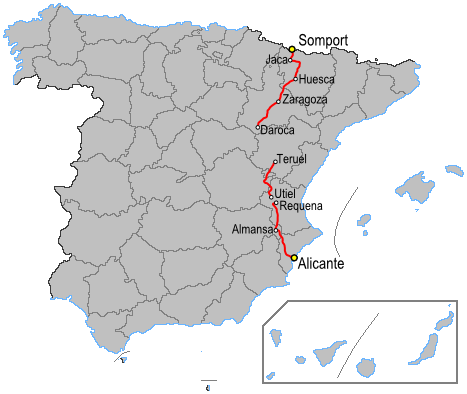

Route information
- Length: 733 km (455 mi)

Major junctions
- From: Alicante
- To: Somport

Location
- Country: Spain

Highway system
- Highways in Spain; Autopistas and autovías; National Roads

The N-330 is a highway in Aragon, Spain. It forms part of European Route E7.

It connects with France at the Tunnel of Somport (12 km) with Huesca. It then becomes the Autovía A-23 to Zaragoza. It heads south to Daroca, where it becomes the N-234.

The road emerges again south of Teruel following the Rio Turia. The N-420 branches west in the Rincón de Valencia rising to over 1,000m. It then runs south to Utiel and the Autovía A-3 in the province of Valencia. At Requena the road heads south again into the Sierra Martés with a junction with the N-322 and then crosses the Puerto de Cruz de Confrentes and then down to the Rio Xúquer. Thereafter it passes the Reserva Nacional de Muela de Cortes and a series of olive groves to Almansa and the Autovía A-31.
