= N-401 road (Spain) =

National highway in central Spain

National road N-401
- Carretera nacional N-401

Route information
- Length: 120 km (75 mi)

Major junctions
- From: Burguillos de Toledo
- To: Ciudad Real

Location
- Country: Spain

Highway system
- Highways in Spain; Autopistas and autovías; National Roads

The N-401 is a highway in Spain from Ciudad Real to Toledo.

It starts at the junction of the N-430, N-420 and the Autovía A-43. It heads north from Ciudad Real over the Rio Guadiana to the Sierra de la Calderina and the Montes de Toledo before reaching Toledo.

At Toledo are junctions with the N-400, N-403 and Autovía A-42.
