= Autovía A-316 =

Andalusian regional motorway and road from Úbeda to Alcaudete (Spain)

The Autovía A-316 is a highway in Andalusia, Spain.

The road starts at a junction with the N-322 at Úbeda. It heads south west through the olive groves to Jaén crossing the Guadalquivir. It ends with a junction with the N-432 at Alcaudete. To the west the N-316 and A340 connect to the Autovía A-44.
