= Autovía A-45 =

Motorway in Spain

Autovía A-45
- Autovía de Málaga
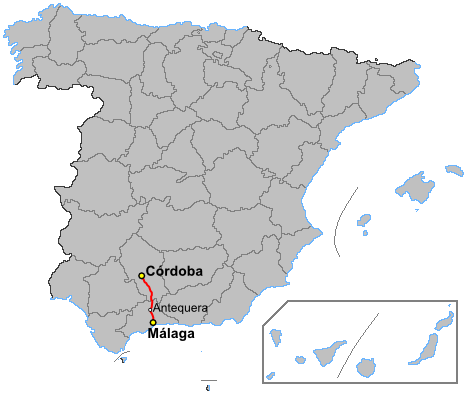

Route information
- Length: 142 km (88 mi)

Major junctions
- From: Córdoba
- To: Málaga

Location
- Country: Spain

Highway system
- Highways in Spain; Autopistas and autovías; National Roads

The Autovía A-45 (also known as Autovía de Málaga) is an autovía in Andalusia, Spain, running from the Autovía A-4 at Córdoba to the Autovía A-7 at Málaga. It replaced much of the former N-331 road.

Construction of the autovía began in 1992 when the section between Antequera and Málaga was built as an upgrade of the N-331. This was renumbered A-45 in 2003, as part of the general renumbering of Spanish autovías. The section between Córdoba and Benamejí was built in the mid-2000s, running parallel to the N-331, and the section between Benamejí and Antequera was built in 2009.

The section between Puerto de Las Pedrizas, several kilometres south of Antequera, and Málaga is frequently used by drivers travelling to and from Córdoba, Seville (via the Autovía A-92) and Granada (via the Autovía A-92M and A-92). In the late 2000s and early 2010s, the Autopista AP-46 was built to alleviate the traffic on this section.
