= Valdeaveruelo =

Valdeaveruelo, Spain
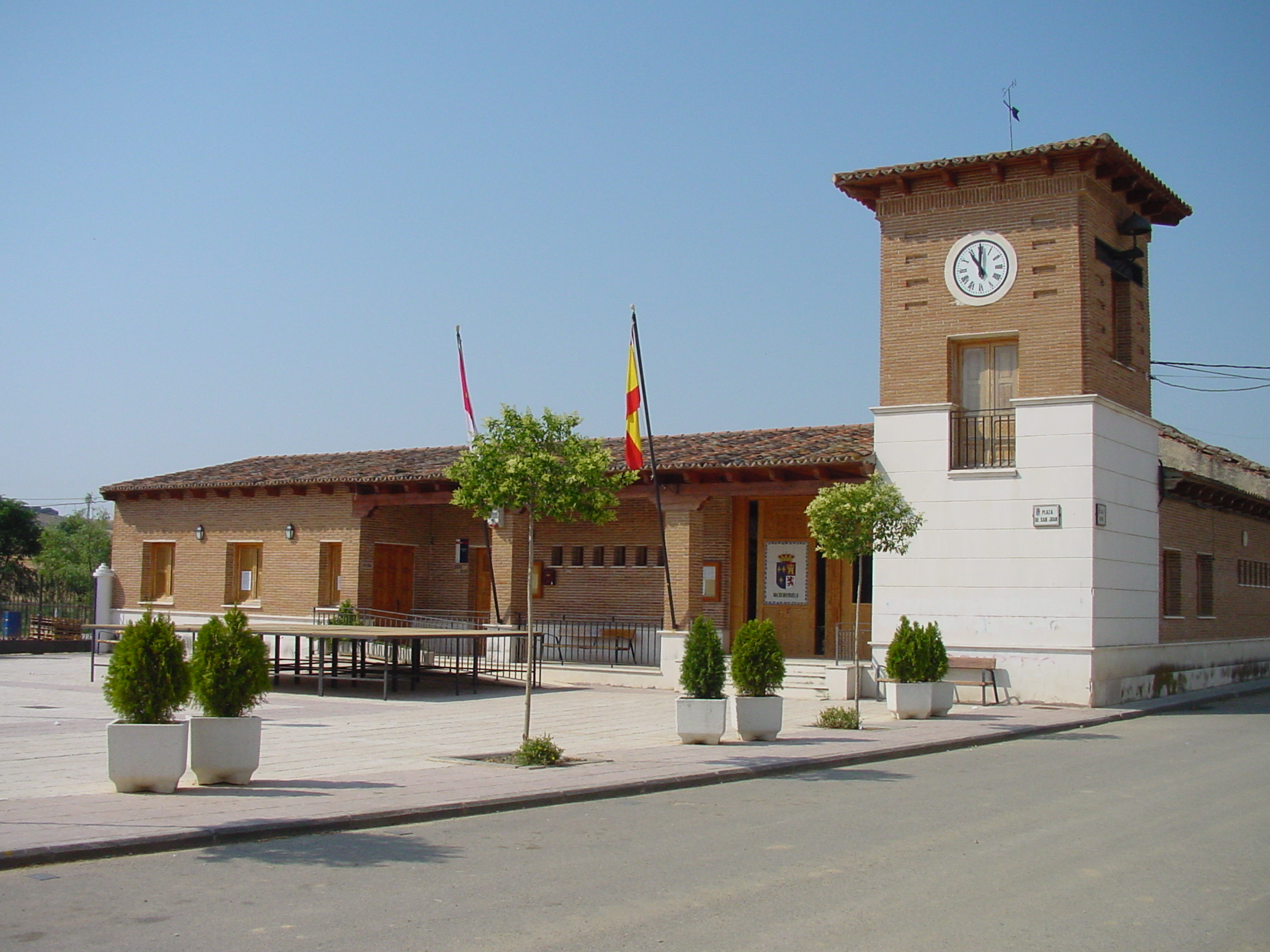

- Coat of arms

- Location within Province of Guadalajara Location within Castilla-La Mancha Location within Spain
- Coordinates: 40°38′17″N 3°18′56″W
- Country: Spain
- Autonomous community: Castile-La Mancha
- Province: Guadalajara
- Municipality: Valdeaveruelo

Area
  - Total: 17 km^{2} (6.6 sq mi)

Population (2025-01-01)
  - Total: 1,317
  - Density: 77/km^{2} (200/sq mi)
- Time zone: UTC+1 (CET)
  - Summer (DST): UTC+2 (CEST)

Valdeaveruelo is a municipality located in the province of Guadalajara, Castile-La Mancha, Spain. According to the 2004 census (INE), the municipality has a population of 530 inhabitants.

== Symbols ==
The coat of arms representing the municipality was officially approved on 3 October 1989, with the following blazon:

"Per pale. First, azure, three fleurs-de-lis or, well ordered. Second quarter, per fess, in both divisions the castle and the lion that appear in the armory of the Great Ducal House of Medinaceli (as this place formerly belonged to that duchy; therefore, the lion and castle are not derived from the Coat of Arms of Spain). At the crest, a closed Royal Crown."

— Official Gazette of Castilla-La Mancha, no. 44, 17 October 1989

== Geography ==
Valdeaveruelo is part of the La Campiña de Guadalajara region and is located 15 kilometres from the provincial capital. The municipal area is crossed by the N-320 road between kilometre points 300 and 301.

The terrain is rolling in the north and flat in the south, with elevations ranging from 852 metres in the north (Torrecabrón Hill) to 770 metres in the south. The town itself lies at an elevation of 740 metres above sea level.

== History ==
As a village, Valdeaveruelo belonged to the lands and common jurisdiction of Guadalajara. It remained part of this common until the early 17th century, when it was granted the status of a town. Shortly thereafter, it was sold to the Dukes of Medinaceli, under whose lordship it remained until the 19th century.

By the mid-19th century, the town had a registered population of 128 inhabitants. Valdeaveruelo is described in volume XV of Pascual Madoz’s Geographical-Statistical-Historical Dictionary of Spain and Its Overseas Possessions as follows:

"VAL DE AVERUELO: a town with a town council in the province and judicial district of Guadalajara (2 leagues), territorial court of Madrid (8), captaincy-general of New Castile, diocese of Toledo (20). Situated on the slope of a hill, well ventilated and with a healthy climate. It has 40 houses; the town hall with jail; a parish church (Saint John the Baptist) served by a priest and a sacristan. Its boundaries are Torrejón del Rey, Valdeavero, Villanueva de la Torre, and Valdebuena. Within the district there is a spring with good water and a hermitage (Our Lady of Solitude). The land is flat and of good quality. Local roads are in fair condition. Mail is received and dispatched in Alcalá. Production includes cereals, legumes, firewood, and pasture grasses sustaining sheep and mule livestock; there is game such as partridges, rabbits, and hares. Population: 38 households, 128 inhabitants."

— Madoz 1849, pp. 255–256

== Demographics ==
Valdeaveruelo has a population of 1,317 people as of 2025.

== Bibliography ==
- Madoz, Pascual (1849). Geographical-Statistical-Historical Dictionary of Spain and Its Overseas Possessions. Vol. XV. Madrid. pp. 255–256.
