= A318 (disambiguation) =

The Airbus A318 is a short- to medium-range, narrow-body, commercial passenger jet airliner built by Airbus Industrie.

A318 may also refer to:

- A318 road (Great Britain), a main road in the UK connecting Chertsey and Byfleet
- Autovía A-318, a highway in the Andalucian region of Spain
