= Antonio Rangel =

Antonio Rangel may refer to:

- Antonio Rangel (badminton), Mexican badminton player
- Antonio Rangel (footballer), Spanish footballer
