= N113 =

N113 may refer to:

- Scania N113, a city bus which was first built in 1988
- N-113 road (Spain), a road connecting the Sierra del Moncayo and the N-122 15 km east of Tarazona
- N 113, one of the most prominent star-forming regions of the Large Magellanic Cloud
