= N-601 road (Spain) =

Spain

National road N-601
- Carretera nacional N-601

Major junctions
- From: Madrid
- To: Leon

Location
- Country: Spain

Highway system
- Highways in Spain; Autopistas and autovías; National Roads

The N-601 is a highway in central Spain. It connects Madrid with Leon.

It starts at junction 108 km on the Autopista AP-6 north of Madrid with a junction with N-VI and N-403. The road heads north across a plain parallel to the Rio Adaja crossing the new AVE line before the River Eresma and Rio Cega. After 80 km the road arrives at Valladolid with the Rio Duero. There are junctions with the Autovía A-11 and Autovía A-62. Thereafter the road crosses the Montes de Torozos via Medina de Rioseco with a junction on the N-610. After a further 42 km the road reaches junction 21 of the Autovía A-231. A further 20 km takes the road into Leon. The road here meets the Autopista AP-71 and Autovía A-66 as well as N-630.
