= Autovía A-40 =

Motorway in Spain

Autovía A-40
- Autovía de Castilla-La Mancha
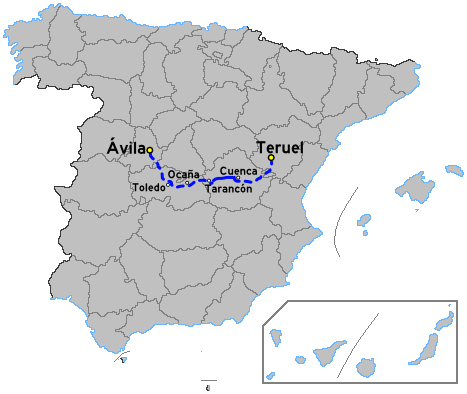

Route information
- Length: 89 km (55 mi)

Major junctions
- From: Ávila
- To: Teruel

Location
- Country: Spain

Highway system
- Highways in Spain; Autopistas and autovías; National Roads

The Autovía A-40 is an autovía (motorway) in Castile, Spain, serving as a gradual upgrade of the N-400. The road runs from Toledo to Cuenca.

After junction 73 of Autovía A-42 the road as N-400 heads east along the south bank of the Rio Tajo. At Aranjuez it crosses the Autovías A-4 and R-4. It follows the A-4 before branching east after Ocaña. At Tarancón the road crosses the Autovía A-3 before heading east into the Sierra de Altomira and a bridge over the Canal de Trasvase Tajo Segura. The new AVE line from Madrid to Alicante and Valencia is to the south of the road. The road is Autovía grade as it passes through the Altos de Cabrejas and over the Puerto de Cabrejas (1,150m) before reaching Cuenca and the junctions with the N-320, N-420.
