= El Casar =

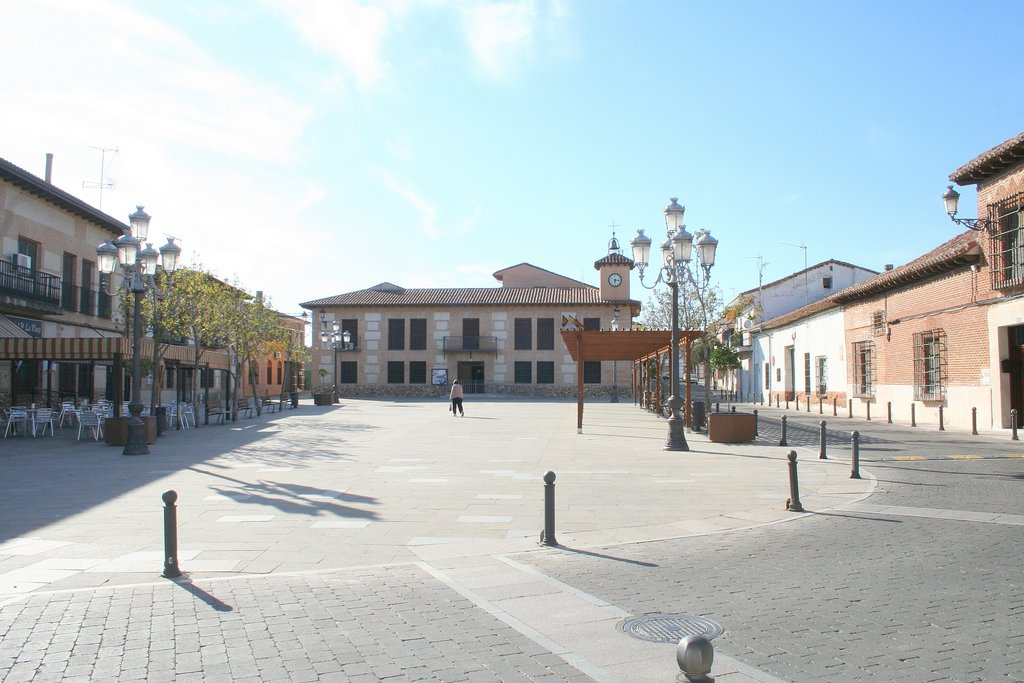

- Coat of arms
- Interactive map of El Casar
- Location within Spain Location within Castilla-La Mancha Location within Province of Guadalajara
- Country: Spain
- Region: Castile-La Mancha
- Province: Guadalajara

Area
  - Total: 51.84 km^{2} (20.02 sq mi)
- Elevation: 833 m (2,733 ft)

Population (2025-01-01)
  - Total: 13,962
  - Density: 269.3/km^{2} (697.6/sq mi)
- Time zone: UTC+1 (CET)
  - Summer (DST): UTC+2 (CEST)

El Casar (Spanish pronunciation: [el kaˈsaɾ]) is a municipality located in the province of Guadalajara, Castile-La Mancha, Spain.

Located in the border with the Community of Madrid, in the route of the N-320 road, it lies at 833 metres above sea level. The municipality covers an area of 51.84 km^{2}.

== History ==
The founding of El Casar dates back to 1085, during the repopulation efforts following the Castilian conquest. From its foundation it belonged to the royal domain, which later passed into the lordship of the archbishops of Toledo until the 16th century. It then reverted to royal ownership, which sold the town to the Duke of Salerno, who in turn transferred it to the Negrón family, who established an entailed estate (mayorazgo). This entail was extinguished in 1592, from which date, and up to the present day, El Casar has functioned as a free municipal council.

== Population ==
As of 2018 it has a population of 11,812. El Casar is one of the municipalities in the province that experienced a great population increase in the late 20th century, in parallel to a huge increase in the urbanised area, through low-density residential developments, initially intended mainly for second homes. The population has roughly multiplied tenfold during the 1981–2011 period.
