= European route E903 =

Road in trans-European E-road network

E-903

Route information
- Length: 631 km (392 mi)

Major junctions
- From: Mérida
- Ciudad Real, Albacete
- To: Alicante

Location
- Country: Spain

Highway system
- International E-road network; A Class; B Class

European route E 903 is a European B class road in Spain, connecting the city Mérida – Alicante.

== Route ==
- Spain
  - N-430: Mérida ( E90) - Ciudad Real
  - A-43: Ciudad Real - Manzanares ( E5) - Atalaya del Cañavate ( E901)
  - A-31: Atalaya del Cañavate ( E901) - Albacete - Alicante ( E15)
