= CQM =

CQM can refer to:

- Ciudad Real Central Airport, IATA airport code
- Classical Quantum Mechanics
- Custom Quantization Matrix
- Creative Quadratic Modulaton, a sound synthesis technology developed by E-mu Systems implemented on later-model ViBRA chips to replace the internal Yamaha OPL3 FM synthesizer chips
