= N-110 road (Spain) =

Road in Spain

National road N-110
- Carretera nacional N-110
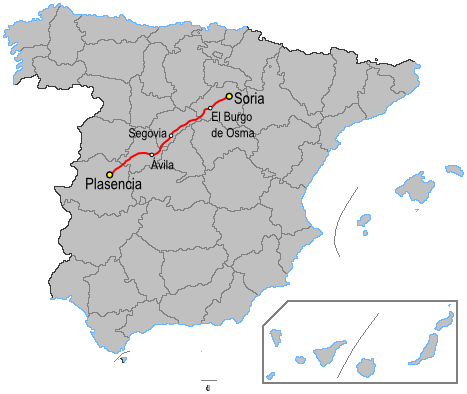

Route information
- Length: 376 km (234 mi)

Major junctions
- From: Soria
- To: Plasencia

Location
- Country: Spain

Highway system
- Highways in Spain; Autopistas and autovías; National Roads

The N-110 is a highway in Spain from Plasencia to the Duero Valley via Ávila and Segovia.

The road commences at Plasencia branching from the N-630 heading north west up the Rio Jerte valley between the Montes de Tres la and Sierra de San Bernabé until it reaches the Puerto de Tornavacas (1,277 m) after which it heads past the Sierra de Villafranca and Sierra de Ávila with the Puerto de Villatoro. The road comes to the historic city of Ávila where there are junctions with the N-403 and N-502.

After Ávila the road passes to Segovia along the northern flanks of the Sierra de Guadarrama. It passes over the Autopista AP-6 and N-VI. The Autopista AP-51 and Autopista AP-61 provides an alternative route.

The road continues north east to the Autovía A-1 junction north of Puerto Somosierra (1,440 m). The road heads through the Sierra de Pela before ending in the Duero Valley with a junction with the N-122
