= Autovía A-44 =

Road in trans-European E-road network

Autovía A-44
- Autovía de Sierra Nevada-Costa Tropical
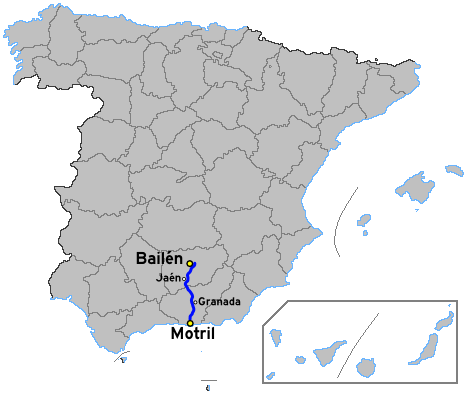

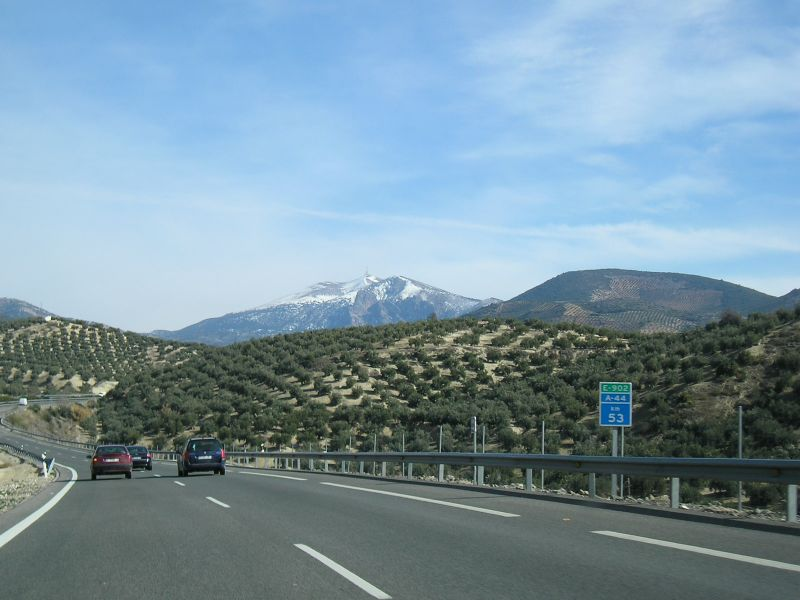

Route information
- Part of E902
- Length: 190 km (120 mi)

Major junctions
- From: A-4 in Bailén
- A-316 in Jaén; A-92 in Granada
- To: A-7 in Vélez de Benaudalla near La Gorgoracha

Location
- Country: Spain

Highway system
- Highways in Spain; Autopistas and autovías; National Roads

The Autovía A-44 is a highway in Andalucia, Spain. It is also known as the Autovía de Granada / Sierra Nevada. The route also forms the entirety of European route E 902, a B class road in the International E-road network. A-44 / E 902 connects the coastal municipality of Motril to the inland town of Bailén.

It starts at La Gorgoracha from a section of the Autovía A-7 which starts at Motril at the junction of the N-340. From La Gorgoracha it runs parallel to the old N-323, but to the east of Velez de Benaudalla heading Rules dam (the old, and still existing section of the N-323 between Motril and Izbor, heads up the gorge of the Rio Guadalfeo into the Valle de Lecrin with Las Alpujarras to the east). The road heads through the Sierra Nevada passing over the Puerto del Suspiro del Moro (865 m). It then passes to the west of Granada the north of which is a junction with the Autovía A-92. The road heads north through the Sierra de Lucena by the Puerto del Carretero (1,040 m). It then follows the valley of the Rio Guadalbullón to Jaén. It then joins the Autovía A-4 at Bailén.

Currently, A-44 / E 902 is finished. The latest section Ízbor-Motril was finished in August 2008 including a couple of bridges over the lake of Rules dam, before it was finished the still existing N-323 national road was the way to get to Motril from Velez de Benaudalla.

The new section of A-44 / E 902, running west from Granada to divert traffic from the current ring road, was officially opened on 16 December 2020. The already existing portion of the motorway was renamed GR-30.

== Route ==
- Spain
  - A-44 / E902: Bailén ( E5) - Jaén - Granada ( GR-30) - Motril ( E15)
