= Church of San Martín (La Gineta) =

- Iglesia Parroquial de San Martín (Spanish)
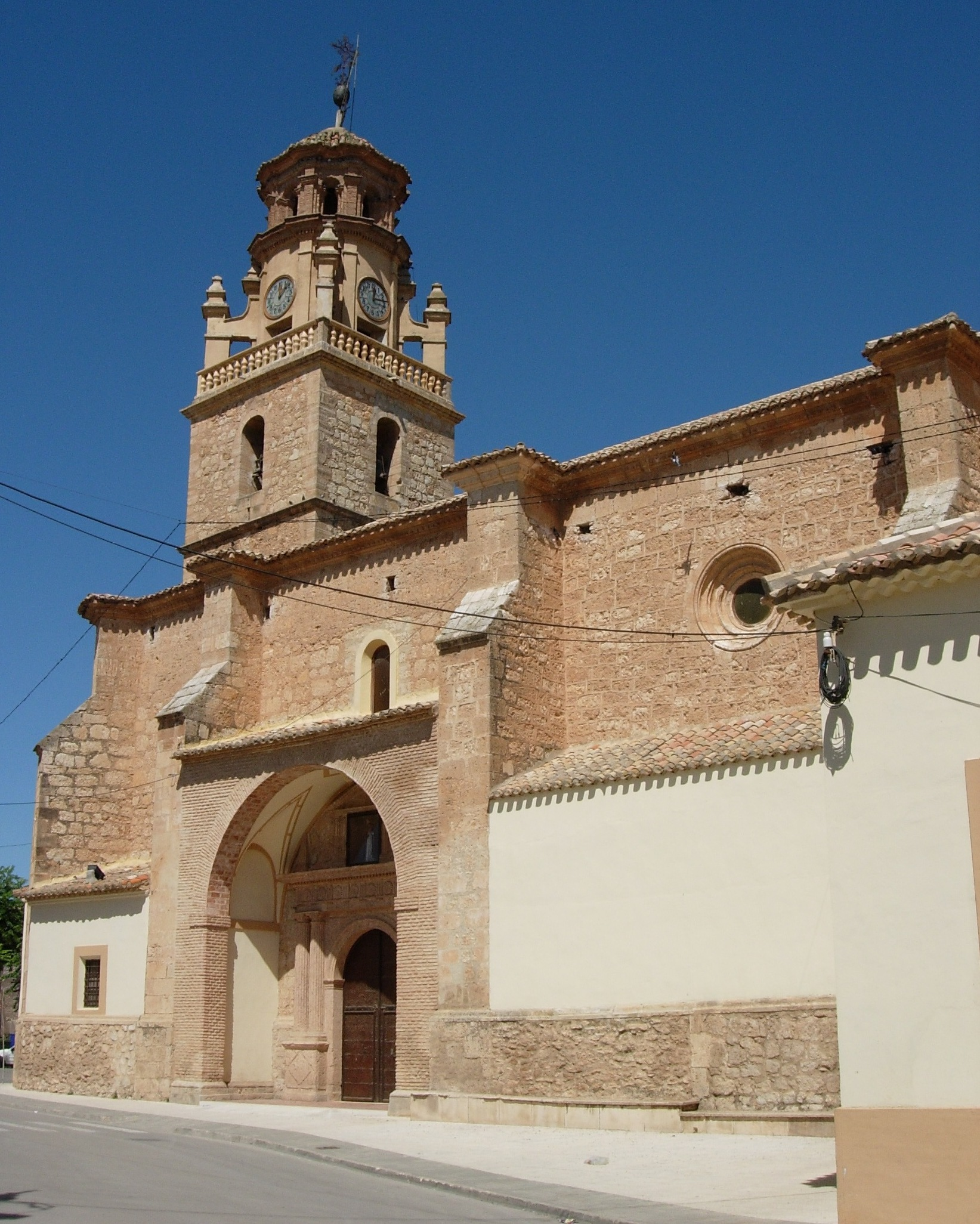

- Location within Spain
- 39.113938°N 1.997303°W
- Location: La Gineta, Spain

Spanish Cultural Heritage
- Official name: Iglesia Parroquial de San Martín
- Type: Non-movable
- Criteria: Monument
- Designated: 1992
- Reference no.: RI-51-0007364

The Church of San Martín (Spanish: Iglesia Parroquial de San Martín) is a church located in La Gineta, Spain. It was declared Bien de Interés Cultural in 1992.

The church was erected in an anachronistic gothic style in the 16th century. The ceiling has complex tracery. The main portal, of Renaissance style, has been attributed to Jerónimo Quijano, or Andrés de Vandelvira. The former main retablo (1648) was completed in Plateresque style, attributed to Juan Sánchez Cordobés. It was almost completely destroyed during the Spanish Civil War.
