= Antonio Rangel (footballer) =

Spanish footballer

Personal information
- Full name: Antonio Jiménez Rangel
- Date of birth: 18 January 1986 (age 40)
- Place of birth: La Gineta, Spain
- Height: 1.85 m (6 ft 1 in)
- Position: Centre-back

Youth career
- Albacete

Senior career*
Years	Team	Apps	(Gls)
2005–2008	Albacete B		
2007	Albacete	3	(0)
2008–2010	Sangonera	32	(1)
2010–2012	Almansa	70	(9)
2012–2014	Conquense	68	(2)
2014–2016	Guadalajara	60	(4)
2016–2017	SS Reyes	33	(1)
2017–2018	Guadalajara	31	(1)
2018–2020	Alcobendas Sport	62	(2)
2020–2021	Azuqueca	27	(2)
2021–2023	Almansa	60	(5)
2023–2024	Huracán Balazote	33	(1)
- * Club domestic league appearances and goals as of 12 May 2024

Antonio Jiménez Rangel (born 18 January 1986) is a Spanish footballer who plays as a central defender.

== Club career ==
Born in La Gineta, Province of Albacete, Castilla–La Mancha, Rangel graduated from local Albacete Balompié's youth system, starting his senior career with their reserves in the 2005–06 season, in the Tercera División. He made his professional debut on 3 June 2007, starting in a 0–0 Segunda División home draw against Xerez CD.

Rangel left Albacete in summer 2008, and competed in the Segunda División B but also in the fourth tier the following seasons, representing Sangonera Atlético CF, UD Almansa and UB Conquense. He achieved promotion with the last of those clubs at the end of the 2012–13 campaign, appearing in 33 matches and scoring twice.

On 6 August 2014, Rangel signed for third-division CD Guadalajara. He continued to play in the lower leagues and amateur football until his retirement, with UD San Sebastián de los Reyes, Guadalajara, Fútbol Alcobendas Sport, CD Azuqueca and Almansa.
