= N-123 road (Spain) =

Road in Spain

National road N-123
- Carretera nacional N-123

Route information
- Length: 35 km (22 mi)

Major junctions
- From: Benabarre
- To: Barbastro

Location
- Country: Spain

Highway system
- Highways in Spain; Autopistas and autovías; National Roads

The N-123 is a short highway in northern Spain which connects Benabarre to Barbastro.

The road starts in Benabarre with a junction with the N-230. It heads west past the Embalse de Barasona north of the Sierra de Carrodilla. It then follows the Rio Cinca south before meeting the N-240 at Barbastro.
