= Tarancón =

- Municipality
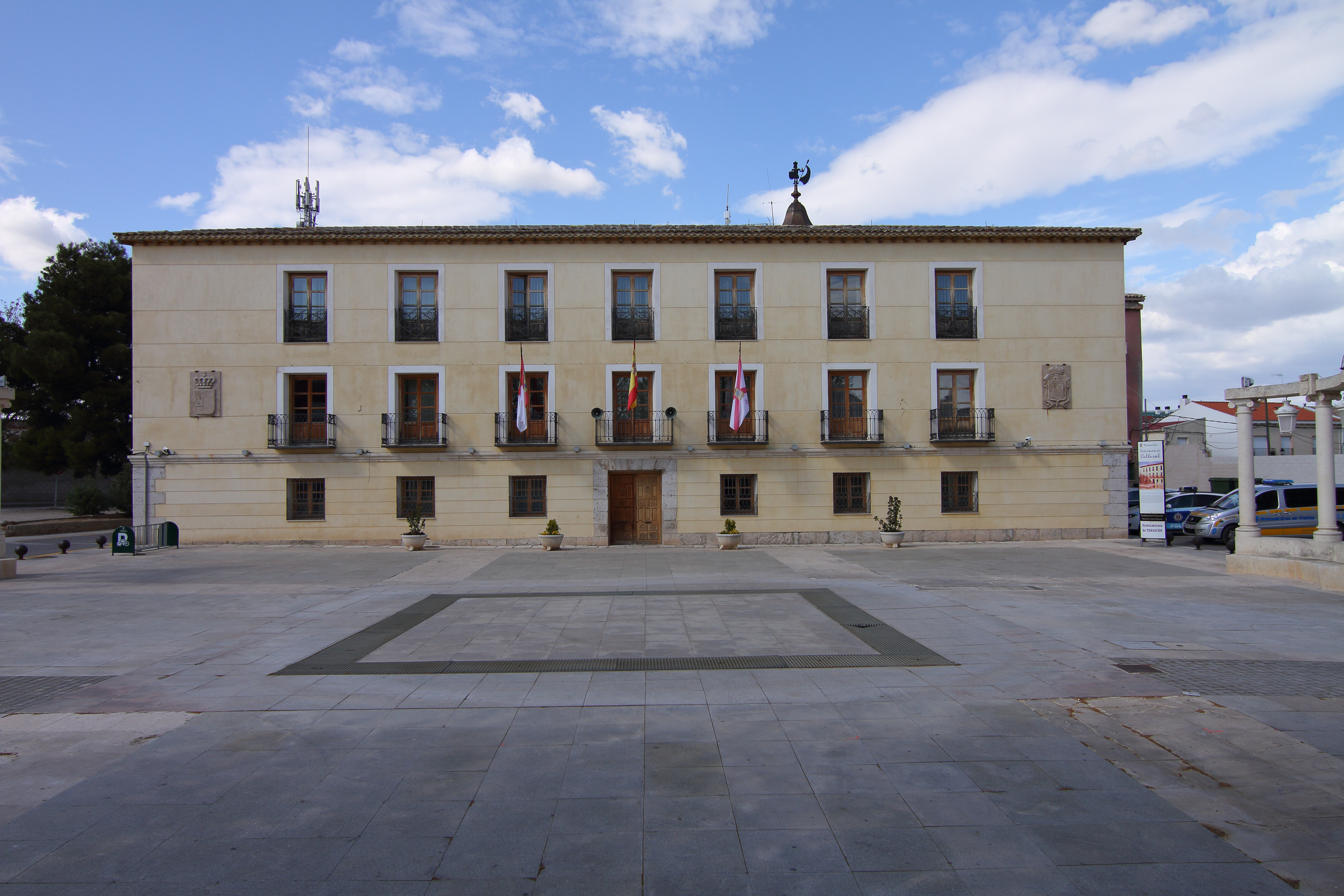
- Town hall

- Flag Coat of arms
- Interactive map of Tarancón
- Location within Castilla-La Mancha Location within Spain
- Coordinates: 40°00′31″N 3°00′37″W
- Country: Spain
- Autonomous community: Castile-La Mancha
- Province: Cuenca

Area
  - Total: 106 km^{2} (41 sq mi)

Population (2025-01-01)
  - Total: 16,748
  - Density: 158/km^{2} (409/sq mi)
- Time zone: UTC+1 (CET)
  - Summer (DST): UTC+2 (CEST)

Tarancón is a municipality of Spain located in the province of Cuenca, Castilla–La Mancha. As of 2024, it has a population of 16,462, which makes it the second most populated municipality in the province.

It lies at the crossroads of the A-3 route connecting Central Spain with the Levante and the A-40 route connecting Cuenca and Ocaña.

== History ==
The place's repopulation presumably dates back to the late 12th to early 13th century. Throughout the rest of the Middle Ages, Tarancón was a hamlet belonging to the land of Uclés, a dominion of the Order of Santiago after 1174. Tarancón was temporarily granted township status in 1537. It was granted the title of 'city' (ciudad) in 1921.
