= Autovía A-15 =

Motorway from Medinaceli to Tudela (Spain)

Autovía A-15
- Autovía de Navarra
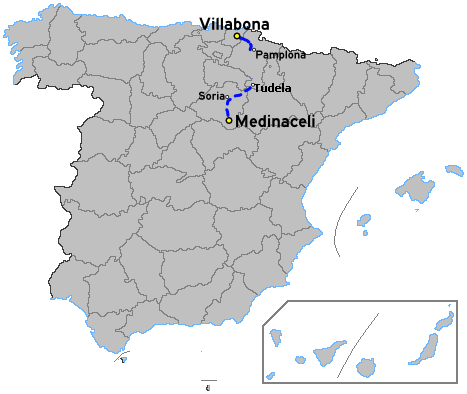

Route information
- Length: 164.29 km (102.09 mi)

Major junctions
- From: Medinaceli/Irurtzun
- To: Tudela/Andoain

Location
- Country: Spain

Highway system
- Highways in Spain; Autopistas and autovías; National Roads

The Autovía A-15 is a highway in Spain from Tudela to San Sebastián.

The road sets off in the N-1 road from Andoain, south of San Sebastián. It heads south east by the Aralar Range crossing the green mountainous region of north-eastern Navarre past the stream Larraun until Irurtzun, where a more rolling and drier landscape starts (junction with the N-240). The A-15 passes south of Pamplona with junctions with the N-111 and N-121 as well as N-135.

The A-15 heads south over the Puerto del Carrascal (594m) and past Tarana and into the Rio Aragón valley. The road ends at Autopista AP-68.
