= N-400 road (Spain) =

Highway in Spain

National road N-400
- Carretera nacional N-400

Route information
- Length: 180 km (110 mi)

Major junctions
- From: Toledo
- To: Cuenca

Location
- Country: Spain

Highway system
- Highways in Spain; Autopistas and autovías; National Roads

The N-400 is a highway in Spain from Toledo to Cuenca. It is being upgraded to the Autovía A-40, section by section.

It starts at the junction of the N-401, and the Autovía A-42 east of Toledo.

It heads east to Aranjuez and the Autopista R-4 and Autovía A-4. It then heads east with a junction to the N-301. There is also a junction with the Autovía A-3 at Taracón.

The N-400 then heads through the Altos de Cabrejas to Cuenca and has been partly upgraded to the Autovía A-40.
