= N-135 road (Spain) =

Spain

National road N-135
- Carretera nacional N-135

Route information
- Length: 59.14 km (36.75 mi)

Major junctions
- From: Pamplona
- To: Roncesvalles

Location
- Country: Spain
- Major cities: Zubiri, Erro, Aurizberri, Auritz, Roncesvalles, Luzaide

Highway system
- Highways in Spain; Autopistas and autovías; National Roads

The N-135 is a highway in Spain.

It starts north of Pamplona with a junction on N-121 and Autovía A-15.

The N-135 heads north up the valley of Rio Arga and the Puerto Ibañeta (1,057m) near Roncesvalles. It then enters France 8 km (5.0 mi) south of St Jean Pied de Port.
