= N-320 road (Spain) =

Highway of the State Highway Network

National road N-320
- Carretera nacional N-320
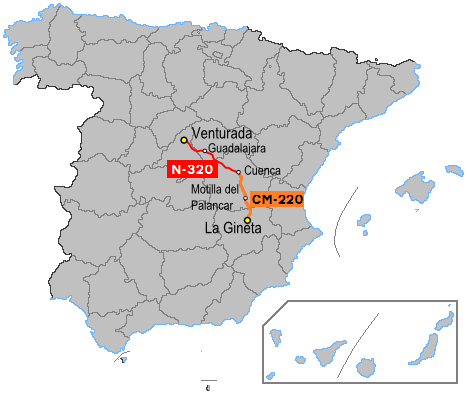

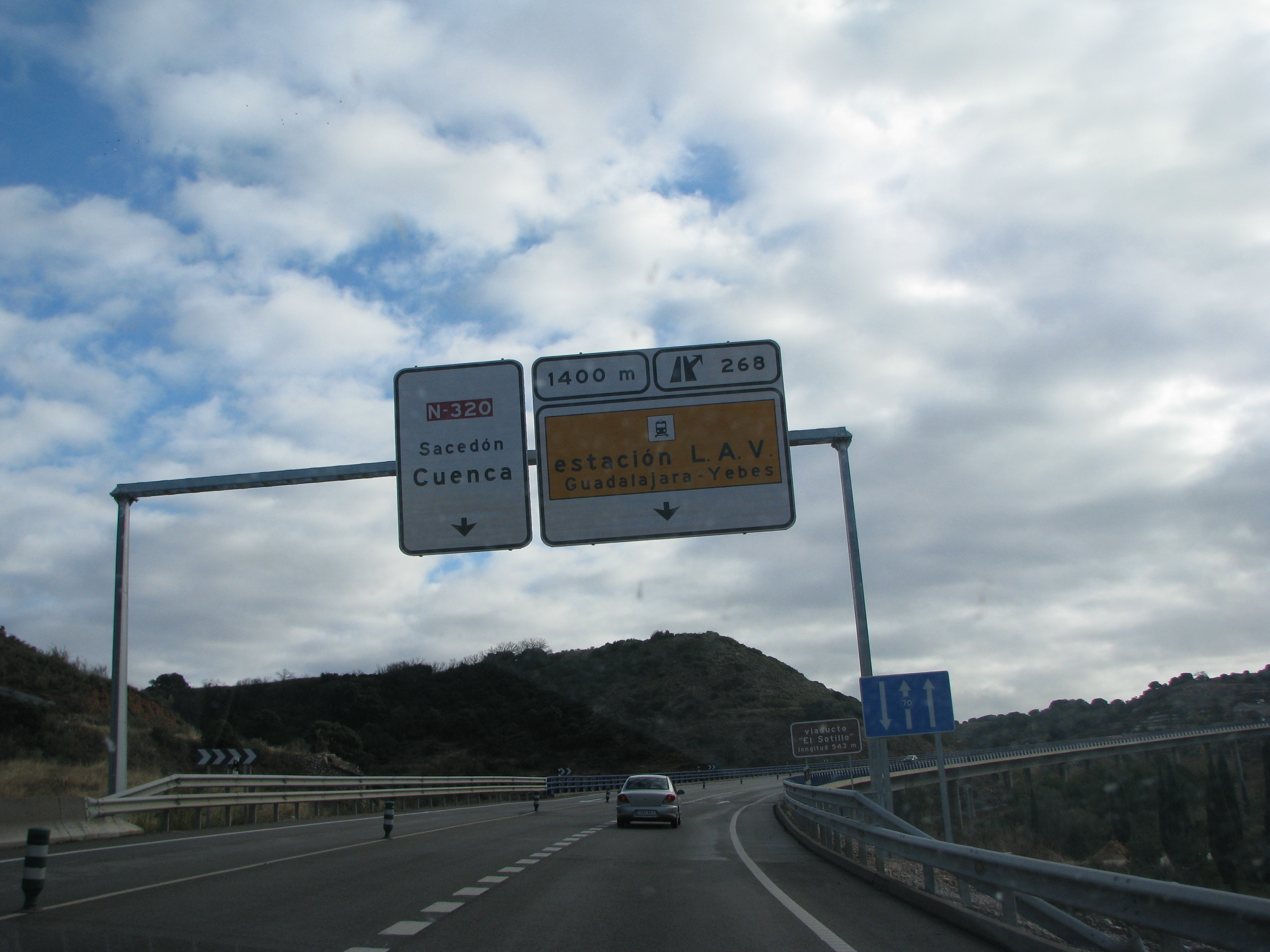

Route information
- Length: 230 km (140 mi)

Major junctions
- From: La Gineta
- To: Venturada

Location
- Country: Spain

Highway system
- Highways in Spain; Autopistas and autovías; National Roads

The N-320 is a road in eastern Spain. It starts north of Albacete with a junction on the Autovía A-31. It heads north across the River Jucar. The road crosses the Autovía A-3 before entering wooded hills.

The road comes to Cuenca where it meets the N-420 and the Autovía A-40 which is being constructed. The N-320 continues north along the western flanks of the forested Serrania de Cuenca. The road turns west to cross the Mar de Castilla a major reservoir. It then passes through the mountains of La Alcarria and into the plain of Madrid.

The road passes north east of Madrid to Guadalajara and a junction with the Autovía A-2 and Autopista Radial R-2. The road remains north east of Madrid ending at Torrelaguna and a junction (50 km) of the Autovía A-1 below the towering Sierra de Guadarrama.
