= N-121 road (Spain) =

Spain

National road N-121
- Carretera nacional N-121

Major junctions
- From: Tudela
- To: Irun

Location
- Country: Spain

Highway system
- Highways in Spain; Autopistas and autovías; National Roads

The N-121 is a highway in Spain.

It starts north of Tudela with a junction on N-113 and Autovía A-15. The road crosses the Las Bárdenas Reales and the Alto de Masadas to Tafalla. It passes the Puerto del Carrascal (594m) and then down into Pamplona. It has junctions with N-240, N-111 and N-135.

The N-121 heads north over the Puerto de Belate (847m). The road then splits in two the eastern branch following the Valle del Baztan and into France by the Puerto de Otxondo (602m).

The western branch turns west below the Parqu Nacional de Bertiz. It then turns north up the valley of the Rio Bidasoa to Irun and the Autopista AP-8.
