= Vélez de Benaudalla =

Coordinates: 36°50′N 3°31′W

Vélez de Benaudalla, Spain
- city
- Coat of arms

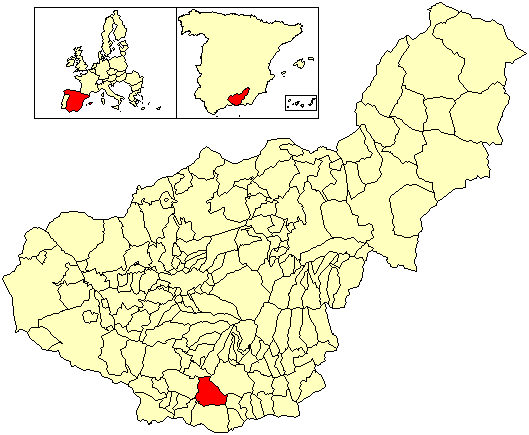
- Location of Vélez de Benaudalla
- Country: Spain
- Province: Granada
- Municipality: Vélez de Benaudalla

Area
  - Total: 79 km^{2} (31 sq mi)
- Elevation: 70 m (230 ft)

Population (2025-01-01)
  - Total: 3,108
  - Density: 39/km^{2} (100/sq mi)
- Time zone: UTC+1 (CET)
  - Summer (DST): UTC+2 (CEST)

Vélez de Benaudalla is a municipality in the province of Granada, Spain. According to the 2008 census (INE), the city has a population of 2,980 inhabitants.

The municipality includes the hamlet of La Gorgoracha, about 5 km (3.1 mi) south of the municipal center, towards the town of Motril. The Spanish national highway Autovía A-44, a.k.a. European route E 902, has its southern terminus here. Originally a farming area during the 16th century, it is now populated with scattered structures that are used for sporadic stays on weekends or holidays.

== See also ==
- List of municipalities in Granada
