= N-113 road (Spain) =

Highway in Spain

National road N-113
- Carretera nacional N-113
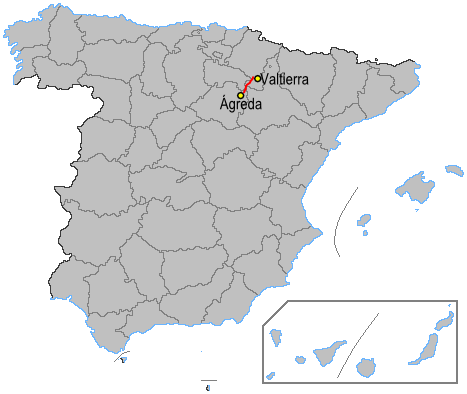

Route information
- Length: 45 km (28 mi)

Major junctions
- From: Ágreda
- To: Valtierra

Location
- Country: Spain

Highway system
- Highways in Spain; Autopistas and autovías; National Roads

The N-113 is a highway in northern Spain.

It starts in the Sierra del Moncayo with a junction on N-122 15 km (9 mi) east of Tarazona. It heads north past Muga (862m) onto the valley of the Rio Ebro. It crosses the Autopista AP-68, the N-232, Autovía A-15 and N-121.
