= Autovía A-41 =

Motorway in Spain

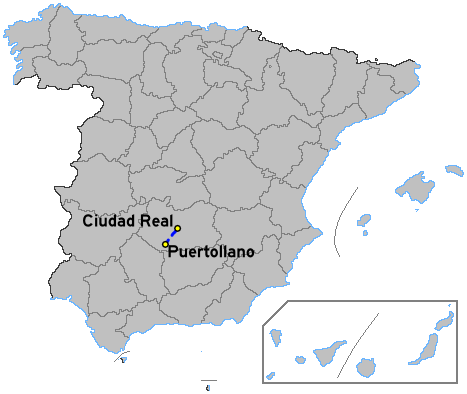
Course of the A-41 highway

The Autovía A-41 or Autovía Ciudad Real – Puertollano is a Spanish motorway, that has a length of 36.13 km. It passes through the region of Castile–La Mancha.
