= Motilla del Palancar =

- Municipality
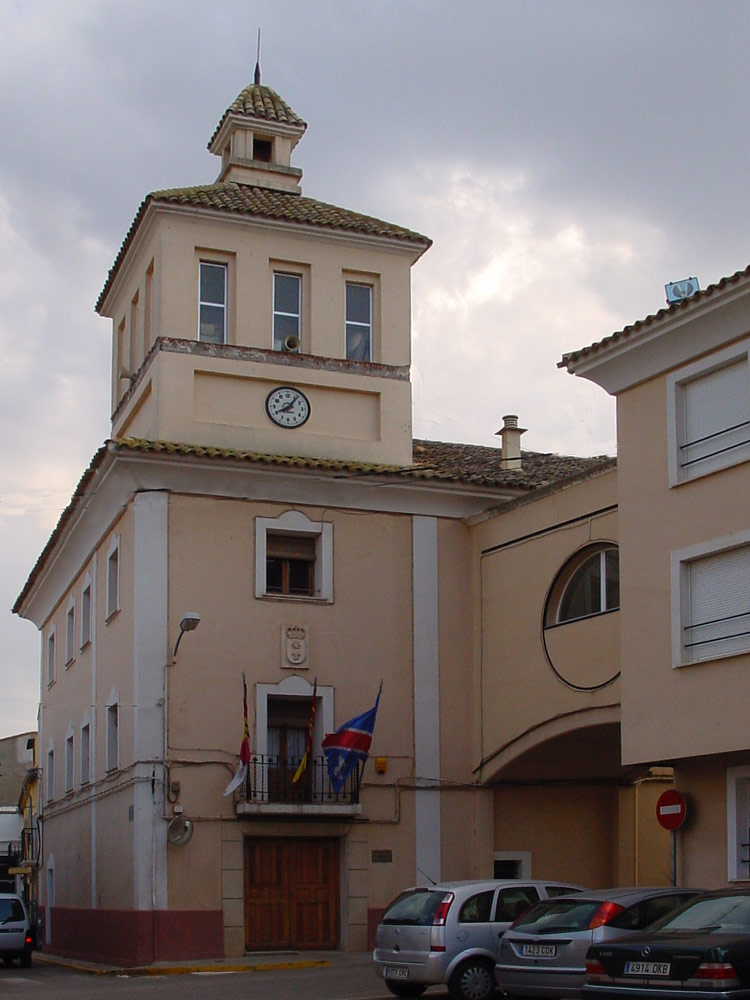
- City council of Motilla del Palancar

- Flag Coat of arms

- Location within Spain Location within Castilla-La Mancha
- Coordinates: 39°34′N 1°49′W
- Country: Spain
- Autonomous community: Castile-La Mancha
- Province: Cuenca

Government
  - Mayor: Pedro Javier Tendero (PSOE)

Population (2023)
  - Total: 6,119
- Time zone: UTC+1 (CET)
  - Summer (DST): UTC+2 (CEST)

Motilla del Palancar is a municipality in Cuenca, Castile-La Mancha, Spain. It has a population of 6,119.

== Notable people ==
- José Luis Olivas, Spanish politician of the People's Party. He was named the third president of the Generalitat Valenciana (the first not to have been chosen in elections)
