= Autovía A-92 =

Highway in Andalusia, Spain

Autovía A-92
- Autovía de Andalucía
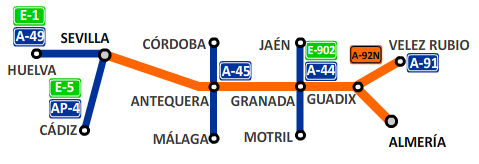

Almería Branch
- Length: 392 km (244 mi)
- From: Seville
- Major intersections: Guadix
- To: Almería

Lorca Branch
- Length: 414 km (257 mi)
- From: Seville
- Major intersections: Guadix
- To: Lorca

Location
- Country: Spain

Highway system
- Highways in Spain; Autopistas and autovías; National Roads

The Autovía A-92 is a highway in Andalusia, Spain. It is a major east–west route running south of the Sierra Nevada and is known as the Carretera Sevilla a Granada and Autovía de Andalucía.

It starts in Seville heading parallel to the Rio Guadaira to Antequera, where it is crossed by the Autovía A-45 from Málaga to Córdoba. It then crosses the Sierra Gorda to Loja and Vega de Granada before reaching Granada. Here the road is crossed by the Autovía A-44 from the coast and Motril to Jaén. The A-92 then passes over the Puerto de la Mora de Huétor (1,390 m) to Guadix.

At Guadix the road branches in two; the south passing La Calahorra Castle and along the Rio Nacimiento to Tabernas and Almería. The northern branch heads along the Hoya de Guadix and the Sierra de Baza before joining the Autovía A-7 at junction 578 km, 17 km south of Lorca. In Murcia the road is numbered Autovía A-91.

Over the past many years the road has experienced several problems. In 1991 before the road had opened, a mudslide caused a portion to collapse in Venta del Molinillo, Granada. Again in 1996, a section collapsed near Loja, Granada. In 2010, two separate portions of the road, in Jaén and Granada provinces, collapsed following weeks of heavy rainfall. Until 2010, €90 million had been spent on repairs.
