= R-4 motorway (Spain) =

Highway in Spain

Coordinates: 40.0777°N 3.6739°W

Route

The R-4 is a Spanish radial toll motorway originating from Madrid and passing through Valdemoro, connecting to the N-400, A-40 and AP-36.

The road is managed by Cintra.
