= Luque, Spain =

Luque
- Municipality
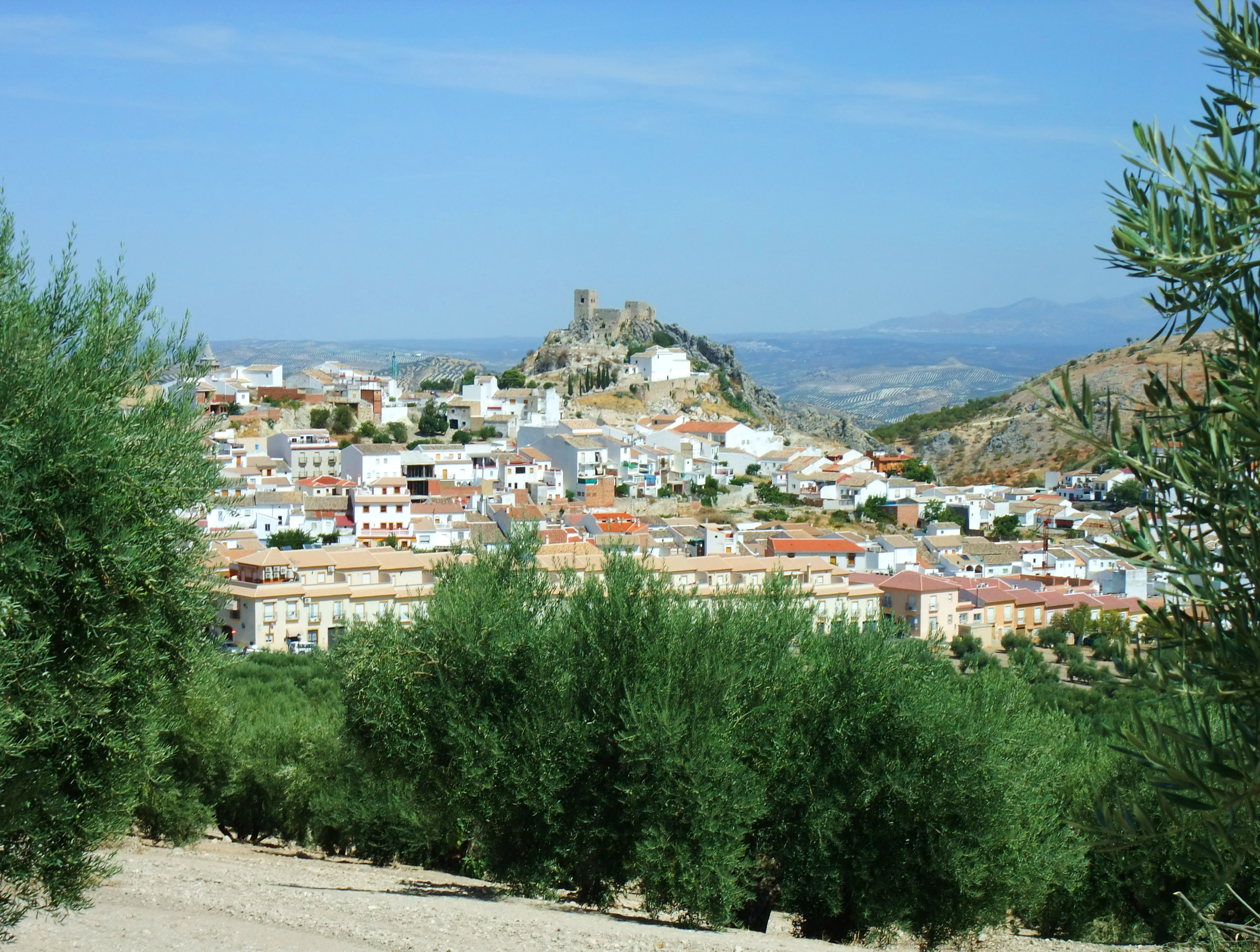

- Location within Andalusia Location within Spain
- Coordinates: 37°33′N 4°16′W
- Country: Spain
- Autonomous community: Andalusia
- Province: Córdoba

Area
  - Total: 140.69 km^{2} (54.32 sq mi)
- Elevation: 662 m (2,172 ft)

Population (2025-01-01)
  - Total: 2,796
  - Density: 19.87/km^{2} (51.47/sq mi)
- Time zone: UTC+1 (CET)
  - Summer (DST): UTC+2 (CEST)

Luque is a municipality of Spain belonging to the province of Córdoba, Andalusia. The municipality spans across a total area of 140.69 km^{2} and, as of 1 January 2023, it has a registered population of 2,860.

The settlement lies at about 662 metres above mean sea level at the feet of the Subbaetic ranges.

There is evidence of human presence in the area since at least the end of the Neolithic. The place is first mentioned in Islamic sources as the seat of a ḥiṣn ('Ḥiṣn Lukk') in the context of its seizure by Cordobese loyalists in 909. The Crown of Castile conquered the fortress at some point between February 1240 and March 1241. A lordship was created after the conquest. Luque was also a holding of the Order of Santiago for a time. From 1293 to 1374 it was part of the jurisdiction of the city of Córdoba. In 1374, the Trastámaras granted the town and castle of Luque to a turncoat of the Castilian Civil War as a reward.

== Bibliography ==
- Naranjo Ramírez, José (2015). "Apuntes para una geografía urbana de Luque (Córdoba)" (PDF). Revista ITVCI. 5: 150–177.
- Rodríguez Aguilera, Ángel; Martínez Enamorado, Virgilio (2012). "Lápidas funerarias árabes procedentes de Hisn Lukk / Luque (Córdoba)" (PDF). Antiqvitas (24): 265–276.
- Rodríguez Aguilera, Ángel (2016). "El castillo y la villa fortificada de Luque. Arqueología de la frontera con el Reino de Granada desde el sector cordobés" (PDF). Antiqvitas (28).
