= La Serrada =

- municipality
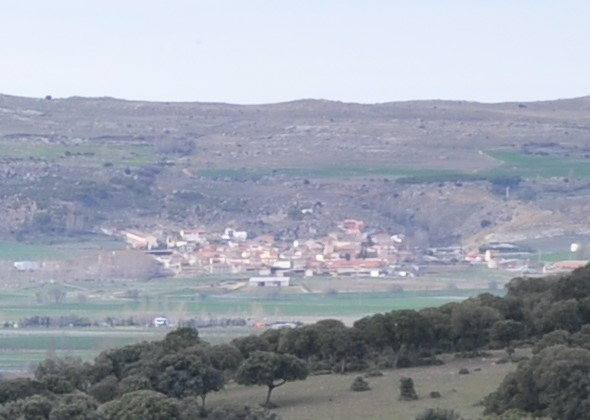
- La Serrada
- Flag Coat of arms
- Location in Spain. La Serrada (Castile and León)
- Coordinates: 40°37′53″N 4°47′32″W
- Country: Spain
- Autonomous community: Castile and León
- Province: Ávila
- Municipality: La Serrada

Area
  - Total: 7 km^{2} (2.7 sq mi)
- Elevation: 1,115 m (3,658 ft)

Population (2025-01-01)
  - Total: 132
  - Density: 19/km^{2} (49/sq mi)
- Time zone: UTC+1 (CET)
  - Summer (DST): UTC+2 (CEST)
- Website: Official website

La Serrada is a municipality located in the province of Ávila, Castile and León, Spain.

== Population ==
Historical population
Year	Pop.	±% p.a.
2023	137	—
2024	135	−1.46%
2025	132	−2.22%
Source: INE
