= N-6 road (Spain) =

National road in Spain

National road VI
- Carretera nacional N-VI
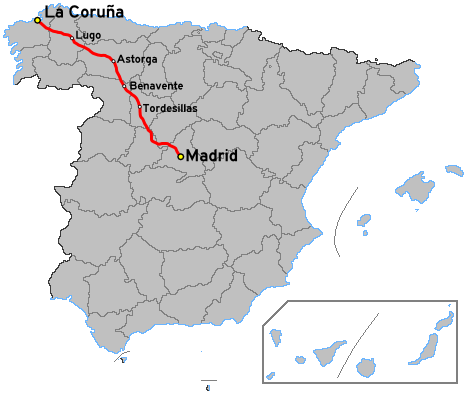

Route information
- Length: 606 km (377 mi)

Major junctions
- From: Madrid
- To: A Coruña

Location
- Country: Spain

Highway system
- Highways in Spain; Autopistas and autovías; National Roads

The N-VI is a major highway in Spain. It connects Madrid to A Coruña.

It has generally been up-graded or replaced by the Autovía A-6. It passes via Tordesillas, Ponferrada and Lugo.

This road is the subject of a documentary film directed by the Galician filmmaker Pela del Álamo and produced by Diplodocus Producións (www.diplodocus.es). The main theme of the tape is the process of abandonment experienced by traditional roads throughout the world once the routes are redirected by the new highways. The documentary is titled "N-VI" and was scheduled to premiere in early 2010.
