= La Gineta =

Municipality of Spain

- Municipality
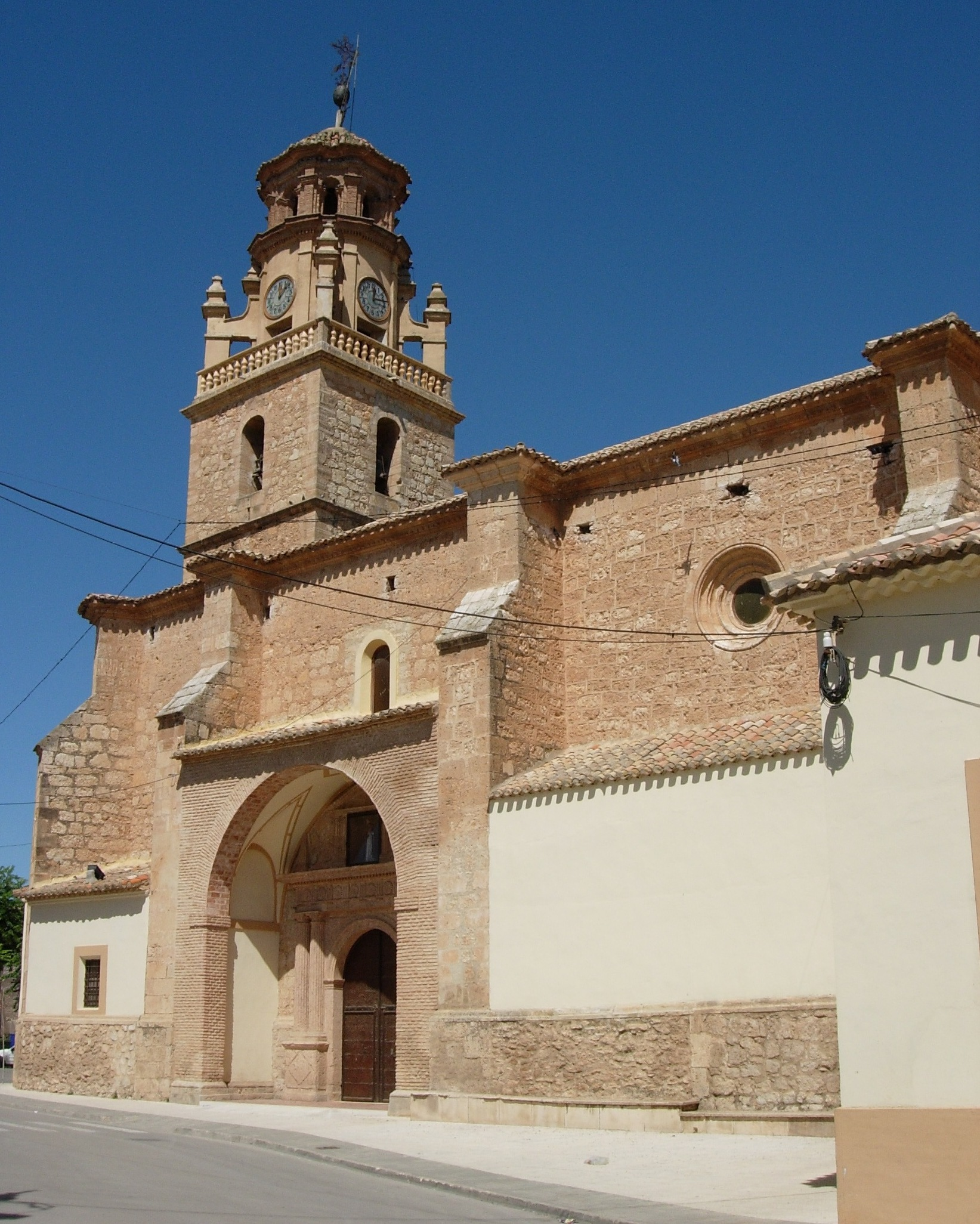

- Coat of arms
- Interactive map of La Gineta
- Location within Castilla-La Mancha Location within Spain
- Coordinates: 39°06′49″N 1°59′52″W
- Country: Spain
- Autonomous community: Castilla–La Mancha
- Province: Albacete
- Elevation: 691 m (2,267 ft)

Population (2025-01-01)
  - Total: 2,656
- Time zone: UTC+1 (CET)
  - Summer (DST): UTC+2 (CEST)

La Gineta is a municipality in the province of Albacete, autonomous community of Castilla-La Mancha, Spain. It has a population of 2,072. The historic Church of San Martín stands in the town.

It lies on the A-31 road route connecting central Spain with Albacete and Alicante.

== Industry ==
La Gineta is the site of a test track of the Talgo RD railway gauge changer.
