= Autovía A-4 =

Motorway in Spain

Autovía A-4
- Autovía del Sur

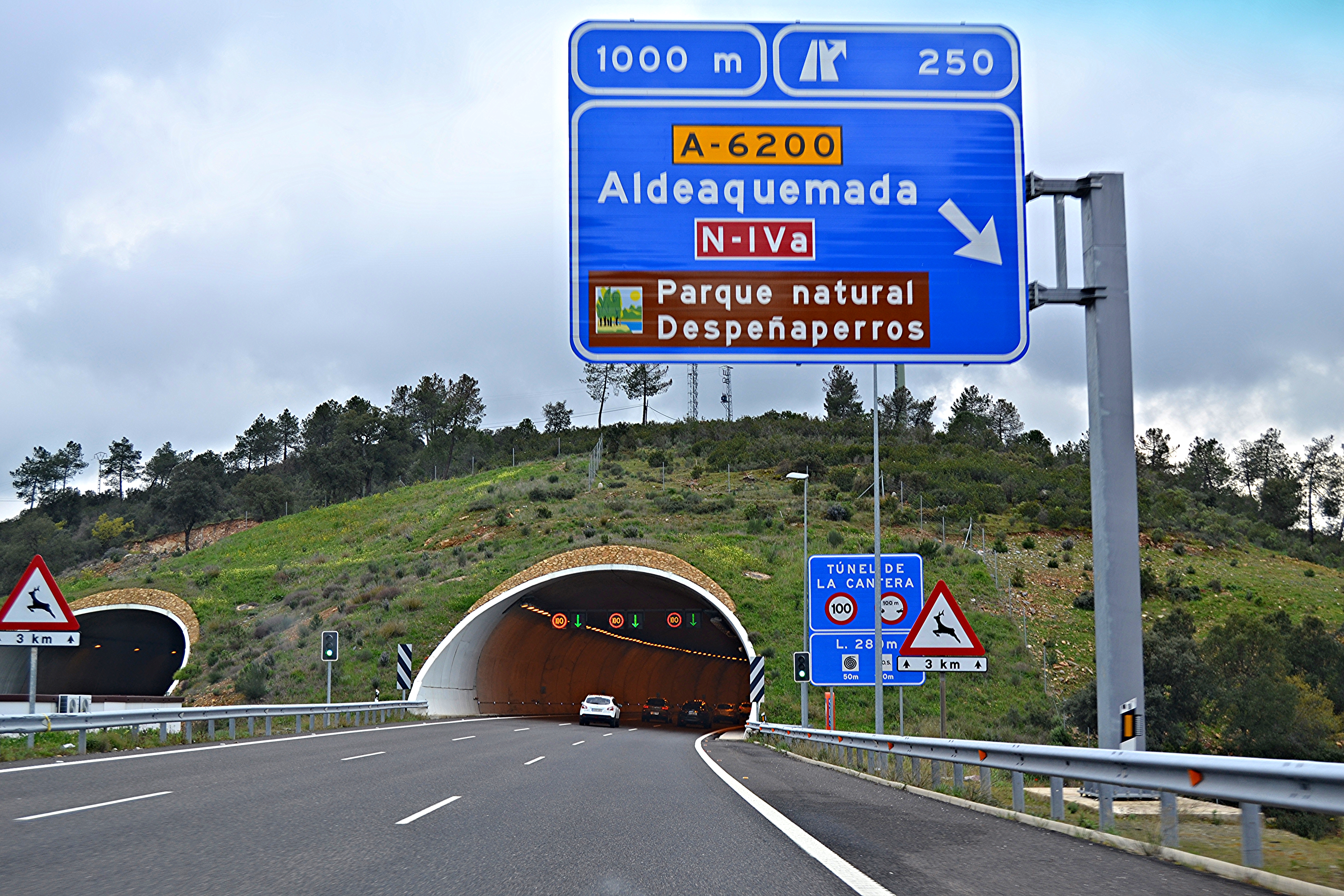

Route information
- Part of European route E5
- Length: 660 km (410 mi)

Major junctions
- North end: M-30 in Madrid
- M-40 in Madrid near Mercamadrid; M-45 in Madrid near Colonia Marconi; M-50 in Getafe; R-4 in Aranjuez; N-400 in Ontígola; A-40 in Ocaña; AP-36 / R-4 in Ocaña; CM-42 in Madridejos; A-43 in Manzanares; A-44 (E902) in Bailén; N-420 in Montoro; CO-31 in Córdoba; N-432 in Córdoba; CO-32 / A-45 in Córdoba; N-331 in Córdoba; SE-40 in Seville; SE-30 in Seville; A-480 in Jerez de la Frontera; A-491 in El Puerto de Santa María
- South end: A-48 / CA-33 in Puerto Real

Location
- Country: Spain

Highway system
- Highways in Spain; Autopistas and autovías; National Roads

The A-4 or Autovía del Sur (Spanish for Southern Highway) is a major Spanish highway and autopista route connecting Madrid to Cádiz. One of the six radial highways of the country, it was also known as Autovía de Andalucía (Spanish for Andalusia Highway) before 2015.

The road is entirely part of the European route E5. It mostly follows the path of the former N-4 road, crossing the provinces of Madrid, Toledo, Ciudad Real, Jaén, Córdoba, Seville and Cádiz.

Between Seville and Cádiz, the highway is known as Autopista AP-4, extending over 123.80 km. AP-4 used to be a toll road before 1 January 2020. The original N-4 in this section remained in service as a free option for this reason.

The construction works required major engineering work to tunnel through Despeñaperros Natural Park in the Province of Jaén, which separates the autonomous communities of Andalusia and Castilla-La Mancha. Construction started in the 1960s, reaching the city of Seville in 1992 and the Province of Cádiz in the 2000s.

== Sections ==
#	From	To	Length	Major places
1	Madrid	Aranjuez	52.72 km	Getafe; Pinto; Valdemoro; Seseña
2	Aranjuez	Ocaña	14.87 km	none
3	Ocaña	Madridejos	56.95 km	Tembleque
4	Madridejos	Manzanares	57.35 km	Puerto Lápice
5	Manzanares	Valdepeñas	27.86 km	Consolación
6	Valdepeñas	La Carolina	68.20 km	Santa Cruz de Mudela; Almuradiel; Despeñaperros
7	La Carolina	Baylen	26.36 km	Guarromán
8	Baylen	Andújar	29.64 km	none
9	Andújar	Córdoba	77.31 km	Marmolejo; Villa del Río; Montoro; Pedro Abad; El Carpio; Villafranca de Córdoba
10	Córdoba	Écija	54.13 km	La Carlota
11	Écija	Carmona	53.88 km	La Luisiana
12	Carmona	Seville	35.18 km	Seville Airport
13	Seville	Cádiz	123.80 km	Dos Hermanas; Los Palacios y Villafranca; Las Cabezas de San Juan; Jerez de la Frontera; El Puerto de Santa María; Puerto Real

== Gallery ==
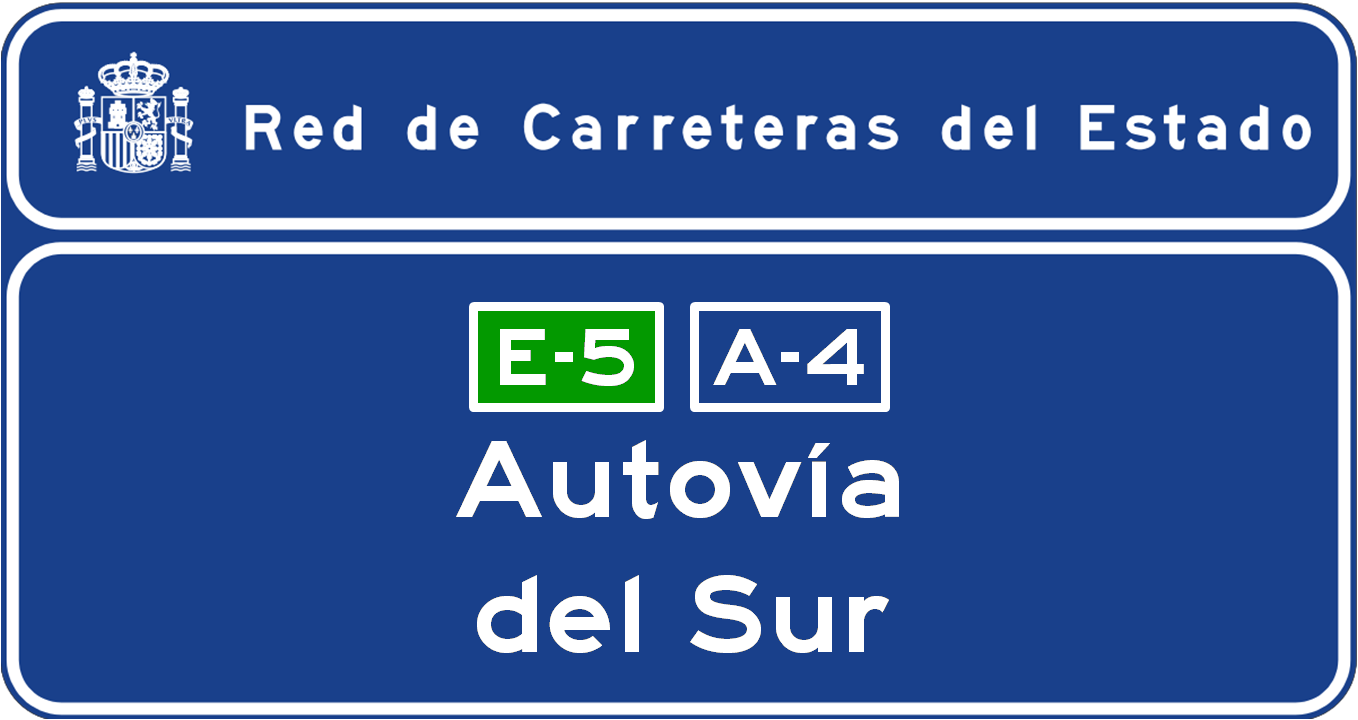
Road sign

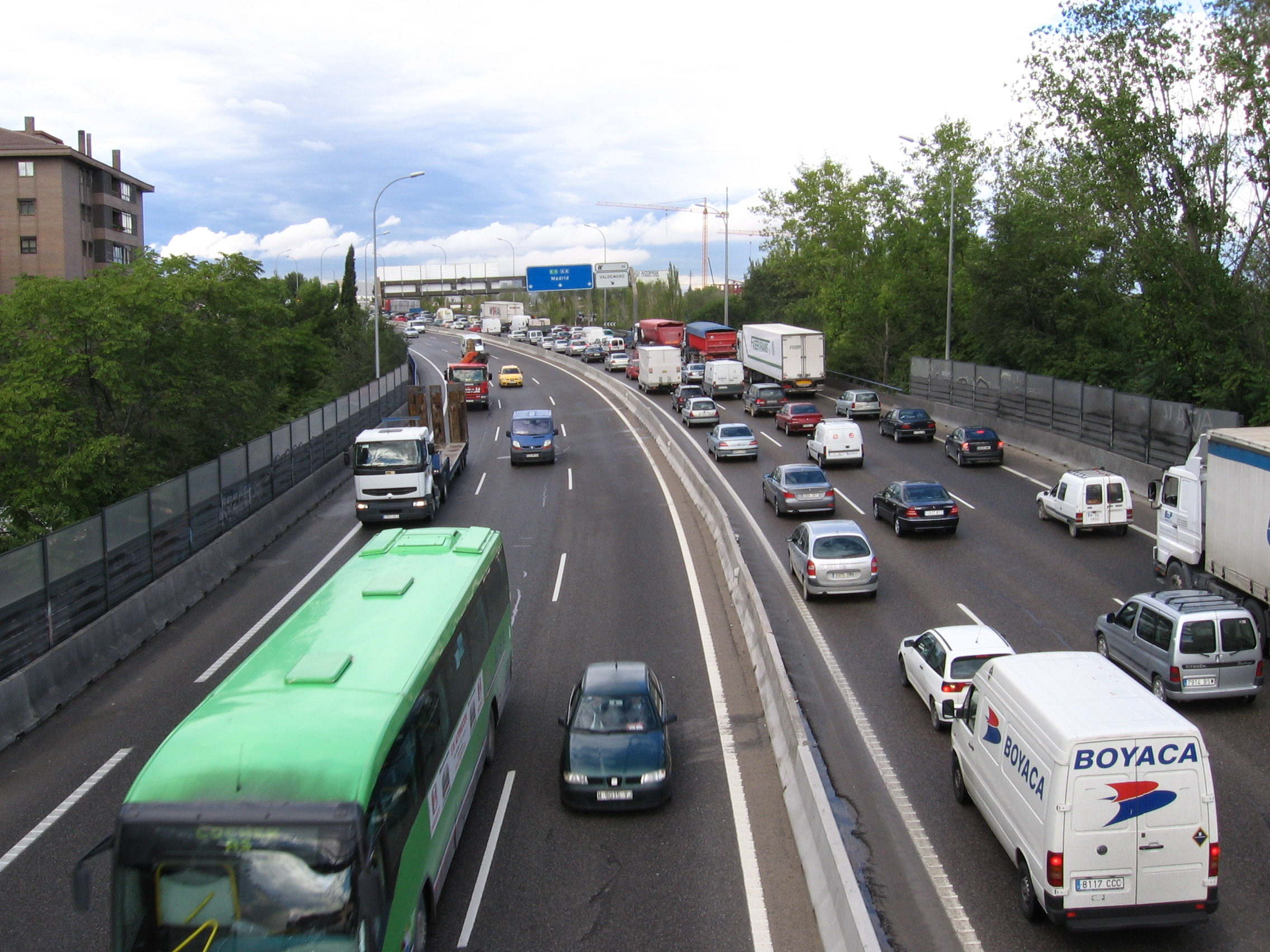
Autovía A-4 through Valdemoro in Madrid

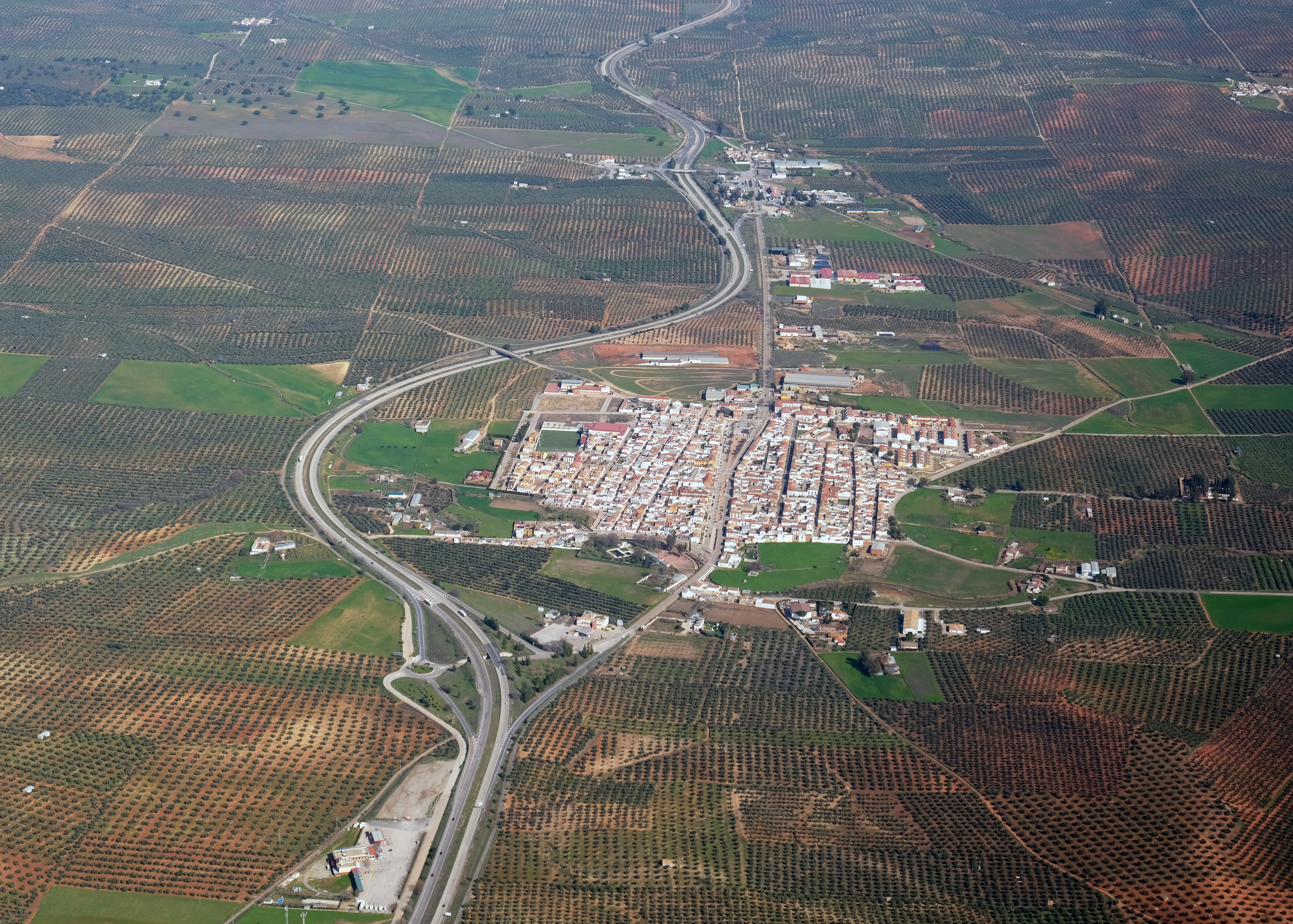
Autovía A-4 through Guarromán in Jaén
