= N-420 road (Spain) =

Highway in Spain

National road N-420
- Carretera nacional N-420

Route information
- Length: 803 km (499 mi)

Major junctions
- From: Montoro
- To: Tarragona

Location
- Country: Spain

Highway system
- Highways in Spain; Autopistas and autovías; National Roads

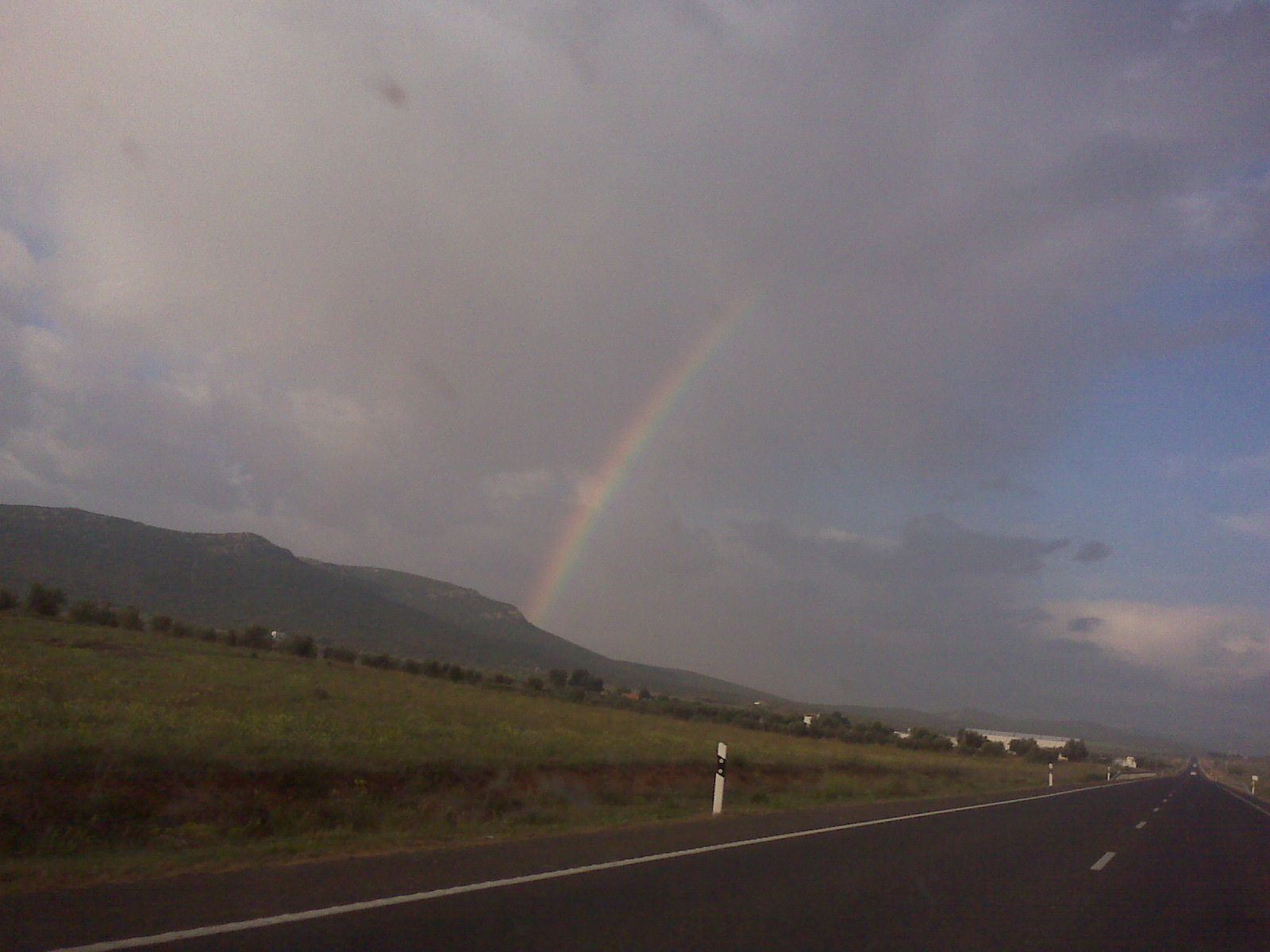
N420 between Puerto Lápice - Herencia

The N-420 is a highway in Spain.

The road starts 36 km east of Córdoba at Montoro (Junction 356 of the Autovía A-4). The N-420 runs north through the heavily wooded Sierra Morena passing over the Puerto de Niella (902m) then crossing the valley of the Rio Montoro before taking the Puerto Pulido to Puertollano. The AVE Sevilla-Madrid runs parallel to the road on its way to Ciudad Real.

Thereafter the road follows the Autovía A-43 before branching north to cross the A-4 again at Puerto Lapice, south of the Montes de Toledo. 21 km to the east the road passes Alcázar de San Juan and the Autovía CM-42 which is an upgrade of the CM-400. The landscape here is dominated by hill top Windmills. The road reaches Mota del Cuervo with a junction on the N-301 and Autopista AP-36, before passing the Castle of Belmonte 15 km later. After a junction with the Autovía A-3 (155 km) in La Almarcha the road passes along the valley of the Rio Jucar to Cuenca, where it crosses N-320. The road then heads east through the Serranía de Cuenca, crossing the Puerto de Rocho (1,150m) and into the Rincón de Ademuz before joining the N-330 and heading north. After 34 km the road reaches Teruel and junction with the Autovía A-23, upgrade of the N-234.

The N-420 heads north through the Sierra Palomera, joining the N-211 towards Alcañiz. Then, N-420 crosses the Puerto del Esquinazo (1,381m) and Puerto St Just (1,381m), ending at Tarragona.
