= N-432 road (Spain) =

Road in Spain

National road N-432
- Carretera nacional N-432
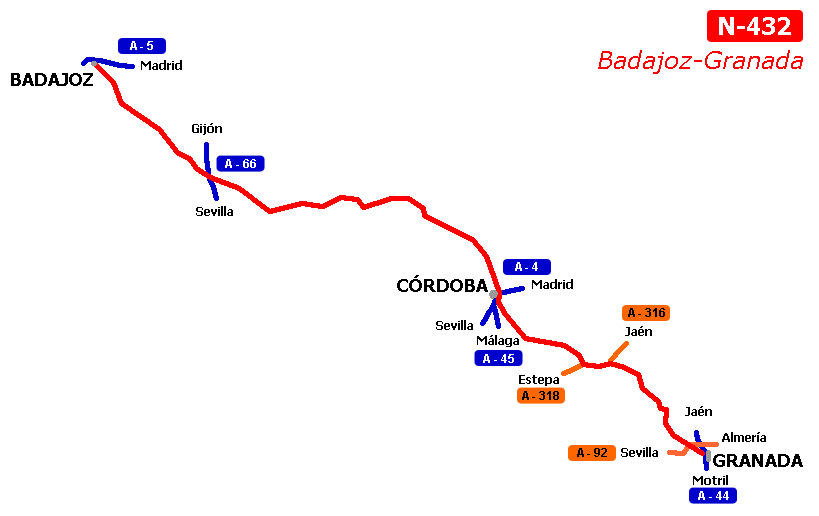

Route information
- Length: 420 km (260 mi)

Major junctions
- From: Badajoz
- To: Granada

Location
- Country: Spain

Highway system
- Highways in Spain; Autopistas and autovías; National Roads

The N-432 is a road in Extremadura and Andalusia, Spain.

It starts in Badajoz near the Portugal border and heads southeast crossing Autovía A-66 after passing Zafra. The road exits Extremadura and enters Andalucía through Sierra Morena, passing Peñarroya. Then it crosses a reservoir in Embalse de Puente Nuevo before crossing Córdoba. It then follows Río Guadajoz passing Castro del Río and Baena. The road does a short incursion into the Province of Jaén before reaching its end in Granada.

Its Jaén portion was cited as one of the ten riskiest road sections in Spain.
