= Autovía A-30 =

Road in Spain

Autovía A-30
- Autovía de Murcia
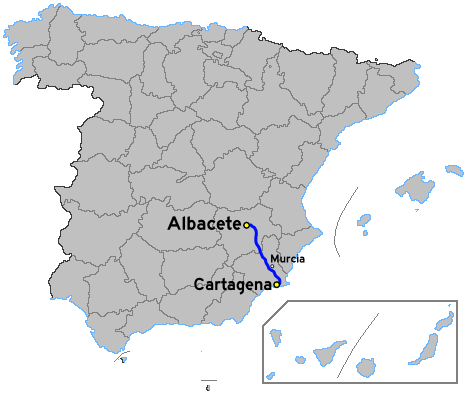

Route information
- Length: 190 km (120 mi)

Major junctions
- From: Albacete
- To: Cartagena

Location
- Country: Spain

Highway system
- Highways in Spain; Autopistas and autovías; National Roads

The Autovía A-30 (also called Autovía de Murcia) is a Spanish autovía which starts in Albacete and ends in Cartagena, while also passing through Murcia. It replaced most of the eastern section of the former N-301 road.

== History ==
The A-30 motorway is part of an axis that follows the itinerary of the old N-301 national road that connects Ocaña with Cartagena, although the A-30 refers only to the section between Albacete and Cartagena, the rest of sections of this national They have been renamed as another highway ( A-31 ), or the N-301 still remains as a highway, although from Ocaña to La Roda there is a toll highway called ( AP-36 ) that runs parallel to the national highway . The N-301 was the axis that linked Madrid with Albacete, Murcia and Cartagena.

Returning to the A-30, the section between Albacete and Murcia, new layout, began to build in the late nineties, opening several sections until July 21, 2001, the last remaining section was opened.

The section between Murcia and Cartagena, which opened in 1993, is for the most part a split of the old N-301. What's more, this section kept the name of N-301 until the change of name of roads in 2004.
