= Autovía A-31 =

Motorway from Atalaya del Cañavate to Alicante (Spain)

Coordinates: 38°20′05″N 0°30′38″W

Autovía A-31
- Autovía de Alicante
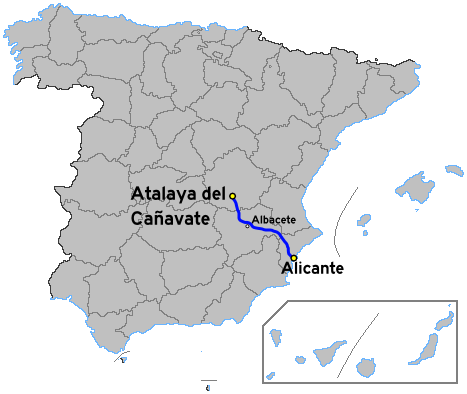

Route information
- Part of E903
- Length: 239 km (149 mi)

Major junctions
- From: Atalaya del Cañavate
- To: Alicante

Location
- Country: Spain

Highway system
- Highways in Spain; Autopistas and autovías; National Roads

The Autovía A-31, also known as the Autovía de Alicante, is a highway in Spain. The road connects Madrid to Alicante.

It starts at a junction with the Autovía A-3 at Alarcón and heads south east to Albacete. Thereafter the Autovía A-30 branches off to Murcia. The A-31 heads east to Almansa and a junction with the Autovía A-35 before heading to the coast the Autovía A-7 and Alicante.

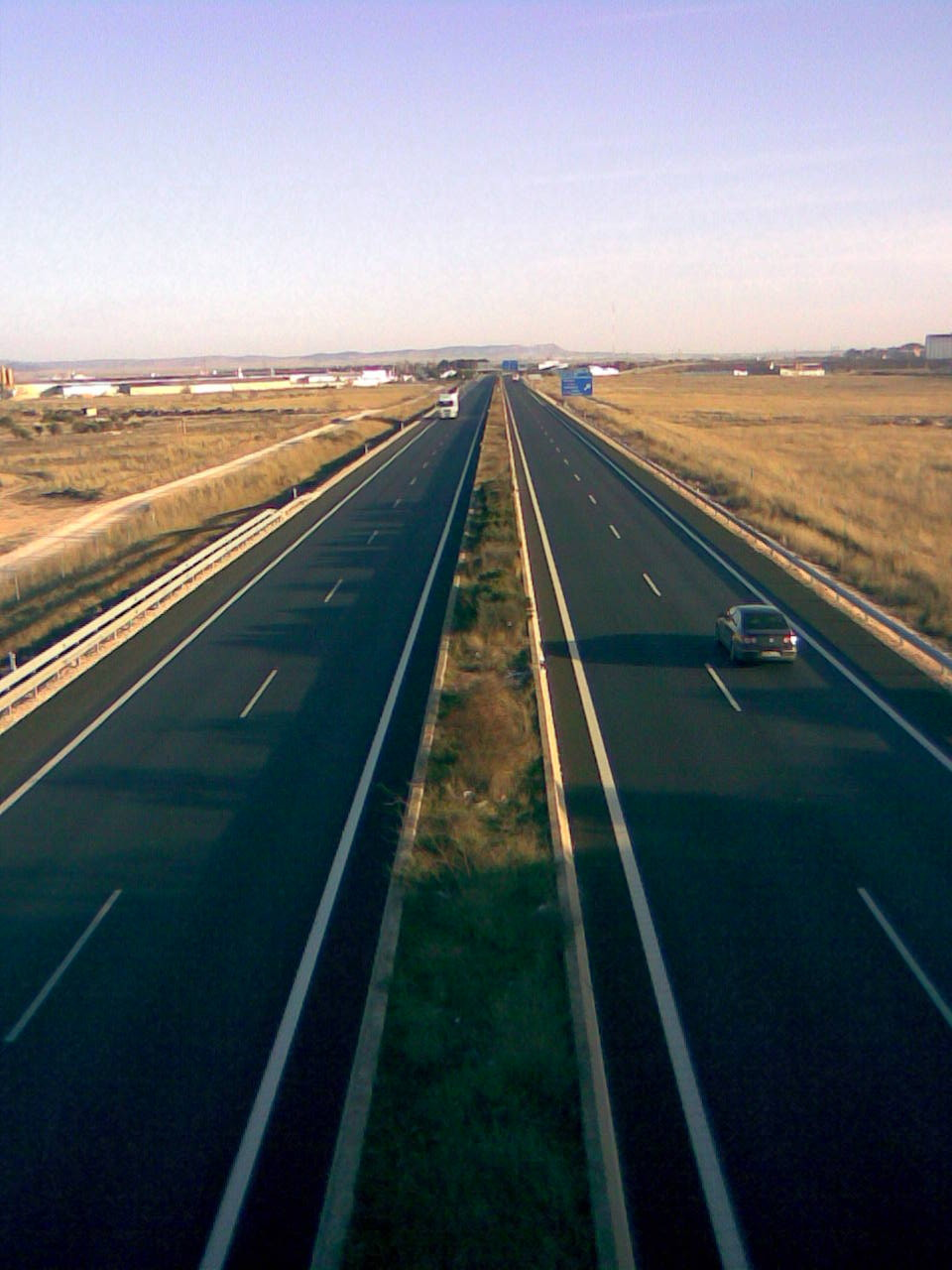
Autovía A-31 in Albacete
