= Autovía A-3 =

Road in trans-European E-road network

Autovía A-3
- Autovía del Este

Route information
- Part of E901
- Length: 354.98 km (220.57 mi)

Major junctions
- From: Madrid
- To: Valencia

Location
- Country: Spain

Highway system
- Highways in Spain; Autopistas and autovías; National Roads

The Autovía A-3 (also called Autovía del Este) (Valencian: Autovia de l’Est) is a Spanish autovía that starts in Madrid and ends in Valencia. It is the shortest of the six radial autovías stemming from Madrid, at 355 km (220.5 miles), and the entirety of the route forms the entirety of the European route E901, a B class road in the International E-road network.

The Autovía A-3 was inaugurated on 3 December 1998.

== Sections ==
#	From	To	Length	Signal
1	Madrid	Rivas-Vaciamadrid	22.38 km	A-3 / E 901
2	Rivas-Vaciamadrid	Arganda del Rey	5.43 km	A-3 / E 901
3	Arganda del Rey	Tarancón	59.59 km	A-3 / E 901
4	Tarancón	Motilla del Palancar	130.67 km	A-3 / E 901
5	Motilla del Palancar	Utiel	69.23 km	A-3 / E 901
6	Utiel	Requena	14.54 km	A-3 / E 901
7	Requena	Valencia	67.56 km	A-3 / E 901

== Major cities crossed ==
- Madrid
- Arganda del Rey
- Tarancón
- Honrubia
- Motilla del Palancar
- Minglanilla
- Utiel
- Requena
- Buñol
- Cheste
- Valencia

== Route ==
- Spain
  - / E901: Madrid ( E5 / E90) – Atalaya del Cañavate ( E903)– Valencia ( E15)
