= List of national roads in Spain =

The Carreteras Nacionales de España or National Roads of Spain are roads of governmental property, managed by the Ministry of Development (Spain) and form the Red de Carreteras del Estado or State Roads Network. A road numbering scheme is used according to rules by the fourth General Road Plan (Plan General de Carreteras) of 1939-1941 (Plan Peña). Six radial roads which connect Madrid with its coasts and its borders divide the Spanish continental territory (except for the Canary Islands and Balearic Islands) into 6 radial sectors. These radial roads are enumerated in clockwise fashion as follows:

- N-I from Madrid to France via Irún or Carretera de Burgos: Northbound
- N-II from Madrid to France via La Jonquera or Carretera de Barcelona: North-eastbound
- N-III from Madrid to Valencia or Carretera de Valencia: Eastbound
- N-IV from Madrid to Cádiz or Carretera de Andalucía: Southbound
- N-V from Madrid to the Portuguese border or Carretera de Extremadura: Westbound
- N-VI from Madrid to A Coruña or Carretera de A Coruña: North-westbound.

The national roads were upgraded to Autovías, and changed their name to their geographical destination instead of the city they link to Madrid, and not varying their number (A-1, A-2,...).

The code for the national roads consists of 3 digits (e.g.: N-XXX, where X is a number) assigned as follows:

- The first digit represents the number of the sector of origin: those roads starting between N-I and N-II are designated as N-1XX; those between N-II and N-III, N-2XX etc.
- The second number represents the straight line distance in hundreds of kilometers starting at the Puerta del Sol, Madrid. Thus, if the road starts less than 100 km away the road is assigned the number 0; 1 if originating between 100 and 200 km away from Madrid, and so on.
- The third digit reflects its direction: An odd number is assigned if the road is radial that is emanating from Madrid; if it is a transversal road not leading to Madrid, it is assigned an even number, including 0. For a radial road the origin is set as the closest end to Madrid; for a transversal road, the origin is set at the end which leads into a counterclockwise direction.

For example:

- The road which links Cordoba and Tarragona via Cuenca is not a radial road. It starts in Córdoba so the direction is anti-clockwise (from the South to the North-East). Córdoba is between N-IV and N-V, and Córdoba is 295 km away from Madrid, so the first two numbers are N-42X. The third number is an even number, which in this case is 0. So the road from Córdoba to Tarragona via Cuenca is N-420.
- The road which links Madrid and Ciudad Real via Toledo diverts from N-IV (N-4XX) in Madrid (N-X0X), and it is a radial road (odd number). Consequently, its code is N-401.

Some exceptions apply for roads within Basque Country or Navarra, where another numbering scheme applies (e.g.: N-102).

== Table ==
Signal	Itinerary
A-1	Madrid-Aranda de Duero-Burgos-Vitoria-San Sebastián-Irún-French border
N-110	Soria-San Esteban de Gormaz-Segovia-Ávila-Plasencia
N-111	Medinaceli-Soria-Logroño-Pamplona
N-113	Ágreda-Valtierra (Hostal Los Abetos)
N-120	Logroño-Burgos-León-Ourense-Vigo
N-121	Pamplona-Valtierra (Hostal Los Abetos)
N-121a	Behobia-Pamplona
N-121b	Dancharinea-Oronoz
N-121c	Tudela-Tarazona
N-122	Gallur-Tarazona-Soria-Aranda de Duero-Valladolid-Zamora-Portugal
N-123	Benabarre-Barbastro
N-124	Ollauri-Miranda de Ebro
N-135	Pamplona-French border
N-138	Estéribar (Zubiri)-French border
N-141	Vic-La Riba-Manresa-Girona-French border
N-145	La Seu d'Urgell-Andorra
N-152	Ripoll-Vic-French border
A-2	Madrid-Zaragoza-Lleida-Barcelona-Girona-French border
N-204	Sacedón-Almadrones
N-211	Alcolea del Pinar-Monreal-Alcañiz-Caspe-Fraga
N-225	Teruel-Grao de Castellón (overlaps with the N-340 in sections)
N-230	Lleida-French border
N-232	Cabañas de Virtus-Pancorbo-Logroño-Zaragoza-Vinaròs
N-234	Sagunto-Teruel-Burgos
N-236	AP-2-Lleida
N-237	Sagunto-Puerto de Sagunto
N-238	AP-7-Vinaròs
N-240	Tarragona-Lleida-Huesca-Jaca-Pamplona-Altsasu
N-260	Portbou-Figueres-Puigcerdà-La Seu d'Urgell-Sort-La Pobla de Segur-Castejón de Sos-Campo-Aínsa-Broto-Biescas-Sabiñánigo
A-3	Madrid-Valencia
N-301	Ocaña-La Roda-Murcia-Cartagena
N-310	Manzanares-Villanueva de la Jara
N-320	La Gineta-Cuenca-Guadalajara-Venturada
N-322	Bailén-Albacete-Requena
N-323	Bailén-Jaén-Granada-Motril
N-325	Novelda-Crevillente
N-330	Alicante-Almansa-Requena-Utiel-Teruel-Zaragoza-Huesca-Jaca-French border
N-331	Córdoba-Málaga
N-332	Vera-Cartagena-Alicante-Valencia
N-335	V-30 - Puerto de Valencia
N-340	San Fernando-Algeciras-Málaga-Motril-Almería-Murcia-Elche-Alicante-Sant Joan d'Alacant-Castelló de la Plana-Tarragona-Barcelona
N-341	Venta del Pobre-Carboneras
N-343	Alumbres-Escombreras
N-344	Almería-Alcantarilla-Fuente Encarroz
N-345	La Unión-Portmán
N-350	N-340-Puerto de Algeciras (Sur)
N-351	San Roque-Gibraltar
N-357	A-7-Puerto de Algeciras (Norte)
A-4	Madrid-Córdoba-Sevilla-Cádiz
N-400	Toledo-Aranjuez-Ocaña-Tarancón-Cuenca
A-402	Madrid-Toledo-Ciudad Real. After km 78 of the A-42 it splits into two roads: N-401 and Autovía de los Viñedos.
N-403	Toledo-Maqueda-Ávila-Adanero
N-420	Montoro-Ciudad Real-Puerto Lápice-Alcázar de San Juan-Cuenca-Ademuz-Teruel-Montalbán-Valdealgorta-Reus-Tarragona
N-431	Sevilla-Huelva-Portugal
N-432	Badajoz-Zafra-Córdoba-Granada
N-433	Las Nieves-Portugal
N-435	La Albuera-Jerez de los Caballeros-Fregenal de la Sierra-San Juan del Puerto
N-441	Peguerillas-Huelva
N-442	Huelva-San José
N-443	Puerto Real-Cádiz
A-5	Madrid-Mérida-Badajoz-Portugal
N-501	Ávila-Peñaranda de Bracamonte-Salamanca
N-502	La Serrada (Ávila)-Talavera de la Reina-Alcaudete de la Jara-Herrera del Duque-Almadén-Espiel
N-521	Trujillo-Cáceres-Valencia de Alcántara-Portugal
N-525	Benavente-Ourense-Santiago de Compostela
N-532	Verín-Portugal
N-536	Ponferrada-A Rúa
N-540	Lugo-Ourense
N-541	Ourense-O Carballiño-Pontevedra
N-547	Guntín-Lavacolla
N-550	A Coruña-Santiago de Compostela-Pontevedra-Vigo-Tui
N-551	Tui-Portugal
N-552	Vigo- Port
N-553	AP-9-N-550
N-554	N-550-Redondela
N-557	A Coruña- Port
A-6	Madrid-Medina del Campo-Benavente-Ponferrada-Lugo-A Coruña
N-601	Adanero-Olmedo-Valladolid-Medina de Rioseco-León
N-603	Los Ángeles de San Rafael-Segovia
N-610	Palencia-Paradores de Castrogonzalo
N-611	Santander-Torrelavega-Palencia-Venta de Baños
N-620	Burgos-Venta de Baños-Valladolid-Tordesillas-Salamanca-Ciudad Rodrigo-Portugal
N-621	Unquera-León
N-623	Burgos-Santander
N-625	Mansilla de las Mulas-Cistierna-Riaño-Arriondas
N-627	Aguilar de Campoo-San Miguel de Ubierna
N-629	Colindres-San Miguel de Ubierna
N-630	Gijón-Oviedo-Mieres-Puerto de Pajares-León-Zamora-Salamanca-Plasencia-Cáceres-Mérida-Seville
N-631	Embalse de Ricobayo-Rionegro del Puente
N-632	Luarca-Avilés-Gijón-Ribadesella
N-634	Santiago de Compostela-Oviedo-Torrelavega-Bilbao-San Sebastián
N-635	Muriedas-Solares
N-636	S-10-Aeropuerto de Santander
N-640	O Hospital-Lalín-A Estrada-Vilagarcía de Arousa
N-641	Gijón-El Musel
N-642	Ferrol-Vegadeo
N-643	Folgueras-Aeropuerto de Asturias
N-651	Betanzos-Ferrol

== See also ==
- Highways in Spain
