= Highways in Spain =

Highway network in Spain. The key reads as follows: "Autovía and autopista network" "Tolled autopistas" "State autopistas and autovías" "Autonomously tolled autopistas" "Autonomic autopistas and autovías" "Insular autovías and autopistas"

The Spanish motorway (highway) network is the third largest in the world, by length. As of 2025, there are 17,228 km (10,705 mi) of High Capacity Roads (Spanish: Vías de Gran Capacidad) in the country. There are two main types of such roads, autopistas and autovías, which differed in the strictness of the standards they are held to.

== History ==
Between 1990 and 2012 Spain had one of the highest rates of motorway growth in Europe.

The first motorways named autopista were financed using sovereign debt.

At the end of the 1980s, and before Olympic Games in 1992 in Barcelona, the autonomous Catalan government was interested in increasing the speed limit on new motorways. Between 1987 and 1990, the operations at four new motorways were transferred to private companies, three by the Catalan region and one by the national government.

Building of new sections of autovia was increased before the 1992 Olympic Games and the Sevilla World Fair.

The 1984-1992 National Plan built around 3500 kilometers of new autovia, to reach a network length of 6000 kilometres by 1992, at a cost of 184 million pesetas (around 1 million euros). At the same time, the new autovia standard was closer to the autopista standard, as the old autovia standard was understood as not providing enough safety. This generated increasing project costs.

Since traffic density is generally lower in Spain than France, it was required that some motorways were to be untolled. Despite a lower traffic density, Spanish motorways remain profitable, because tolls are twice higher in Spain than in France.

Between 2005 and 2014, Spain was the EU country which best performed for decreasing fatalities on motorways, with a decrease score of 66%.

Increase of the Spanish motorway network

The length of motorways and other roads is expressed in kilometers. It was reported as of 31 December 2015.
Sources:
- Eurostat (road_if_motorwa serie)
- Rac foundation (EU) (some years only)

== Differences between autopista and autovía ==
Road traffic sign of border with Spain.

Beginning of autopista sign.

Beginning of autovía sign.

The distinction between two kinds of high capacity roads is mainly a historical one, seldom with practical consequences for most but the oldest motorways. Both kinds are divided highways with full access control and at least two lanes per direction. General speed limits for both are mandated by the Spanish Traffic Law as 60–120 km/h (35–75 mph), though there are groups that ask for the latter to be raised to 140 km/h (85 mph). Specific limits may be imposed based on road, meteorologic or traffic conditions.

Autopistas are specifically reserved for automobile travel, so all vehicles not able to sustain at least 60 km/h (35 mph) are banned from them. Thus, they may not be an upgrade to an older road, since the Spanish legislation requires an alternative route to be provided for such vehicles. Many, but not all, autopistas are toll roads, which also mandates an alternative toll-free route (though not necessarily a freeway) under the Spanish laws. An example is the AP-2 toll autopista, which links Zaragoza with Barcelona through the Monegros desert. In this case, the alternative is the N-II, the national road that preceded the A-2 autovía.

On the other hand, autovías are usually (though not always) upgrades from older roads, and always untolled. In general, slow vehicles like bicycles and agricultural machinery are allowed under certain restrictions so as to not disrupt the traffic excessively or cause any danger. Furthermore, an autovía will most likely follow the original road very closely, only deviating from it to bypass the towns (which are looped around in variantes). Thus, the upgraded road usually serves as the base for one of the two directions of the new autovía, which means the turns can be steeper than in autopistas. All in all, an autovía:

- Allows traffic banned from an autopista, like bicycles. However, if the autovía is built as a new road instead of an upgrade to an older one, this traffic may be banned too.
- May have little to no hard shoulders, which are then marked with a solid line instead of the broken line of a transitable hard shoulder.
- May have acceleration and deceleration lanes that are much shorter than those of autopistas.
- May have tighter turns and steeper gradients than an autopista is allowed to.
- If space-constrained, it may even have bus stops on a service lane in the autovía itself, as opposed to requiring them to be placed on a service lane physically separated from the main road.
- Also if extremely space-constrained, there can be acceleration and deceleration lanes merging on the left lane of the autovía.

However, most of the situations listed here only apply to the oldest autovías, and mainly to the radial A-1 through A-6 plus the A-42 near their endpoints, which were the first to be twinned in the 60s into dual carriageways (with at-level intersections) and then were upgraded to limited-access freeways in the 70s-80s, keeping most of their old route unchanged except where the old national road ventured into towns. In those cases, the freeway would make a semi-loop called a variante around the town, leaving the old national road as the access between the freeway and the town.

New autovías usually have perfectly normal acceleration and deceleration lanes, very safe turns and transitable shoulders. Thus, the practical difference between a "new" autovía and a generic autopista is mainly the frequency of exits, which is usually higher in an autovía - upgraded from an old road with many crosses - than in a new, purpose-designed autopista with fewer preconditions imposed on it.

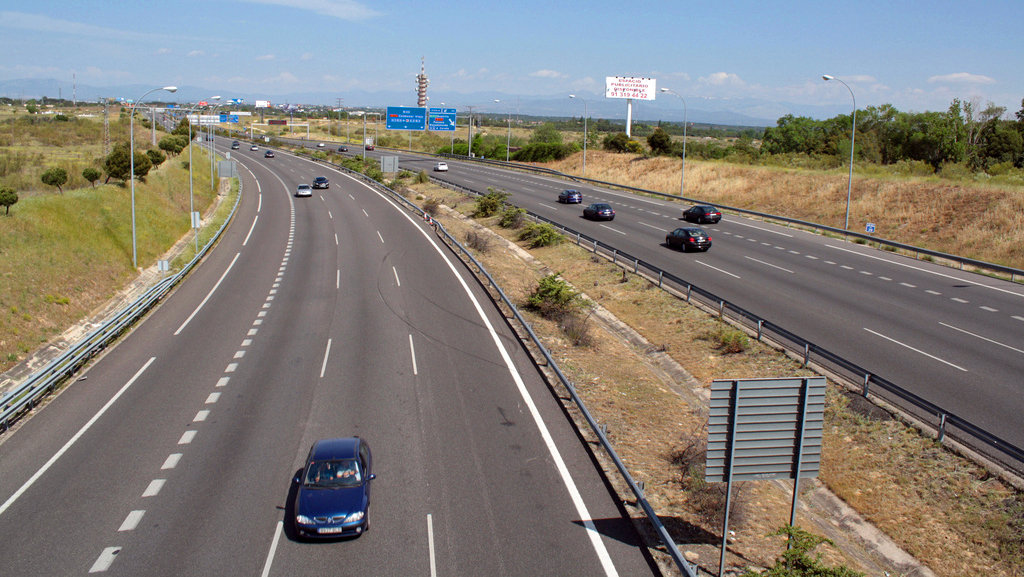
The M-40 autopista is one of the beltways serving Madrid. It is one of the few non-toll autopistas of significant length

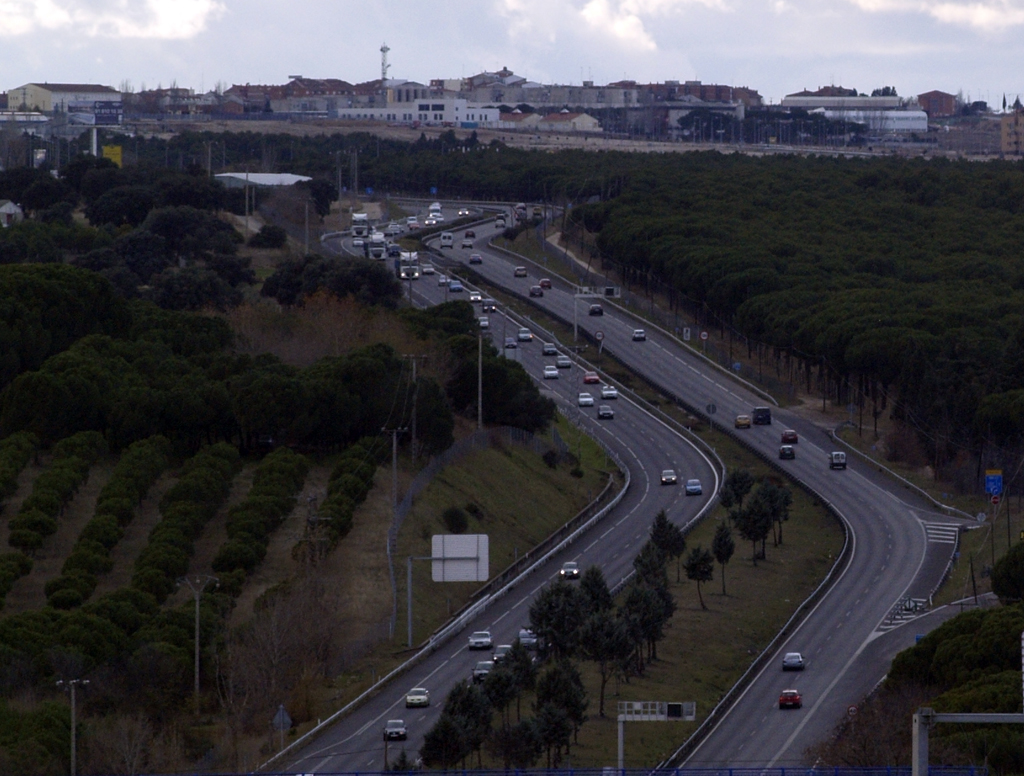
The A-5 autovía near Navalcarnero, Madrid. Note the mostly nonexistent acceleration lane in the road joining from the bottom right

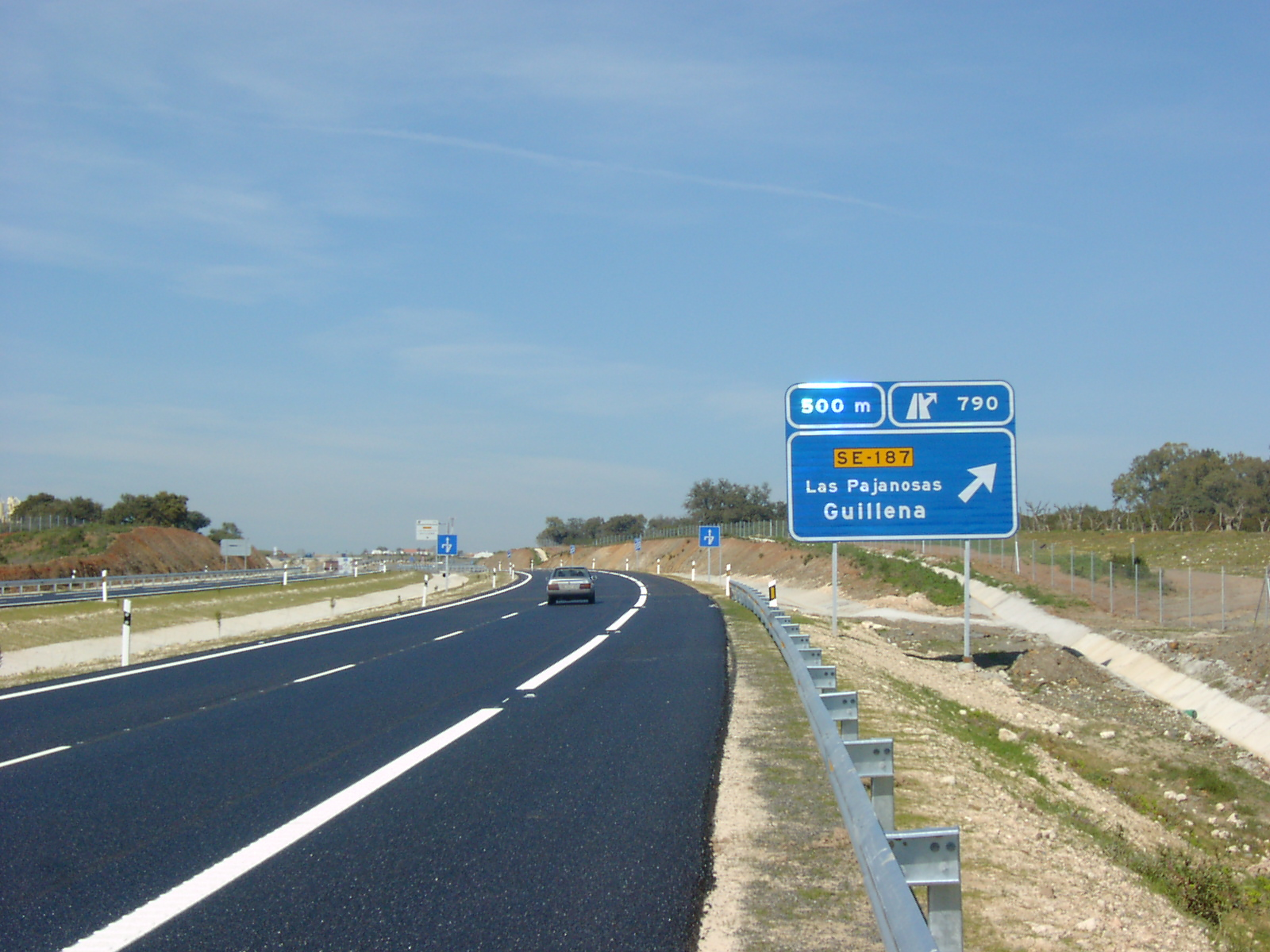
Modern autovías such as the A-66 near Guillena, Seville, offer most, if not all, features that are required by an autopista

== Safety ==
It is considered that the construction of motorways has helped to increase safety in Spanish roads, while generating a traffic increase.

Fatalities on motorways have decreased from 776 in 2006 to 277 in 2015.

Spain is one of the countries of the EU with most of the road fatalities occurring on motorways rather than on other roads: 16% in 2015. But the same year, taking into account the fact that Spain has a larger network of road than motorways, Spain is one of the countries with the lowest motorway fatality-rates per 1.000 km of motorways, after Finland, Denmark, Croatia, and Hungary: 18.1 fatalities per 1000 kilometers of motorways.

== Effective speed ==
Source:

== Colour code ==
Spain uses this color code for highways.

- Blue for motorways owned by the national government or private companies (tolled). Some regional governments also use blue.
- Red for all other roads owned by the national government.
- Orange for first-tier roads owned by regional governments.
- Green for second-tier roads owned by regional governments.
- Yellow for third-tier roads owned by regional governments, and for roads owned by provincial governments.

== State-managed motorways ==
Most of the high capacity roads in Spain are under the authority of the General Roads Directorate (Spanish: Dirección General de Carreteras) of the Ministry of Public Works, a department of the central Government of Spain, with the exceptions of Navarre and the Basque Country, the only autonomous communities which have been transferred full powers over all roads in their territories. Usually, the DGC manages all road maintenance, but in the case of the tolled autopistas, the management is commonly delegated to the concessionaire company.

Traditionally, purpose-built autopistas or autovías were assigned names starting with A plus one or two numbers describing their general orientation, while upgraded autovías kept their original names. Thus, the freeway that is currently known as A-5 was still reported as N-V in road signs for years after the upgrade was completed, making it difficult for drivers to know in advance which roads had become autovías. However, in 2003 all Spanish motorways were uniformly renamed with the following criteria:

- Interurban free-to-use motorways are named "A-" plus:
  - one number, if it is one of the major axes of Spain, being A-1 to A-6 the six radial highways stemming from Madrid, A-7 the highway through the Mediterranean coast, and A-8 the highway through the Cantabrian (northern) coast. Number 9 is reserved for the highway through the Atlantic coast of Galicia, but it is a toll road, so it is named AP-9 (see below).
  - two numbers, elsewhere.
- Beltways are named with a one or two letter code identifying the city they orbit, plus two digits indicative of the general distance. For example, the M-50 is further from the city of Madrid than the M-40.
- City access motorways are named similarly to beltways, like TO-21 for a freeway leaving the A-40 towards Toledo.
- Tolled motorways add a "P" (thus, "AP-") before the dash, and must be clearly identified as such in road signs. For example, AP-9.
  - An exception to this naming rule are the radial toll motorways starting in Madrid, R-2 through R-5

All such names are posted in white letters on blue background, like: A-49 or AP-4 . Note that none of these naming and coloring requisites affect roads under the authority of the Autonomous Communities. For example, the A-8 road in the Basque Country is a tolled autopista, as are the C-16, C-32 and C-33 in Catalonia. Other communities such as Madrid do follow the convention, and have names as MP-203 for a tolled road and M-501 for a free autovía. Furthermore, roads under the authority of the Andalusian government also start with A, but they have longer numeric codes and different coloring.

=== Interurban motorways ===
Map of Spanish autovias and autopistas

The roads listed below form the backbone of the Spanish high capacity network, connecting all provincial capitals and other major towns and destinations. Until recently, the network suffered from a high radiality, which collapsed the several Madrid beltways and the roads into the city and region. Since the 2000s, an effort to improve the situation was made based on two actions:

- Build a new set of radial autopistas (named R-n instead of A-n) complementary to the old radial autovías near Madrid. Such tolled autopistas would form a new system of accesses to the capital that merges with their autovía counterparts far from Madrid. The main advantage to these roads is that they allow true fast travel from the first kilometre, while the radial autovías near Madrid (among the oldest autovía stretches in Spain) frequently go through populations, have constant entries and exits and suffer several other conditions which both jam them and make their first kilometres limited to speeds well under the normal 120 km/h (75 mph) limit.
- Invest heavily in de-radialization efforts that create true cross-country high-capacity axes without passing through Madrid. For example, the A-66 (Autovía Ruta de la Plata) which connects the southern Andalusia with the northwest area of the country, or the A-43 which will connect the western Extremadura region with the east of Spain.

*: under construction

†: planned

Sign	Denomination	Itinerary
A-1	Autovía del Norte	Madrid (M-30, M-40) — Alcobendas/San Sebastián de los Reyes (M-12) — M-50 — El Molar (R-1) — Aranda de Duero (A-11) — Burgos West (BU-30) — AP-1 — Burgos Northeast (BU-30) — N-I/AP-1
R-1	Autopista Radial 1	Madrid (M-12) — † — M-50 — † — El Molar (A-1)
AP-1	Autopista del Norte	Burgos (A-1) — N-I/A-1 — Briviesca — Pancorbo — Miranda de Ebro (AP-68) — Armiñón (N-I/A-1)
A-2	Autovía del Nordeste	Madrid (M-30, M-40, M-22) — Coslada/San Fernando de Henares — Torrejón de Ardoz (M-50) — Alcalá de Henares (M-203/M-100) — Guadalajara (R-2) — Medinaceli (A-15) — Zaragoza (Z-40, A-68) — AP-2 Fraga — AP-2 — Lleida (A-22, LL-11) — Cervera (C-25) — Martorell (AP-7) — B-23 — L'Hospitalet de Llobregat (B-10); Tordera (C-32) — * — Caldes de Malavella — Fornells de la Selva — † — Girona — † — Figueres — † — France
R-2	Autopista Radial 2	Madrid (M-40)—M-50—Guadalajara A-2
AP-2	Autopista del Nordeste	Zaragoza—Lleida—El Vendrell
A-3	Autovía del Este	Madrid (M-30)—Atalaya del Cañavate—Valencia
R-3	Autopista Radial 3	Madrid (M-30)—Arganda del Rey (A-3)—*—Tarancón(A-3)
A-4	Autovía del Sur	Madrid (M-30)—Córdoba—Seville, Jerez de la Frontera—A-48
R-4	Autopista Radial 4	Madrid (M-50)—Aranjuez—Ocaña (A-4/A-40/AP-36)
AP-4	Autopista del Sur	Seville—Cádiz
A-5	Autovía del Suroeste	Madrid (M-30)—Talavera de la Reina—Navalmoral de la Mata(EX-A-1)—Trujillo(A-58)—Mérida—Badajoz—Portugal
R-5	Autopista Radial 5	Madrid (M-40)—Navalcarnero (A-5)
A-6	Autovía del Noroeste	Madrid—Villalba, Adanero—Tordesillas—Benavente—Lugo—A Coruña
AP-6	Autopista del Noroeste	Villalba—Adanero
A-7	Autovía del Mediterráneo	Tarragona—L'Hospitalet de l'Infant, Puçol—Valencia—Silla, Crevillent—Murcia—Almería—Motril—Málaga—Algeciras
AP-7	Autopista del Mediterráneo	France—La Jonquera—Girona—Barcelona—Tarragona—Puçol, Silla—Alicante, Crevillent—Cartagena—Vera, Málaga—Guadiaro
A-8	Autovía del Cantábrico	Bilbao—Castro Urdiales—Laredo—Torrelavega—Llanes—Villaviciosa—Gijón—Avilés—Luarca—Navia—Ribadeo—Mondoñedo—Vilalba—Baamonde
AP-8	Autopista AP-8	Bilbao—Irun
AP-9	Autopista del Atlántico	Ferrol—A Coruña—Santiago—Pontevedra—Vigo—Tui (A-55)
A-11	Autovía del Duero	Soria–*–Aranda de Duero—*—Valladolid–Tordesillas—Toro—Zamora—*—Portugal
A-12	Autovía del Camino de Santiago	Pamplona—Logroño—*—Burgos
A-13	Autovía A-13	Acceso Sureste-Nordeste de Logroño—*—Soria
A-14	Autovía de la Ribagorza	Lleida—Almenar—*—Vielha—†—France
A-15	Autovía de Navarra	Medinaceli—Soria—*—Tudela—Tafalla-Pamplona—Irurtzun—Villabona-Andoain-Hernani-Donostia/San Sebastián
A-21	Autovía del Pirineo	Pamplona—*—Jaca
A-22	Autovía Huesca-Lleida	Lleida—Monzón—Siétamo—*—Huesca
A-23	Autovía Mudéjar	Sagunto—Teruel—Zaragoza—Huesca—Jaca (N-330)
A-24	Autovía Daroca-Burgos	Daroca—*—Calatayud—*—Soria—*—Burgos
A-25	Autovía A-25	Alcolea—Monreal
A-26	Autovía del Eje Pirenaico	Besalú—Olot
A-27	Autovía Tarragona-Lleida	Tarragona—Valls—*—Montblanc (AP-2)
A-28	Autovía de la Alcarria	Guadalajara—Tarancón
A-30	Autovía de Murcia	Albacete (A-31)—Murcia—Cartagena
A-31	Autovía de Alicante	Atalaya del Cañavate (A-3)—La Roda—Albacete—Almansa—Alicante
A-32	Autovía Linares-Albacete	Bailén—Linares—*—Albacete
A-33	Autovía Cieza-Font de la Figuera	Cieza—Jumilla—*—Yecla—*—Font de la Figuera
A-34	Autovía A-34	L'Hospitalet de l'Infant—*—Vila-Seca
A-35	Autovía Almansa-Xàtiva	Almansa (A-31)—Xàtiva (A-7)
AP-36	Autopista Ocaña-La Roda	Ocaña (A-4/R-4)—Quintanar de la Orden—La Roda (A-31)
AP-37	Autopista Alicante-Murcia	Alicante—†—Murcia
A-38	Autovía A-38	Valencia (AP-7)—Cullera—*—Gandia
A-40	Autovía de Castilla-La Mancha	Ávila—*—Maqueda—Toledo—*—Ocaña—Tarancón—Cuenca—*—Teruel
AP-41	Autopista AP-41	Madrid (R-5)—Toledo, Almadén—*—Espiel
A-42	Autovía de Toledo	Madrid—Toledo
A-43	Autovía Extremadura-Comunidad Valenciana	Mérida—*—Ciudad Real—Manzanares—Villarrobledo—Atalaya del Cañavate (A-3)
A-44	Autovía de Sierra Nevada	Bailén (A-4)—Jaén—Granada—Motril (A-7)
A-45	Autovía de Málaga	Córdoba (A-4)—Antequera—Málaga (A-7)
AP-46	Autopista AP-46	Puerto de las Pedrizas (A-45)—Málaga (A-7)
A-48	Autovía A-48	Cádiz—Algeciras
A-49	Autovía del Quinto Centenario	Seville—Huelva—Ayamonte—Portugal
A-50	Autovía de la Cultura	Ávila–Salamanca
AP-51	Conexión Ávila	Villacastín (AP-6)–Ávila
A-52	Autovía de las Rías Bajas	Benavente–Ourense–O Porriño (A-55)
AP-53	Autopista Central Gallega	Ourense–Santiago
A-54	Autovía A-54	Lugo–*–Santiago
A-55	Autovía del Atlántico	Vigo–O Porriño–Tui–Portugal
A-56	Autovía A-56	Guntín de Pallares–*–Ourense
A-57	Autovía A-57	A Cañiza–*–Pontevedra
A-58	Autovía Trujillo - Cáceres	Trujillo (A-5)–Cáceres
A-59	Autovía Pontevedra-Vigo	Vilaboa–†–Peinador
A-60	Autovía A-60	Valladolid–*–León
AP-61	Conexión Segovia	San Rafael (AP-6)–Segovia
A-62	Autovía de Castilla	Burgos–Valladolid–Salamanca–Fuentes de Oñoro–Portugal
A-63	Autovía A-63	Oviedo–La Espina
A-64	Autovía A-64	Villaviciosa–Oviedo
A-65	Autovía A-65	Benavente–*–Palencia
A-66	Autovía Ruta de la Plata	Northern span: Gijón (A-8) — AS-II — Oviedo (A-66a, A-63) — AP-66/N-630 Southern span: La Robla (N-630) — † — León (AP-66/AP-71, A-231) — Benavente (A-52/A-6) — Zamora (A-11) — Salamanca (A-62) — Plasencia (EX-A1) — Cáceres — Mérida (A-5) — Seville (SE-30)
AP-66	Autopista Ruta de la Plata	Campomanes (A-66/N-630) — León (A-66/AP-71)
A-67	Autovía Cantabria-Meseta	Santander–*–Torrelavega–Reinosa—Aguilar de Campóo—Palencia–Venta de Baños—A-62
AP-68	Autopista Vasco-aragonesa	Bilbao–Miranda de Ebro-Logroño–Tudela-Zaragoza
AP-71	Autopista León - Astorga	León (A-66/AP-66/LE-30)–Astorga (A-6)
A-72	Autovía A-72	Monforte de Lemos–*–Chantada
A-73	Autovía A-73	Burgos–*–Aguilar de Campoo
A-74	Autovía A-74	Almadén–*–Autovía A-43
A-75	Autovía Verín - Frontera Portuguesa	Verín (A-52)–Portugal
A-76	Autovía A-76	Ponferrada–*–Ourense
A-78	Autovía A-78	Crevillent–Elche
A-79	Vía Parque Alicante-Elche	Alicante–Elche
A-80	Autovía del Sella	Ribadesella–*–Cangas de Onís
A-91	Autovía A-91	Puerto Lumbreras–Vélez Rubio

=== Beltways, city accesses and urban highways ===
Most beltways, full or partial, have originated from the upgrading of one or several roads reaching the town to the autovía level, as the several variantes looping around the town were joined in a single beltway that received a new naming such as TO-20 or Z-40. The list below only contains roads that are recognized as autovías or autopistas for at least part of its length, thus disqualifying urban arteries with at-grade intersections or unrestricted direct access to the main lanes, which are better represented by the dual carriageway concept.

Region	Signal	Denomination	Itinerary
A Coruña	AC-10	A Coruña Inner Beltway	AC-11—AC-12
A Coruña	AC-11	Access to A Coruña from AP-9	Avda. Alfonso Molina
A Coruña	AC-12	Access to A Coruña from N-VI	San Pedro de Nos (N-VI)—A Coruña docks
A Coruña	AC-14	Southern access from A-6	A-6—A Coruña
Alicante	A-70	Alicante First Beltway	Campello (AP-7)—Elche (A-7)
Alicante	A-77	North east route to Alicante	Alicante (A-70)—A-7
Almería	AL-12	Eastern access to Almería	El Toyo (A-7)—Airport—Almería
Almería	AL-14	Almería docks access	A-7—Almería docks
Ávila	AV-20	Ávila Beltway	AP-51—N-110
Avilés	AI-81	Eastern access to Avilés	A-8—Avilés
Barcelona	B-10	Barcelona Coastal Beltway	—
Barcelona	B-20	Barcelona Inner Beltway	—
Barcelona	B-21	Second access to Barcelona Airport	*
Barcelona	B-22	Access to Barcelona Airport	C-32—C-31—Barcelona Airport
Barcelona	B-23	Access to Western Barcelona from AP-7	Molins de Rei (AP-2, AP-7)—B-20—Avda. Diagonal
Barcelona	B-24	Autovía B-24	Vallirana (N-340)—Molins de Rei (A-2)
Barcelona	B-30	AP-7 outer lanes	Molins de Rei (A-2)—C-58
Barcelona	B-40	Barcelona Metropolitan Beltway	Abrera (AP-7)—La Roca del Vallés (C-60)
Burgos	BU-11	Autovía BU-11	A-1, BU-30—Burgos
Burgos	BU-30	Burgos Beltway	A-1 Madrid—A-62—A-231—*—N-623—A-1 Vitoria—AP-1
Cádiz	CA-30	Jerez de la Frontera beltway	Jerez Airport (A-4)—A-480—N-IVa—*—A-381
Cádiz	CA-31	Northern access to El Puerto de Santa María	A-4—El Puerto de Santa María
Cádiz	CA-32	Southern access to El Puerto de Santa María	AP-4—El Puerto de Santa María
Cádiz	CA-33	Cádiz to San Fernando	Cádiz—San Fernando (A-4, A-48)
Cádiz	CA-34	Access to Gibraltar	San Roque (A-7)—La Línea de la Concepción—Gibraltar
Cádiz	CA-35	New access to Cádiz via La Pepa Bridge	Puerto Real (AP-4)—Cádiz
Cádiz	CA-36	Old access to Cádiz via Carranza Bridge	Puerto Real (CA-35)—Cádiz
Cádiz	CA-37	Autovía CA-37	Puerto Real (AP-4)—CA-32
Cartagena	CT-31	Western access to Cartagena	AP-7 (815)—Cartagena
Cartagena	CT-32	Eastern access to Cartagena	A-30—AP-7 (800)
Cartagena	CT-33	Access to Cartagena docks	A-30—Cartagena docks
Cartagena	CT-34	Access to Escombreras	A-30—Escombreras Valley industrial area
Castellón de la Plana	CS-22	Access to Castellón docks	N-340—Castellón docks
Córdoba	CO-31	Córdoba Northern Beltway	N-432—A-4
Córdoba	CO-32	Córdoba Western Beltway	A-45 - Córdoba
Cuenca	CU-11	Autovía CU-11	A-40—Cuenca (Avda. República Argentina)
Elche	EL-20	Elche Beltway	A-7—CV-85
Gijón	GJ-81	Autopista GJ-81	A-8—Calle de Sanz Crespo
Granada	GR-14	Western access to Motril port	A-7—Motril port
Granada	GR-16	Eastern access to Motril port	A-7—Motril port
Granada	GR-30	Granada Beltway	A-44—A-92—*—N-432—*—GR-43—*—A-92G—*—A-44
Granada	GR-43	North-western access to Granada	Pinos Puente (N-432)—*—Granada (A-92G)
Huelva	H-30	Huelva Beltway	N-441—H-31—Huelva docks (N-442)
Huelva	H-31	Access to Huelva	A-49—Huelva (H-30)
Jaén	J-12	Northern access to Jaén	A-316—Jaén
León	LE-12	Autovía LE-12	LE-30—LE-20
León	LE-30	León Beltway	A-66—N-630—LE-12
Lleida	LL-11	Eastern access to Lleida	A-2—Lleida (LL-12)
Lleida	LL-12	Southern access to Lleida	AP-2—Lleida (LL-11)
Logroño	LO-20	Logroño Beltway	AP-68—N-232
Lugo	LU-11	Autovía LU-11	Southwest access A-6—Lugo
Lugo	LU-12	Autovía LU-12	A-54—Vilamoure
Lugo	LU-021	Autovía LU-021	East Ring of Lugo N-640—LU-11
Madrid	M-11	Western access to Madrid Airport	M-30 (Manoteras, A-1 junction)—M-40—M-12—M-14-Madrid Airport terminals 1, 2 & 3
Madrid	M-12	Airport Axis Toll Motorway	M-40 (Av. Logroño)—M-11—Airport terminal 4—A-1
Madrid	M-13	Autovía M-13 (Connection between Madrid Airport terminals)	M-14 (Airport terminals 1, 2 & 3) — M-12 (Airport terminal 4)
Madrid	M-14	Southern access to Madrid Airport	M-40 (Metropolitano Stadium) — A-2 (Dwight D. Eisenhower junction) — Airport terminals 1, 2 & 3 — M-13
Madrid	M-21	Access to Coslada and San Fernando de Henares	Madrid (M-40)-Coslada-San Fernando de Henares (M-50)
Madrid	M-22	Eastern access to Madrid Airport	Madrid Airport - Coslada
Madrid	M-23	O'Donnell Axis	Madrid (O'Donnell St.) — M-30 — M-40 (Vicálvaro) — Continues to Arganda del Rey as R-3 (toll)
Madrid	M-30	Calle 30 (Madrid City Center Beltway)	Surrounds the city center of Madrid. Consists of: Avenida de la Paz (Eastern section) A-1/M-11—A-2—M-23—A-3—A-4; Avenida del Manzanares (Western section) A-4-A-42—A-5—M-500—A-6—M-40; Avenida de la Ilustración (Northern section, unfinished) M-40 * M-607 * A-1/M-11
Madrid	M-31	Autovía M-31 (Southeastern link from M-40 to M-50)	M-40 (Mercamadrid/El Pozo del Tío Raimundo)—M-45—M-50 (Perales del Río)
Madrid	M-40	M-40 (Madrid City Beltway)	A-1—R-2—M-11—M-12—A-2/M-21/M-14—M-201—M-23/R-3—A-3—M-31—A-4—A-42—R-5—M-45—A-5—M-501—M-503—A-6—M-30—M-607—A-1; Surrounds most of the city of Madrid and the neighbour town of Pozuelo de Alarcón. Only the Madrid city districts of Barajas, Vicálvaro, Villa de Vallecas and Villaverde fall outside the M-40.
Madrid	M-50	M-50 (Madrid Metropolitan Beltway)	A-1—R-2—M-111—A-2—M-21—M-206—M-45—R-3—A-3—M-31—M-301—A-4—R-4—A-42—M-409—M-407—R-5—M-506—A-5—M-501—M-503—M-505—A-6—*—M-607—*—A-1; Surrounds all the city of Madrid and the neighbouring municipalities of Alcobendas, San Sebastián de los Reyes, Paracuellos del Jarama, Coslada, San Fernando de Henares, Getafe, Leganés, Alcorcón, Boadilla del Monte (part), Majadahonda and Las Rozas de Madrid. The northern section through the Monte de El Pardo park is unfinished.
Málaga	MA-20	Málaga western beltway	Torremolinos (A-7) — Málaga — Málaga
Málaga	MA-21	Málaga to Torremolinos	Torremolinos (A-7) — Málaga Airport — Málaga
Málaga	MA-22	Access to the Port of Málaga	(A-7) — Port of Málaga
Málaga	MA-23	Access to the Málaga Airport	A-7 — Málaga Airport — MA-20
Málaga	MA-24	Eastern access to Málaga	Rincón de la Victoria (A-7) — N-340 — MA-113 — Málaga (A-7)
Málaga	MA-40	Málaga Second Beltway	Torremolinos (A-7) — * — A-404 — * — A-357 — * — AP-46 — * — Málaga (A-7)
Murcia	MU-30	Murcia Beltway	Murcia (A-30) — N-340a — A-7 — C-415
Murcia	RM-1	Santomera-San Javier	San Javier AP-7 — RM-301 — Santomera RM-301 — A-30
Oviedo	O-11	Eastern access to Oviedo	A-66 — Oviedo (Ronda Sur)
Oviedo	O-12	Western access to Oviedo	A-66 — Oviedo (León Avenue)
Oviedo	A-66A	Autovía A-66a	A-66 — Oviedo (Gen. Elorza St.)
Palencia	P-11	Southern access to Palencia	A-67 — Palencia (Madrid Avenue)
Pontevedra	PO-10	Autovía PO-10	PO-11 — AP-9 — N-550
Pontevedra	PO-11	Access to Marín	PO-10 — Marín (port)
Puertollano	PT-10	Northern access to Puertollano	A-41 — Puertollano
Salamanca	SA-11	Northern access to Salamanca	A-62/N-630 - N-620
Salamanca	SA-20	Southern Ring of Salamanca	A-50 — A-66
Santander	S-10	Eastern access to Santander	A-8 — S-30 — CA-141 — N-635 — Santander Airport — A-67 — Santander (N-623, Castilla Avenue)
Santander	S-20	Western access to Santander	A-67 — S-30 — Santander (Constitución Avenue)
Santander	S-30	Santander Bay Ronda	S-20 — A-67 — * — N-623 — * — S-10
Santiago de Compostela	SC-11	Southern access to Santiago	AP-53/AP-9 — SC-20
Santiago de Compostela	SC-20	Autovía SC-20	N-550 — A-54 — AP-9 — SC-11
Santiago de Compostela	SC-21	Access to Santiago Airport	A-54 — Santiago de Compostela Airport
Seville	SE-20	Seville northern beltway	A-4 (North) — Isla de La Cartuja
Seville	SE-30	Seville city beltway	A-4 (North) — A-92 — A-396 — N-IV — A-4 (South) — A-8058 — A-49 — SE-20
Seville	SE-40	Seville metropolitan beltway	*
Soria	SO-20	Autovía SO-20	A-15 — N-122 — N-234
Tarragona	T-11	Autovía Tarragona-Reus	Tarragona (N-241) — A-7 — AP-7 — Reus Airport — C-14/T-315 — Reus (T-310) — N-420a
Toledo	TO-20	Toledo Beltway	N-403a — TO-21 — A-42 — AP-41/TO-22
Toledo	TO-21	Western access to Toledo	A-40 (West) — TO-20
Toledo	TO-22	Eastern access to Toledo	TO-20 — AP-41
Valencia	V-11	Access to Valencia Airport	A-3 — Valencia Airport
Valencia	V-21	North-Eastern access to Valencia	A-7/V-23 (Puzol) — CV-32 — Valencia (Ronda Nord)
Valencia	V-23	Access to Sagunto	A-7/V-21 — A-23 — Sagunto
Valencia	V-30	Valencia Beltway	CV-500 — V-31 — CV-36 — A-3 — CV-30 — V-11 — A-7
Valencia	V-31	Southern access to Valencia (Silla motorway)	A-7 (Silla — V-30
Valladolid	VA-11	Eastern access to Valladolid	A-11 — VA-30 — Valladolid (Soria Avenue)
Valladolid	VA-21	Southern access to Valladolid	N-601 — VA-30 — VA-20 — Valladolid (Madrid Avenue)
Valladolid	VA-20	Valladolid Beltway	—
Valladolid	VA-30	Autovía VA-30	*
Vigo	AP-9V	Access to Vigo from AP-9	AP-9 — Vigo
Vigo	VG-10	Primer cinturón	Castrelos — Bouzas terminal
Vigo	VG-20	Autovía VG-20	VG-10 Navia - AG-57 - AP-9 Rebullon
Zamora	ZA-12	Eastern access to Zamora	A-11 (East) — Zamora (N-122)
Zaragoza	Z-32	Western access to Zaragoza	N-403a — TO-21 — A-42 — AP-41/TO-22
Zaragoza	Z-40	Zaragoza Fourth Beltway	A-2 (West) — AP-68 — A-23 (North)/A-2 (East) — A-68 — A-23 (South) — A-2 (South)
Zaragoza	Z-50	Zaragoza Fifth Beltway	A-2 (East) — A-68 — *

*: under construction

== Regional-managed motorways ==
The formation of the several Autonomous Communities in the early 1980s led to the transfer of many roads to the new regional authorities. Since then, several of those roads have been upgraded to motorway level in order to ensure the internal vertebration of the region, or to provide alternative high-capacity routes to those managed by the national government when those were inadequate or saturated. All of the old comarcal roads (C-nnn) comprising the secondary network were transferred to the Autonomous Communities, splitting them up as necessary; while the national roads (N-nnn) that formed the primary network were mostly kept by the State.

The level of control each community has over its road network varies: the Basque Country and Navarre have received the titularity of nearly all roads in their territories, while in other communities the regional network coexists with and complements the national one. Whatever the extension of the road network under its control, all communities have full powers over naming and identification of their roads, provided no name conflicts with a national road or a regional road of a neighbouring community.

=== Andalusia ===
The regional highway network of Andalusia is very extensive, as the territory itself spans nearly a fifth of Spain. There are no special codes for identifying highways: upgraded roads usually keep their name and sign color (orange, green or yellow). However, confusion sometimes arises due to the fact that most regional roads start with the letter A (for Andalucía), which is also used by the national government for highways.

The most notable Andalusian freeways are the A-92 or Washington Irving's route (with 400 km from Seville to Granada and Almería is the longest regional freeway in Spain), the A-316 & A-318 or Olive Tree's route (200 km from Estepa to Úbeda, still under construction) and the A-381 or Bull's route (90 km from Jerez de la Frontera to Algeciras)

Sign	Type	Denomination	Itinerary
A-92	Interurban	Autovía A-92; Washington Irving's route	Seville — Granada — Almería
A-92C	City access	Autovía A-92C	La Roda de Andalucía(A-92 - SE-497)
A-92G	City access	Autovía A-92G	Santa Fe (A-92) — Granada
A-92M	Interurban	Autovía A-92M	Salinas industrial development (A-92) — Pedrizas pass (A-45/AP-46)
A-92N	Interurban	Autovía A-92N	Guadix (A-92) — Vélez-Rubio (A-91)
A-306	Interurban	Autovía A-306	El Carpio (A-4) — * — Torredonjimeno (A-316)
A-308	Interurban	Autovía A-308	Iznalloz (A-44) — * — Darro (A-92)
A-316	Interurban	Autovía A-316; Autovía del Olivar (east portion)	Úbeda — Baena — * — Jaén (A-44) — Martos — * — Lucena (A-45) — Estepa (A-92)
A-318	Interurban	Autovía A-318; Autovía del Olivar (west portion)	
A-334	Interurban	Autovía del Almanzora	Purchena — * — Fines — Albox — El Cucador — * — A-7
A-357	Interurban	Autovía del Guadalhorce	Zalea — * — Casapalma — MA-40 — Málaga (A-7)
A-376	Interurban	Autovía A-376	Seville (SE-30) — Alcalá de Guadaira/Dos Hermanas — Utrera
A-381	Interurban	Autovía A-381; Ruta del Toro (Bull's route)	Jerez de la Frontera (AP-4) — Los Barrios (A-7)
A-382	Interurban	Autovía A-382	Jerez de la Frontera (AP-4) — Arcos de la Frontera
A-383	City access	Autovía del Higuerón	A-7 — La Línea de la Concepción
A-395	City access	Ronda Sur de Granada	A-44 — Granada
A-480	Interurban	Autovía A-480	Sanlúcar de Barrameda — Jerez de la Frontera (A-4)
A-483	Interurban	Autovía A-483	Bollullos Par del Condado (A-49) — Almonte
A-497	Interurban	Autovía A-497	Huelva — Punta Umbría
A-8057	Urban	Variante de Mairena	San Juan de Aznalfarache (A-8058) — Mairena
A-8058	Urban	Autovía A-8058	Seville (SE-30) — San Juan de Aznalfarache (A-8057)

*: planned/in construction

=== Aragon ===
The community of Aragon has only very recently started building its own highway network. The first span was opened to traffic just in 2008, and there are at least three more highways in study. Due to the limited financial capabilities of the Aragon regional government, many of them might be built as toll roads.

Sign	Type	Denomination	Itinerary
ARA-A1	Partial beltway	Quinto cinturón de Zaragoza	N-II/AP-2 — A-68
ARA-AP2	Interurban	Autopista ARA-AP2	Cariñena (A-23) — † — A-2 — † — ARA-AP4 — † — Mallén (AP-68/N-232)
ARA-A3 / A-127	Interurban	Autovía ARA-A3	Gallur (AP-68/N-232) — † — Ejea de los Caballeros
ARA-AP4	Interurban	Autopista ARA-AP4	Tarazona (A-11) — † — ARA-AP2
A-131 / A-230	Interurban	Still unnamed	Huesca — † — Huesca-Pirineos Airport — † — Sariñena — † — Bujaraloz (AP-2/N-II)
A-130	Interurban	Still unnamed	Barbastro (A-22) — † — Ontiñena — † — Caspe (AP-2/N-II)

*: in construction — †: planned

=== Asturias ===
The highway network in the mountainous Principality of Asturias is severely limited by the complexity of its relief, with a dense network of river valleys in between ranges such as the Picos de Europa.

Vertebral Asturian motorways have identifiers in the style of national ones, that is, white text on blue background, while roads in process of upgrading keep their old nomenclature until the full route is completed. Such is the case, for example, with the AS-III, which is an upgrade of the AS-17. The prefix is always AS, and Roman numerals are used.

Sign	Type	Denomination	Itinerary
AS-I	Interurban	Autovía minera	Mieres (A-66) — A-64 — Gijón (A-8)
AS-II	Interurban	Autovía industrial	Oviedo — AS-III — Gijón
AS-III / AS-17	Interurban	Autovía del Acero	Avilés (A-8) — * — Llanera — AS-II — A-66
AS-117	City access	Autovía AS-117	AS-I — Langreo

*: planned/in construction

=== Balearic Islands ===
All of the roads in the Balearic Islands were transferred to the regional government when the Autonomous Community was formed, and several are now under the competence of the several Island Councils (Consell Insular). The prefix denotes the island, and the second letter (if any) is lowercase. Autopista identifiers are white on blue background, while twinned roads closer to the autovía category keep their identifiers.

Sign	Type	Denomination	Itinerary
Ma-1	Interurban	Eje de Poniente	Palma port — Peguera
Ma-13	Interurban	Eje Central	Palma (Ma-20) — Sa Pobla
Ma-19	Interurban	Eje de Levante	Palma — Llucmajor
Ma-20	Beltway	Vía de Cintura	Ma-1 — Ma-13 — Ma-19

=== Basque Country ===
A special case together with Navarre, the Basque Country has received full powers over most roads in its territory, including the national roads that comprised the primary network, and nowadays only the AP-1 and the AP-68 are under the direct authority of the Spanish government as part of the Red de carreteras del Estado (National Road Network). Currently, roads are managed by the three Diputaciones Forales of the Basque provinces.

The fact that such transfer took place before the thorough renaming of national roads and highways in 2003 makes the naming of transferred "national" highways inconsistent with the national network: the A-1 is still called the N-I in the Basque Country, and the same identifier (A-8) applies to the tolled and toll-free parts of the Autopista del Cantábrico in Biscay. Furthermore, new highways built since then by the provinces have one of the following prefixes: A for Álava-Araba, BI for Biscay (Vizcaya-Bizkaia) or GI for Guipúzcoa-Gipuzkoa.

Sign	Type	Denomination	Itinerary
AP-1	Interurban	Autopista de Vitoria a Irún por Eibar	Vitoria airport (N-622/N-624) — N-240 — Arrasate-Mondragón (GI-632) — Vergara-Bergara (GI-632, GI-627) — Eibar (joins AP-8 up to Irún)
A-8 / AP-8	Interurban	Autopista del Cantábrico	Cantabria/Basque Country border — Bilbao (AP-68) — Eibar (AP-1) — San Sebastián-Donostia (GI-20 West) — Hernani (GI-131) — Rentería-Errenteria (GI-20 East) — Irún — Spain/France border (A63)
BI-30	Partial beltway	Variante Sur Metropolitana de Bilbao	A-8 — * — BI-636 — * — AP-68 — * — A-8
BI-631	Interurban	Autovía BI-631	Bilbao — Mungía
BI-636	Interurban	Corridor del Cadagua	Bilbao (A-8) — Gueñes
BI-637	Interurban	Autovía BI-637	Barakaldo (N-637) — Getxo
BI-644	Access road	Autovía BI-644	Santurtzi (A-8) — Bilbao port
GI-11	City access	Autovía GI-11	Lasarte-Oria (N-I) — GI-20
GI-20	Urban	Variante de Donostia-San Sebastián	AP-8 West — GI-11 — GI-21 — GI-636 — AP-8 East
GI-131	Interurban	Autovía del Urumea	Andoain (N-I) — * — Urnieta — AP-8 — San Sebastián-Donostia
GI-632	Interurban	Autovía GI-632	Vergara-Bergara (AP-1) — * — Zumarraga — Beasain (N-I)
N-102	City access	Western access to Vitoria/Gasteiz	N-I — Vitoria-Gasteiz
N-622	Interurban	Autovía de Altube	Vitoria-Gasteiz (N-I) — AP-1/N-624 — AP-68
N-624	Access road	Access to Vitoria Airport	AP-1/N-622 — Vitoria Airport
N-637	Urban	Asúa Valley corridor	Barakaldo (A-8) — BI-637 — BI-634 — Galdakao (A-8)

*: in construction — †: planned

=== Canary Islands ===
Following the example of the other insular community in Spain, all roads in the Canary Islands are under the authority of either the regional government or one of the several Island Councils (cabildo insular). The prefix denotes the island, and identifiers are usually white on blue background.

Sign	Type	Denomination	Itinerary
FV-1	Interurban	Autovía FV-1	Fuerteventura Airport — Corralejo
FV-2	Interurban	Autovía FV-2	Puerto del Rosario — Fuerteventura Airport, Barranco del Vachuelo — Marabu
GC-1	Interurban & urban	Autopista GC-1	Las Palmas de Gran Canaria — GC-2 — GC-3 — Telde — Gran Canaria Airport — Arinaga — Maspalomas — Puerto de Mogán
GC-2	Interurban	Autopista GC-2	Las Palmas de Gran Canaria (GC-1) — GC-20 — Bañaderos, Santa María de Guía — Gáldar
GC-3	Interurban	Autopista GC-3	GC-2 — Arucas (GC-20) — GC-23 — GC-31 — GC-4 — GC-1
GC-4	Interurban	Autovía GC-4	San Francisco de Paula (GC-3) — Monte Lentiscal
GC-23	Urban	Autovía GC-23	GC-2 — GC-3
GC-31	City access	Autovía GC-31	GC-3 — Las Palmas de Gran Canaria (GC-1)
LZ-3	Ring road	Circunvalación de Arrecife	LZ-18 — LZ-1 — LZ-20 — LZ-2
TF-1	Interurban	Autopista del Sur	Santa Cruz de Tenerife (TF-5) — TF-4 — TF-2 — Candelaria — Tenerife South Airport — Adeje
TF-2	Urban	Autovía TF-2	TF-5 — TF-1
TF-4	City access	Autovía TF-4	TF-1 — Santa Cruz de Tenerife
TF-5	Interurban	Autopista del Norte	Santa Cruz de Tenerife (TF-1) — TF-2 — San Cristóbal de la Laguna — Tenerife North Airport — Puerto de la Cruz
TF-11	Interurban	Autovía TF-11	Fishing docks — San Andrés

=== Castilla-La Mancha ===
Another community that has recently started building its own high capacity road network, Castilla-La Mancha has completed one autovía and has at least five more in varied states of advanced planning and building. In the flat La Mancha, relief does not usually require costly tunnels and bridges, though the region does contain several nature reserves including the Tablas de Daimiel National Park wetlands. Highway identifiers are white on blue background.

Sign	Type	Denomination	Itinerary
CM-40	Partial beltway	Ronda Suroeste de Toledo	A-40 (West) — TO-21 — CM-42
CM-41	Interurban	Autovía de La Sagra	Valmojado (A-5) — Illescas (A-42/AP-41) — * — Borox — * — Seseña (R-4/A-4) Borox — * — Añover de Tajo
CM-42	Interurban	Autovía de los Viñedos	Toledo (TO-20) — CM-40 — N-401 — Nambroca — Consuegra — Madridejos (A-4) — Alcázar de San Juan — Tomelloso (A-43)
CM-43	Interurban	Autovía de la Solana	Manzanares (A-4) — * — La Solana — † — Albacete (A-32)
CM-44	Interurban	Autovía del Júcar	Cuenca (A-40) — † — Motilla del Palancar (A-3) — † — Albacete (A-32)
CM-45	Interurban	Autovía IV Centenario	Ciudad Real (A-41) — * — Almagro — * — Valdepeñas (A-4) — † — Alcaraz (A-32)

*: in construction — †: planned

=== Castile and León ===
The largest community in Spain by land area, Castile and León has a dense road network, but until recently most of its highways had been part of the national system. The terrain is varied, from the plains of the Meseta to the rugosities of the Montes de León, and archeological remains abound. Regional highways are renamed to A-nnn, always with three digits to avoid clashes with the national network, but usually keeping the original number of the upgraded regional road CL-nnn. Identifiers are white on blue background.

Sign	Type	Denomination	Itinerary
A-125	Interurban	Autovía A-125	La Bañeza (A-6) — * — Puebla de Sanabria (A-52) — † — Spain/Portugal border (N103)
A-231	Interurban	Autovía del Camino de Santiago	Burgos (BU-30/A-62) — Osorno (A-67) — Sahagún — León (A-66)
A-510	Interurban	Autovía A-510	Salamanca (SA-20) — * — Alba de Tormes
A-601	Interurban	Autovía de Pinares	Valladolid (VA-30) — Cuéllar — Segovia (N-110)
A-610	Interurban	Autovía A-610	Palencia (A-67) — Magaz de Pisuerga (A-62) — † — Aranda de Duero (A-1)
A-631	Interurban	Autovía de La Espina	Ponferrada (A-6) — * — Toreno — † — Villablino — † — Los Barrios de Luna (AP-66)
A-629	Interurban	Autovía de Las Merindades	Burgos (A-73) - Viarcayo - Viasana de Mena - (Bi-636) - Balmaseda - Bilbao

*: in construction — †: planned

=== Cantabria ===
The only community without a high-capacity network of its own, Cantabria is severely held back in such a development by a highly mountainous terrain that multiplies the cost of building any kind of expressway. Thus, its population is served by the national highway network supplemented by regional conventional roads.

=== Catalonia ===
The second most populated community in Spain, Catalonia has a thorough regional road network, with several highways managed by the Generalitat de Catalunya. Also, the state-owned highways previously known as A-16 through A-19 were transferred to the Catalan government and renamed according to the new regional guidelines enacted in 2004. Highway identifiers are white on blue background.

Sign	Type	Denomination	Itinerary
C-14	Interurban	Autovía C-14	Reus (T-11) — Alcover
C-16	Interurban	Eix del Llobregat	Barcelona (Via Augusta/B-20) — Sant Cugat del Vallès (AP-7) — Rubí — Terrassa — Manresa (C-25) — Berga — Bellver de Cerdanya (N-1411) —†— Puigcerdà — † — France (N20)
C-17	Urban & interurban	Eix del Congost	Barcelona (Meridiana Avenue/B-20) — C-33/C-58 — Montcada — C-33/C-59 — Montmeló (C-33/AP-7 North) — Granollers — Vic (C-25) — Manlleu (C-37) — Torelló — * — Ripoll
C-25	Interurban	Eix Transversal	Cervera (A-2) — Manresa (C-16) — Vic (C-17) — Vic(C-25) — AP-7/Girona Airport — Riudellots de la Selva (A-2)
C-31	Interurban	Eix Costaner	Castelldefels (C-32) — Barcelona Airport — El Prat de Llobregat — L'Hospitalet de Llobregat (B-10) — Barcelona (Gran Vía de les Corts Catalanes) Barcelona (Gran Vía de les Corts Catalanes) — B-10 — Badalona — Montgat (C-32), Santa Cristina d'Aro (C-65) — Platja d'Aro — * — Palamós — Palafrugell
C-31B	Interurban	Autovía C-31B	Tarragona — Salou
C-31C	City access	Autovía C-31C	Sant Boi de Llobregat — El Prat de Llobregat (C-31)
C-31D	City access	Autopista C-31D	C-32 — Mataró (Porta Laietana)
C-32	Interurban	Corridor del Mediterrani	Autopista Pau Casals: El Vendrell (AP-7) — Calafell — Cunit — Vilanova i la Geltrú — Sitges — Castelldefels (C-31) — B-22 — L'Hospitalet de Llobregat (B-10/B-20) Autopista del Maresme: Montgat (C-31) — Mataró (C-31D/C-60) — Arenys de Mar — Sant Pol de Mar — Palafolls — Tordera (N-II) — † — Lloret de Mar — † — Tossa de Mar
C-33	Interurban	Access to Barcelona from AP-7	Barcelona (C-17/C-58) — Mollet del Vallés (C-17/C-59) — Montmeló (AP-7)
C-35	Interurban	Autovía C-35	Vidreres (AP-7/A-2) — Llagostera (C-65)
C-58	Interurban	Autopista del Vallès	Barcelona (B-10/B-20) — C-33 — Cerdanyola del Vallès — AP-7 — Sabadell Airport — Sabadell/Sant Quirze del Vallès — Terrassa (Vallès Avenue) — C-16
C-60	Interurban	Autovía C-60	Mataró (C-32) — La Roca del Vallès (AP-7)
C-65	Interurban	Autovia C-65	Santa Cristina d'Aro (C-31) — Llagostera (C-35) — † — Girona (A-2)
C-66	Interurban	Autovía C-66	Sarrià de Ter (AP-7) — Banyoles (C-31) — † — Besalú (A-26)
C-68	Interurban	Autovía C-68	Figueres (AP-7) — * — Roses

*: in construction — †: planned

=== Extremadura ===
A sparsely populated community, Extremadura has a terrain that can be considered favourable for a regional highway plan, as the interior is mostly flat. However, the fact that its northern and north-eastern borders are blocked by mountain ranges with typical elevations of 1,100 metres (3,600 ft) over the main mesa, combined with the mentioned demographics of the territory (Extremadura ranks the 5th community in Spain by land area, but only the 12th by population, and none of its cities reach 200,000 inhabitants) has traditionally limited the penetration of even the national highway network.

Nevertheless, the community is in an excellent position for connections between Spain and Portugal (the national highway A-5 reaches Portugal through Badajoz in Extremadura), and in the last decade, the regional government has revealed an ambitious plan that would create four to six regional highways. In addition to the vertebration of the Extremaduran territory, some of these roads are explicitly meant to provide alternative routes to the two national highways in the region (A-5 and A-66), establishing connections between them and an additional route to Portugal to the north of the current one.

It is the policy of the regional government to avoid twinning existing roads (and thus replacing them with the upgraded autovía), so instead all autovías are built from scratch even if they are parallel to the old road. All Extremaduran highways are currently named EX-An, with white identifiers on blue background. Some of them have branches named EX-An-Rm, which also have white-on-blue identifiers, but such branches need not be highways themselves even if they are built concurrently with the main road.

Sign	Type	Denomination	Itinerary
EX-A1	Interurban	Autovía EX-A1	Navalmoral de la Mata (A-5) — Malpartida de Plasencia — Plasencia (A-66) — * — Coria — * — Moraleja — † — Spain/Portugal border (N103)
EX-A2	Interurban	Autovía EX-A2	Miajadas (A-5) — Don Benito (EX-A2-R1) — Villanueva de la Serena (EX-A2-R2)
EX-A3	Interurban	Autovía EX-A3	Zafra (A-66) — * — Jerez de los Caballeros
EX-A4	Interurban	Autovía EX-A4	Cáceres (A-66) — † — Badajoz (A-5)

*: in construction — †: planned

=== Galicia ===
Often compared to Scotland because of its orographic similarities, Galicia is a hilly but not mountainous region with an approximate population of 3M people. Its highway network mainly functions as the terminal part of trips, since the vertebral function is mainly coped by the national system. Identifiers start with AG (for Autovía/Autoestrada galega) and are white on blue background.

Sign	Type	Denomination	Itinerary
AG-11	Interurban	Autovía del Barbanza	Rianxo (AP-9) — Boiro — Ribeira
AG-41	Interurban	Autovía del Salnés	Meis (AP-9) — Sanxenxo — * — O Grove
AG-46	Interurban	Autovía do Morrazo	Vilaboa (AP-9) — Moaña — Cangas do Morrazo (CG-4.1) — * — Aldán (PO-315)
AG-51	Access road	Access to PLISAN	A-52 — † — Salvaterra-As Neves Industrial and Logistic Platform (PLISAN, Plataforma Logístico-Industrial Salvaterra-As Neves)
AG-52	Interurban	Autovía AG-52	Tui (A-55) — † — Tomiño
AG-53	Interurban	Autoestrada Central Galega	Dozón (AP-53) — Cea — Maside (AG-54) — A-52
AG-54	Access road	Access to O Carballiño	Maside (AG-53) — O Carballiño
AG-55	Interurban	Autoestrada da Costa da Morte	A Coruña — Arteixo (A-6) — Laracha — Carballo — † — Fisterra
AG-56	Interurban	Autovía AG-56	Santiago de Compostela (AP-9) — Brión — Gundín — * — Noia
AG-57	Interurban	Autoestrada do Val Miñor	Vigo (VG-20) — AG-57N — Ramallosa — * — Baiona
AG-57N	Access road	Autopista AG-57N	AG-57 — Nigrán
AG-58	Access road	Autovía AG-58	AG-59 — Cacheiras
AG-59	Access road	Autovía AG-59	Santiago de Compostela (AP-53) — AG-58 — Raris — * — Pontevea — * — A Estrada
AG-64	Interurban	Autovía Ferrol - Vilalba	Ferrol — Rio do Pozo industrial development — Narón — As Pontes de García Rodríguez — Vilalba (A-8)

*: in construction — †: planned

=== La Rioja ===
The small and mountainous region of La Rioja has just started planning regional highways of its own. After an initial plan to upgrade the LR-134 road (Calahorra—Arnedo) was downgraded to a simple twinning with roundabout intersections, a study is now being drawn to build at least a true highway connecting the national highways AP-68 and A-12, with a possible projection into the south of the community. Another highway would provide access from the regional capital beltway to the tolled AP-68.

Sign	Type	Denomination	Itinerary
LR-111	Interurban	Autovía LR-111	Haro (AP-68) — † — Santo Domingo de la Calzada (A-12) — † — Ezcaray
LR-250	Access road	Autovía LR-250	Logroño (LO-20+A-12) — † — Villamediana de Iregua (AP-68)

*: in construction — †: planned

=== Madrid ===
The region containing the capital city of Spain, Madrid ranks the 3rd community by population, and is by far the most densely populated. Even though it contains the centre of the national radial highway system, the Madrid regional government (traditionally more committed to the expansion of the Metro system) has dedicated vast resources during the last decade to upgrade the regional road network and, where necessary, create new high-capacity roads that both complement the national system and vertebrate zones of the community not covered by the national network.

Madrid regional highways have codes that are no different from other regional roads, with orange, green and yellow backgrounds, even for newly built highways like the M-45. Usually, the upgrade of long roads, twinned or not, to the motorway level is not undertaken at once, so the list below only contains the itinerary for the spans that actually run as highways or have been planned to. For example, the M-506 is "broken" at its connection with the M-419 and the A-42 by a succession of roundabouts until the link with the R-4, so in the list it is separated in two highway stretches.

Sign	Type	Denomination	Itinerary
M-45	Partial beltway	Autopista M-45	Madrid/Leganés (M-40) — R-5 — A-42/M-402 — A-4 — M-301 — M-31 — A-3 — R-3 — Coslada — San Fernando de Henares (M-206) — M-50
M-100	Interurban	Autovía M-100	San Sebastián de los Reyes (A-1) — † — M-106/M-111 — † — Cobeña — † — Daganzo de Arriba — * — R-2 — A-2/M-203
M-203	Interurban	Autopista eje Este	Mejorada del Campo (R-3) — * — Soto de Aldovea — M-224 — A-2/M-100
M-206	Interurban	Autovía M-206	Torrejón de Ardoz — * — Loeches
M-402	Urban	Autovía M-402	Madrid (Villaverde, A-42) — * — Leganés (ParqueSur mall) — † — Leganés (M-406)
M-404	Interurban	Autovía M-404	Navalcarnero (A-5/M-600) — * — R-5 — * — El Álamo — * — Serranillos del Valle (AP-41) — * — Griñón (M-407) — * — Torrejón de la Calzada (A-42) — * — R-4 — * — Valdemoro (A-4) — * — Ciempozuelos
M-406	Interurban & beltway	Autovía M-406	Leganés (*M-402) — M-409 — M-407 — Alcorcón (A-5/M-40)
M-407	Interurban	Autovía M-407	Leganés (M-406) — * — M-50 — * — Fuenlabrada (M-506) — M-410 — Griñón (M-404)
M-409	Interurban	Autovía M-409	Leganés (M-406) — M-50 — Fuenlabrada
M-423	Interurban	Autovía M-423	Pinto (M-506) — Valdemoro (M-404/R-4)
M-500	Interurban	Carretera de Castilla	Madrid (M-30) — M-503 — A-6
M-501	Interurban	Autovía de los Pantanos	M-40/M-511 — Boadilla del Monte (M-50) — Villaviciosa de Odón (M-506) — Brunete (M-600) — Chapinería (M-510) — Navas del Rey
M-503	Interurban	Autovía eje Noroeste	M-500 — * — Pozuelo de Alarcón — M-40 — M-50 — Villanueva del Pardillo — Villanueva de la Cañada (M-600)
M-506	Interurban & urban	Autovía M-506	Western stretch: Villaviciosa de Odón (M-501) — † — Alcorcón (M-50/A-5) — Móstoles (M-50) — M-407 — Fuenlabrada (M-405/M-413) — M-419 Eastern stretch: R-4 — Pinto (A-4) — M-423 — Warner Madrid Theme Park — † — San Martín de la Vega — † — Arganda del Rey (A-3/M-300)
M-509	Interurban	Autovía M-509	M-50 — * — Villanueva del Pardillo
M-600	Interurban	Autovía M-600	Villanueva de la Cañada (M-503) — † — Brunete (M-501) — † — Sevilla la Nueva — † — Navalcarnero (A-5/M-404)
M-607	Interurban	Autovía de Colmenar	Madrid (M-30) — M-40 — Alcobendas (M-616) — Tres Cantos — Colmenar Viejo (M-609)
M-609	Interurban	Autovía M-609	Colmenar Viejo (M-607) — * — Soto del Real

*: in construction — †: planned

=== Murcia ===
The coastal region of Murcia is an important touristic destination in Spain. Its nearly 1.5 million inhabitants are mainly concentrated in the eastern part of the community, from Murcia city to the coast, while inland zones of Yecla, Jumilla and Caravaca de la Cruz are more sparsely populated. The national highway network provides good connectivity along the coast, with three highways links with Andalusia (A-91, A-7 and the tolled AP-7) and another three with the Valencian Community (A-7 and the tolled AP-7 and AP-37), but only the A-30 motorway connects Murcia with inland Spain. It is thus the goal of the regional government to provide alternative highway corridors that connect the inland border of Murcia to the coastal zones.

All in all, the autonomous government is investing heavily in its highway network, both for trips along the coast and inland-coast connectivity. Due to the expansion of the regional network that this effort is expected to produce, Murcia has recently implemented a new naming scheme for its regional highways, more in accordance with the national network. When the renaming is complete, all highways will be identified by white-on-blue names that start with RM (for Región de Murcia).

Sign	Type	Denomination	Itinerary
RM-1	Interurban	Autovía RM-1	San Javier (AP-7) — Zeneta (MU-30/RM-30/†AP-37)
RM-2	Interurban	Autovía Alhama - Campo de Cartagena	Alhama (A-7) — RM-23 — Fuente Álamo (MU-602) — Cartagena (A-30)
RM-3	Interurban	Autovía RM-3	Totana (A-7) — RM-23 — Mazarrón (AP-7)
RM-11	Interurban	Autovía RM-11	Lorca (A-7) — N-332 — Águilas (AP-7)
RM-12	Access road	Autovía de La Manga	Cartagena (AP-7/CT-32) — El Algar (N-332) — La Manga del Mar Menor
RM-15	Interurban	Autovía del Noroeste	Alcantarilla (MU-30/A-7) — Mula — Caravaca de la Cruz (C-415/RM-714)
RM-16	Access road	Autovía RM-16	A-30 — RM-17 — Región de Murcia International Airport
RM-17	Access road	Autovía RM-17	A-30 — RM-17
RM-19	Access road	Autovía del Mar Menor	A-30 — Polaris World — San Javier (AP-7)
RM-23	Interurban	Autovía de conexión RM-23	RM-2 — RM-3

*: in construction — †: planned

=== Navarre ===
The Foral Community of Navarre is another community with full powers over most roads in its territory. However, in contrast to the neighbouring Basque Country, the regional government has decided to keep the identifiers of some highways — namely, those which were part of a national highway before being transferred — in sync with the national system. The only road in Navarrese territory not under the authority of the regional government is the national toll highway AP-68 (Autopista Vasco-Aragonesa), which was kept by the state to avoid a four-pronged management by the concessionaire and the Basque, Navarrese and Spanish governments.

Sign	Type	Denomination	Itinerary
A-1	Interurban	Autovía del Norte	Álava/Navarre border — Ziordia — Altsasu (A-10) — Navarre/Guipúzcoa limit
A-10	Interurban	Autovía de la Barranca	Irurtzun (A-15/AP-15) — Irañeta — Lakuntza — Arbizu — Etxarri-Aranatz — Altsasu (A-1)
A-12	Interurban	Autovía del Camino de Santiago	Zizur Mayor (A-15) — Puente la Reina — Estella-Lizarra — Los Arcos — Lazagurría — Viana — * — Navarre/La Rioja border (LO-20/A-12)
A-15	Interurban	Autovía A-15	Ronda de Pamplona Oeste (beltway): Noain (AP-15/A-21) — PA-30 — Pamplona-Iruña (PA-31) — Zizur Mayor (A-12) — Orkoyen — Berriozar (PA-34) — AP-15 Autovía de Leitzaran: Irurtzun (A-10/AP-15) — Lekunberri — Azpirotz — Areso — Navarre/Guipúzcoa border
AP-15	Interurban	Autopista AP-15	Southern stretch: AP-68 — A-68 — Castejón (N-113) — Tafalla (NA-132) — Pueyo — Baranoain/Garinoain — NA-601/N-121 — Noain (A-15/A-21) Northern stretch: A-15 — PA-34 — Sarasate (N-240a) — Irurtzun (A-10/A-15)
A-21	Interurban	Autovía del Pirineo	Noain (A-15/AP-15) — Monreal — Ibargoiti — * — Liédena — * — Yesa — * — Navarre/Huesca border
AP-68	Interurban	Autopista del Ebro	Zaragoza/Navarre border (N-232) — Cortes — Fontellas (NA-134) — Tudela (AP-68) — Liédena — AP-15/N-232
PA-30	Partial beltway	Ronda de Pamplona	A-15 — Pamplona (PA-31) — Aranguren — PA-33 — Olaz — NA-150
PA-34	Access road	Western access to Pamplona	AP-15 — Berriozar (A-15) — Pamplona-Iruña (N-240)

*: in construction — †: planned

=== Valencian Community ===
The regional motorways do not have identifiers different from other roads, so orange, green and yellow backgrounds are possible. All identifiers are prefixed with CV for Comunitat Valenciana, the official name of the region. The regional highway CV-10 is currently being expanded to the boundary with Catalonia and will be transferred to the national Government as a new stretch of the A-7 (Autovía del Mediterráneo). The same applies to the CV-40 highway.

Sign	Type	Denomination	Itinerary
CV-10	Interurban	Autovía de la Plana	Nules (A-7/N-340) — Betxí — CV-20 — Castellón de la Plana (CV-17) — CV-16 — Borriol — La Pobla Tornesa — Cabanes — * — Vilanova d'Alcolea — † — La Jana — † — Castellón/Tarragona border
CV-18	Interurban	Autovía CV-18	Castellón de la Plana (CV-197) — † — Almassora — * — Burriana — † — Nules (N-340)
CV-30	Partial beltway	Ronda Nord de València	V-30 — Paterna (CV-31) — Valencia (CV-35) — † — Alboraia — † — V-21
CV-31	Urban	Distribuïdor Nord	Paterna (CV-30) — CV-365 — Burjassot (CV-35)
CV-32	Interurban	Eix de la Gombalda	Massalfassar (V-21) — * — Massamagrell/Museros (CV-300) — † — A-7
CV-33	Interurban	Distribuïdor Sud	Torrent (CV-366) — Albal
CV-35	Urban & interurban	Autovía de Ademuz	Valencia (CV-30) — Burjassot (CV-61/CV-365) — A-7 — San Antonio de Benagéber — La Pobla de Vallbona — CV-50 — Llíria
CV-36	Iinterurban	Autovía de Torrent	Valencia (Camí Nou de Picanya) — Picanya (CV-366) — Torrent — Alaquàs — El Mas del Jutge — A-7
CV-40	Interurban	Autovía CV-40	Xàtiva (A-7) — Ontinyent — Albaida — * — Cocentaina — * — Alcoi — * — A-7
CV-60	Interurban	Autovía CV-60	L'Olleria (CV-40) — † — Alfarrasí (N-340) — † — CV-610 — Gandia (CV-600)
CV-70	Interurban	Autovía CV-70	Alcoi (A-7) — † — Polop (N-340) — † — Benidorm (AP-7)
CV-80	Interurban	Autovía CV-80	Sax (A-31) — Castalla — A-7
CV-365	Urban	Northeastern access to Paterna	Burjassot (CV-35) — CV-31 — V-11/V-30
CV-500	Urban	Autovía del Saler	Valencia (Alcalde Reig Street) — V-30 — El Saler
CV-864	Partial beltway	Ronda Sud de Elx	EL-20 — † — CV-866

*: in construction — †: planned

== See also ==
- Transport in Spain
- List of controlled-access highway systems
- Evolution of motorway construction in European nations
