= A381 =

A381 may refer to:

- The A381 road in Devon, England
- The Autovía A-381, a motorway in Andalucia, Spain
- The RMAS Cricklade (A381), a fleet tender to the UK's Royal Navy
