= Estadi Mallorca Son Moix =

Football stadium in Palma de Mallorca, Spain

- Estadio Mallorca Son Moix
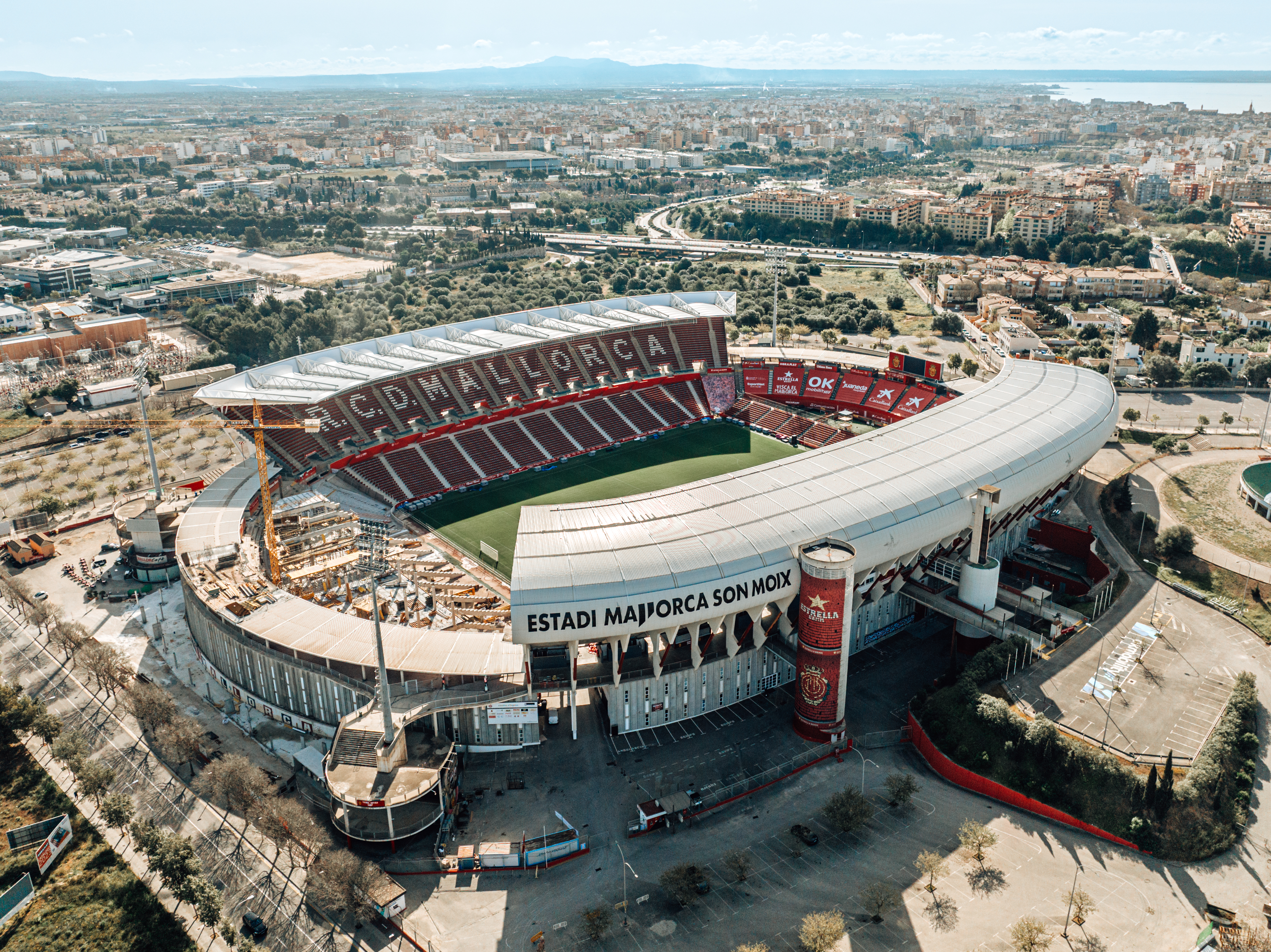
- The UEFA Estadi Mallorca Son Moix under renovation in 2023
- Interactive map of Estadi Mallorca Son Moix
- Full name: Mallorca Son Moix Stadium
- Former names: Estadi de Son Moix (1999–2006, 2017–2020); Ono Estadi (2006–2010); Iberostar Estadi (2010–2017); Visit Mallorca Estadi (2020–2022)
- Location: Palma de Mallorca, Spain
- Coordinates: 39°35′24″N 2°37′48″E
- Owner: Ajuntament de Palma
- Operator: Real Mallorca
- Capacity: 25,736
- Surface: Grass
- Record attendance: 23,318 (16 August 2025); Real Mallorca 0–3 FC Barcelona
- Field size: 105 m × 68 m (344 ft × 223 ft)

Construction
- Opened: June 1999
- Renovated: 2023–2024

Tenants
- Real Mallorca (1999–present); Spain national football team (selected matches)

Estadi Mallorca Son Moix is a football stadium located in Palma de Mallorca, Balearic Islands, Spain, and serves as the home ground of Real Club Deportivo Mallorca. It is the largest stadium in the Balearic Islands and the 23th largest in Spain. Since the 2020 COVID-19 pandemic it was known as "Visit Mallorca Stadium" having been renamed in a partnership with Consell de Mallorca to help resume the tourist activities on the island.

The stadium is located in the Can Valero industrial zone in north-west Palma, 3 km from the city center and 13 km from the airport. It can be seen from the Vía de Cintura, Palma's urban motorway. Previously known as the Son Moix Stadium (Catalan: Estadi de Son Moix, Spanish: Estadio de Son Moix), the Iberostar Stadium (Catalan: Iberostar Estadi) and the Ono Estadi, the stadium was built for the 1999 Summer Universiade. In 1999, Real Mallorca obtained an agreement with the city council to use it for the next 50 years, replacing their previous stadium, Estadio Lluís Sitjar.

The stadium has a capacity of 25,736 people, making it the largest in the Balearic Islands. It has a bowl shape design with two of the stands having two tiers. The stadium was designed to allow for further development of both ends, eventually creating a fully two-tiered stadium with a capacity of over 40,000. A small temporary stand is sometimes erected on the athletics track; this can be removed for athletics events.

== International games ==
The Spain national football team has played four international matches at the stadium; the most recent one was on 5 June 2026 against England women in a World Cup qualifier match, with Spain winning 4-0.

== History ==
The stadium was constructed in 1999, and Mallorca's first match in the stadium was on the opening day of the 1999–2000 La Liga season, on 20 August 1999 against Real Madrid.

In 2018, it was reported that Mallorca's American owners were looking to move out of the stadium, in part due to the club and their landlords being in disagreement over improvements to the existing stadium. However, talks advanced, and in May 2022 a €20 million renovation began. This renovation consisted of the removal of the athletics track, the addition of more seating tiers and an underground car park.

The works were completed in 2024. The renovation brought innovative tech such as Near-field communication technology, allowing fans to enter the stadium with electronic tickets instead of traditional paper tickets.

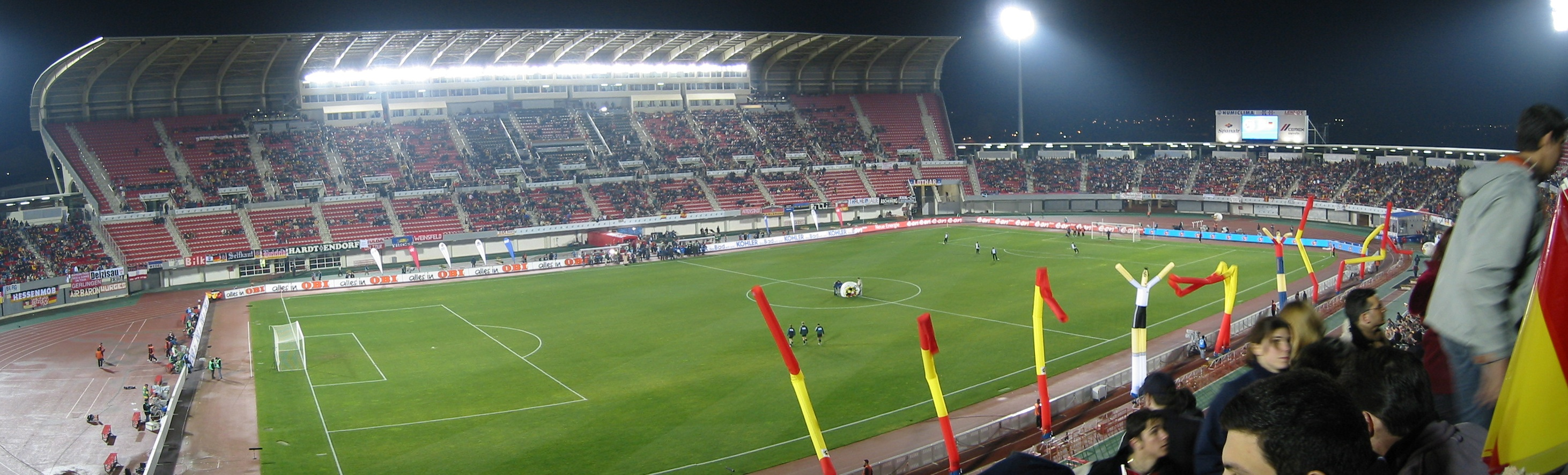
Panoramic of the Visit Mallorca Stadium

Preceded by Stadio Angelo Massimino; Italy	Universiade; 1999	Succeeded by Workers' Stadium; China
