= Autovía A-382 =

Autovía in Andalusia, Spain

Autovía A-382

Major junctions
- From: Arcos de la Frontera
- To: Jerez de la Frontera

Location
- Country: Spain
- Provinces: Province of Cádiz

Highway system
- Highways in Spain; Autopistas and autovías; National Roads

The Autovía A-382 is a local autovía in Andalusia, Spain. It is 27 km (16.8 miles) long and runs from the Autopista AP-4 at Jerez de la Frontera to Arcos de la Frontera. It was originally part of the N-342 road.
