= CA-36 =

CA-36 or CA36 may refer to:

- California's 36th congressional district
- California State Route 36
- Autovía CA-36, a highway in Spain
- USS Minneapolis (CA-36), a World War II heavy cruiser
- Calcium-36 (Ca-36 or ^{36}Ca), an isotope of calcium
- Caproni Ca.36, an Italian aircraft
- Maisaka Station, a railway station in Chūō-ku, Hamamatsu, Japan (station code: CA36)
