= Autovía LE-30 =

Motorway in Spain

Autovía LE-30
- Ronda Sur de León
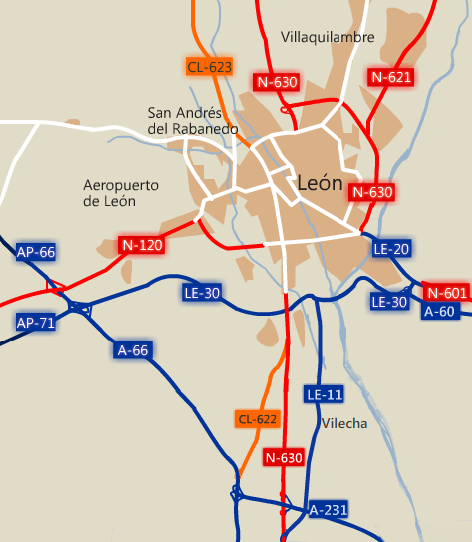

Route information
- Maintained by the Ministry of Development
- Length: 10 km (6.2 mi)

Major junctions
- East end: N-601

- West end: A-66 / AP-71

Location
- Country: Spain

Highway system
- Highways in Spain; Autopistas and autovías; National Roads
← LE-20	→ LL-11

Autovía LE-30 is an autovía in the city of León, Castile and León, Spain. Designed as a beltway or orbital road, it is the outer ring and runs around the south edge of the city. Starting in the east at the A-60/N-601/LE20 junction, it runs west for a distance of 10 kilometres (6 miles) and becomes the Autopista AP-71 at the Autovía A-66/Autopista AP-66 interchange. The highway was constructed in two sections: from N-601 to N-630 (exit 4, Avenida de Antibióticos); and then the remainder to the Virgen del Camino interchange (exits 9A/B).
