= PO-552 Road (Spain) =

PO-552

Location
- Country: Spain
- Autonomous community: Galicia
- Province: Pontevedra

Highway system
- Highways in Spain; Autopistas and autovías; National Roads

The PO-552 is a road from the Galician Regional Roads Network. It constitutes one of the major transport systems for the coastal towns of the southern area of the Province of Pontevedra, in Galicia, Spain. It links the city of Vigo with Tui and the Portuguese border, parallel to the Ria of Vigo, the Atlantic Ocean and the lower course of the Miño River.
