= Autovía A-58 =

Motorway in Spain

Autovía A-58
- Autovía Trujillo - Cáceres
- A-58 in red

Route information
- Length: 45.5 km (28.3 mi)

Major junctions
- From: Trujillo
- To: Cáceres

Location
- Country: Spain

Highway system
- Highways in Spain; Autopistas and autovías; National Roads

The Autovía A-58 (also known as Autovía Trujillo - Cáceres) is an autovía in the community of Extremadura, Spain. It starts at the Autovía A-5 just north of Trujillo and ends on the eastern outskirts of Cáceres, close to the Autovía A-66, while running parallel to the N-521 road. It was built between 2007 and 2009.
