= A383 =

A383 may refer to:

- Autovía A-383, a highway in Andalusia, Spain
- A383 road (England), a road in Devon
