= Autovía A-25 =

Proposed motorway from Alcolea del Pinar to Monreal del Campo (Spain)

Autovía A-25

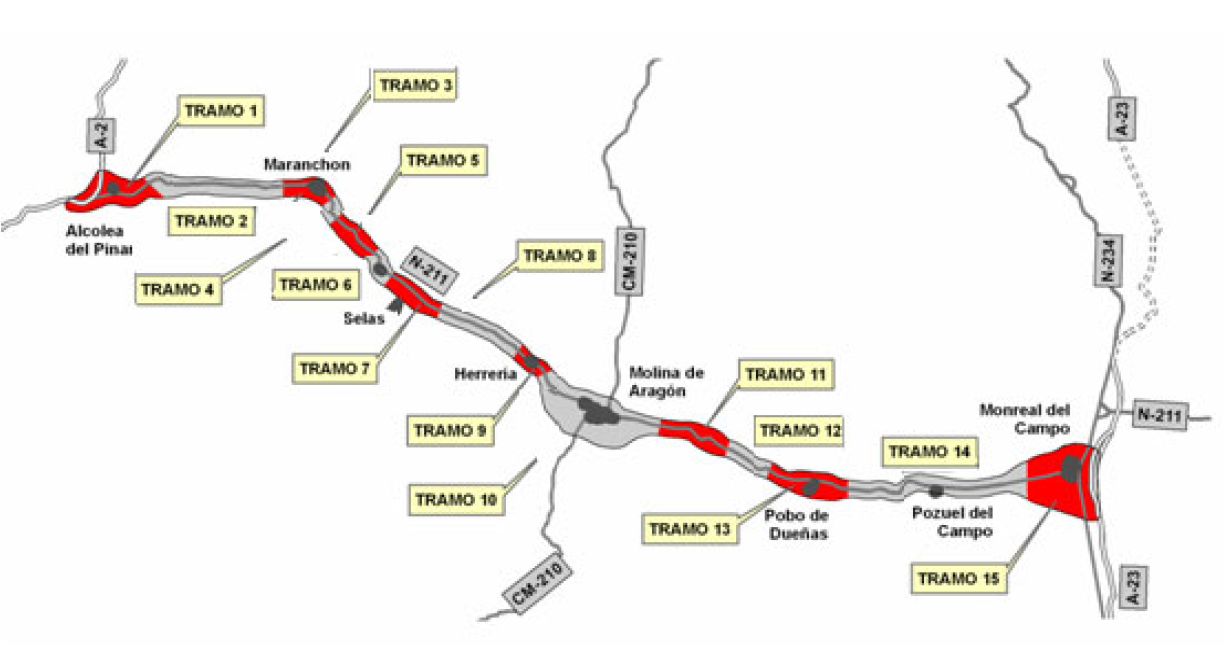

Route information
- Length: 110 km (68 mi)

Major junctions
- From: Alcolea del Pinar
- To: Monreal del Campo

Location
- Country: Spain

Highway system
- Highways in Spain; Autopistas and autovías; National Roads

The Autovía A-25 is a planned Spanish motorway that will connect the A2 with the A-23 between Alcolea del Pinar (Guadalajara) and Monreal del Campo (Teruel). A study was commissioned in 2009. The highway is not yet listed in the road construction budget. In the longer term it could replace the N-211 and the A-25 could continue to Alcañiz or even to Tarragona, connected with future highways A-68 and A-7.
