= Autovía A-80 =

Motorway in Spain

Autovía A-80
- Autovía del Suroccidente

Route information
- Length: 32 km (20 mi)

Major junctions
- From: La Espina (A-63)
- To: Cangas del Narcea

Location
- Country: Spain

Highway system
- Highways in Spain; Autopistas and autovías; National Roads

The Autovía A-80, also known as Autovía del Suroccidente (Southwestern highway), is a proposed highway in Asturias, Spain.

A-80 was initially proposed by Francisco Álvarez-Cascos, Minister of Public Works and Transport during the government of José María Aznar, as a connection of the coastal resort of Ribadesella and the Autovía A-8 with Cangas de Onís, but was discarded when José Luis Rodríguez Zapatero became prime minister.

Zapatero changed totally the project to a highway that will connect the A-63 at La Espina with Cangas del Narcea.

== Sections ==
Section	Status (2015)	Length (km)
La Espina (A-63) - Tineo	Under study	11.4
Tineo - Cangas del Narcea	Under study	20.7
