= Autovía A-33 =

Motorway from Cieza to Font de la Figuera (Spain)

Autovía A-33
- Autovía Cieza-Font de la Figuera
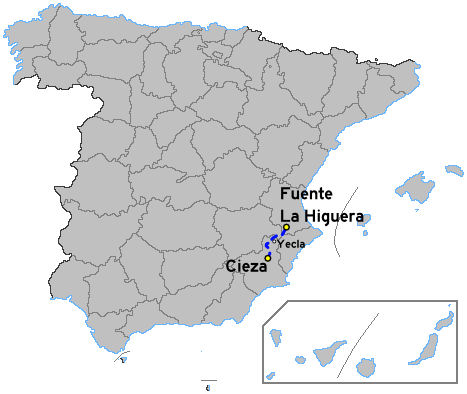

Route information
- Length: 64.4 km (40.0 mi)

Major junctions
- From: Cieza
- To: Font de la Figuera

Location
- Country: Spain

Highway system
- Highways in Spain; Autopistas and autovías; National Roads

The Autovía A-33 is a highway in Murcia, Spain between Cieza and Font de la Figuera. It follows or is an upgrade of the N-344 and will link the Autovía A-30 east of Cieza with the Autovía A-31/Autovía A-35 at Font de la Figuera north east of Murcia. It passes via Jumilla and Yecla over the Sierra del Buey close to the Puerto de Jumilla (810m).
