= Autopista AP-41 =

Autopista AP-41
- Autovía Linares-Albacete
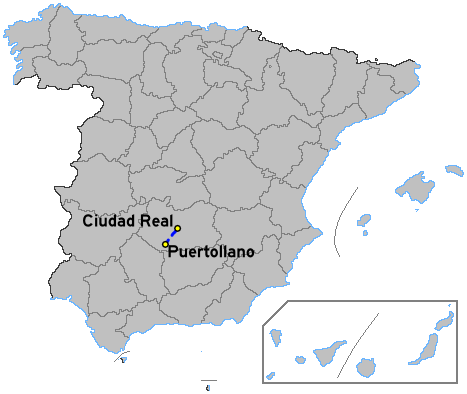

Route information
- Length: 36.9 km (22.9 mi)

Major junctions
- From: Miguelturra/Madrid
- To: Puertollano/Córdoba

Location
- Country: Spain

Highway system
- Highways in Spain; Autopistas and autovías; National Roads

The Autopista AP-41 is a proposed highway in central Spain. The first section from Madrid to Toledo has been completed. The road is due to follow the N-401 and N-420. It passes via the Ciudad Real. The road duplicates the Autovía A-4.
