= Autovía V-31 =

Motorway in Spain

Coordinates: 39.3958°N 0.3900°W

Autovía V-31

Route information
- Length: 13 km (8.1 mi)

Major junctions
- From: Silla
- To: Valencia

Location
- Country: Spain

Highway system
- Highways in Spain; Autopistas and autovías; National Roads

The Autovía V-31, commonly called Pista de Silla (Valencian: Silla road), is an autovía in Valencia, Spain. It is 13 km (8 miles) long and runs from the junction of the Autopista AP-7 and the Autovía A-7 near the small town of Silla to the Autovía V-30 on the southern outskirts of the city centre. Built as an upgrade of the N-332 road, which used to run through small towns in the Southern metropolitan area, it is frequently used by commuters and drivers travelling between Valencia and Alicante or Albacete.

The floods of the DANA of 2024 significantly affected the highway. During the afternoon of Tuesday, October 29, the force of the water caused damage to the infrastructure and swept away the vehicles that were traveling on the road out of control, interrupting traffic and trapping many drivers in their vehicles. The V-31 highway stopped the advance of the tongue of destruction during the DANA. The area closest to the Albufera suffered less damage, but the flooding on the western shoulder worsened. The half-meter height of the median turned the lane into a small reservoir and more aggressively flooded the commercial area that extends for kilometers parallel to the road, where the MN4 shopping center is located.
