= Autovía CO-32 =

Motorway in Spain

Autovía CO-32
- Circunvalación Oeste de Córdoba

Route information
- Length: 6.55 km (4.07 mi)

Major junctions
- From: A-4
- To: N-437

Location
- Country: Spain

Highway system
- Highways in Spain; Autopistas and autovías; National Roads

The Autovía CO-32 is the western bypass of Córdoba City. It connects the A-4 and A-45 with the N-437. It has a length of 6.55 kilometres (4.07 mi), and it is managed by the Government of Spain.
