= Autovía A-75 =

Road in Spain

Autovía A-75
- Autovía Verín - Frontera Portuguesa

Route information
- Length: 12.7 km (7.9 mi)

Major junctions
- From: Verín
- To: Portuguese border at Feces de Abaixo

Location
- Country: Spain

Highway system
- Highways in Spain; Autopistas and autovías; National Roads

The Autovía A-75 (also known as Autovía Verín - Frontera Portuguesa) is an autovía in Galicia, Spain. It is 12.7 km (7.9 miles) long and runs, parallel to the N-532 road, from the Autovía A-52 near the small city of Verín to the Portuguese border at the village of Feces de Abaixo, where it connects with the A24 autoestrada to Chaves. It was opened in a joint ceremony on 19 June 2010 by the Spanish and Portuguese Ministers for Public Works.
