= Autovía RM-3 =

Motorway in Spain

Autovía RM-3
- Autovía Totana-Mazarrón

Route information
- Maintained by Government of the Region of Murcia
- Length: 26 km (16 mi)

Major junctions
- From: A-7 E-15 Totana
- RM-23 AP-7
- To: RM-332 Mazarrón

Location
- Country: Spain

Highway system
- Highways in Spain; Autopistas and autovías; National Roads

The RM-3 is a freeway in Murcia, Spain. It connects the Guadalentín Valley with Mazarrón. It was inaugurated in 2007, and belongs to the Murcian Government.
