= R-1 motorway (Spain) =

Future radial motorway in Spain connecting Madrid and El Molar

The R-1 motorway (Spanish : Autopista Radial R-1) is a future Spanish radial motorway serving Madrid (M-12) — † — M-51 — † — (A-1)-El Molar.
