= Autopista AP-71 =

Autopista AP-71
- Autopista León - Astorga

Route information
- Length: 37.5 km (23.3 mi)

Major junctions
- From: León
- To: Astorga

Location
- Country: Spain

Highway system
- Highways in Spain; Autopistas and autovías; National Roads

The Autopista AP-71 (also known as Autopista León - Astorga) is an autopista in the province of León, in the community of Castile and León, Spain. It is 37.5 km (23.3 miles) long and runs, parallel to the N-120 road, from the junction of the Autovía A-66/Autopista AP-66 and the Autovía LE-30 near the city of León to the Autovía A-6 at the town of Astorga. It opened in October 2002 as the A-12, being redesignated the AP-71 the following year.
