= Autovía B-24 =

Motorway in Spain

Autovía B-24

Major junctions
- From: Barcelona
- To: Autopista AP-7

Location
- Country: Spain
- Autonomous community: Catalonia
- Province: Barcelona

Highway system
- Highways in Spain; Autopistas and autovías; National Roads; Primary Highways in Catalonia

The Autovia B-24 is a highway in Spain. The road connects Barcelona to the towns of Penedès.

It starts at a junction with the Autovía A-2 south of the City centre. The road is under construction and will form an upgrade of the start of the N-340. Completion is planned by 2017.
