= Autovía A-76 =

Motorway in Spain

Autovía A-76

Major junctions
- From: Ponferrada
- To: Ourense

Location
- Country: Spain

Highway system
- Highways in Spain; Autopistas and autovías; National Roads

The Autovía A-76 is a proposed initial upgrade of the N-120, a highway in northern Spain. There are another alternatives for this project to communicate these two northern cities, Ponferrada and Ourense. Nowadays this highway is a project of Spanish Transportation Ministry (Ministerio de Fomento del Gobierno de España), and this will be able to be constructed in 2010; according to Strategic Transportation Civil Actuations Dossier of 2005.
