= Autovía A-12 =

Motorway from Pamplona to Burgos (Spain)

Autovía A-12
- Autovía Camino de Santiago

Route information
- Length: 190 km (120 mi)

Major junctions
- From: Pamplona
- To: Burgos

Location
- Country: Spain

Highway system
- Highways in Spain; Autopistas and autovías; National Roads

The Autovía A-12 is a highway in Spain known as the Autovía del Camino de Santiago between Pamplona and Burgos.

It follows the route of the N-111 passing via Logroño and Burgos where it becomes the Autovía A-231.
