= Autovía AS-III =

Autovía AS-III
- Autovía del Acero

Route information
- Length: 24 km (15 mi)

Major junctions
- From: Langreo
- To: Avilés

Location
- Country: Spain

Highway system
- Highways in Spain; Autopistas and autovías; National Roads

The AS-III is a highway in Asturias, Spain that connects Langreo and Avilés. Despite being a splitting of the AS-17 road, it continues working with this name.

The first section of the motorway was opened in October 2011 and links Lugo de Llanera with Viella, Siero.

On 12 July 2014, the section between Riaño, Langreo and San Miguel de la Barreda was opened. This section has three tunnels and cost €108m.
