= Autovía A-54 =

Freeway in Spain

Autovía A-54

Route information
- Length: 102 km (63 mi)

Major junctions
- From: Lugo
- To: Santiago de Compostela

Location
- Country: Spain

Highway system
- Highways in Spain; Autopistas and autovías; National Roads

The Autovía A-54 is a freeway in Spain. It connects Santiago de Compostela with its airport with junctions onto the N-550, N-634 and Lugo via N-547.

This 4-lane newly designed freeway (U.K. motorway) began its construction process in February, 2009. It links Lugo and Santiago de Compostela (102 km). When complete, this infrastructure will allow traffic from outside Galicia to have an easy and safe access to the capital of Galicia (Santiago) and the central area of the Galician Rias. The current freeway alternative for traffic going from the central area of the province of Lugo to the Galicia Rias is following the A-6 toll-free freeway (Lugo-Coruña) to the junction with the AP-9 near Betanzos. From there, most vehicles use the Coruña-Santiago toll-freeway as a fast and safe way to reach the Rías. When the A-54 construction is complete, this route will not be used any longer. The A-54 is a toll-free freeway.
