= Autovía MA-24 =

Motorway in Spain

Autovía MA-24
- Autovía de Acceso a Málaga Este

Route information
- Length: 7.77 km (4.83 mi)

Major junctions
- From: A-7 (La Cala del Moral)
- To: A-7 (Miraflores, Málaga)

Location
- Country: Spain

Highway system
- Highways in Spain; Autopistas and autovías; National Roads

Autovía MA-24 or Autovía de Acceso a Málaga Este is a Spanish highway that connects the Autovía A-7 at Cala del Moral, Málaga, with that same road at a further point. It is managed by the Spanish Government, and it is an important access to the eastern suburbs of Málaga City.

== Exits ==
Westbound (Málaga)		Eastbound (La Cala del Moral)	
Exit		Exit	
Number	Direction	Direction	Number
	E-15 A-7 Almería Málaga Algeciras A-45 Córdoba - Granada - Seville		
1	MA-185 Totalán Centro Comercial Rincón de la Victoria		1
2	N-340 La Cala del Moral		2
3	La Araña		3
4	Málaga Este El Palo		4
		A-7001 Olías	5
	E-15 A-7 Málaga Algeciras A-45 Córdoba - Granada - Seville		
