= A3 motorway (Extremadura) =

Road in Extremadura, Spain

Coordinates: 38.4266°N 6.4177°W

The A3 motorway (Autovía EX-A3) is a road in Extremadura connecting Zafra and Jerez de los Caballeros.
