= Autovía CV-80 =

Motorway in Spain

Autovía CV-80
- Autovía Sax-Castalla

Route information
- Length: 14 km (8.7 mi)

Major junctions
- From: A-31 (Sax)
- To: A-7 (Castalla)

Location
- Country: Spain

Highway system
- Highways in Spain; Autopistas and autovías; National Roads

The Autovía CV-80 or Autovía Sax-Castalla is a Spanish motorway, which connects the A-31 in Sax with the A-7 in Castalla. It has a length of 14 kilometres (8.7 mi), and is managed by the Valencian Community. The autovía crosses two comarques: Alto Vinalopó and Alcoià.
