= Autopista AP-61 =

Autopista AP-61
- Autopista Segovia - San Rafael
- AP-61 in red

Route information
- Length: 28 km (17 mi)

Major junctions
- From: San Rafael
- To: Segovia

Location
- Country: Spain

Highway system
- Highways in Spain; Autopistas and autovías; National Roads

The Autopista AP-61 (also known as Autopista Segovia - San Rafael) is an autopista in the province of Segovia, in the community of Castile and León, Spain. It starts at the Autopista AP-6 near the village of San Rafael and ends at the SG-20 (originally part of the N-110) on the southern outskirts of the city of Segovia, while running parallel to the N-603. It opened in 2004.
