= Autovía LO-20 =

Motorway in Spain

Autovía LO-20

Route information
- Length: 18.16 km (11.28 mi)

Major junctions
- From: Agoncillo
- To: Fuenmayor

Location
- Country: Spain

Highway system
- Highways in Spain; Autopistas and autovías; National Roads

The Autovía LO-20 is an urban autovía in Logroño, La Rioja, Spain. Intended as a ring road, it currently runs from east to west along the south of the city, as an upgrade of the N-232 road.
