= A1 motorway (Aragon) =

Motorway in Aragon

Coordinates: 41.5621°N 0.6775°W

Autovía ARA-A1

Route information
- Length: 5.3 km (3.3 mi)

Major junctions
- From: Villafranca de Ebro
- To: El Burgo de Ebro

Location
- Country: Spain
- Major cities: Zaragoza

Highway system
- Highways in Spain; Autopistas and autovías; National Roads

The A1 or ARA-A1 is a 5.3 kilometres (3.3 mi) long motorway in Aragon, Spain connecting Villafranca de Ebro (roundabout with N-II) and El Burgo de Ebro (roundabout with N-232) via a junction with AP-2. It is a partial beltway around Zaragoza, and is operational since 2008.
