= Autovía A-24 =

Proposed motorway from Daroca to Calatayud (Spain)

Autovía A-24
- Autovía Daroca-Burgos
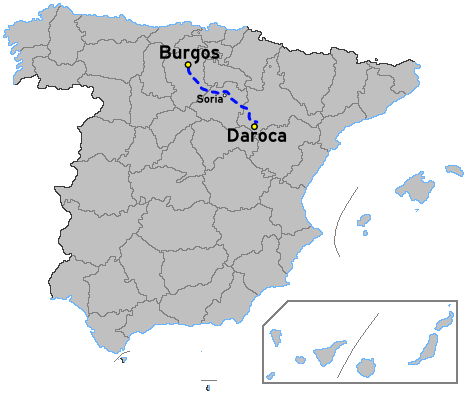

Major junctions
- From: Daroca
- To: Burgos

Location
- Country: Spain

Highway system
- Highways in Spain; Autopistas and autovías; National Roads

The Autovía A-24 is a proposed highway in Aragon, Spain between Daroca and Burgos.

It is an upgrade of the N-234 and will link the Autovía A-23 east of Daroca with the Autovía A-2 and Autopista AP-1 at Burgos. It will be 43.3 km.
