= N-521 road (Spain) =

Road in Spain

National road N-521
- Carretera nacional N-521

Major junctions
- From: Trujillo
- To: Portuguese frontier

Location
- Country: Spain

Highway system
- Highways in Spain; Autopistas and autovías; National Roads

The N-521 is a Highway in western Spain. It runs from the Portugal border to the Autovía A-5.

It starts at the border in the Sierra de São Mamede overlooked by the castle and hill top village of Marvão where it becomes the N-246 and then IP-2 to Lisbon.

The first town in Spain is Valencia de Alcántara, after which it crosses the Alburrel River then the wooded Sierra Brava and Sierra de San Pedro. It then follows the Salor River to Cáceres and a junction with the N-630 which is overlooked by La Virgen de la Montaña. The road then crosses the plain to Trujillo with the Tamuja River. At Trujillo the road meets the Autovía A-5, junction 253 km.
