= Autovía A-38 =

Motorway in Spain

Autovía A-38

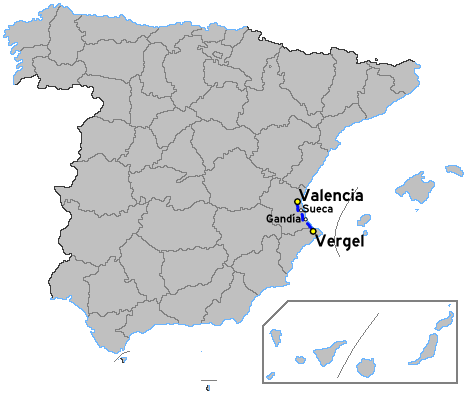

Location
- Country: Spain

Highway system
- Highways in Spain; Autopistas and autovías; National Roads

The Autovía A-38 is a motorway in the Valencian Community, Spain.

It commences south of Valencia and heads in a generally south easterly direction along the Mediterranean coast, providing a free alternative to the AP-7 autopista; as an upgrade of the N-332.

It was inaugurated in July 2008 in Sueca, and as of 2018, was still under construction or in the planning stages. They are currently building the sections of the Cullera and Favara highway. Soon, the road of Gandia will be extended and split, reaching up to Ondara. In addition, the road of Benidorm, as well as other roads, are planned to be expanded: Benissa (under construction with possibly extra sections), Altea, Villajoyosa, and more. The multiple section project would be located between Valencia and Gata de Gorgos.
