= Autovía A-79 =

Motorway in Spain

Autovía A-79
- Vía Parque Alicante-Elche
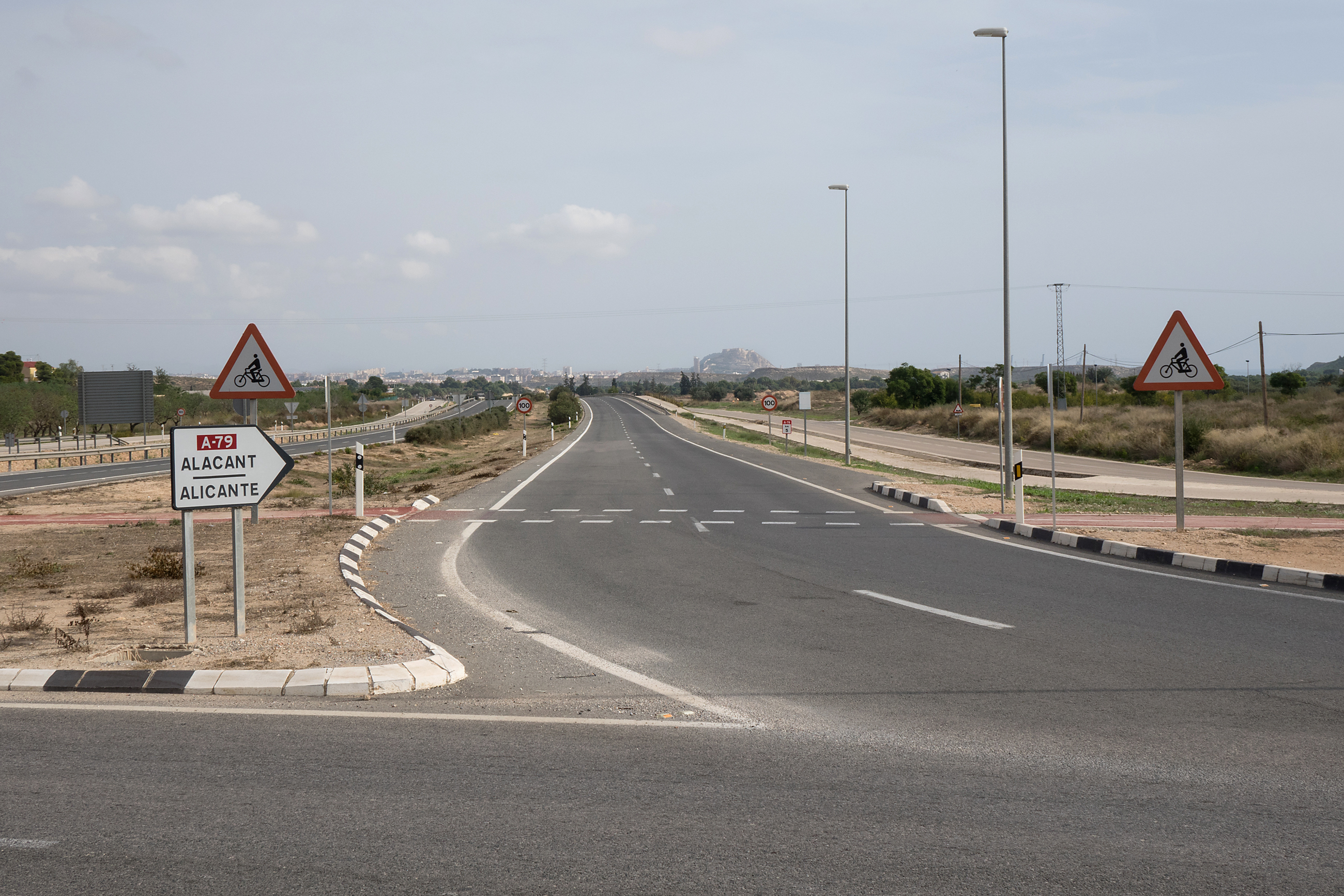
- Looking north towards Alicante

Route information
- Length: 14 km (8.7 mi)

Major junctions
- From: Alicante
- J → Autovía A-31; J → Airport; J → Elche
- To: Elche

Location
- Country: Spain

Highway system
- Highways in Spain; Autopistas and autovías; National Roads

The Autovía A-79 is a local highway between Alicante and Elche, Spain. This pathway is usually known as Vía Parque Alicante-Elche. Its length is about 14 km. This road runs from the junction with Autovía A-31, near to Alicante city, towards the junction with Autovía EL-20, the access road to Elche.

Officially, this route is divided into two parts. One part is the first 6 km, through Alicante municipality and named autovía A-79, and the other part is until the end, through Elche municipality and named local road CV-86.
