= Autovía C-14 =

Motorway in Spain

Autovía C-14
- Autovia Salou-La Seu d'Urgell

Major junctions
- From: Salou
- To: La Seu d'Urgell

Location
- Country: Spain

Highway system
- Highways in Spain; Autopistas and autovías; National Roads

The C-14 is a highway in Catalonia, Spain from La Seu d'Urgell to Salou through Reus.

Nowadays is a highway from Salou to Reus and in the future the rest of the C-14 road will be upgraded to a highway. The N-145 from La Seu d'Urgell to Andorra will be added to C-14 too.
