= Autovía A-27 =

Motorway from Tarragona to Montblanch (Spain)

Autovía A-27
- Autovía Tarragona-Lleida
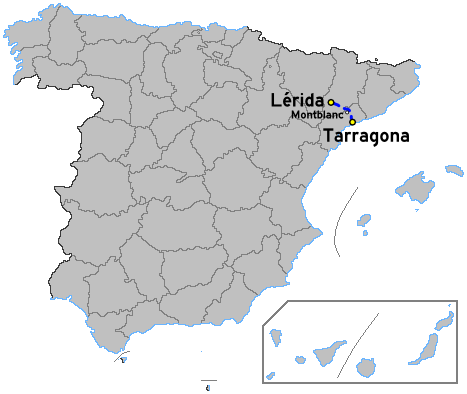

Route information
- Length: 110 km (68 mi)

Major junctions
- From: Tarragona
- To: Lleida

Location
- Country: Spain

Highway system
- Highways in Spain; Autopistas and autovías; National Roads

Autovía A-27 or Autovía Tarragona-Lleida is the planned upgrade of a section of the actual N-240 Spanish road, managed by the Spanish Government, between Tarragona and Lleida (both cities in Catalonia).

The upgrading will be constructed mainly over the actual N-240 road except in some specific stretches (such as the future bypass of Valls) where an alternative itinerary will be drawn.

List of towns connected by this section of the actual N-240, and hence by the future A-27, includes Tarragona, Valls, Montblanc and Les Borges Blanques.
