= Autovía B-21 =

Motorway in Spain

Autovía B-21

Route information
- Maintained by Ministerio de Fomento

Major junctions
- From: Autovía A-2, Autovía B-20
- To: Port of Barcelona

Location
- Country: Spain
- Autonomous community: Catalonia
- Province: Barcelona

Highway system
- Highways in Spain; Autopistas and autovías; National Roads; Primary Highways in Catalonia

The Autovía B-21 is a Catalan Spanish motorway that is an access road to the Port of Barcelona from the A-2 and the B-20 (Ronda de Dalt).
