= Autovía A-92N =

Highway in Andalusia, Spain

Autovía A-92N

Route information
- Maintained by Junta de Andalucía
- Length: 119.60 km (74.32 mi)

Major junctions
- From: Guadix
- To: A-91 (Puerto Lumbreras)

Location
- Country: Spain
- Towns: Guadix, Gor, Baza, Cúllar, Chirivel, Vélez-Rubio

Highway system
- Highways in Spain; Autopistas and autovías; National Roads

The Autovía A-92N is a highway in Spain. It goes from Guadix (Granada) to the limit of Andalusia with Murcia, where the highway connects with the A-91.
