= Autovía A-334 =

Highway in Spain

The Autovía A-334 is a highway in Spain. It passes through Andalusia.
