= Autovía A-308 =

Highway in Andalusia, Spain

The Autovía A-308 is a highway in Spain. It passes through Andalusia.
