= Autovía CA-33 =

Motorway in Spain

Autovía CA-33

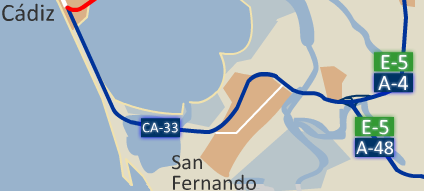

Route information
- Length: 13 km (8.1 mi)

Major junctions
- From: Cádiz
- To: San Fernando

Location
- Country: Spain

Highway system
- Highways in Spain; Autopistas and autovías; National Roads

The Autovía CA-33 is an autovía in the province of Cádiz, Andalusia, Spain. It runs south-east from the ciyt of Cádiz to the nearby city of San Fernando, and from there to the Autovía A-4 and the Autovía A-48, for a distance of 13 km (8 miles). Originally part of the N-IV road, it received the CA-33 designation in 2003.
