= Autovía A-383 =

Highway in Andalusia, Spain

Autovía A-383
- Acceso Este a La Línea
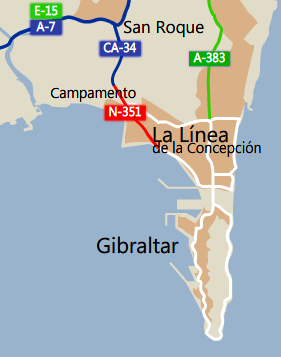

Route information
- Length: 7.2 km (4.5 mi)

Major junctions
- North end: A-7 / E15
- South end: La Linea de la Concepción

Location
- Country: Spain
- Autonomous community: Andalusia
- Province: Cádiz

Highway system
- Highways in Spain; Autopistas and autovías; National Roads

The Autovía A-383 is a highway in Spain. It passes through Andalusia. The A-383 is an Andalusian regional highway in the province of Cádiz . It is part of the Basic Articulation Network within the Andalusian Road Catalogue .

The highway provides access to La Línea de la Concepción and Gibraltar from the east. It is known as the "Higuerón Road" because the Higuerón Viewpoint is located next to it.

== Route ==
It begins at exit 124 of the A-7, which also provides access to the beaches of La Alcaidesa . It continues south on a winding, steep slope (up to 8%), ending at a roundabout at kilometer point 4+700.

From here, it's a single-lane road in each direction, crossing the Zabal Bajo shopping area and often experiencing traffic jams in the morning. The road ends at a roundabout on María Guerrero Street in La Línea.

Exit Number Exit Name Highway that connects

The Alcaidesa  - San Roque - Cadiz - Estepona - Malaga
E-15   A-7

Start of the Western Access Highway to La Línea

2

service road - El Higuerón viewpoint

3
Santa Margarita  - change of direction

La Línea de la Concepción - Gibraltar - airport continues along the A-383 road

A-383 

Service area Future There are plans to build a second phase of the highway, along a route slightly further west than the current one, bordering the Zabal industrial estate. This variant will feature a bike lane and will end at the Ronda Norte de La Línea, between the Gran Sur shopping center and the municipal vehicle depot.

As of December 2008, work had not begun due to disagreements between the Andalusian Regional Government and the City Council on the issue of land expropriations. [ 1 ]

As of May 2020, the Andalusian Government has submitted a review of the expired project and updated the project with a duration of 12 months. [ 2 ] [ 3 ]
