= Autovía A-376 =

Highway in Spain

The Autovía A-376 is a highway in Spain. It passes through Andalusia.
