= Autovía AG-64 =

Autovia in Spain

The Autovía AG-64 (also known as Autovía Ferrol - Vilalba) is a local autovía in Galicia, Spain. It is 56 km (35 miles) long and runs from just north of the city of Ferrol to the Autovía A-8 near the town of Vilalba. It was built between 2003 and 2010.
