= Autovía A-306 =

Highway in Andalusia, Spain

The Autovía A-306 is a highway in Spain. It passes through Andalusia.
