= Autopista Ma-20 =

Spanish freeway

Autopista Ma-20
- Vía de Cintura
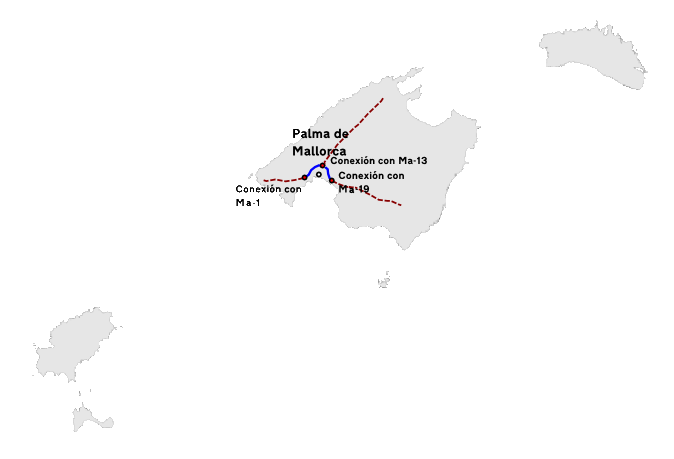

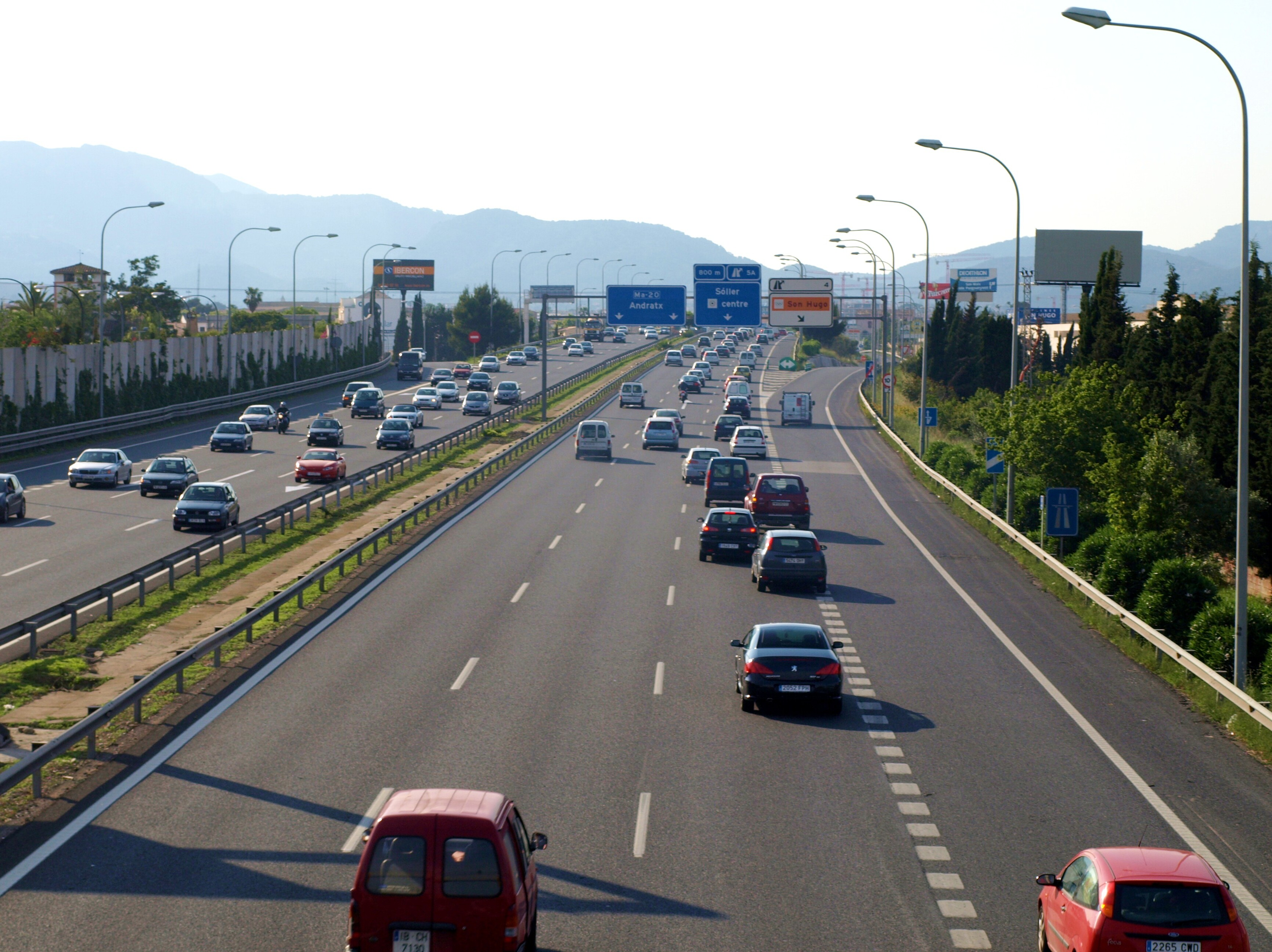

Route information
- Maintained by Council of Majorca
- Length: 11 km (6.8 mi)

Major junctions
- Orbital around Palma de Mallorca
- From: Ma-19 (Palma)
- To: Ma-1 (Cala Major)

Location
- Country: Spain

Highway system
- Highways in Spain; Autopistas and autovías; National Roads

The Ma-20 or Vía de Cintura is a Spanish freeway that bypasses the city of Palma de Mallorca. It is 11 km long, and was built in 1990 to reduce traffic in the city centre.
