= Autovía Z-40 =

Autovia in Zaragoza, Spain

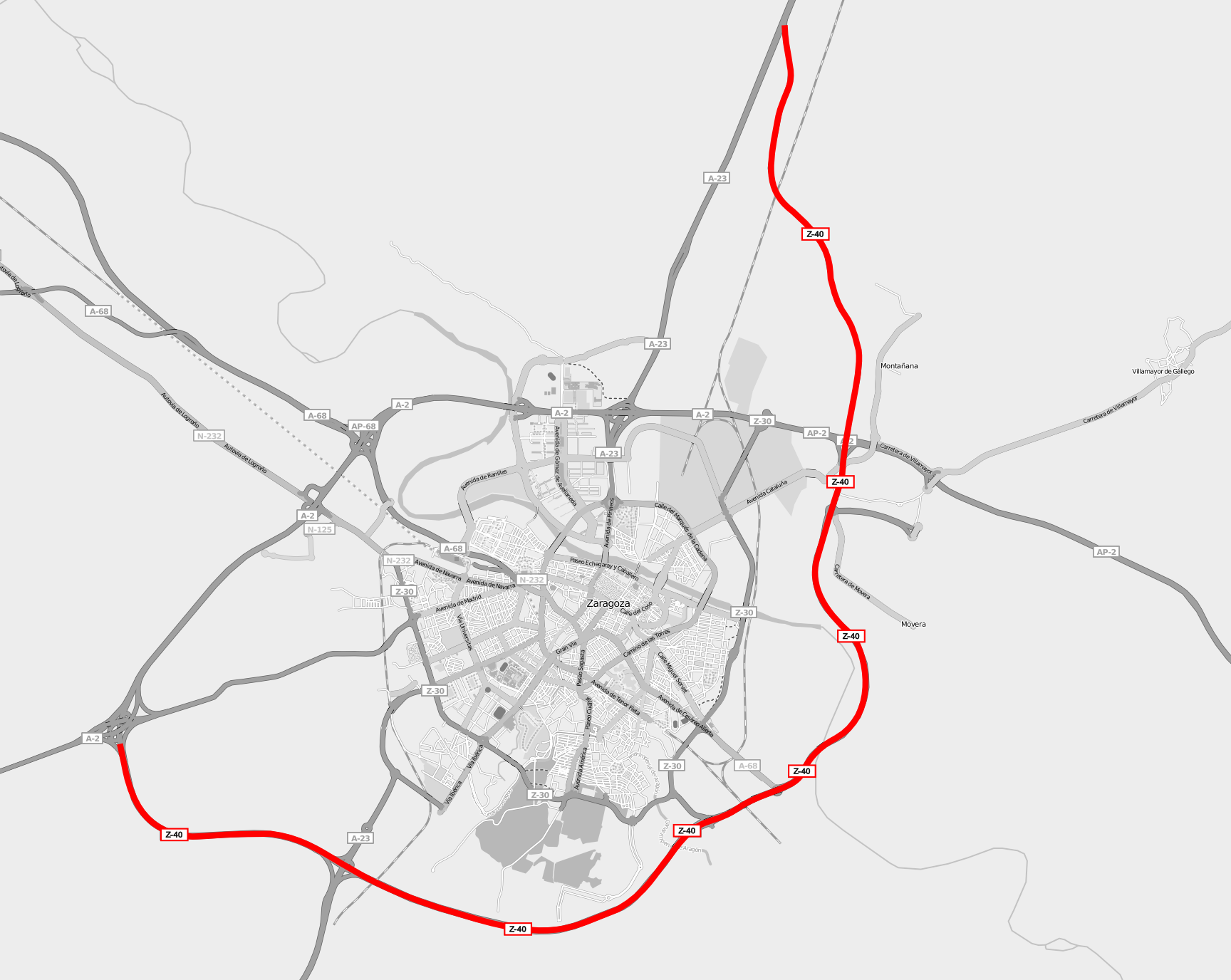
Z-40

The Autovía Z-40, also known as the Cuarto cinturón de Zaragoza (The fourth belt of Zaragoza), is an autovía in Zaragoza, Aragon, Spain, forming a 34 km (21.1 mile) beltway clockwise around the city.

It consists of three sections:

- The 13 km (8.1 mile) long northern section shares its route with the Autovía A-2, running from the western outskirts of Zaragoza to the northeastern suburb of Santa Isabel, where it connects with the Autovía A-23 north to Huesca. It also connects with the Autopista AP-68 and the site of Expo 2008.
- The 7 km (4.3 mile) long eastern section, opened in June 2008, runs from Santa Isabel to the Autovía A-68 near the southeastern suburb of La Cartuja Baja.
- The 14 km (8.7 mile) long southern section runs from the A-68 back to the A-2, connecting with the A-23 south to Teruel and Valencia.
