= Autovía A-60 =

Proposed highway between Valladolid and Leon in Spain

Autovía A-60

Route information
- Length: 130 km (81 mi)

Major junctions
- From: Valladolid
- To: Leon

Location
- Country: Spain

Highway system
- Highways in Spain; Autopistas and autovías; National Roads

The Autovía A-60 is a proposed highway in Central Spain between Valladolid and Leon. It will be an upgrade of the N-601.
