= Autovía A-381 =

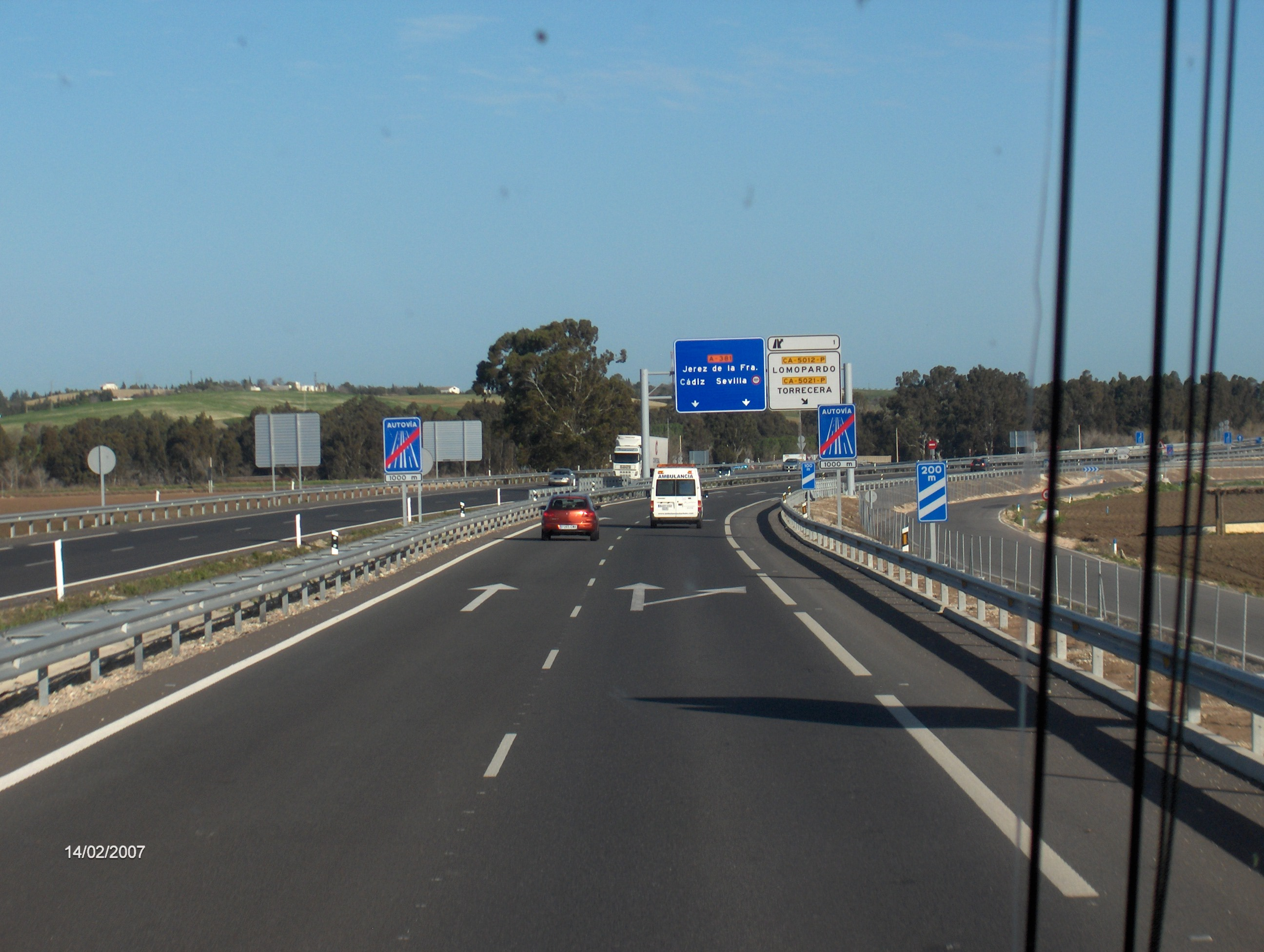
Autovía A-381 near Jerez de la Frontera

The Autovía A-381 is a local autovía in Andalusia, Spain. It is 88 km (55 miles) long and runs from the Autopista AP-4 at Jerez de la Frontera to the Autovía A-7 at Los Barrios, near Algeciras. Built between 2004 and 2006, it runs parallel to the former C-440 road, including through Los Alcornocales Natural Park.
