= Autovía CA-36 =

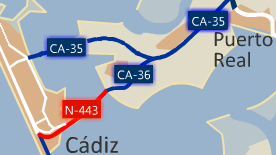
The road before the N-443 was renamed as CA-36.

The Autovía CA-36 is a Spanish highway that connects the Autovía CA-35 with José León de Carranza Bridge, from where it continues as a national road, but with the same nomenclature, until the Autovía CA-33 in Cádiz City. It has a total length of 5.68 kilometers. The last part of the road used to be called N-443.
