= Autovía A-357 =

Highway in Spain

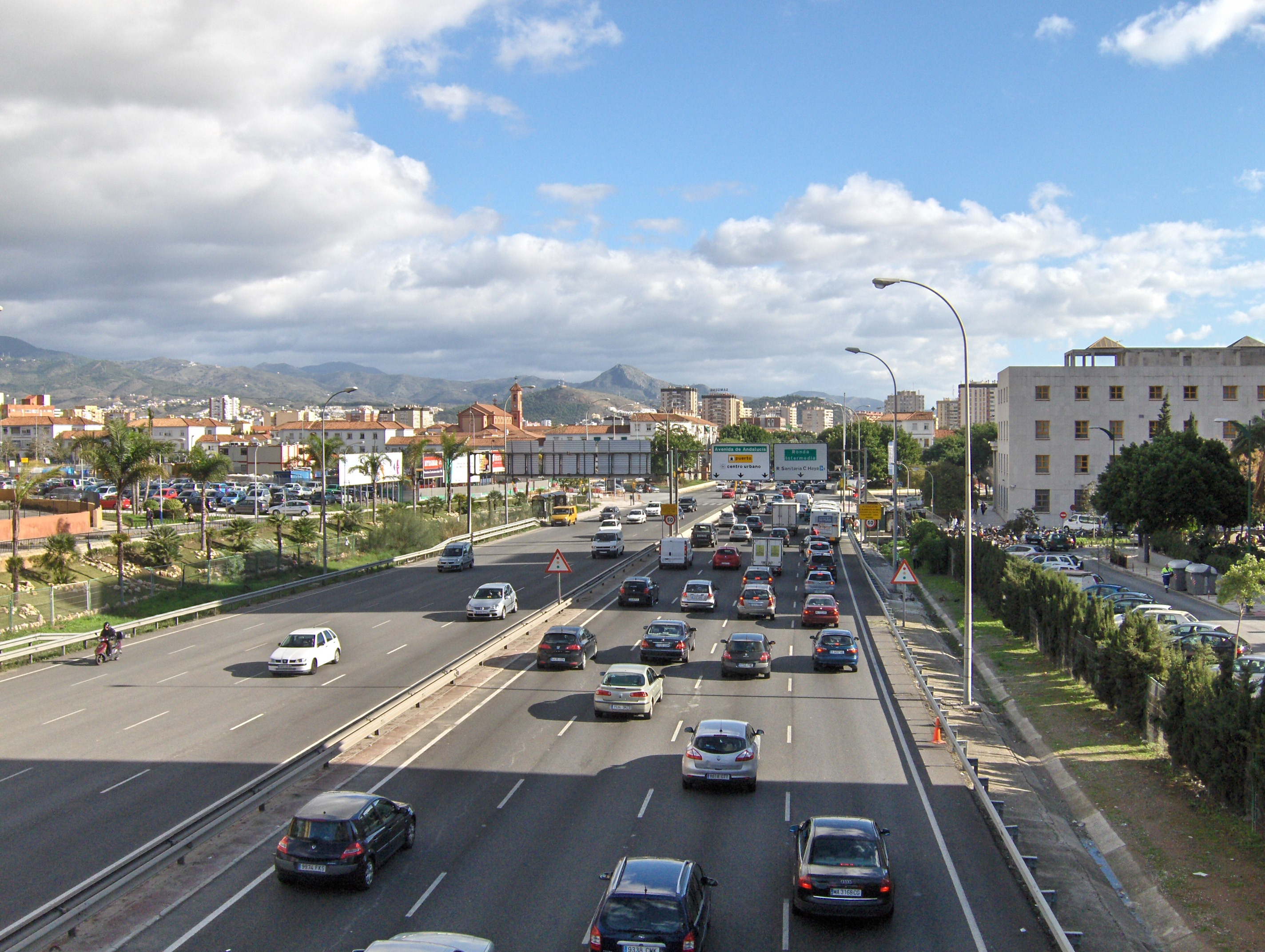

The Autovía A-357 is a highway in Spain. It passes through Andalusia.
