= Autovía BU-11 =

Autovia in Spain

The Autovía BU-11 is a 4 km (2.5 mile) long autovía in the city of Burgos, Castile and León, Spain, running south from the city centre to the junction of the Autovía A-1 and the Autovía BU-30. It was built to relieve congestion in the city centre caused by traffic travelling between Madrid and France (via the A-1) or Santander (via the N-623).
