= Autovía T-11 =

Highway in Catalonia, Spain

Autovía T-11

Autovía T-11 is a 17,3 km long primary highway in Catalonia connecting Reus (and its airport) and Tarragona.
