= Alcolea del Pinar =

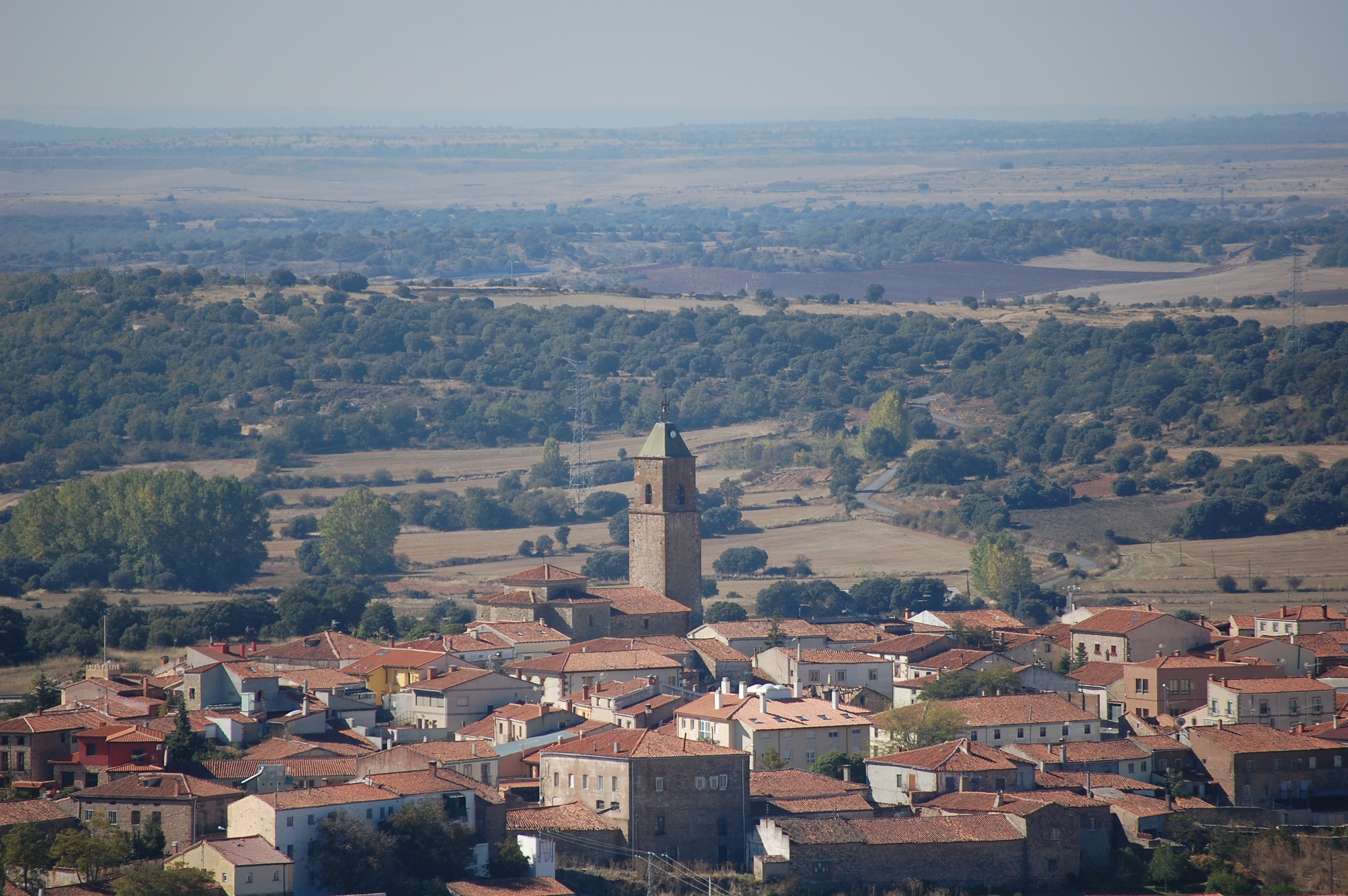

- Coat of arms

- Location within Province of Guadalajara Location within Castilla-La Mancha Location within Spain
- Coordinates: 41°02′13″N 2°27′56″W
- Country: Spain
- Autonomous community: Castile-La Mancha
- Province: Guadalajara
- Municipality: Alcolea del Pinar

Area
  - Total: 113.68 km^{2} (43.89 sq mi)
- Elevation: 1,203 m (3,947 ft)

Population (2025-01-01)
  - Total: 357
  - Density: 3.14/km^{2} (8.13/sq mi)
- Time zone: UTC+1 (CET)
  - Summer (DST): UTC+2 (CEST)

Alcolea del Pinar is a municipality located in the province of Guadalajara, Castile-La Mancha, Spain. According to the 2004 census (INE), the municipality had a population of 406 inhabitants.

== History ==
It is located in the north of the province on the border with the province of Soria, and its importance is linked to its role as main crossroads. Its main street (Calle Real, Royal Street) was the old main road between Madrid and Barcelona, and Alcolea was the junction point to the road to Teruel and southern Aragon. Moreover, a little northward, in the municipality of Medinaceli, there is another main junction, this one heading north, towards Soria, representing the main access from Madrid to La Rioja and Navarre. As a result, Alcolea del Pinar has been an important hub for the road-related services, with a relatively large Guardia Civil (rural police) station, devoted to traffic control, and a base of the Ministry of Public Works, for the maintenance works of the A-2 highway (Madrid-Barcelona). Currently, the new high-speed rail line between Madrid and Barcelona goes just by side of the town, parallel to the A-2 highway. As a matter of fact, Alcolea del Pinar is situated at the highest point of the A-2 highway between Madrid and Barcelona (1200 meters above sea level, 3600 feet.

== Tourist attractions ==
Alcolea del Pinar has several tourist attractions, the most relevant being the 'Casa de Piedra' (Stone house). The 'Casa de Piedra' was built by Lino Bueno in the early 20th century, within a solid, large rock. With the single use of a pick, Lino Bueno succeeded in creating a real home within the rock, with no other construction material but the rock itself. The construction took 16 years, and Lino Bueno died when he was still working in the creation of another room on the upper floor.
