= Liédena =

Human settlement in Spain

Coordinates: 42°37′N 1°16′W

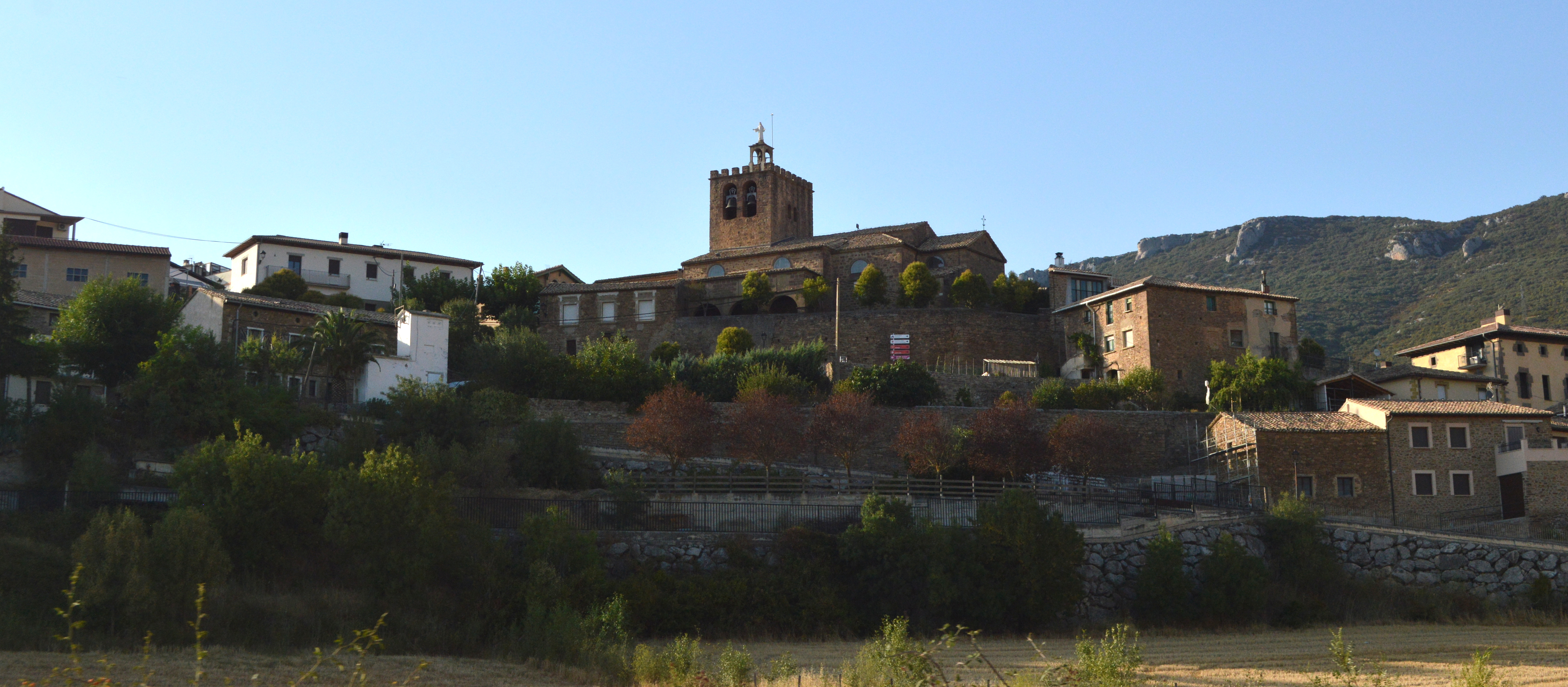
Liedena

Liédena is a town and municipality located in the province and autonomous community of Navarre, northern Spain.
