= Autovía RM-2 =

The Autovía RM-2 (also known as Autovía Alhama - Campo de Cartagena) is a local autovía in the Region of Murcia, Spain. It is 36 km (22.4 miles) long and runs from the Autovía A-7 at Alhama de Murcia to the Autovía A-30 near the village of El Albujon, around 10 km (6 miles) west of the town of Torre-Pacheco and around 15 km (9 miles) north of the city of Cartagena. It opened in April 2008.
