= Autopista AP-4 =

Motorway from Seville to Cadiz in Spain

Autopista AP-4
- Autopista del Sur
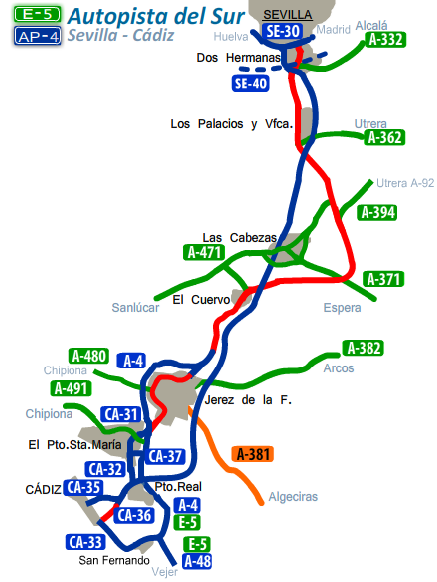

Route information
- Part of E5
- Length: 86 km (53 mi)

Major junctions
- From: Sevilla
- To: Cádiz

Location
- Country: Spain

Highway system
- Highways in Spain; Autopistas and autovías; National Roads

The Autopista AP-4 (also called Autopista del Sur) is a Spanish autopista route which starts in Seville and ends in Cádiz. It has a total length of 123.80 km.

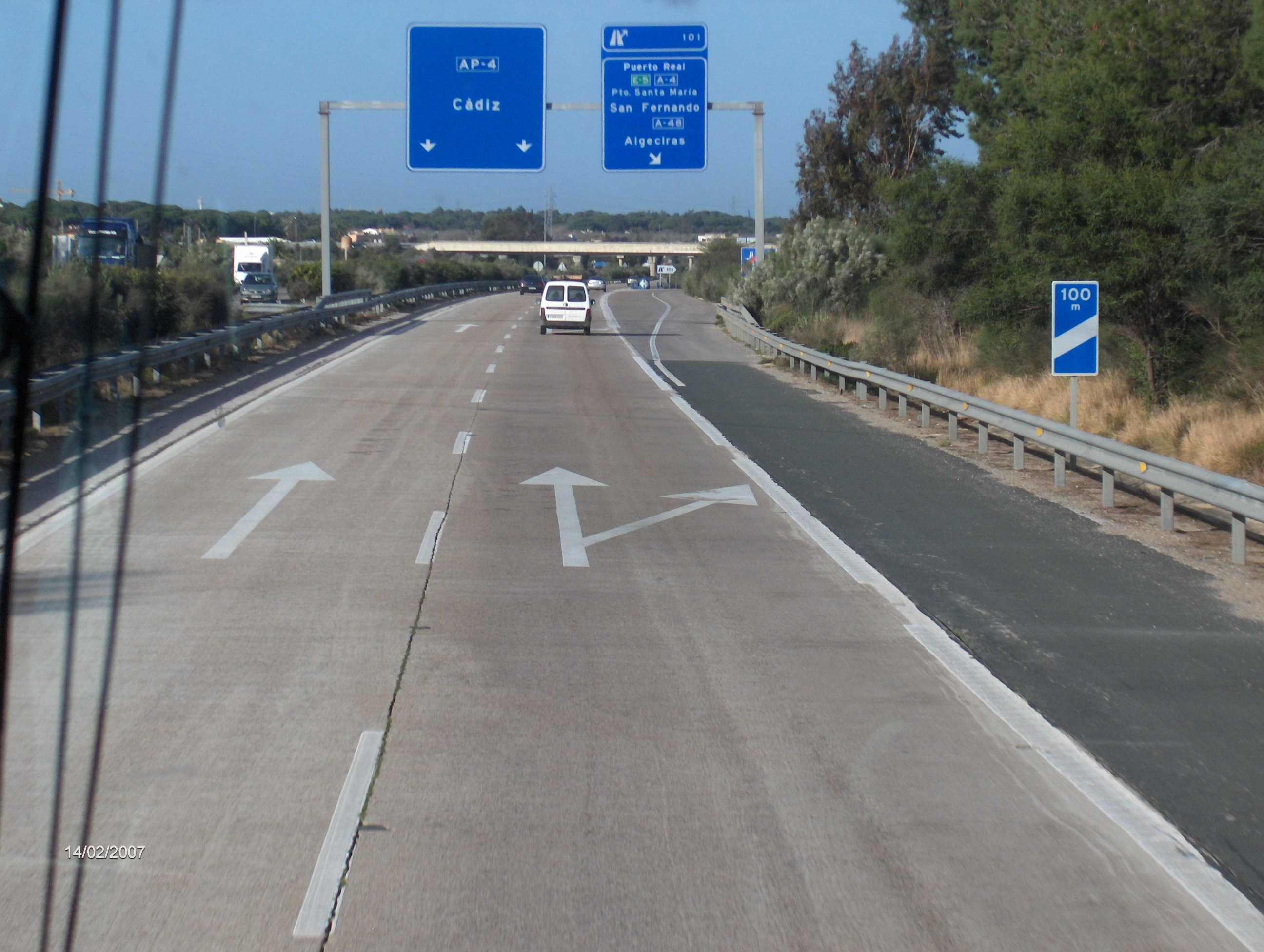
The Autopista AP-4 near Cádiz
