= Autovía AS-I =

Motorway in Spain

Autovía AS-I
- Autovía Minera

Route information
- Length: 34 km (21 mi)
- Existed: 2003–present

Major junctions
- From: Mieres
- To: Gijón

Location
- Country: Spain

Highway system
- Highways in Spain; Autopistas and autovías; National Roads

The AS-I is a highway in Asturias, Spain that connects Mieres and Gijón. It is also known as Autovía Minera because of its travel through the mining towns in Asturias like Mieres or Langreo, passing near La Camocha coal mine before finishing in Gijón.

The AS-I was made between 2000 and 2003 by the Government of the Principality of Asturias.

The last junctions opened were the Enlace de Ceares in Gijón, in 2007, and the one in Pola de Siero.

== Route ==
Km	Location	Link with
0	Mieres	A-66
9	Langreo, Alto Nalón, Puerto de Tarna	AS-117
9	Olloniego	AS-116
14	El Berrón	AS-246
14	Carbayín	SI-16
17	Pola de Siero	A-64
19	Noreña	NO-2
23	La Braña, Noreña, Valdepumares, Madera	AS-246
31	Mareo	
34	Gijón	A-8
