= Madrid–Asturias high-speed rail line =

Train path from northwest to central Spain

Coordinates: 40.9981°N 4.2891°W

Madrid–Asturias high-speed line
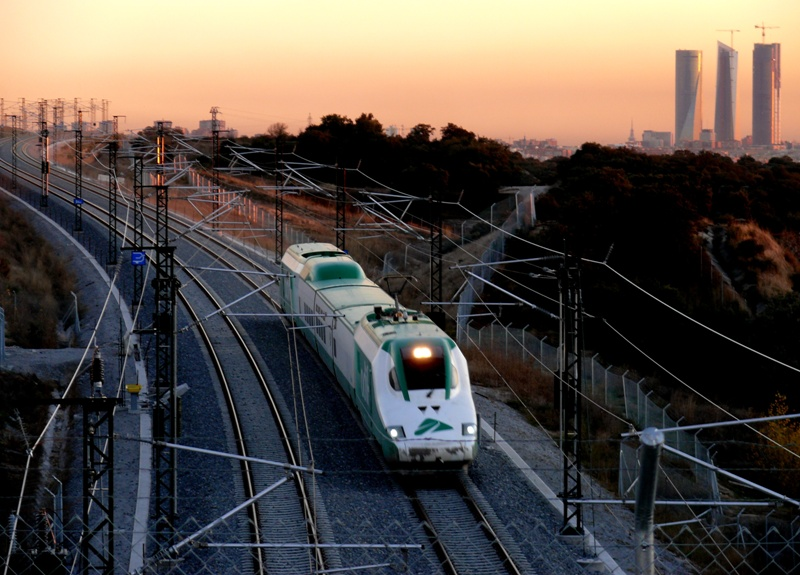
- Rail lab (ADIF series 330) in El Goloso (Madrid) heading towards Colmenar Viejo eleven days before the opening of the line.

Overview
- Native name: Línea de Alta Velocidad Madrid - Asturias
- Status: operational
- Locale: Spain
- Termini: Madrid Chamartín; Pola de Lena
- Stations: 5

Service
- Type: high-speed rail
- Ridership: 4.1 million (2017-8)

History
- Opened: 29 September 2015; 10 years ago

Technical
- Line length: 342.3 km (212.7 mi)
- Track gauge: 1,435 mm (4 ft 8 1/2 in) standard gauge
- Electrification: 25 kV 50 Hz AC
- Operating speed: 350 km/h (220 mph)

The Madrid–Asturias high-speed rail line (Spanish language: Línea de Alta Velocidad Madrid - Asturias) connects the city of Madrid with the autonomous community of Asturias and was inaugurated on 29 November 2023. The line is built to standard gauge and gauge changers are provided at strategic points to allow interchange with older Spanish railways which were built to Iberian gauge.

== History ==
The line was inaugurated in three stages.

Its first 179.6 km (111.6 mi) section Madrid–Segovia–Valladolid opened for commercial service on 22 December 2007 and is the first installment of a high-speed rail corridor in the north and northwest of Spain. AVE services reduced journey times between Madrid and Valladolid from 2½ hours to 56 minutes at an average speed of 192 kilometres per hour (119 mph). On 26 January 2009 Avant S-121 trains were put in service for the same route and covered the distance between Madrid and Valladolid in 1 hour and 10 minutes traveling at speeds up to 250 km/h.

The second 162.7 km (101.1 mi) section Valladolid–Venta de Baños–León opened on 29 September 2015 and was built at a cost of €1.62bn for operation at up to 350 km/h. Since then the journey time between Madrid and León was cut by 44 min to 2 h 6 min on AVE trains.

In September 2021 the first test runs started through Pajares Base Tunnel (Variante de Pajares) in the railway between La Robla and Campomanes. The third section between León and Pola de Lena via the Pajares Base Tunnel was inaugurated on 29 November 2023 after 20 years of works and an investment of €4.00bn only for the 50 km (31 mi) section between La Robla and Pola de Lena. The entire line put in commercial service on 30 November 2023, initially by Alvia trains connecting Madrid and rest of Spanish high-speed network to Asturias up to the city of Gijón. AVE services on gauge-changing Class 106 trains were introduced in May 2024.

== Features ==
This line is constructed for trains running at up to 350 kilometres per hour (220 mph). ERTMS type II signaling and ASFA digital diversion clearance of 220 kilometres per hour (140 mph) and a reduction of over 70 kilometres (43 mi) (28%) compared to the general layout of the Northern or Imperial Line, due to the tunnels of San Pedro and Guadarrama through Sierra de Guadarrama, 9 and 28.4 km (5.6 and 17.6 mi) respectively. The Guadarrama tunnel, is the longest railway tunnel in Spain and the fifth longest railway tunnel in the world and trains can travel through the tunnel at a maximum speed of 310 kilometres per hour (190 mph).

In the section between Valladolid and León the route comprises 78.7 km (48.9 mi) of double track and two single-track sections totalling 84 km (52 mi). Gauge changers are installed at Chamartin Valdestillas, Valladolid, León and Villamuriel south of Palencia and this has reduced travel times on all routes between Madrid and Spain's north-northwest.

The 20.2 kilometres (12.6 mi) section between León and La Robla remains in conventional Iberian gauge line for a maximum speed of 160 kilometres per hour (99 mph), that was initially due to be modernized to high-speed standards along with an additional standard gauge track by end 2024. However, as of December 2025 this section remains in coventional standards due to various delays in planning.

The 49.7 kilometres (30.9 mi) section between La Robla and Pola de Lena is a double electrified track for maximum speeds of 275 kilometres per hour (171 mph). 80% of this section consists of tunnels of a total length of 40 kilometres (25 mi), including the 25 kilometres (16 mi) long Pajares Base Tunnel, the seventh longest railway tunnel in Europe that runs under a very mountainous area between the Province of León and the Principality of Asturias.

The line further connects the cities of Oviedo and Gijón in the Spanish region of Asturias via conventional line to the high-speed network.

The line is connected with the following other HSR (High-speed rail) lines:

- Madrid–Galicia high-speed rail line, and this in turn with the Atlantic Axis high-speed rail line.
- HSR Valladolid - Burgos and this in turn to the future HSR sections Burgos - Vitoria, Logroño-Miranda de Ebro and the Basque Y.
- Other high-speed lines departing from Madrid, via Chamartin and Atocha stations.

== Route ==
Madrid–Asturias high-speed line in red

(The figures indicate distance from Madrid)

- 415.35 km (258.09 mi) Pola de Lena
- Campomanes gauge changer
- 365.65 km (227.20 mi) La Robla
- Gauge changer
- 345.450 km (214.653 mi) León AV (166,141 km from Valladolid Campo Grande)
- 344.277 km (213.924 mi) Junction Estadio Municipal
- 343.879 km (213.677 mi) Classification changer
- 339.527 km (210.972 mi) Vilecha gauge changer
- 338.245 km (210.176 mi) Junction Vilecha
- 320.332 km (199.045 mi) PCA Luengos
- 297.591 km (184.914 mi) Crossover Las Arenas
- 276.537 km (171.832 mi) Villada AV maintenance center
- 259.999 km (161.556 mi) Crossover Las Barreras
- 244.212 km (151.746 mi) PCA Becerril
- 231.315 km (143.732 mi) Level crossing Los Tres Pasos
- 230.627 km (143.305 mi) Palencia
- 224.754 km (139.656 mi) Villamuriel changer
- 223.530 km (138.895 mi) Junction Cerrato AV
- 222.699 km (138.379 mi) Desvío 10 km (6.2 mi) of the Junction Cerrato
- 217.578 km (135.197 mi) Junction Venta de Baños AV
- 208.447 km (129.523 mi) Crossover Dueñas AV
- 198.097 km (123.092 mi) PCA Valoria
- 187.360 km (116.420 mi) Junction Las Pajareras
- 186.283 km (115.751 mi) Junction Canal del Duero
- 181.241 km (112.618 mi) Level crossing La Pilarica
- 179.6 km (111.6 mi) Valladolid-Campo Grande
- 173.1 km (107.6 mi) Level crossing (Pinar de Antequera)
- 168.0 km (104.4 mi) Rio Duero
- conventional line Madrid-Irun (Gauge changer)
- 159.6 km (99.2 mi) Valdestillas / Transition double track to single track
- 144.0 km (89.5 mi) Conventional Line Madrid-Irun
- Link L.A.V. Olmedo-Zamora-Galicia
- Intersection with N-601
- 133.0 km (82.6 mi) Olmedo
- 106.6 km (66.2 mi) Crossover Nava de la Asunción
- 97.1 to 94.4 km (60.3 to 58.7 mi) Tabladillo Tunnel
- 86.0 km (53.4 mi) Garcillán
- 72.5 to 70.7 km (45.0 to 43.9 mi) Puentecilla Tunnel
- Conventional Line Intersection with Villa
- 68.3 km (42.4 mi) Segovia Guiomar
- 66.2 to 37.5 km (41.1 to 23.3 mi) Guadarrama Tunnels
- 35.5 km (22.1 mi) Soto del Real
- Junction with conventional line Madrid-Burgos
- 32.9 km (20.4 mi) Arroyo Valley Viaduct
- 32.1 to 23.2 km (19.9 to 14.4 mi) tunnels of Cerro de San Pedro
- Junction with conventional line Madrid-Burgos
- 18.9 km (11.7 mi) Crossover Tres Cantos
- Junction with conventional line Madrid-Burgos
- Conventional line Madrid-Alcobendas/S.S. de los Reyes
- Fuencarral maintenance center
- Intersection with link-Hortaleza Pitis
- Intersection with link-Hortaleza Chamartin
- Link to Chamartin Iberian gauge (width changer)
- Madrid-Chamartin 0.50 km (0.31 mi)
- End of Line (AV tunnel Chamartin-Atocha)

== Key facts ==
- Inauguration: 22 December 2007 for the section Madrid–Valladolid (entry into service on the next day). 29 September 2015 for the section Valladolid–León. 29 November 2023 for the section León–Pola de Lena (entry into service on the next day).
- Approximate cost: 4,205 million euro for the section Madrid–Valladolid (about 700 M € are for the reform of the RAF of Valladolid). 1,620 million euro for the section Valladolid–León. 4,205 million euro for the section Robla–Pola de Lena.
- Tender: commissioned by the Government to GIF (today ADIF) in 1998.
- Intermediate stations: Segovia Guiomar (kilometre post 68.3), Valladolid, Venta de Baños, Palencia and León.
- At kilometre post 133.8 there is a junction for the 2021-completed Madrid–Galicia high-speed rail line, negotiable at up to 220 km/h.

== Technical details ==
- Length 179.6 km (3.7 mi) Madrid–Valladolid + 162.7 km (4.3 mi) Valladolid–León + 20.2 km (1.2 mi) León–Robla + 50 km (31 mi) Robla–Pola de Lena.
- Total length in tunnels 42,1 km (0.62 mi) + 40 km (25 mi) in the section Robla–Pola de Lena.
- Total length on viaducts 2 km (1.2 mi) + 1,8 km (5.0 mi) in the section Robla–Pola de Lena.
- UIC gauge (1,435 mm (4 ft 8 1/2 in))
- Electrification 25 kV 50 Hz AC
- Maximum speed 350 km (220 mi)/h
- Digital Signage ASFA and ERTMS II
- Platform width 16 m (52 ft)
- 5 PAET (Soto del Real, Garcillán, Olmedo, Villada and La Robla)
- 6 PB (Tres Cantos, Nava, Valdestillas, Dueñas, Las Barreras and Las Arenas)
- 7 Gauge Changers (Madrid Chamartin, Valdestillas, Valladolid, Villamuriel, Vilecha, León and Campomanes)

PB = Puesto de Banalización (Crossover)
PAET = Puesto de Adelantamiento y Estacionamiento de Trenes (overtaking loop)

== Special projects ==
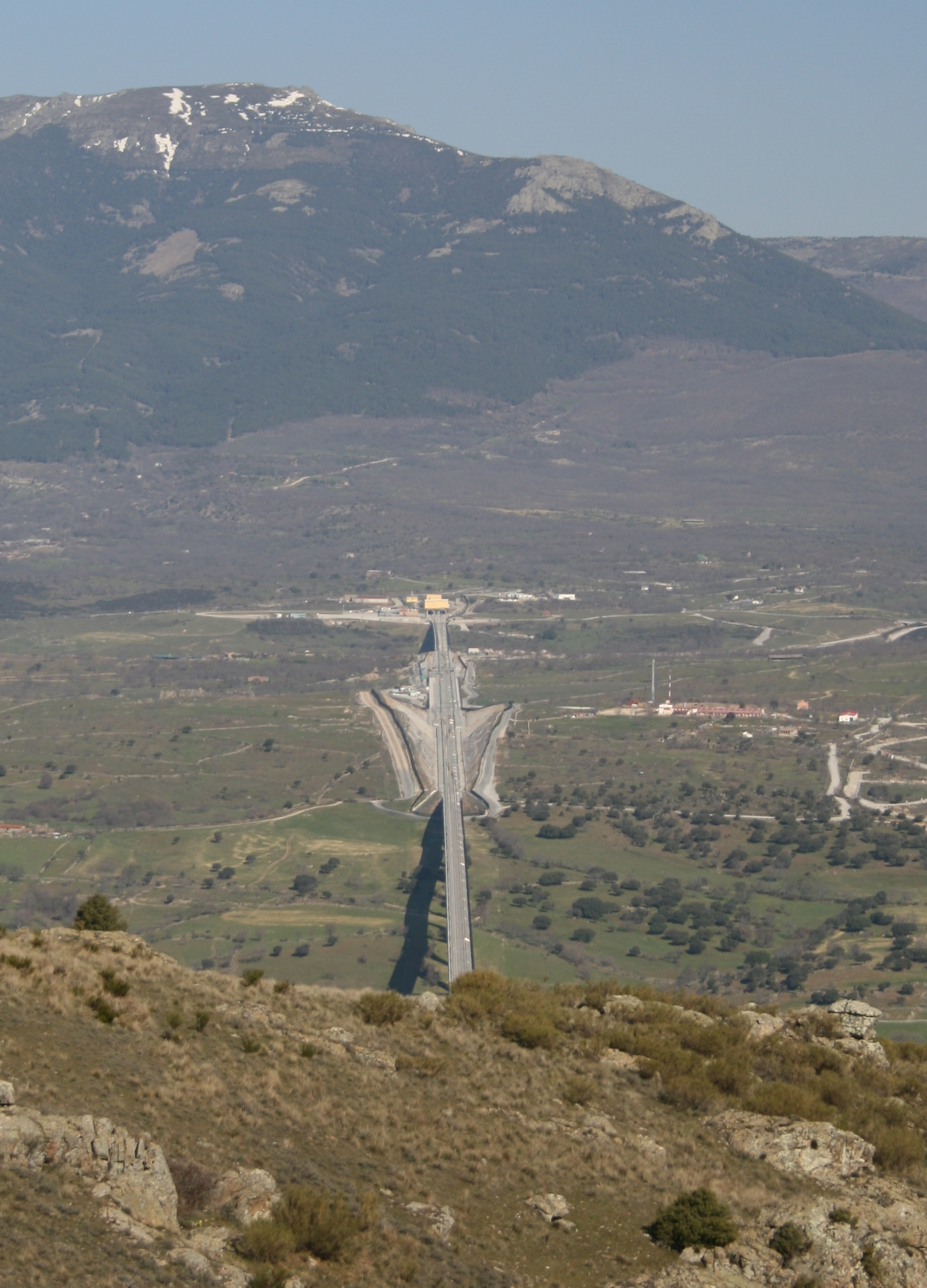
The entrance to the San Pedro tunnels

- Guadarrama Tunnel (28,377 m (93,100 ft))
- Pajares Base Tunnel (25,000 m (82,000 ft))
- Tunnels of San Pedro (8,930 m (29,300 ft))
- Arroyo Valley Viaduct (1,796 m (5,892 ft), maximum height 77.8 m (255 ft))
- Tabladillo tunnel (2 km (1.2 mi))
- Puentecilla Tunnel (1,900 m (6,200 ft))
- Tunel del Pinar de Antequera (1 km (0.62 mi)) (opening 8 November 2009)

== Reduced travel times ==
Talgo trains were replaced by Alvia trains (RENFE Class 130) and these operate on both the high-speed line and the older lines.

These trains pass through the gauge changers at Valladolid and Valdestillas or to join the General Line North from this high speed line and back by reducing their travel time by reducing the distance and increasing the commercial speed in the stretch Madrid–Valladolid.

The Talgo Madrid-Galicia was diverted later by LAV circulating until Valdestillas changer, which reverses the direction of travel and change of locomotive. In this case the time reduction has been lower, only 15-20 min, while in the Galicia-Madrid train has been an advantage to using the best line to be able to recover the backlog.

On 21 May 2024 Renfe replaced the Madrid–Gijón and Castellón/Vinaros–Gijón Alvia services by AVE services on the first AVE gauge-changing Class 106 trains, able to operate at max speed 330 km/h or 205 mph with reduced journey times by 12 minutes between Madrid and Oviedo hat covers this distance in 3 hours and 6 minutes and by 10 minutes between Madrid and Gijón which in turn covers that distance in 3 hours and 36 minutes.

| Madrid to | Previous train | Time | Distance | | Average speed | | Current train | Time | Distance | | Average speed | | Reduction |
| Madrid to | Previous train | Time | km | mi | km/h | mph | Current train | Time | km | mi | km/h | mph | Reduction |
|---|---|---|---|---|---|---|---|---|---|---|---|---|---|
| Burgos | Talgo | 3:22 | 282 | 175 | 83.76 | 52.05 | AVE | 1:33 | 301 | 187 | 194.19 | 120.66 | 1:49 |
| Gijón | Talgo | 6:15 | 591 | 367 | 94.56 | 58.76 | AVE | 3:36 | 521 | 324 | 144.72 | 89.92 | 2:39 |
| Irun | Intercity | 6:50 | 640 | 400 | 93.66 | 58.20 | Alvia | 5:38 | 570 | 350 | 101.18 | 62.87 | 1:12 |
| León | Talgo | 3:50 | 420 | 260 | 109.57 | 68.08 | AVE | 2:06 | 350 | 220 | 166.66 | 103.56 | 1:44 |
| Miranda de Ebro | Talgo | 4:26 | 371 | 231 | 83.68 | 52.00 | Intercity | 2:41 | 390 | 240 | 145.34 | 90.31 | 1:45 |
| Oviedo | Talgo | 5:43 | 559 | 347 | 97.78 | 60.76 | AVE | 3:06 | 489 | 304 | 157.74 | 98.02 | 2:37 |
| Palencia | Talgo | 2:50 | 298 | 185 | 105.18 | 65.36 | Avant | 1:20 | 228 | 142 | 171 | 106 | 1:30 |
| San Sebastian | Intercity | 6:25 | 623 | 387 | 97.09 | 60.33 | Intercity | 4:55 | 553 | 344 | 112.47 | 69.89 | 1:30 |
| Santander | Talgo | 5:35 | 515 | 320 | 92.24 | 57.32 | Alvia | 4:20 | 445 | 277 | 102.69 | 63.81 | 1:15 |
| Segovia | Regional | 2:03 | 101 | 63 | 49.27 | 30.61 | AVE | 0:25 | 68 | 42 | 163.2 | 101.4 | 1:38 |
| Valladolid | Talgo | 2:23 | 249 | 155 | 104.48 | 64.92 | AVE | 0:54 | 179 | 111 | 198.88 | 123.58 | 1:29 |
| Vitoria | Intercity | 4:39 | 493 | 306 | 106.02 | 65.88 | Intercity | 3:02 | 423 | 263 | 139.45 | 86.65 | 1:37 |

== Services that use these lines ==
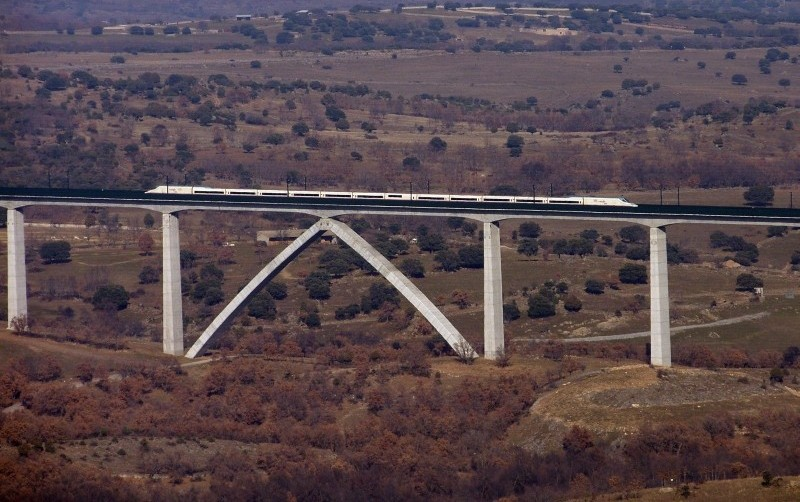
A northbound AVE-S 102 train crosses the Arroyo del Valle Viaduct soon after the line opened

- AVE Madrid-Chamartin–León via Segovia, Valladolid and Palencia on S-102.
- AVE Madrid-Chamartin–Gijón via Valladolid, Palencia, León and Oviedo on S-106.
- AVE Madrid-Chamartin–A Coruña, via Zamora, Ourense and Santiago de Compostela on S-106.
- AVE Madrid-Chamartin–Vigo, via Zamora, Sanabria, A Gudiña, Ourense, Santiago de Compostela, Vilagarcia De Arousa and Pontevedra on S-106.
- AVE Alicante–León via Albacete, Cuenca, Madrid-Chamartín, Valladolid and Palencia.
- AVE Alicante–Ourense via Albacete, Cuenca, Madrid Chamartín and Zamora.
- AVE Valencia–León via Madrid-Chamartín, Valladolid and Palencia.
- AVE Valencia–Burgos via Requena Utiel, Cuenca Fernando Zóbel, Madrid-Chamartin and Valladolid on S-112.
- AVE Gijón–Castellón via Oviedo, Mieres Del Camín, La Pola, León, Palencia, Valladolid, Segovia, Madrid-Chamartín, Cuenca, Valencia and Sagunto on S-106.
- AVE Gijón–Vinaros, via Oviedo, Mieres Del Camín, La Pola, León, Palencia, Valladolid, Segovia, Madrid-Chamartín, Cuenca, Valencia, Sagunto, Castellón, Benicàssim, Oropesa del Mar and Benicarló on S-106 (only in summertime).
- Avlo Madrid Chamartín–Gijón via Valladolid, Palencia, León, La Pola, Mieres Del Camín and Oviedo on S-106.
- Avlo Madrid-Chamartin–A Coruña, via Segovia, Medina del Campo, Zamora, Sanabria, A Gudiña, Ourense and Santiago de Compostela on S-106.
- Avlo Madrid-Chamartin–Vigo, via Segovia, Medina del Campo, Zamora, Sanabria, A Gudiña, Ourense, Santiago de Compostela and Pontevedra on S-106.
- Avlo Murcia–Valladolid via Orihuela, Elche, Alicante, Villena, Albacete, Cuenca and Madrid Chamartín on S-106.
- Avant Madrid-Chamartin–Segovia Guiomar nonstop on S121.
- Avant Madrid-Chamartin–Valladolid via Segovia Guiomar on S121.
- Alvia Madrid-Chamartin–Avilés, via Palencia, León, Mieres Del Camín and Oviedo.
- Alvia Madrid-Chamartin–Irun/Hendaye via Segovia Guiomar, Valladolid, Burgos Rosa Manzano, Miranda De Ebro, Vitoria/Gasteiz, Zumarraga and San Sebastián/Donostia on S-130
- Alvia Alicante–Gijón via Madrid-Chamartin, Valladolid, Palencia, Léon, Pola de Lena, Mieres and Oviedo on S-130.
- Alvia Madrid-Chamartin–Bilbao, via Segovia Guiomar, Valladolid, Burgos and Miranda de Ebro.
- Alvia Madrid-Chamartin–Santander, via Valladolid, Palencia, Aguilar De Campoo, Reinosa and Torrelavega on S-130.
- Alvia Alicante–Santander, via Villena, Albacete, Cuenca, Madrid, Segovia, Valladolid, Palencia and Torrelavega.
- Alvia Madrid-Chamartin–Vigo, via Segovia, Medina del Campo, Zamora, Sanabria, A Gudiña, Ourense and Pontevedra.
- Alvia Madrid-Chamartin–Lugo, via Segovia, Medina del Campo, Zamora, Sanabria, A Gudiña, Ourense, Monforte De Lemos and Sarria.
- Alvia Madrid-Chamartin–Pontevedra, via Zamora, Sanabria, A Gudiña, Ourense, Santiago de Compostela and Vilagarcia De Arousa.
  - Some schedules continue to Ferrol with additional stops in Segovia and Medina del Campo.
- Alvia Madrid-Chamartin–Santiago de Compostela, via Zamora, Sanabria, A Gudiña and Ourense.
- Alvia Madrid-Chamartin–Salamanca, via Segovia and Medina del Campo.
- IC Madrid-Chamartin–Gijón via Léon and Oviedo on S-121
- IC Madrid-Chamartin–Irun via Valladolid, Burgos, Miranda De Ebro, Vitoria, Zumarraga, Tolosa and San Sebastián
- Ouigo España Madrid-Chamartin–Valladolid via Segovia Guiomar on Euroduplex.
- Ouigo España Alicante–Valladolid via Albacete, Madrid Chamartín and Segovia on Euroduplex.

== Speed ==
The maximum permissible speed in line with ERTMS II in service are shown below. Note that trains are permitted to move at a maximum of 300 kilometres per hour (190 mph) over 147 kilometres (91 mi) of the line.

| End | | Home | | Speed | |
| km | mi | km | mi | km/h | mph |
|---|---|---|---|---|---|
| 0.800 | 0.497 | 1.402 | 0.871 | 110 | 68 |
| 1.402 | 0.871 | 1.440 | 0.895 | 35 | 22 |
| 1.440 | 0.895 | 1.884 | 1.171 | 65 | 40 |
| 1.884 | 1.171 | 6.071 | 3.772 | 110 | 68 |
| 6.071 | 3.772 | 6.513 | 4.047 | 105 | 65 |
| 6.513 | 4.047 | 8.300 | 5.157 | 110 | 68 |
| 8.300 | 5.157 | 12.400 | 7.705 | 165 | 103 |
| 12.400 | 7.705 | 14.600 | 9.072 | 200 | 120 |
| 14.600 | 9.072 | 21.000 | 13.049 | 270 | 170 |
| 21.000 | 13.049 | 168.700 | 104.825 | 300 | 190 |
| 168.700 | 104.825 | 170.358 | 105.856 | 200 | 120 |
| 170.358 | 105.856 | 171.807 | 106.756 | 180 | 110 |
| 171.807 | 106.756 | 172.600 | 107.249 | 200 | 120 |
| 172.600 | 107.249 | 173.081 | 107.548 | 160 | 99 |
| 173.081 | 107.548 | 173.091 | 107.554 | 100 | 62 |
| 173.091 | 107.554 | 177.752 | 110.450 | 160 | 99 |
| 177.752 | 110.450 | 177.827 | 110.497 | 150 | 93 |
| 177.827 | 110.497 | 178.100 | 110.666 | 160 | 99 |
| 178.100 | 110.666 | 179.300 | 111.412 | 50 | 31 |
| 179.309 | 111.417 | 179.840 | 111.747 | 40 | 25 |
| 179.840 | 111.747 | 181.241 | 112.618 | 60 | 37 |
| 181.241 | 112.618 | 182.752 | 113.557 | 120 | 75 |
| 182.752 | 113.557 | 186.621 | 115.961 | 160 | 99 |
| 186.621 | 115.961 | 217.578 | 135.197 | 200 | 120 |
| 217.578 | 135.197 | 222.651 | 138.349 | 190 | 120 |
| 222.651 | 138.349 | 223.537 | 138.899 | 150 | 93 |
| 223.537 | 138.899 | 224.605 | 139.563 | 110 | 68 |
| 224.605 | 139.563 | 230.200 | 143.040 | 80 | 50 |
| 230.200 | 143.040 | 231.398 | 143.784 | 50 | 31 |
| 231.398 | 143.784 | 232.615 | 144.540 | 80 | 50 |
| 232.615 | 144.540 | 234.349 | 145.618 | 85 | 53 |
| 234.349 | 145.618 | 235.230 | 146.165 | 125 | 78 |
| 235.230 | 146.165 | 237.946 | 147.853 | 160 | 99 |
| 237.946 | 147.853 | 338.900 | 210.583 | 200 | 120 |
| 338.900 | 210.583 | 340.673 | 211.684 | 160 | 99 |
| 340.673 | 211.684 | 343.123 | 213.207 | 130 | 81 |
| 343.123 | 213.207 | 344.086 | 213.805 | 100 | 62 |
| 344.086 | 213.805 | 344.904 | 214.313 | 60 | 37 |
| 344.904 | 214.313 | 345.450 | 214.653 | 35 | 22 |

== See also ==
- List of highest railways in Europe
