= Morales del Vino =

Morales del Vino, Spain
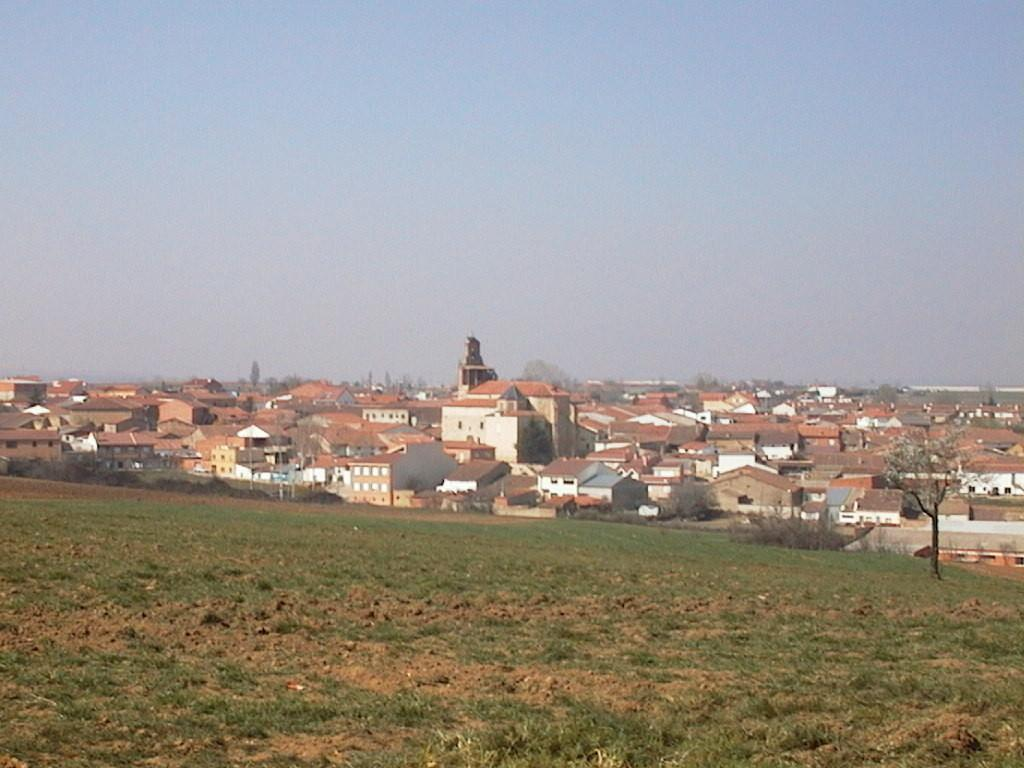

- Coat of arms

- Location within Spain Location within Europe
- Coordinates: 41°26′41″N 5°44′3″W
- Country: Spain
- Autonomous community: Castile and León
- Province: Zamora
- Municipality: Morales del Vino

Area
  - Total: 23 km^{2} (8.9 sq mi)

Population (2025-01-01)
  - Total: 3,040
  - Density: 130/km^{2} (340/sq mi)
- Time zone: UTC+1 (CET)
  - Summer (DST): UTC+2 (CEST)
- Website: Official website

Morales del Vino is a municipality located in the province of Zamora, Castile and León, Spain. According to the 2007 census (INE), the municipality has a population of 2,345 inhabitants.

== Geography and climate ==
It is located near the river Duero, 5 km South of Zamora, in the Northern Plateau (700 m above sea level) of the Iberian Peninsula. Other cities that are near Morales del Vino are Salamanca, 56 km to the South, and 100 km to Valladolid. Not too far is Portugal, 60 km.

The landscape is mainly flat, with no hills around. The village is surrounded by a continental cereal, legume and sunflower farm land, with some irrigated areas close to the river where maize, sugarbeet and sunflowers are also cropped. There are not large forests around, although some scattered trees in the fields can be found in the rainfed land or some other riverside forests are near the Duero. In the area of the municipality you can find the 'Soto de Pontejos' popular forests, with wild asparagus plants growing under the trees and among other thorny shrubs.

As the province of Zamora is located in the Northern Plateau of Spain, Morales has a Mediterranean-Continental climate. The main traits are the cold winters (-12 °C) and the hot summers (40 °C) and a long dry and sunny period around the summer only interrupted by some thunderstorms and some frequent rain in Spring and Autumn mainly. Some snow can happen in the winter but the most frequent phenomenon during winter is the fog that stays in the Duero valley producing very cold days (0 °C during the day, -5 °C during the night) with no sunshine for periods longer than one week. Apart from those days, sunshine in Morales is the predominant phenomenon.

== Etymology ==
The translation into English of the town name is 'Mulberry trees of the Wine', with no sense, but the fact that Morales is located in the Tierra del Vino (Wine Shire) gives the 'surname' of the village and the mulberry trees are not unusual in this territory. Tierra del Vino used to be known for its massive production of wine and the wide vineyards around. Decades ago vine diseases made them to nearly absolutely disappear but nowadays new agricultural techniques and the Quality Brand of the Tierra del Vino Wine have increased the amount of vineyards and the cellars that make the typically red wine from Tempranillo variety.

== Population and social information ==
Morales population was over 2400 people at the beginning of 2007, but it has quickly increased recently due to its location close to Zamora, the capital of the province, and the good communication of the N-630 Ruta de la Plata road, that crosses the West of Spain, from Asturias to Andalucía. The roadworks that will end up with a new motorway, the A-66, are about to finish.

There are many new buildings in Morales del Vino due to the new population living there, and there are many new businesses and services in the village nowadays. Some of the new houses in the town are apartments but most of them are cottages or single houses with their own swimming pool and gardens. You can find in the town centre some shops and supermarkets, several bank branches, a petrol station, a chemist shop, several bars, press and lottery, fast food and some restaurants.

The main economic resource of Morales used to be farming, either cattle, sheep, pig or grassland farming. Nowadays, the village is bigger due to the people from Zamora who live in it because of the environment, the lower property values, and the commodities available in Morales. There are many people employed now in bars, industry, offices and other services, but even now one finds a rural landscape around the village.

Many areas of Northwest Spain are famous for the food. Morales del Vino is placed within some quality of origin demarcation for food, as the Zamorano Cheese, Zamorano Chorizo and Tierra del Vino Wine. Cheese and wine are the most representative products from these region and Morales holds two high quality cheese factories that can be visited. These factories produce cheese from the local sheep and cow milk.

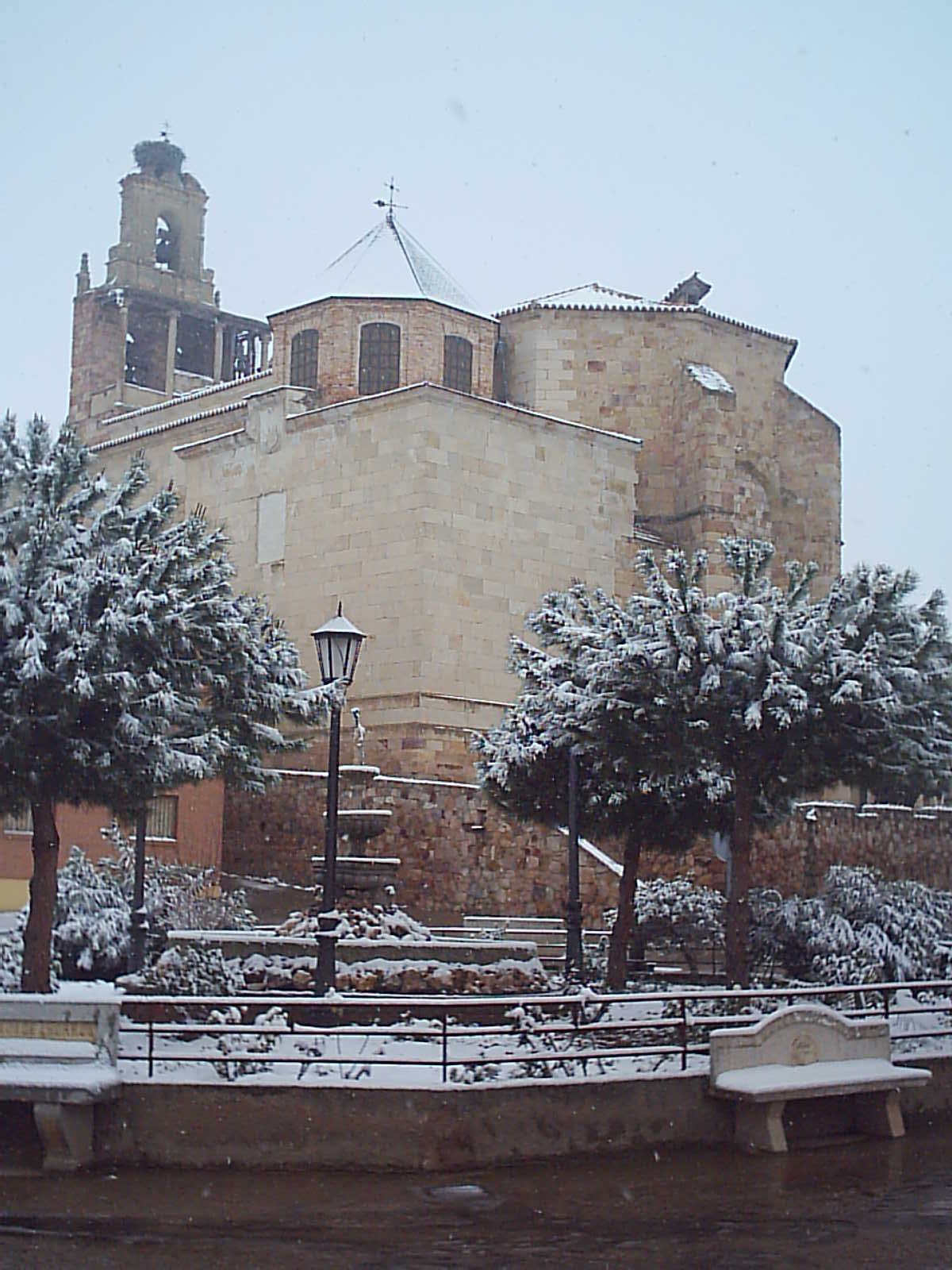

== History, monuments and visitor attractions ==
The town was founded in the Middle Ages, when the church was built after the Christians recovered the land from the Moors, who stayed here several centuries, but no ruins are left now of their culture. The church has Gothic and Renaissance art style sculpture and building elements; especially noteworthy are the main chapter and the north entrance, with an unusual style for this area. It holds a magnificent baroque organ that scarcely played in religious celebrations that it is worth to listen.

There is also a little church on the road to Zamora, called El Cristo, where every May the 9th, the people from Morales, Zamora and other surrounding areas celebrate the Morales del Vino main festivity, El Cristo de Morales, a typical "romería".

Morales has many old houses built next to each other, with the main façade on the street and a backyard used typically to grow a little kitchen garden and some hens, pigs or rabbits. A typical old style house might also have several stables to keep the donkeys, mules or horses used in those days to plow the soil or as the only transport means. Nowadays some of these old houses have been restored and they are considered to be luxury mansions. Many of them also have a cave several meters underneath them, where wine was fermented and aged. The old town of Morales is mined with many caves, some of which are beautifully restored as party lounges now. If the visitor get the chance to visit the Town Hall, which was a big house transformed decades ago to the town school (in the 1940s) made on the typical sandstone used in the old style buildings, it would be worth to ask someone in the offices to access to the Town Hall Cave. It is now used only in a few celebrations.

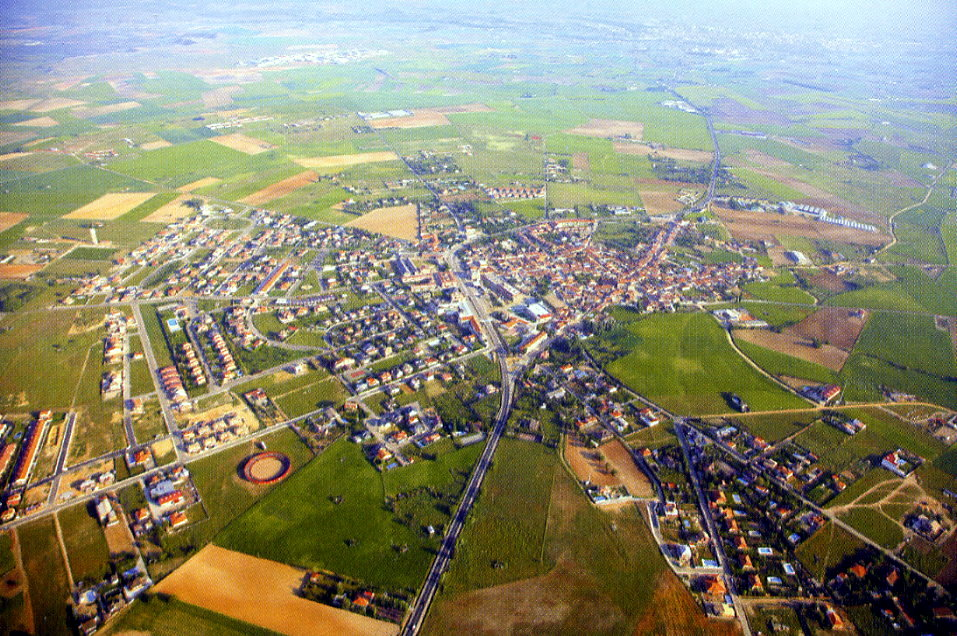

There are several ways to reach Morales del Vino; the main way is the road N-630 (Km 285), but there is also a nearby train station in Zamora, with routes to Galicia, Madrid and Valladolid. The closest airports are in Valladolid, Salamanca, Bragança and León, but also Madrid is not too far (250 km).
