= Estadio El Bayu =

Football stadium in Spain

El Bayu
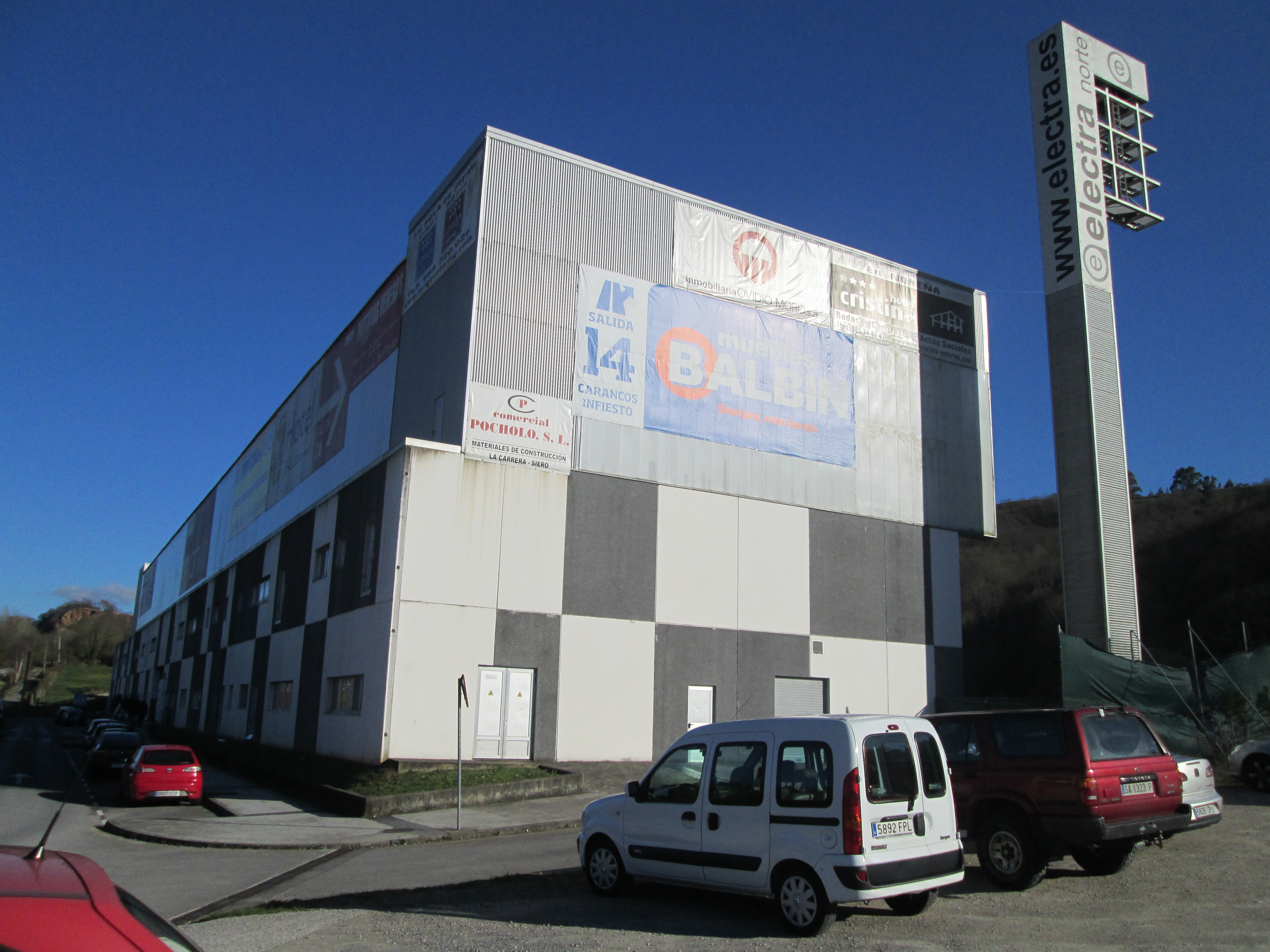
- Interactive map of El Bayu
- Location: Pola de Siero, Siero, Asturias, Spain
- Coordinates: 43°23′4″N 5°39′36.8″W
- Owner: Municipality of Siero
- Operator: Club Siero
- Capacity: 4,500
- Surface: Artificial turf
- Field size: 105 × 68

Construction
- Opened: 31 October 2006

Tenant
- Club Siero (2006–present)

Estadio El Bayu is a football stadium in Pola de Siero, Siero, and is the home of Club Siero.

== History ==
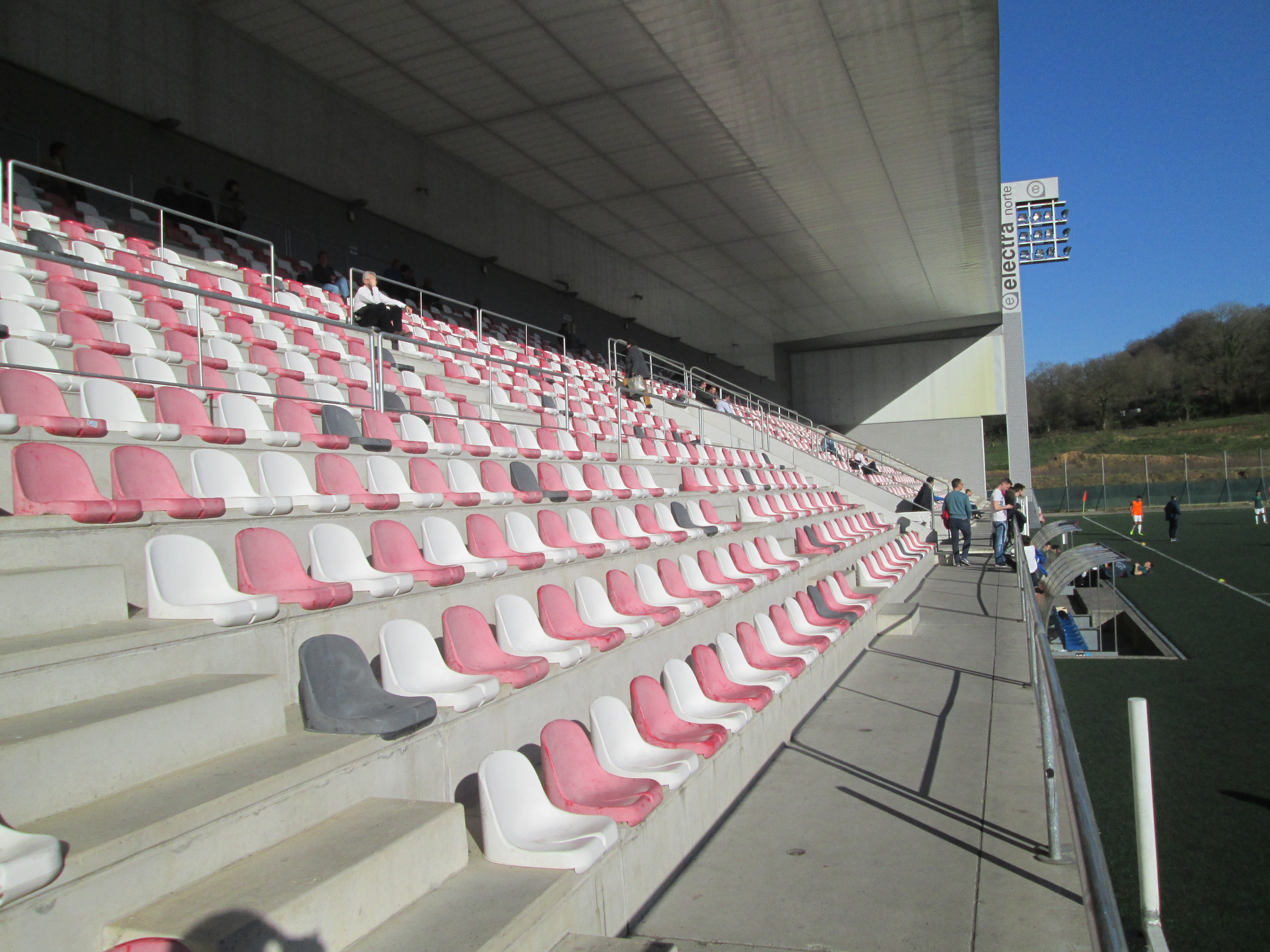
Main tribune of the stadium.

The stadium was built in 2006 after the demolition of Estadio Luis Miranda, the old stadium in the village, for building the A-64 highway.

It was inaugurated on 31 October 2006 with a friendly football game between the Spain women's national team and a team composed by Spanish players.

The stadium has only one stand with capacity for 4,500 spectators and it is currently used by all the teams of the four clubs located at Pola de Siero.
