= Pajares Base Tunnel =

Railway tunnel in Spain

Coordinates: 43°01′10″N 5°46′31″W

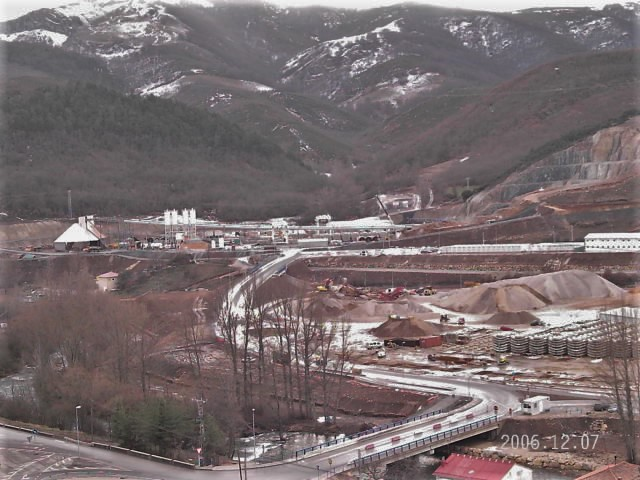
The construction site in 2006

The Pajares Base Tunnel is a twin pair of railway tunnels beneath the Puerto de Pajares pass in the Cantabrian Mountains, Spain. The 24,667 m (80,928 ft) length tunnel forms a key portion of the high-speed rail line between León and Gijón, and can be used by both high speed passenger trains as well as by slower freight trains.

Work commenced on the Pajares Base Tunnel following its authorisation in 2003. During the construction process, multiple setbacks were incurred on the part of the geological conditions present, particularly the copious ingress of water into the tunnels. Despite multiple years of remedial work and the deployment of unique engineering solutions, the infiltration issue has proved to be difficult to address, and questions have arisen as to if its electrification is even practical. As a result, the fitting-out of the tunnel has been delayed by several years. Early on, the through route was expected to be open in 2010. Finally, the tunnels were opened to passenger traffic 30 November 2023.

== Construction ==
During the early decades of the 21st century, Spain allocated a large proportion of European Union-supplied infrastructure funding into the expansion of its AVE high speed rail network. On 1 March 2002, it was announced that Gestor de Infraestructuras Ferroviarias (GIF) had awarded a €5·18m contract to Ineco and Geoconsult for the design of a new 50 km high speed railway between La Robla and Pola de Lena, forming a part of the main line between Madrid - Oviedo main line. The most prominent civil engineering work of this line is the twin-bore Pajares Base Tunnel, which necessitated a length of 24,667 m (80,928 ft) to traverse the Pajares pass of the Cantabrian Mountains. It was reportedly regarded as being one of the largest and most challenging civil engineering projects anywhere in Europe at that time. The tunnel would replace a relatively steep and winding conventional route through the mountains that had limited train speeds to a maximum speed of 70 kmph, while the new line was envisioned to facilitate speeds of up to 300 kmph.

During 2003, the Public Works Ministry awarded a €1.8 billion contract for the Pajares Base Tunnel's construction to a consortium involving the majority of Spain’s major civil engineering firms, including FCC, Acciona, Dragados, Ferrovial, Sacyr, and Constructora Hispánica. As originally planned, both bores of the Pajares Base Tunnel would have been furnished only with standard gauge high-speed rail; however, mid-way through construction, it was decided that a dual gauge arrangement would be installed instead, as it was thought that the presence of Iberian gauge would make the tunnel particularly useful to freight trains as well. It had been anticipated that the completed tunnel would facilitate a journey time of 2 hours and 12 minutes between Madrid and Oviedo by 2010.

Its execution began with five TBMs (four for the large tubes and the fifth for the gallery from Buiza) between July and September 2005 on the León slope and between April and July 2006 on the Asturian slope. The tunnel boring machines extracted 4,300,000 m^{3} (5,600,000 cu yd) from the tunnels. The bulk of the excavation work for the Pajares Base Tunnel was performed by tunnel boring machines (TBMs). The construction soon encountered substantial amounts of underground water, the presence of relatively porous karst in the vicinity of the bores had been previously identified by surveys undertaken in the 1980s; accordingly, vast quantities of water continuously infiltrated into the bores. It has been alleged by construction workers that management had prioritised maintaining a high rate of progress over properly sealing the tunnel against water infiltration. Furthermore, the geological conditions surrounding the tunnel featured multiple areas of high compressive tectonic stress regimes, such as thrust faults, which necessitated greater levels of support to be installed in the tunnel than had been originally anticipated. Despite this, the boring process was completed eight months ahead of schedule. On 11 July 2009, a ceremony was held to mark the completion of the tunnels.

However, despite this milestone being attained, the fitting-out of the tunnel proceeded at a very slow rate due to the water infiltration issue; up to 2,200 litres per second (78 cu ft/s) of water was reportedly entering the tunnel, much of it via cracks in its concrete walls. Conventional waterproofing measures, such as polymeric paste injection and polymeric membranes, proved insufficient, while additional excavation was prohibitively expensive due to the walls being largely complete already. Instead, engineers turned to unorthodox means of channeling the water by installing a first-of-its-kind composite lining. After four years of work, the rate of water infiltration had been reduced by 40 percent. By 2014, the difficulties of constructing the Pajares Base Tunnel had become thoroughly apparent. Over the course of one decade, the initial plans of the tunnel were altered on 15 occasions. The costs of its construction has overrun substantially, rising to €3 billion against the originally budgeted price of €1.8 billion.

During June 2020, it was announced that Administrador de Infraestructuras Ferroviarias (ADIF) had awarded a €53m contract to a consortium of Alstom, Indra and the San José Construction Group to supply tunnel safety and security systems for the 12 tunnels of the Pajares New Line project, including the Pajares Base Tunnel. Despite plans for the tunnel to be electrified by 25 kV AC throughout its 24,667 m (80,928 ft) length, questions have been raised if electrification is feasible due to the high level of water infiltration present.

== See also ==
- León-Gijón railway line
