= Guadarrama Tunnel =

Largest rail underpass in Spain

Coordinates: 40.7788°N 03.7677°W

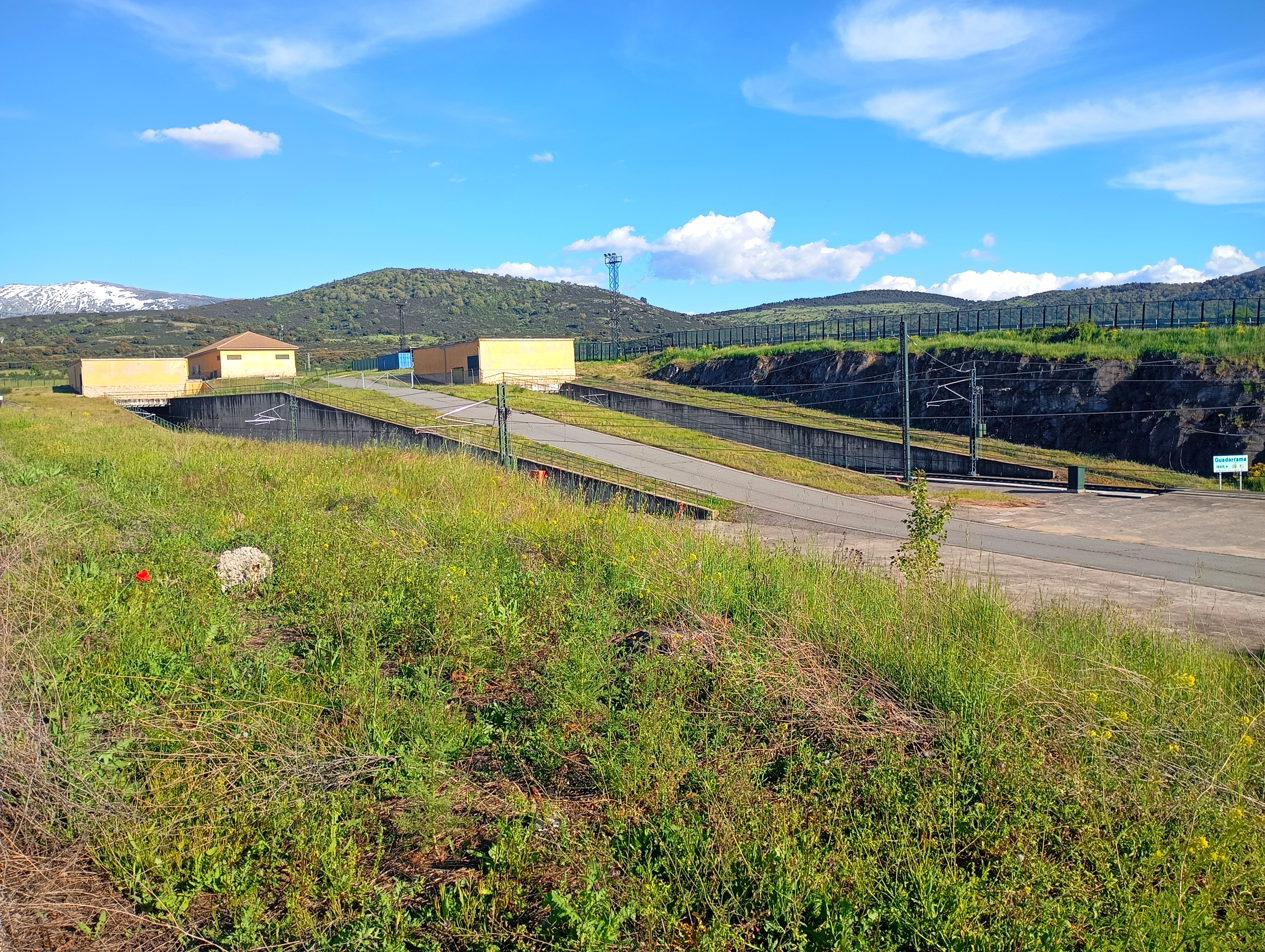
- Entrance to the tunnel from the northwest mouth, in the province of Segovia
- Interactive map of Guadarrama Tunnel

Overview
- Line: Madrid–Asturias high-speed rail line

Operation
- Work began: September 2002
- Opened: 2007
- Operator: Administrador de Infraestructuras Ferroviarias
- Traffic: Train
- Character: High speed passenger

Technical
- Length: 28.4 km (17.6 mi)
- No. of tracks: 2
- Track gauge: 1,435 mm (4 ft 8 1/2 in)
- Electrified: Overhead catenary 25 kV AC 50 Hz

The Guadarrama Tunnel is a railway tunnel across the Sierra de Guadarrama, forming a key portion of the Madrid–Asturias high-speed rail line in Spain. It is the largest tunnel in Spain, as well as being the fifth largest in the world at the time of its completion.

The tunnel comprises two individual parallel tubes, with regular interconnecting galleries throughout their length. The western tube is 28,407 m long and the eastern tube 28,418 m long, and it is the longest tunnel in Spain (when not counting the Line 12 tunnel in the Madrid Metro). The tunnel was opened for traffic in December 2007, and has been primarily used by the AVE high speed passenger trains.

== Construction ==
The Guadarrama Tunnel was designed as the most substantial civil engineering work of the wider Madrid–Asturias high-speed rail line, facilitating the movement of trains between the capital and the major cities of the north and north-western portions of Spain at speeds of up to 350 km/h (220 mph). The route selected for the tunnel, which runs between the municipalities of Miraflores de la Sierra and Segovia, overlapped with the protected area of the Guadarrama massif. At the time of its construction, during the first decade of the twenty first century, the Guadarrama Tunnel was described by Administrador de Infraestructuras Ferroviarias (ADIF) as being the largest civil engineering project in Spain.

It comprises a pair of separate bores that ran parallel to one another at a distance of 30 meters (98 feet) from the centerline of one another. Each bore possessed an internal diameter of 8.50 m (27.9 ft) and featured numerous cross passages at 250-meter (820-foot) intervals throughout its length, which are intended for use during emergencies. The geology surrounding the bores was largely composed of igneous and metamorphic rocks, such as gneiss and granite; the tectonic properties of these rock formations posed considerable structural challenges to the project. Further complications were posed by the stipulation that the construction methods used would result in the minimum possible environmental impact.

On 28 September 2002, construction of the Guadarrama Tunnel formally commenced. The approach selected for the excavation phase was via four "double shield" tunnel boring machines (TBMs), the design of which was specially adapted to suit the local geology. As a means of minimise environmental impact, there was no use of intermediate stages during the construction process, which was a rare option for a high speed tunnel of such length. The ground proved to be relatively consistent, particularly in terms of hardness, throughout the boring process, which typically advanced at a rate of 16 meters per day. The tunnel was lined with prefabricated cement voissoirs, ring-shaped supports, that was manufactured used some the excavated material onsite.

On 5 May 2005, breakthrough in the eastern bore was achieved, with the occasion marked by an inauguration ceremony presided over the Minister of Public Works Magdalena Alvarez. One month later, breakthrough occurred in the western bore as well. Following these milestones, the fitting-out of the tunnels commenced, which included the installation of railway infrastructure and supporting systems. Safety features included an onsite control center to monitor system performance and environmental conditions, a dedicated emergency room in the center of the tunnel with space for 1,200 people, fire suppression systems, along with various other measures. Ballastless track was installed throughout, along with overhead electrification, signalling, communication systems, while power was provided via an arrangement of 11 transformers at 2,250 meter intervals.
