= Puerto de Pajares =

Pajares Pass
- Puerto de Pajares
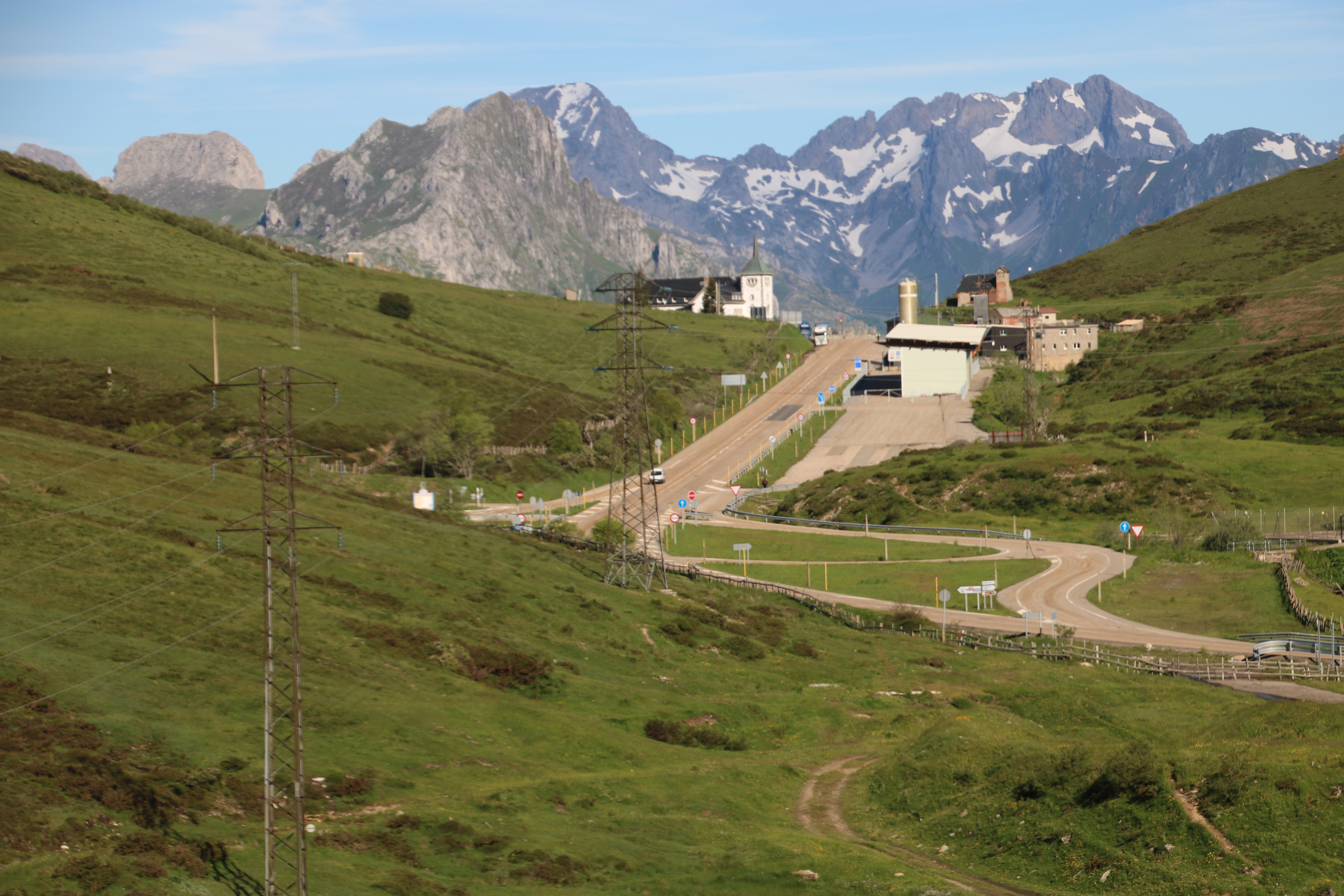
- View of the N-630 crossing Puerto de Pajares from the east, with Ubiña Massif in the background

- Location within Spain
- Elevation: 1,378 metres (4,521 ft)

Third Approach
- Location: Villamanín, León and Lena, Asturias
- Range: Cantabrian Mountains
- Coordinates: 42°59′34″N 5°45′34″W

The Puerto de Pajares is a mountain pass through the Cantabrian Mountains between the provinces of Asturias and Léon, Spain. The pass has been historically important to Asturias as the lowest elevation direct route between the capital, Oviedo, and the rest of inland Spain via Léon. The pass delineated, for a time, the frontier between the Christian Kingdom of Asturias and the Moorish extent of the Umayyad Caliphate.

Today, the pass is crossed by the N-630 highway which links Oviedo and Léon, in addition to the Venta de Baños–Gijón railway which passes through a series of high elevation tunnels near the summit of the pass. The importance of the pass has diminished in recent years as the N-630 highway has been supplanted by the A-66 freeway which bypasses Puerto de Pajares through the Negrón Tunnel since 1997, 6 km (3.7 mi) to the west. In addition, a 25 km (16 mi) long railway tunnel bypassing the pass, the Pajares Base Tunnel, was opened in November 2023 as part of the León-Asturias High Speed Line, after 18 years of construction and several delays due to leakage issues.

There is a restaurant located at the summit of the pass offering views in both directions. The Valgrande-Pajares ski resort is located near the pass.

The Tour of Spain has passed over Puerto de Pajares 18 times.

== See also ==
- Pajares Ramp
