= Negrón Tunnel =

Road tunnel in Spain

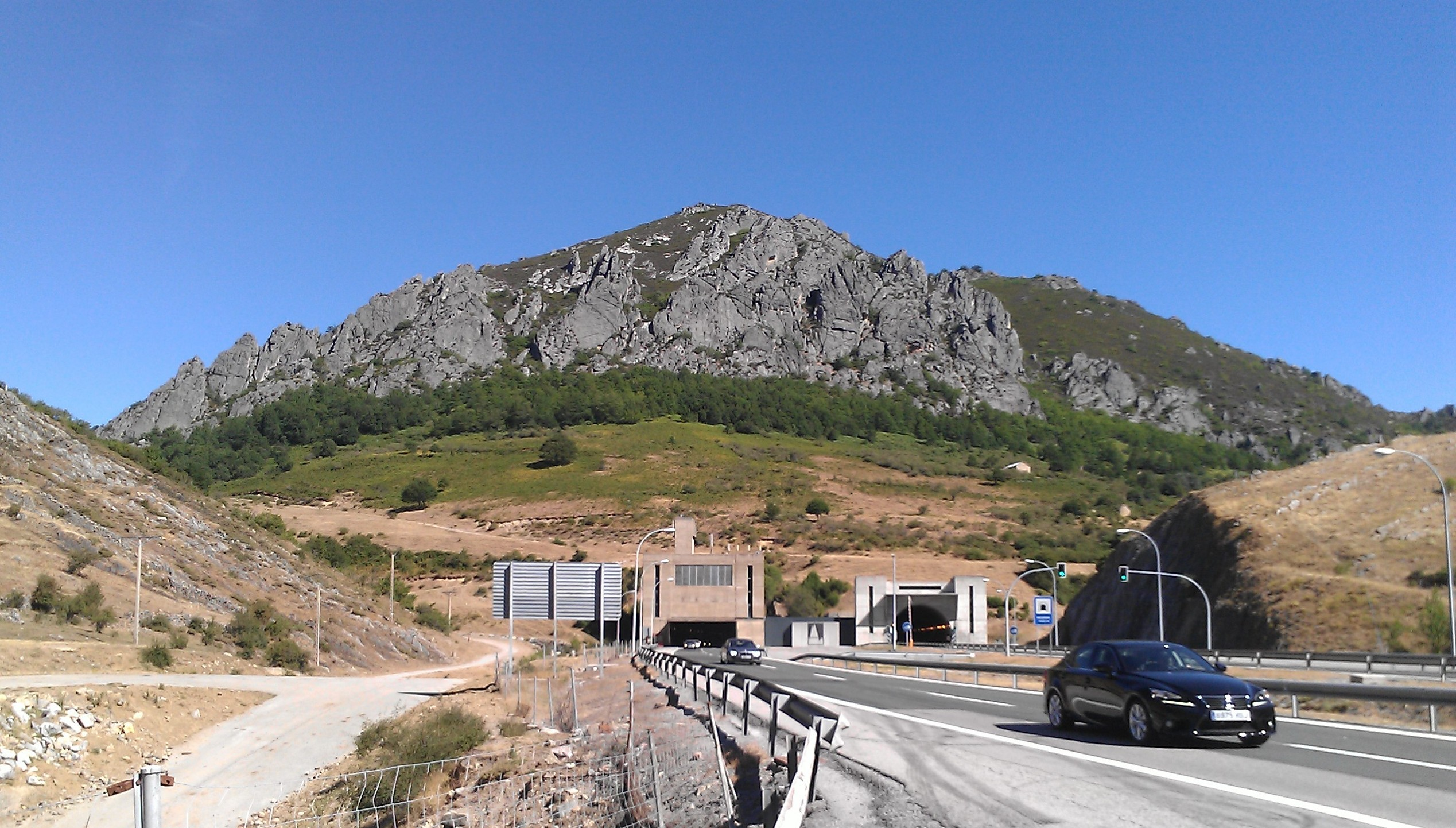
- Entrance to Negrón tunnel from León
- Interactive map of Negrón Tunnel

Overview
- Location: Asturias and León
- Coordinates: 42°57′37″N 5°50′17″W
- Route: AP-66, as part of A-66
- Start: Lena
- End: Sena de Luna

Operation
- Work began: June 1976
- Opened: June 1997
- Operator: Aucalsa
- Traffic: Automotive
- Toll: €13.05

Technical
- Length: 4,144 metres (13,596 ft)
- Max elevation: 1,229 metres (4,032 ft)

The Negrón Tunnel (Spanish: Túnel del Negrón) is an automotive tunnel which connects the provinces of Asturias and León in Northern Spain. The tunnel is 4,144 metres (13,596 ft) long and reaches a height of 1,229 metres (4,032 ft).

The tunnel is in the toll highway AP-66, which is part of the Autovía A-66, one of the longest highways in Spain. The tunnel provides an alternate route to the Puerto de Pajares, a mountain pass that is considered dangerous for motorists.

== History ==
Initially, the first roadway was planned with a cost of 19.5 million pesetas, but it rose to 70 million due to several unexpected problems in the terrain. This one was started in 1976 and gave work to 1,300 people during several years. The first of the two projected tunnels was opened in 1983 and worked provisionally as a single carriageway road.

Works ended in 1997, with the opening of the second roadway in June 1997, which had 4,144 metres (13,596 ft) length and costed 7.443m pesetas.

Since its opening, the AP-66 is the main connection between Asturias and León.
