= Pajares Ramp =

Historic mountain railway pass in northern Spain crossing the Cantabrian Mountains

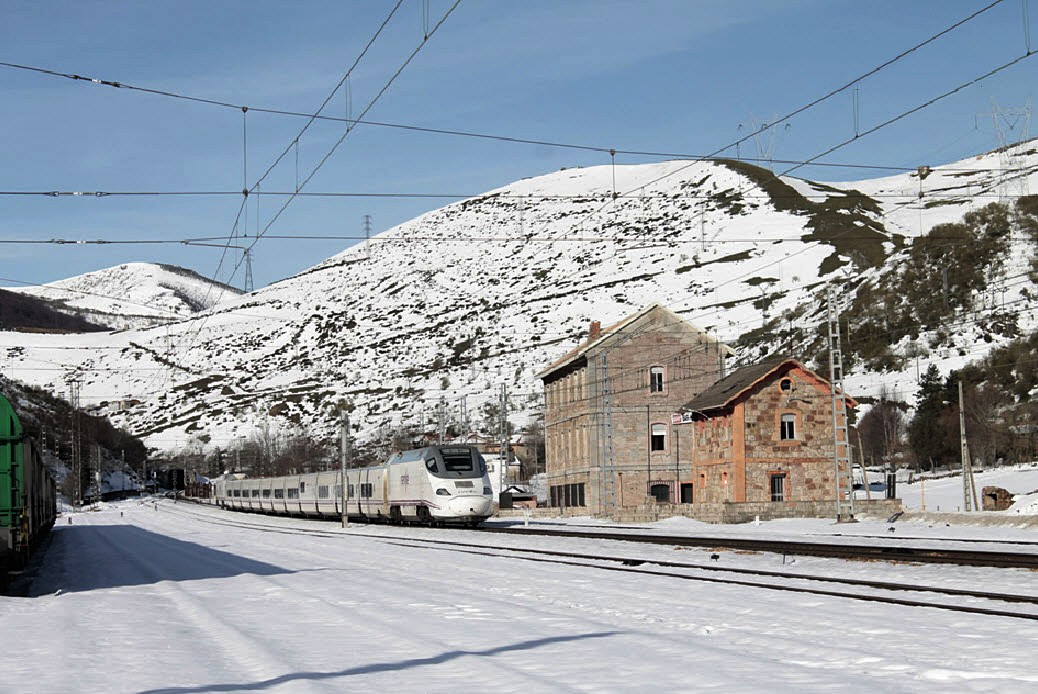
- An S-130 operating an Alvia service through Busdongo station

Overview
- Native name: Rampa (o bajada) de Pajares
- Status: Operational (planned closure after opening of Pajares Bypass)
- Owner: ADIF
- Locale: León and Asturias, Spain

Service
- Operator: Renfe Operadora

History
- Opened: 1884

Technical
- Line length: 42.7 km (26.5 mi)
- Number of tracks: 1
- Character: Mountain railway
- Track gauge: 1,668 mm (5 ft 5 21/32 in)
- Electrification: 3,000 V DC overhead line (since 1924)
- Operating speed: 105 km/h (65 mph) (maximum)
Route map
Rampa_de_Pajares.svg

The Pajares Ramp (Spanish: rampa de Pajares), also known as the Pajares Descent (Spanish: bajada de Pajares), is a section of the railway line between León and Gijón in Spain. It allows trains to cross the Cantabrian Mountains via the Puerto de Pajares to connect Castilla y León with Asturias.

The final section was built between 1880 and 1884 and is considered one of the major engineering projects of the 19th century in Spain. According to Trevor Rowe, a railway enthusiast and railway photographer from Great Britain, the railway line via Pajares was, in 1970, one of the most difficult mountain passes in Europe.

Since 2017, a platform has been advocating for the recognition of the Pajares Ramp as a World Heritage Site.

The Variante de Pajares (Pajares Bypass), under construction since 2005, will provide a new high-speed rail access to Asturias when completed. It is planned that the historic Pajares Ramp will then be permanently closed due to the high cost of its maintenance. A preservation group has also met with Talgo to defend a proposal aimed at making the line a future test bench for its trains.

== Route ==
According to Hacar and González, for the general public, the Pajares Ramp runs from Puente de los Fierros station (in Asturias) to the south portal of the La Perruca Tunnel (on the side of the province of León). However, for people linked to railway infrastructure in northwestern Spain—particularly on the León–Gijón line—the ramp on the Asturian side extends as far as the old station of La Cobertoria, an additional 9 km (5.6 mi) further. This additional section has a continuous gradient of about 20%.

== Characteristics ==
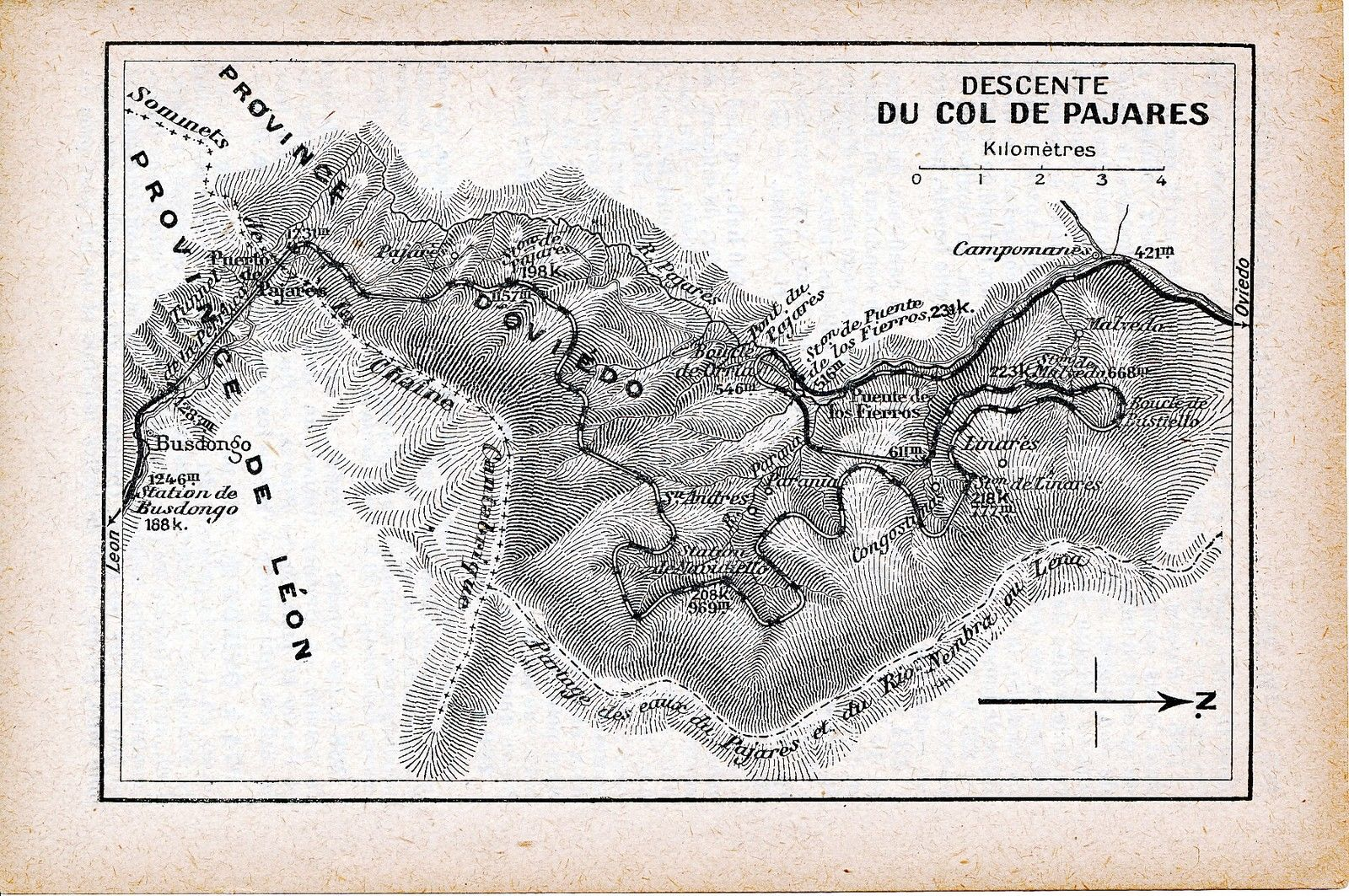
Map of the Pajares Pass descent from a 1915 French travel guide

=== General characteristics ===
In the direction of Gijón, the line goes up from Busdongo station at 1,230 m (4,040 ft) to the south portal of La Perruca Tunnel at 1,270 m (4,170 ft), which is the highest point on the route. This tunnel crosses the border between León province and Asturias. It then descends to 927 m (3,041 ft) at La Cobertoria station (in the municipality of Lena), with an almost constant gradient of 20‰ over 49 km (30 mi). Up to Pola de Lena railway station, 44% of the alignment is curved, generally with a radius of 300 m (980 ft).

The construction of the ramp required boring 61 tunnels and building 156 bridges and viaducts of all sizes. The Parana viaduct near Puente de los Fierros station was notable for its length; built in iron with three curved spans totalling 130 m (430 ft), it was later replaced by an embankment.

=== Tunnels ===
From Busdongo to Puente de los Fierros the section consists of a succession of 63 tunnels. At opening there were 61 tunnels totalling 25 km (16 mi) of underground line out of 42 km (26 mi) total—about 60%. Six exceed 1,000 m (3,300 ft): La Perruca (3,072 m (10,079 ft)), La Pisona (1,050 m (3,440 ft)), La Sorda (1,076 m (3,530 ft)), Congostinas (1,170 m (3,840 ft)), El Capricho (1,838 m (6,030 ft)), and Orria (1,057 m (3,468 ft)).

La Perruca tunnel (between Villamanín in León and Lena in Asturias) is straight and was inaugurated on 15 August 1884. It was hand-driven using compressed-air drills similar to those used on the Gotthard railway tunnel. Excavation was carried out from both portals and three intermediate shafts. At the end of its construction, it was the longest tunnel built in Spain.

Since 1884, several artificial tunnels (snow sheds) have been built to protect the railway from avalanches in the most exposed areas.

=== Stations ===
Between Busdongo and Puente de los Fierros four intermediate stations were built to allow train crossings. These stations were also equipped with water cranes for the refueling of steam locomotives.

In the León → Gijón direction they are:

- Pajares (km 62.7)
- Navidiello-Parana (km 72.2)
- Linares-Congostinas (km 82.3)
- Malvedo (km 88.0)

=== Technical characteristics ===
According to ADIF's 2013 Network Statement, the Pajares Ramp forms part of line 130 (Venta de Baños–Gijón). It is single-track and electrified at 3 kV DC with non-compensated catenary. As regards signalling and safety systems, the section has been equipped with an automatic block with centralised traffic control (CTC) since 1967 plus train-ground radiotelephony and ASFA (Automatic Brake and Signal Announcement). The ruling gradient is 23‰ uphill and 22‰ downhill; maximum speed is 105 km/h (65 mph)

== History ==
=== Project origins ===
The Busdongo–Ujo section was the last part of the León–Gijón railway to be completed. Originally awarded to the Compañía del Noroeste de España, the concession was rescinded by the Spanish government on 8 February 1878 due to the company's financial difficulties (similar action was taken on León–Ponferrada and Ponferrada–A Coruña). (Note: See also: Real decreto rescindiendo la concesión de las líneas férreas de Palencia á Ponferrada, de Ponferrada á la Coruña y de León á Gijón. Gaceta de Madrid no. 42, 11 February 1878, p. 349. Ministry of Development)

At that point, only the sections of the line linking Pola de Lena to Puente de los Fierros, undertaken directly by the Spanish government, and Busdongo to Puente de los Fierros remained to be built to complete the León–Gijón railway line. The government withdrew the concessions previously granted to the Compañía del Noroeste de España and to the Oviedo–Trubia line, a branch of the León–Gijón line.

On 4 February 1880 the government awarded the concessions to the French group las Sociedades de París reunidas, represented by banker Armand Donon. (Note: The winning group included the Société des dépôts et comptes courants, Société générale de crédit industriel et commercial, Société Financière de Paris, and Compañía de los Caminos de Hierro del Norte de España) They formed the Compañía de los Ferrocarriles de Asturias, Galicia y León (AGL) and transferred the concessions (approved by royal order of 31 March 1880). (Note: Arrêté royal (rectifié) acceptant le transfert des lignes du nord-ouest réalisé par les compagnies concessionnaires en faveur de la nouvelle compagnie AGL. Gaceta de Madrid no. 96, 5 April 1880, pp. 34–35.)

Soon afterwards (27 April 1880) the mayor of Lena warned other Asturian municipalities that AGL was studying a route change via Pajares with steeper gradients and tighter curves. The deputy Rafael María d'Ouvre, originally from Asturias, presented on 19 May a letter of protest in front of the Cortes against the plans of the company of Donón. The letter, dated 12, was signed by seven Asturian newspapers, namely Revista de Asturias, La Opinión, La Luz de Avilés, El Carbayón, El Comercio, El Boletín de la Liga and El Naranco, and said to do so on behalf of the Asturian press.

The Oviedo press called a meeting in the city on Sunday, 27 June, to protest against this change. More than two thousand people attended, including Leopoldo Alas, who voiced support for the proposals read out by the journalist César Argüelles, including that of not voting for Asturian deputies who did not oppose the modification of the route.

On 28 February 1881, Revista de Asturias reported that the AGL intended to propose to the government a reduction of the original route from 37 to just 23 kilometres, increasing the gradient from 20‰ to 35‰ in order to reduce costs.

PASO DEL PAJARES

"Tenemos el sentimiento de anunciar á nuestros lectores que la Compañía de los ferro-carriles de Asturias, Galicia y León, tiene resuelto proponer al Gobierno la variación del trazado de la bajada del Pajares adoptando la pendiente del tres y medio por ciento."

Revista de Asturias, no. 4, p. 1.

Translation: PAJARES PASS: "It is with regret that we inform our readers that the Asturias, Galicia and León Railway Company has decided to propose to the government a modification of the layout of the Pajares descent, adopting a gradient of three and a half percent".

This proposal was supported by the report Notes on the Pajares Descent, published in Paris in January 1881. It was written by the engineers Paul Eugène Bontoux and Paulo Amilhau, directors of the Austrian State Railway Company and the Società per le Ferrovie dell’Alta Italia, respectively, with the support of other engineers. In exchange for modifying the alignment of the railway line, the company was prepared to provide economic support for the development of the port of Gijón. The AGL formally set out its intentions by officially requesting the change of route on 4 March.

Leading figures in Asturian society called for a demonstration in Oviedo to protest against the company's plans, which they considered counterproductive to regional industry. The event took place in Oviedo's Plaza de la Escandalera on 27 March 1881.

By royal decree of 15 June, "the request of the Asturias, Galicia and León Railway Company, seeking to modify the approved project with gradients of twenty per thousand for the descent of the Pajares Pass on the León–Gijón line, and to accept gradients of thirty-five per thousand for that alignment, is rejected", in accordance with the opinion of the Junta Consultiva de Caminos, Canales y Puertos. Likewise, the rack railway option and the possibility of further studies by the AGL to modify the route were also rejected.

== Construction ==
=== General progress ===
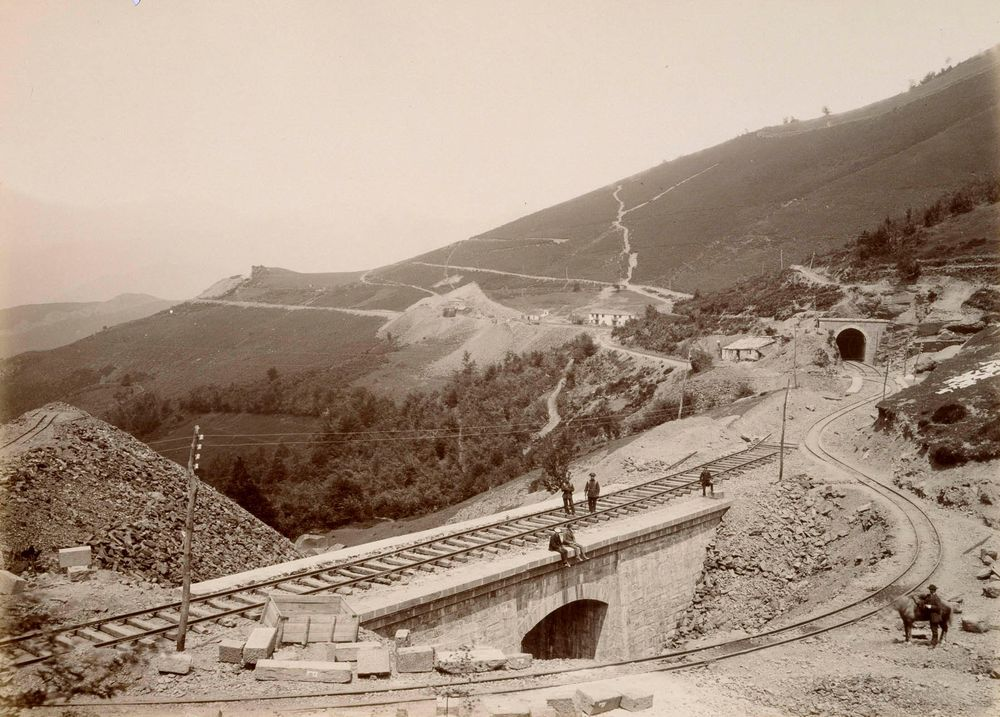
The Entrambosríos bridge, located between the Canto de la Laguna and El Bescón tunnels. In the foreground is the additional track built for work on the 1st and 2nd sections.

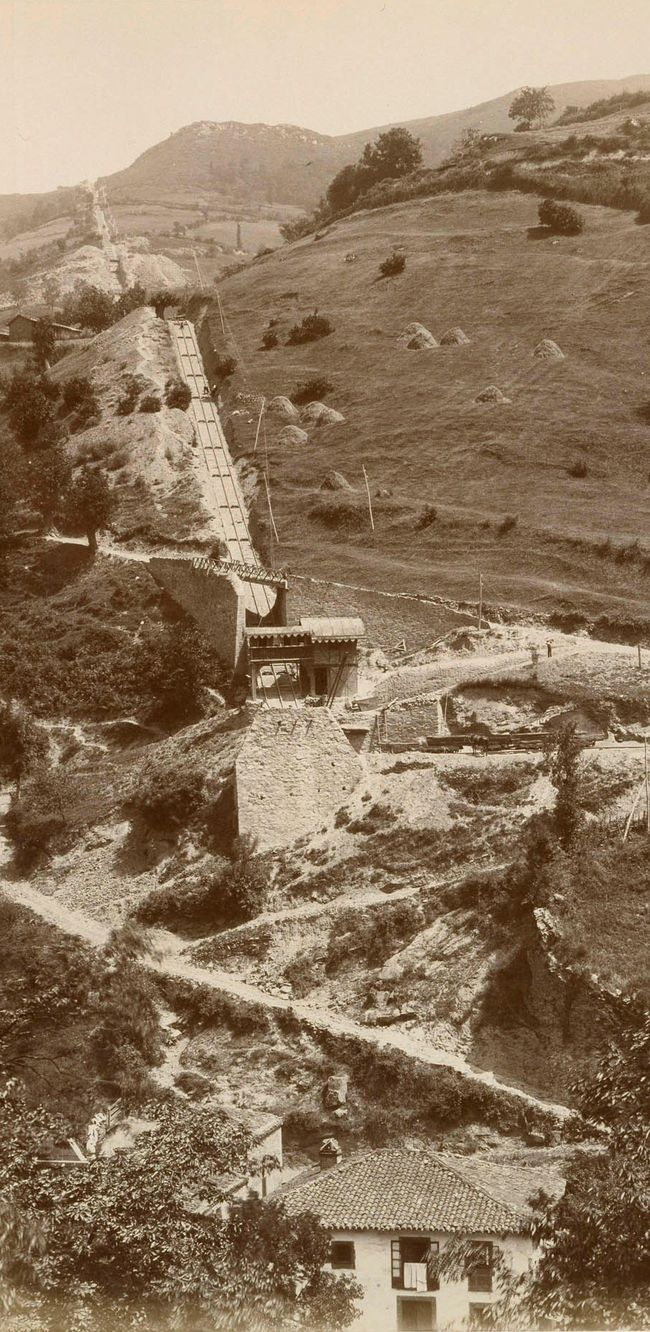
Photograph by Paul Sauvanaud (c. 1884) showing the inclined plane of the 3rd and 4th sections. At the bottom of the image is the presbytery house and, to the left, the church of San Martín de Las Puentes.

For the construction of the ramp between Puente de los Fierros and Busdongo, the section was divided into five parts. The first, where work began, included the Perruca Tunnel and its surroundings, between Busdongo station and the Las Piedras valley, along with three shorter tunnels: Maja del Estudiante, La Calera, and Loma del Asno.

The remaining four sections, known as the “Pajares descent,” are numbered from one to four from the Las Piedras valley to Puente de los Fierros station and were assigned in pairs: the first and second to Francisco Buergo and Salustiano Regueral, and the third and fourth to engineer Eduardo Calleja, who designed the route for the entire section. The boundary between the two concessions was located at the Salguero Tunnel.

=== 1st and 2nd sections ===
These sections measured 16,067 metres (16.1 km) in total and required 27 tunnels with a combined length of 10,665 metres (10.7 km). They extended from the Las Piedras valley (León side) to the Salguero valley, the boundary with Section 3.

To support construction, Buergo and Regueral built a 70-cm-gauge tramway that bypassed the tunnels and linked their entrances and exits. Traction on this auxiliary line was provided by locomotives from the Belgian firm Cockerill.

=== 3rd and 4th sections ===
These sections totaled 20,565 metres (20.6 km) and required 29 tunnels with a combined length of 10,080 metres (10.1 km). A suspension bridge and an inclined plane were built to supply construction materials. From Puente de los Fierros station, on the left bank of the Pajares River, a 50-cm-gauge tramway—horse-drawn —crossed the river on a 98-metre bridge, 40 metres above the water, built in Gijón by the Fábrica de Moreda. The line then split toward the Congostinas Tunnel and the inclined plane.

At the base of the incline, a crane placed loaded wagons onto the track, while a steam engine at the Collada station hauled them by cable, counterbalanced by descending wagons on a single track with a passing loop. Over gradients of 22° to 40°, the system overcame a 350-metre elevation gain in a short distance. A second crane at the top removed the wagons for unloading. This system allowed engineers Calleja and Inchaurraudieta to complete the upper section without interruption.

== Inauguration ==
=== Ceremony ===
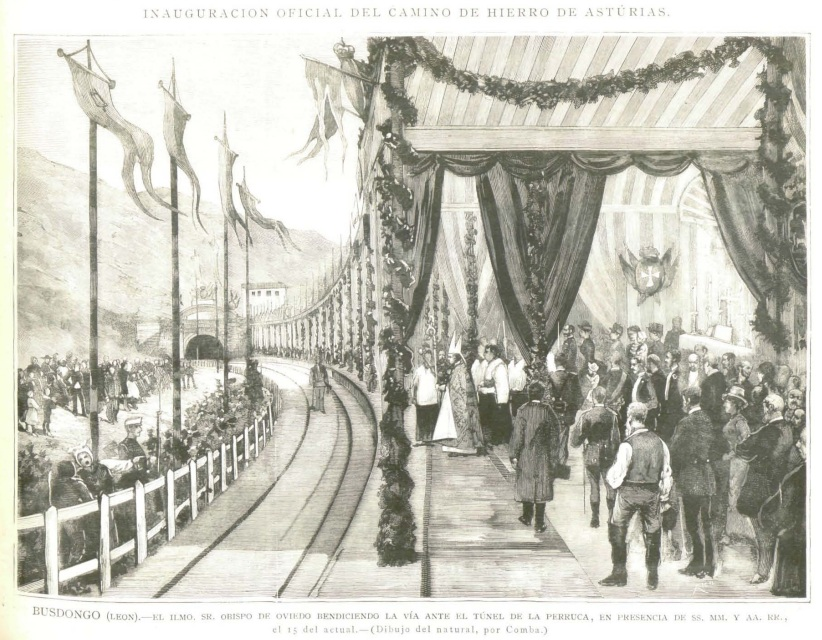
Official inauguration of the Asturian railway: the Bishop of Oviedo blesses the track in front of the Perruca tunnel on 15 August 1884; drawing by Juan Comba published in La Ilustración Española y Americana on 30 August 1884.

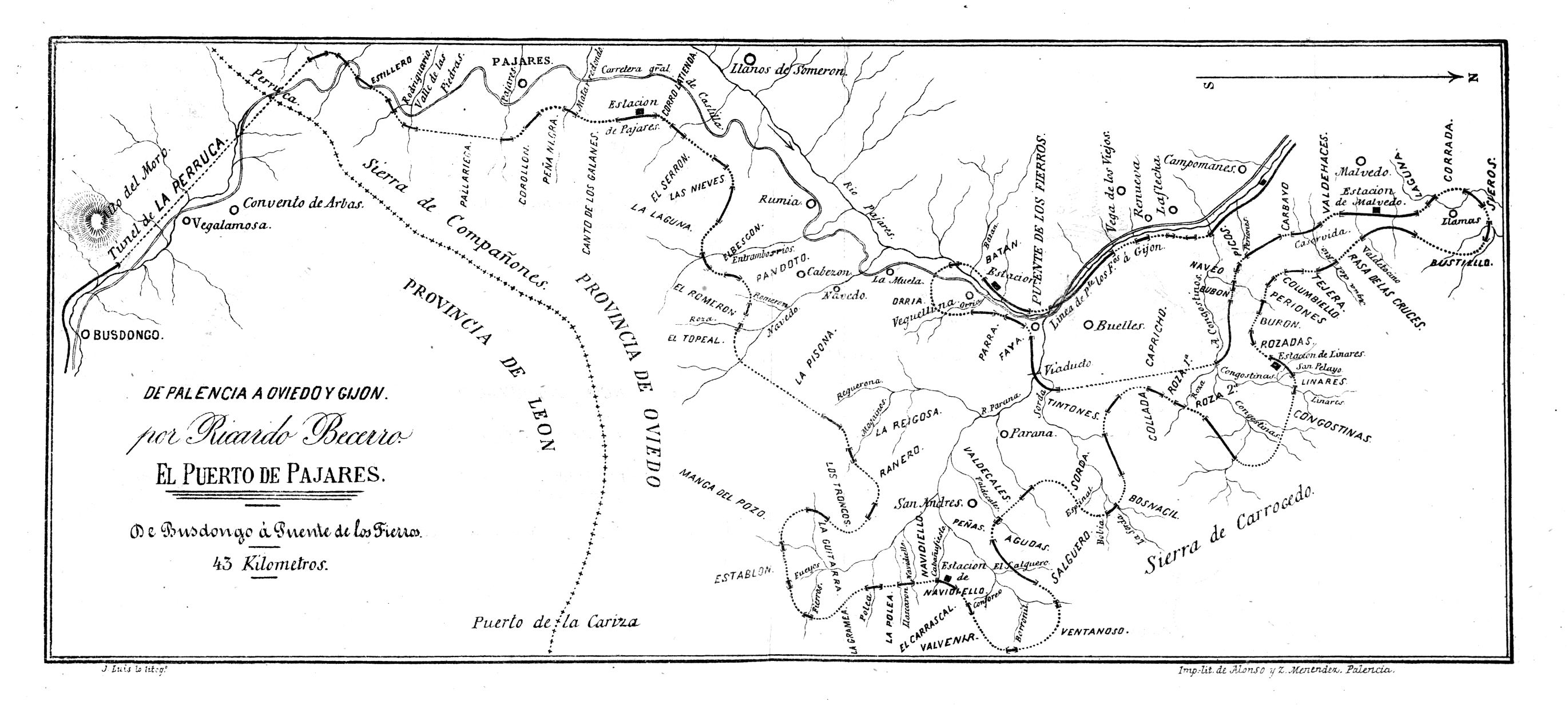
The Pajares pass: from Busdongo to Puente de los Fierros (43 km) by Ricardo Becerro de Bengoa (1884).

The Busdongo–Puente de los Fierros section was inaugurated on 15 August 1884 at the southern entrance of the Perruca Tunnel, attended by King Alfonso XII, Queen Maria Christina of Austria, the Princess of Asturias María de las Mercedes de Borbón, and Congress president Francisco de Borja Queipo de Llano.

The royal party arrived at Busdongo on a royal train that had departed from Segovia the previous evening at 9 pm. The ceremony included the bishop of Oviedo blessing the line, the king laying the final rail, and the signing of the inaugural act (the Princess of Asturias's first official signature, as she was nearly four years old), which was then sealed in a lead box and buried beneath the tunnel. The train then continued toward Gijón, stopping at the Burón and Parana viaducts and at Puente de los Fierros for lunch, served by the Lardhy restaurant of Madrid.

=== Consequences of the opening of the line ===
The full opening of the Pajares line ended stagecoach travel across the pass, as passengers had previously transferred between trains and road coaches at Puente de los Fierros and Busdongo.

The line also boosted development of the Caudal coal basin in Asturias. Improved links—especially after the opening of docks at Gijón in 1885, connected to the Compañía de los Caminos de Hierro del Norte de España network—encouraged new mining investment, including ventures by Antonio López y López.

== Acquisition by the Compañía de los Caminos de Hierro del Norte de España ==
Shortly after its inauguration, in May 1885, the line came under the control of the Compañía de los Caminos de Hierro del Norte de España following its merger with the Compañía de los Ferrocarriles de Asturias, Galicia y León.

=== Operations with double traction ===
According to figures published in 1907 by Félix Boix, deputy director of the Compañía de los Caminos de Hierro del Norte de España, trials began in 1906 to introduce double traction—adding a second locomotive to freight trains—on the ramp. With 16 daily runs, net capacity reached 2,000 tonnes per day, and the system increased the load per train by about 80%.

To support this, the company ordered twelve locomotives in 1907 (nos. 2651–2662), the first Iberian-gauge engines in Asturias to use superheated steam. Known as the "Verracos" they owed their nickname to the pig-like sound produced by the trumpet-type steam ejector of their automatic vacuum brake system. The nickname, which originated in Asturias, was later extended to other locomotives frequently used on the Pajares line until its electrification of the ramp.

== Electrification ==
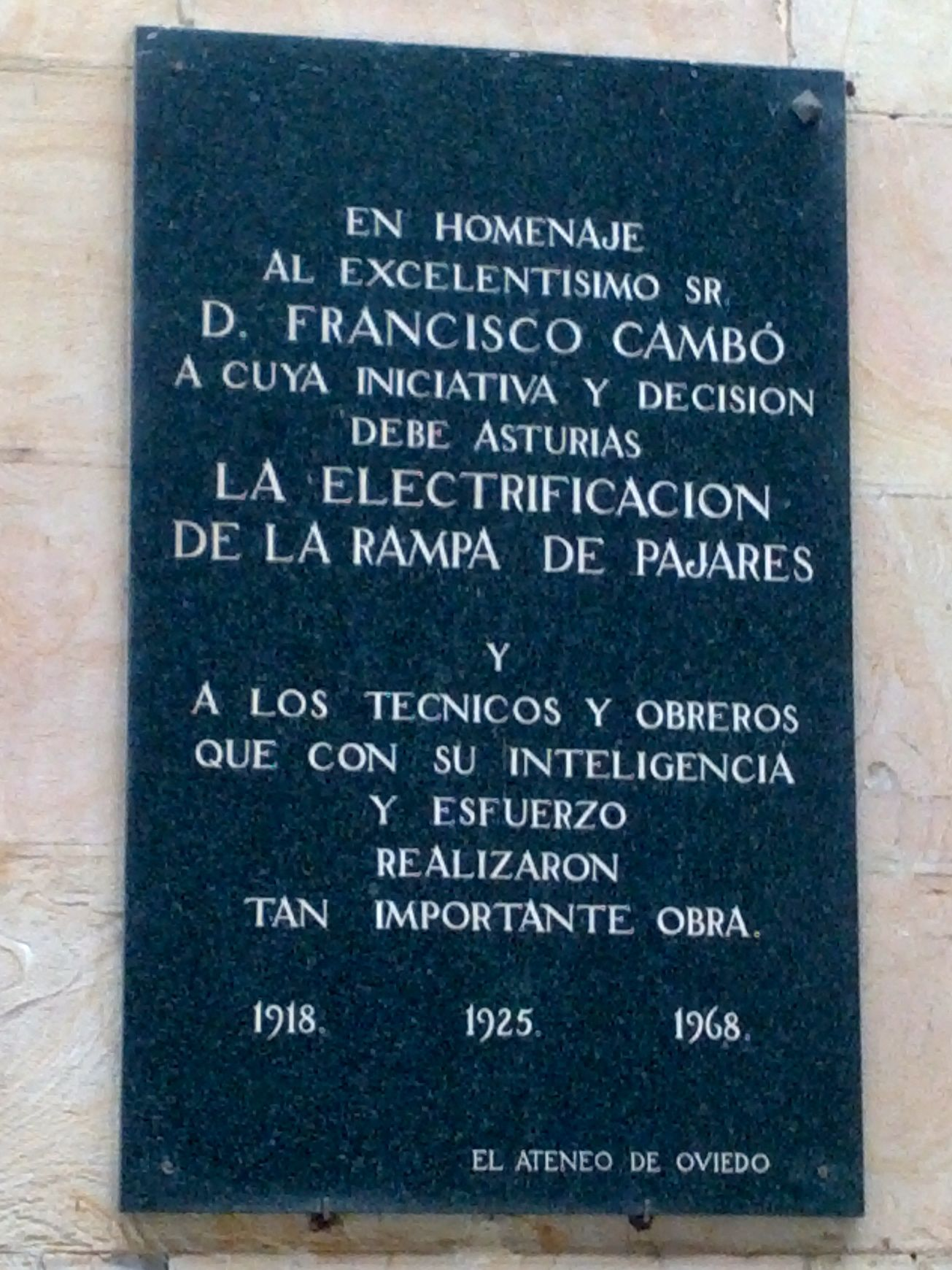
Plaque placed in May 1968 in honour of Francesc Cambó to celebrate the 50th anniversary of his decision to electrify the Pajares ramp, of which he was the promoter. The plaque is located at Oviedo railway station.

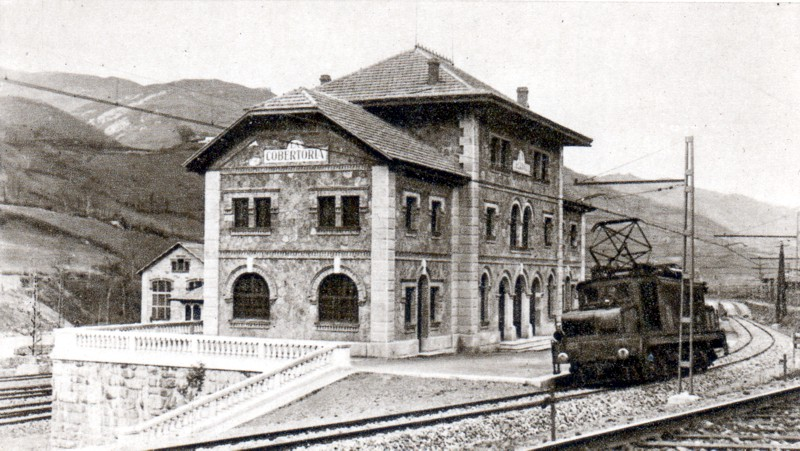
A class 6100 locomotive passing through La Cobertoria station in 1925.

Before 1915, coal transport from Asturias to inland Spain was near the capacity limit of trains on the Pajares ramp. Maximum uphill capacity reached 4,536 gross tonnes with fourteen daily double-headed runs, though under normal conditions it was about 4,248 tonnes with twelve such runs. Electrification was seen as the simplest way to increase capacity, providing roughly 50% more power for the same locomotive weight.

In 1918, under minister Francesc Cambó, legislation authorized electrification, enabling the Compañía de los Caminos de Hierro del Norte de España to proceed despite financial difficulties through repayable advances.

In 1924, the 62-km section between Ujo and Busdongo was electrified at 3 kV DC, the first electrification at this voltage in Spain. The system, proposed by General Electric, was chosen over alternative AC technologies.

Power was supplied by the Electra de Viesgo thermal plant at Santa Cruz de Mieres, near Ujo. From there a 30 kV line fed substations at La Cobertoria and Pajares, where the current was converted to 3 kV DC.

For operations on the ramp, the Compañía de los Caminos de Hierro del Norte de España acquired two series of six electric locomotives. Units 6001–6006 (1923) were built in the United States by the American Locomotive Company (mechanical part) and General Electric (electrical part). A second batch, 6101–6106(1924), was produced by the Sociedad Española de Construcción Naval and Baldwin Locomotive Works, with electrical systems by Westinghouse Electric Company. All developed 1,620 hp (1,210 kW) and had a Co–Co wheel arrangement. Stations at the ends of the electrified section (Busdongo and Ujo) were also modified to accommodate both steam and electric operations.

In addition to electrifying the line, the Compañía de los Caminos de Hierro del Norte de España carried out works to increase capacity on the Venta de Baños–Gijón route. Stations along the Pajares ramp were lengthened, and a marshalling yard was built at La Cobertoria to handle freight from the port of Gijón.

== Traffic ==
=== Passenger trains ===
From 15 September 2008, the Pajares ramp was served daily by the overnight Estrella "Pio Baroja" train running between Gijón and Barcelona via Burgos and Miranda de Ebro. Long-distance services were complemented by three daily Alvia round trips, some stopping at Pola de Lena, and two daily regional services between Gijón and León.

Since 2013, services pattern have been reduced, with one regional round trip replaced by an Alvia service making limited intermediate stops. By June 2021, weekday service consisted of one Media Distancia train from Valladolid-Campo Grande and two to three Alvia trains in each direction.

=== Freight trains ===
In 2008 around 20 freight trains per day ran via the Pajares ramp.

A 1,000-tonne freight train took on average 117 minutes to travel between Pola de Lena and La Robla stations, including two intermediate stops (average 23 minutes each) for crossing opposing trains. Operating cost on this section was estimated at €10.94 per train-km for freight trains.

== See also ==
- Oviedo
- Pajares
- Lena, Asturias

== Bibliography ==
- Bas Ordóñez, Guillermo (2012). "La arquitectura de las electrificaciones de la compañía del Norte" (PDF). Docutren (in Spanish). Archived from the original (PDF) on 2013-12-02.
- Castañón Fernández, Luciano. "El Pajares ferroviario". Las comunicaciones entre Asturias y León (in Spanish). Oviedo: Caja de Ahorros de Asturias. ISBN 84-500-3890-1.
- Fernández Sanz, Fernando (2011). Locomotoras de la compañía Norte (in Spanish). Vol. II (2nd ed.). Madrid: Revistas Profesionales. ISBN 978-84-938608-3-7.
- Fernández-Hontoria Uhagón, Ricardo; García Lomas, José María (1923). "Electrificación de la rampa de Pajares". Revista de Obras Públicas (in Spanish). I (2385): 88–92. ISSN 0034-8619.
- Fernández-Hontoria Uhagón, Ricardo; García Lomas, José María (1923). "Electrificación de la rampa de Pajares". Revista de Obras Públicas (in Spanish). I (2387): 127–133. ISSN 0034-8619.
- González Ferrer, Roberto (1883). "Una visita á las obras del ferro-carril de Asturias" (PDF). Revista Minera y Metalúrgica (in Spanish) (I(4)): 47–49.
- Hacar Rodríguez, Fernando; González Crespo, Jorge Luis (2003). Pajares: No hay palabras para describirlo (in Spanish).
- Rodríguez Muñoz, Javier (2002). "Cronología de Asturias". Diccionario histórico de Asturias (in Spanish). Oviedo: Prensa Asturiana. ISBN 8487730906.
