= León-Gijón railway line =

Railway line Leon-Gijon

León-Gijón Railway Line
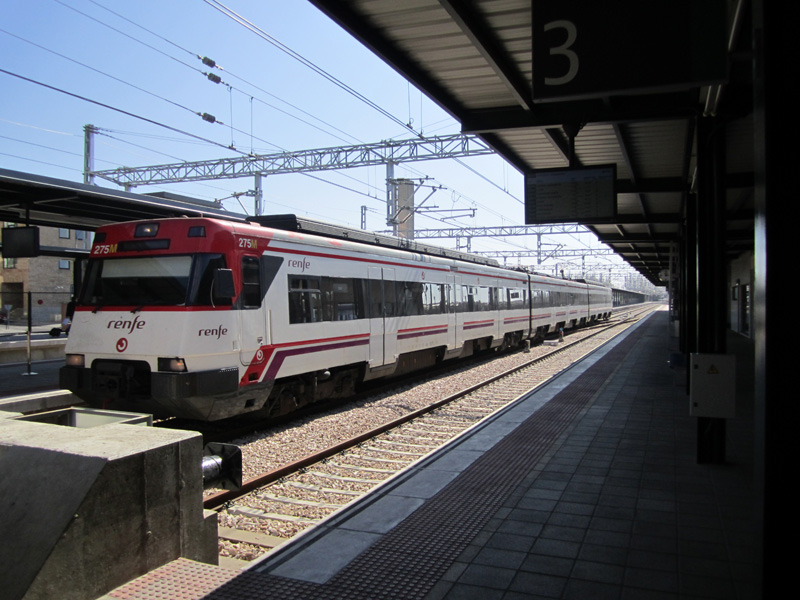
- Unit 447 providing the Regional service between León and Gijón, at the provisional station of León.

Overview
- Locale: Spain
- Transit type: Rail transport

Operation
- Operation will start: August 15, 1884
- Operators: (passengers and freight); Acciona Rail Services (freight)

Technical
- System length: 171 km
- No. of tracks: 2 (León-La Robla); 1 (La Robla-Pola de Lena); 2 (Pola de Lena-Gijón)
- Track gauge: Iberian
- Electrification: Catenary at 3 kV DC
- Top speed: 160 km/h (León-La Robla); 105 km/h (La Robla-Pola de Lena); 130 km/h (Pola de Lena-Gijón)

The León-Gijón railway line, also known as the Asturias railway line, is an Iberian gauge railway line connecting the Spanish towns of León and Gijón. It serves as the primary railway access to Asturias from the plateau. The Rampa de Pajares section, which completed the railway communication between Asturias and León, was inaugurated on August 15, 1884.

The line is currently a section of the Venta de Baños-Gijón railway, part of the Red Ferroviaria de Interés General (in English: General Interest Railway Network). (Note: In accordance with Law 39/2003, of November 17, 2003, on the Railway Sector, the "Railway Network of General Interest (Red Ferroviaria de Interés General) is made up of the railway infrastructures that are essential to guarantee a common railway transport system throughout the State territory or whose joint administration is necessary for the correct operation of such common transport system, such as those linked to international traffic routes, those that link the different autonomous communities and their connections and accesses to the main population and transport centers or to essential facilities for the economy or national defense.")

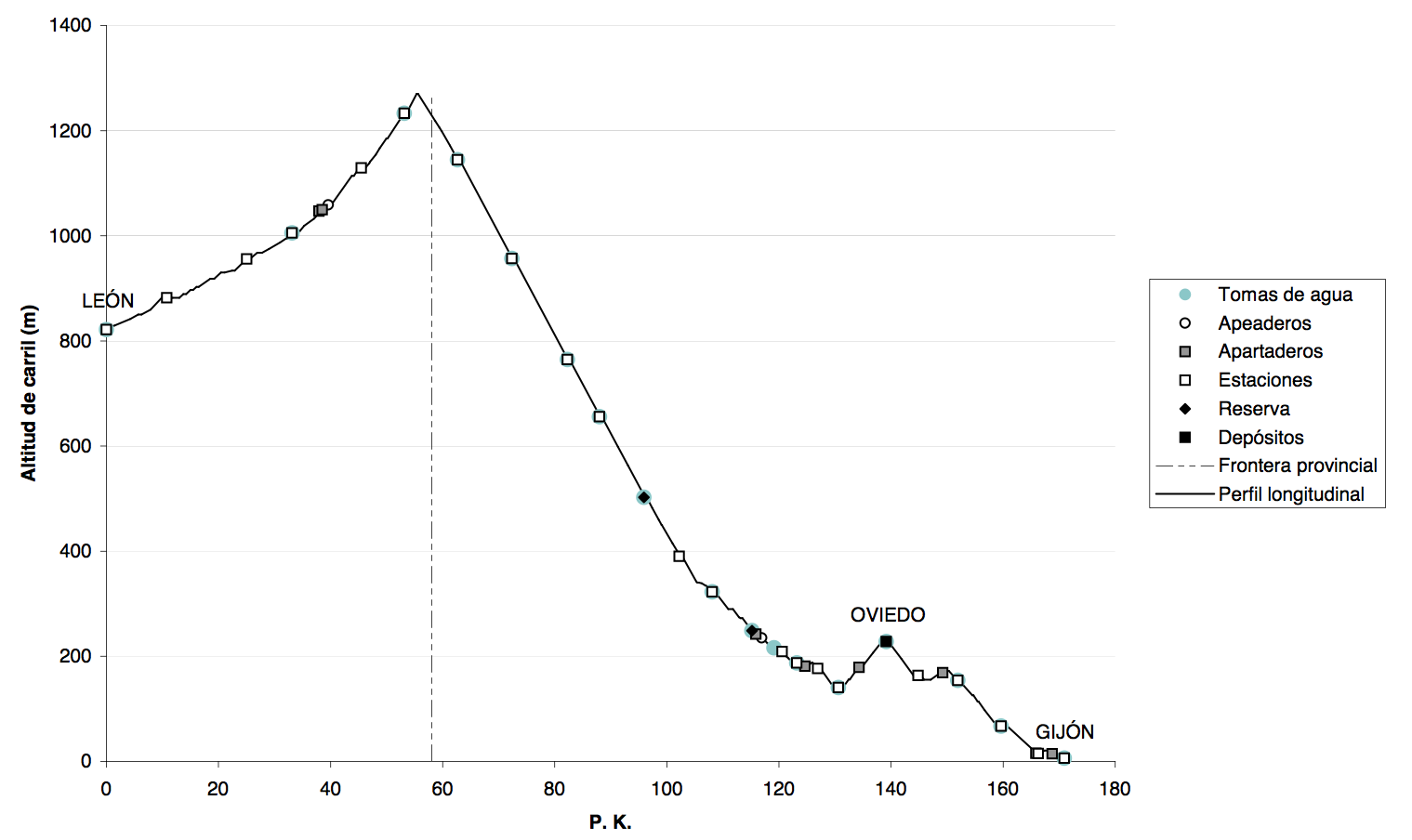
Longitudinal profile of the line in 1921, with indication of its dependencies.

== History ==
The connection between Asturias and the Meseta Central (in English: Inner Plateau) was a long-standing goal of Asturian industrial companies and the Oviedo Provincial Council since the regular exploitation of Asturian coal began in the 1840s. It would also serve as an outlet for agricultural products from León and Castile. As a result, traders, businessmen, and the Asturian press soon requested it. Despite being "the first iron and coal producing region" of Spain in the 1870s, Asturias was not connected to the rest of the country by rail until 1884. This delay in railway connection was detrimental to "the growth possibilities of both regions", causing difficulties in transporting industrial and agricultural products to other markets.

The timeline for commissioning the various sections of the line, including the concessionary company and section length, is as follows:

Chronology of commissioning of the line sections
Date	Section	Company	Length (km)
01/17/1868	León-La Robla	Northwest	25,048
08/01/1868	La Robla-Pola de Gordón	Northwest	8,100
05/23/1872	Pola de Gordón-Busdongo	Northwest	19,910
07/23/1874	Pola de Lena-Gijón	Northwest	62,774
05/15/1881	Bridge of Los Fierros-Pola de Lena	———	12,201
08/15/1884	Busdongo-Puente de los Fierros	A.G.L.	42,775

At León station, the line connected with the Palencia-La Coruña line. This line's Palencia-León section was put into operation on November 8, 1863. Similarly, in Palencia, it connected with the Venta de Baños-Alar, which was inaugurated on August 1, 1860. This line connected with the Madrid-Hendaye railway, which was completed on August 15, 1864.

=== Background ===
The Asturian Mining Company, owned by the British, established in Mieres by Richard Kelly, was responsible for the first rail link between León and Asturias. On December 31, 1844, a resolution was passed granting a concession for the construction of an iron road from Avilés to León. The company intended to use the railroad to sell its rail products in the Castilian market. According to the Madrid newspaper El Heraldo, the concession was for 80 years. The company, with a capital of 2 million pounds, was to be called "Compañía del Real camino de hierro del Norte de España". Luciano Castañón wrote that the enterprise failed due to the bond demanded by the Spanish government and the disappointment of the UK envoys. They "discovered that the country, which they believed to be as flat as Arrowsmith's map, presented such insignificant obstacles to the project as several leagues of mountain ranges, whose peaks reached 6,000 to 9,000 feet and were covered with snow for several months of the year. This was a complete disappointment," said Richard Ford in his 1846 publication Cosas de España.

In 1858, with the Asturian José Francisco Uría y Riego as Director General of Public Works, a law of April 21 allowed the government to award, by public auction, the concession of a railroad line that, starting from Palencia, would reach the ports of La Coruña and Vigo, passing through León. The branch line to Asturias from the line itself would form part of this line. In 1861, the route of the branch line was drawn up by the engineers Eduardo Gutiérrez Calleja and Saturnino Adana, and was put up for auction at the end of the same. The line was to start from Palencia to Ponferrada in León and reach Gijón via Pola de Gordón, Santibáñez, Moreda and Oviedo, with a length of 194.533 km. It had a budget of 330 million reales and a public subsidy of 166,035,965.15 rs (50.3%).

Until 1864, there were several proposals to take over the work in exchange for modifying its layout, all of them rejected. On November 10, 1862, the Marquis of Salamanca proposed raising the slope of the route from 1.5 to 4.5 ‰ and reducing the radius of the curves to 250 m, with the aim of keeping the subsidy of a technically unfeasible work.

On January 1, 1863, the French engineer Gabriel Heim, director of the Sociedad Hullera de Quirós and member of the French Geological Society, proposed an alternative route to connect the line from Palencia to Galicia with Asturias. With a budget of 252 million reales, his project, elaborated over seven years, proposed a line starting from Benavides de Órbigo, crossing the Cantabrian mountain range through the Puerto de Ventana (in English Ventana Port) and reaching San Esteban de Pravia. The line would cross Babia, Quirós and Proaza and from Trubia there would be branches to Mieres and Noreña, passing through Oviedo. In Noreña it would connect with the Langreo Railway, which communicated Gijón with Langreo.

On November 10, 1864, the government again put the work out to bid with a new budget of 387.8 million, maintaining the subsidy for 50.3% of the total.

=== Construction ===
In 1864, Juan Manuel de Manzanedo obtained the concession to build the line. Later that same year, Manzanedo transferred the concession to José Ruiz de Quevedo.

The Compañía de Ferrocarril del Noroeste de España began building the line, but went bankrupt before completing it in 1878. Prior to the bankruptcy, the company finished the line between León and Busdongo in the province of León, as well as between Pola de Lena and Gijón on the Asturian side. The Rampa de Pajares, the most complicated section due to the unevenness that had to be overcome, had yet to be completed and was undertaken by the Compañía de los Ferrocarriles de Asturias, Galicia y León.

Finally, the Pajares ramp was inaugurated on August 15, 1884, with the attendance of King Alfonso XII and his wife María Cristina de Habsburgo-Lorena. The official ceremony took place in Busdongo, at the southern mouth of the La Perruca tunnel.

=== Norte ===
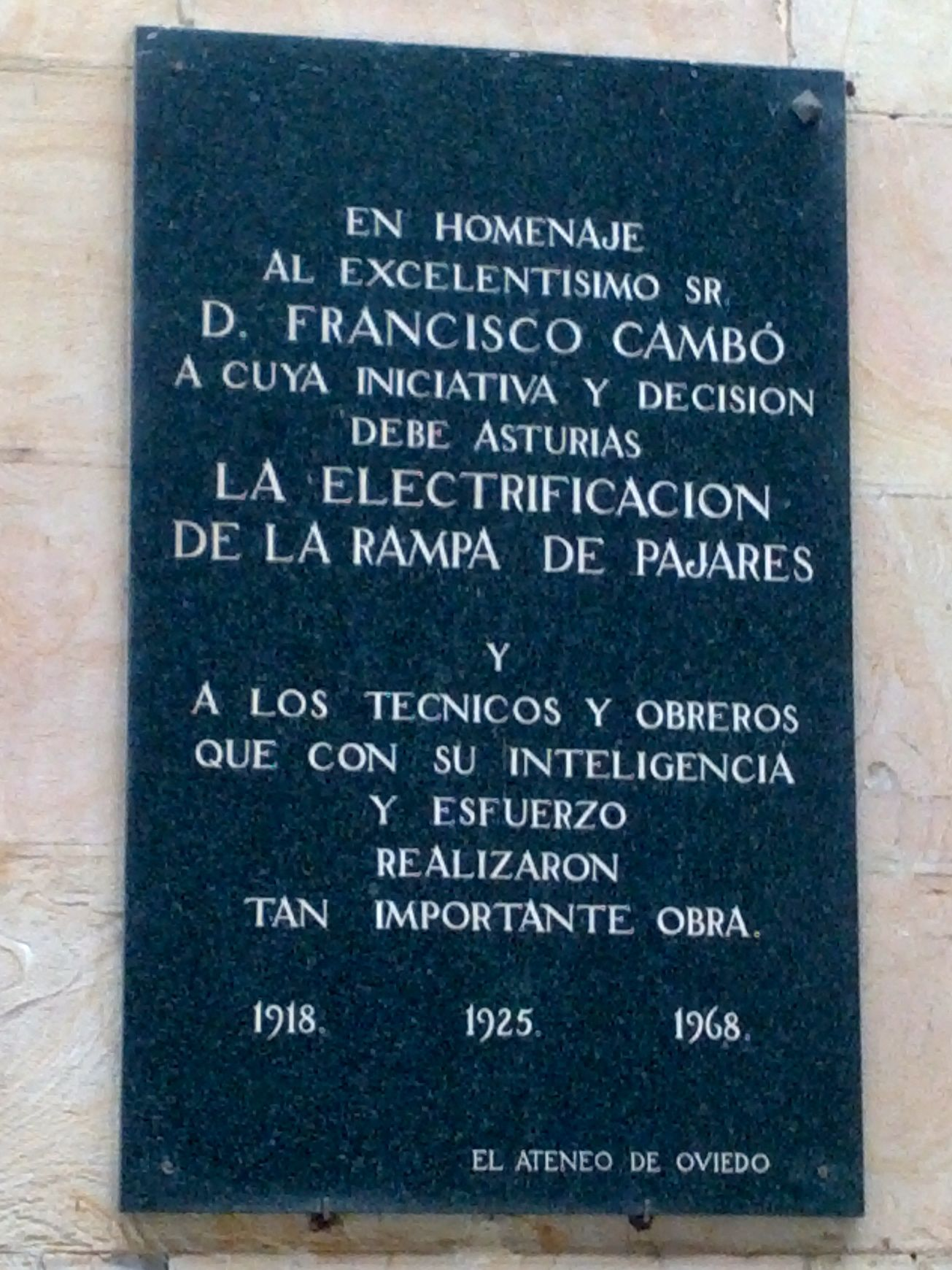
Plaque placed in May 1968 to celebrate the 50th anniversary of the law of electrification of the Pajares ramp in honor of Francesc Cambó, its promoter. Oviedo Station.

Shortly after the complete route of the line was inaugurated on May 1, 1885, it was acquired by the Compañía de los Caminos de Hierro del Norte de España through a merger with the Compañía de los Ferrocarriles de Asturias, Galicia y León, in which it already had a stake. From then on, the Norte expanded its network in Asturias by building branches of the León-Gijón line, with the aim of adding traffic to its trunk lines. Norte already had in Asturias the Oviedo-Trubia railway, inaugurated on April 30, 1883, and transferred from A.G.L. To this line he added, in 1890, the Villabona-Avilés railway, which would later continue to San Juan de Nieva. And in 1894, the Soto de Rey-Ciaño Santa Ana, reaching the Nalón basin, to capture the traffic of its coals.

The limited transport capacity of Asturian coal to the interior of the Peninsula pushed the company to undertake the electrification of the Busdongo-Ujo section (Rampa de Pajares), the first to be electrified in 3 kV direct current in Spain, in 1924. This work would not have been possible without the impulse of the Ministry of Development Francesc Cambó.

=== RENFE ===
In 1941, Norte was integrated into RENFE, with all its lines. It was at this time that the branch line from Tudela-Veguín to Lugo de Llanera was built through the La Grandota tunnel. Inaugurated in 1957, the line, 14.9 km long, prevented coal trains heading for the ports of Avilés and Gijón from crossing the city of Oviedo and the ramps at Las Segadas.

In 1955, Renfe completed the electrification of the entire route, between Ujo and Gijón (January 4) and between León and Busdongo (November 23). Between 1966 and 1968, centralized traffic control was implemented on the line and on its branches to San Juan de Nieva and El Entrego, totaling 219 km of track, with a command post in Oviedo.

As part of the Asturias Railway Infrastructure Plan, initiated in 1970, renovation and improvement works were carried out on the line and its branches. Executed in 2 phases, the plan contemplated the increase of the transport capacity, including the Rampa de Pajares. Thus, in 1973 (2nd phase), work began on doubling the track between Pola de Lena and Veriña, a railway junction that underwent improvement works, with new accesses. Within this double track section, the section between Soto de Rey and Lugo de Llanera was the first to be double-tracked in Spain, in 1977.

== Rail services ==
=== Medium distance ===
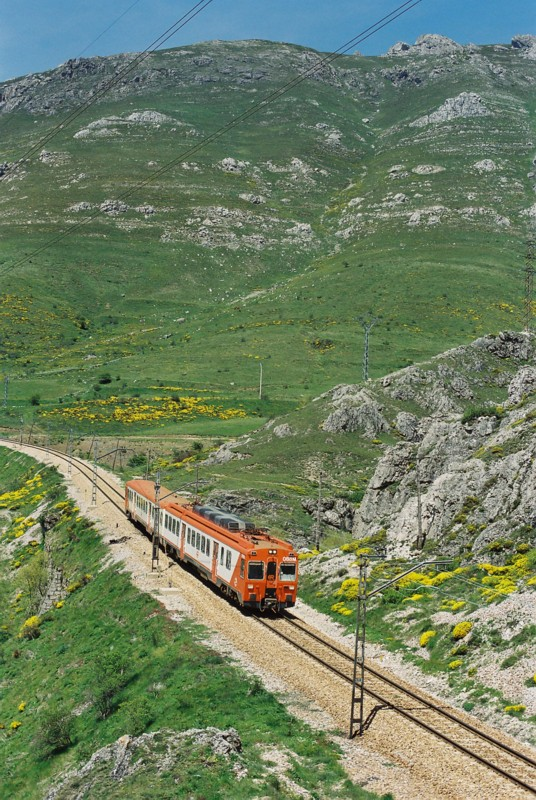
A RENFE series 440 train unit on the León - Gijón line at Busdongo.

Between Gijón and León, there is a medium distance connection (Regional), which connects both cities. Officially, in December 2012 the Ministry of Public Works included the service among those to be eliminated during 2013, due to its low occupancy. Data for 2011 indicated that it was 14.9%, with 31,231 passengers. Subsequently, the Council of Ministers approved that the medium distance line would continue to operate as a public service obligation, with funding from the General State Administration.

According to the report Definition of Medium Distance Railway Services to be governed by Public Service Obligations, dated April 2012, carried out by Ineco on behalf of the Secretary of State for Transport of the Ministry of Public Works, in 2010 a total of 1272 train movements were carried out on the line, at a rate of 25 per week, according to data provided by Renfe Operadora. According to this report, in that year 34,237 passengers used the medium distance services of the León-Gijón line, with an average of 27 passengers per circulation, which is equivalent to a 6.5% occupancy rate of the seats offered. However, seasonal circulations (summer weekends), reached occupancies above 50%. As for the economic aspect, according to Renfe Operadora data, the line would have had an operating deficit of €1,085,746, with revenues covering 14.9% of expenses in 2010.

Since June 2, 2013, weekly circulations went from 25 to 14 (one daily round trip). In addition, another 14 circulations began to be provided by long-distance services, which increase the number of stops between the two capitals.

=== Goods ===
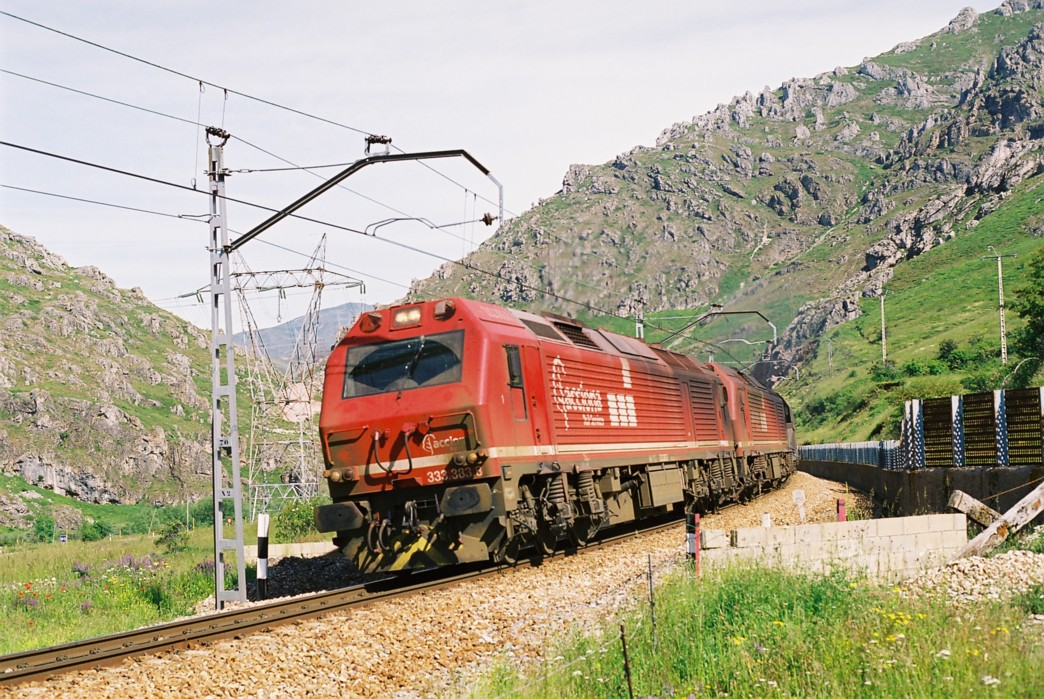
Acciona Rail Services diesel-electric locomotive 333.383 at Busdongo.

In 2007, Acciona Rail Services began transporting coal imported through the port of Gijón to the La Robla thermal power plant in León, using its own means, along the line, making it the first private company to provide a comprehensive freight service using the public rail network in Spain after its liberalization.

== See also ==
- History of Asturias

== Bibliography ==
- Rodríguez Muñoz, Javier (2002). "Cronología de Asturias". Diccionario histórico de Asturias (in Spanish). Oviedo: Prensa Asturiana. ISBN 8487730906.
- Castañón Fernández, Luciano (1980). "El Pajares ferroviario". Las comunicaciones entre Asturias y León (in Spanish) (Caja de Ahorros de Asturias ed.). Oviedo. ISBN 84-500-3890-1.
- Comín Comín, Francisco; Martín-Aceña, Pablo; Muñoz Rubio, Miguel; Vidal Olivares, Javier (1998). 150 Años de Historia de los Ferrocarriles Españoles (in Spanish). Fundación de los Ferrocarriles Españoles y Anaya. ISBN 84-88675-496.
- Ojeda, Germán (1985). Asturias en la industrialización española, 1833-1907 (in Spanish). Oviedo: Universidad de Oviedo, Servicio de Publicaciones. ISBN 978-84-323-0521-4.
