= Autovía A-66 =

Motorway in Spain

Autovía A-66
- Autovía Ruta de la Plata
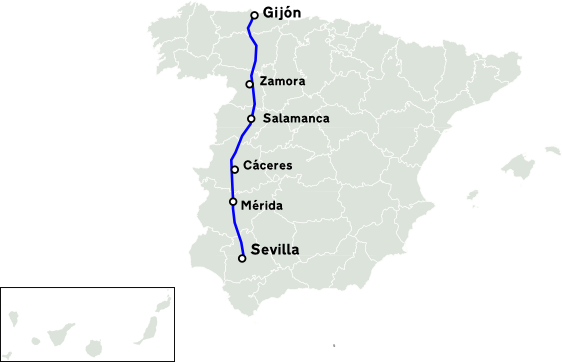

Route information
- Part of E803
- Length: 809 km (503 mi)

Major junctions
- From: Gijón
- To: Seville

Location
- Country: Spain

Highway system
- Highways in Spain; Autopistas and autovías; National Roads

The Autovía A-66 is a major highway in western Spain, part of the European route E803. The road is an upgrade of the N-630 which was undertaken section by section. The route roughly corresponds to the ancient Roman 'Silver Route' connecting the cities of Mérida and Astorga.

== Route ==
Autovía A-66 starts at Seville with a junction with the Autovía A-49. It heads north through the wooded Sierra Morena and passes over the Puerto de las Marismas. It then crosses from Andalucia into Extremadura. It heads through the town of Zafra on the way to Mérida crossing the Tierra de Barros. It ends in a junction with the Autovía A-5.

North of Mérida the road crosses the Sierra de San Pedro to the town and world heritage site of Cáceres. Then the road crosses the Tajo and Almonte rivers. The road heads north east as it enters the Sierra de Gredos. The road becomes the N-630 (at km 489) south of the town of Plasencia. It then heads to the university town of Salamanca via Béjar. The road crosses the Rio Tormes and the Autovía A-62. The section north of Zamora leading to the Rio Duero. 18 km north where the road will meet the reservoir Embalse del Esla de Ricobayo is under construction as of October 2013. Here the N-630 heads north west to the Autovía A-52, and the N-630 along the Rio Esla to the Autovía A-6. 6 km north the A-66 branches to the north with a downgraded N-630 parallel. The road then enters the province of León.

=== Autopista AP-66 ===
At León the road becomes a toll Autopista AP-66 and the N-630 a trunk road as they pass through the Cordillera Cantábrica. South of León there is a junction with the Autopista AP-71 and Autovía A-231. The N-630 crosses the Alto del Rabizo (1,160m) and Puerto de Pajares (1,379m).

Inaugurated on 11 August 1983, the AP-66 avoid these two passes and goes through the Negrón Tunnel, the sixth longest tunnel in Spain. Entering Asturias, the roads re-converge 36 km south of the next major city Oviedo. There is a junction with the Autovía A-64 and AS-I. The A-66 finally ends 13 km north of Oviedo at a junction with the Autovía A-8 near Gijón on the Atlantic Coast.
