= Autovía A-64 =

Highway in Spain

Autovía A-64
- Autovía Villaviciosa a Oviedo

Route information
- Length: 27 km (17 mi)

Major junctions
- From: Villaviciosa
- To: Oviedo

Location
- Country: Spain

Highway system
- Highways in Spain; Autopistas and autovías; National Roads

The Autovía A-64 is a highway in Spain. It connects the Autovía A-64 junction 367 km with Oviedo.

It heads south east through the Tunnel Fabares, then meets the N-634 before heading west to Oviedo and ending at the Autovía A-66.

The highway supports an average traffic of around 35,000 vehicles per day.
