= Ermita Sagrado Corazón de Jesús =

Coordinates: 36°8′10″N 5°27′55″W

Ermita Sagrado Corazón de Jesús is a Christian church in the western outskirts of Algeciras, Spain, situated just to the northwest of Bahia Park across the main highway to Málaga. The Málaga branch of the Sagrado Corazón de Jesús had been established in the early 1920s. The church is noted for its involvement in nativity contests.
