= Iberia (airline) =

Flag carrier airline of Spain

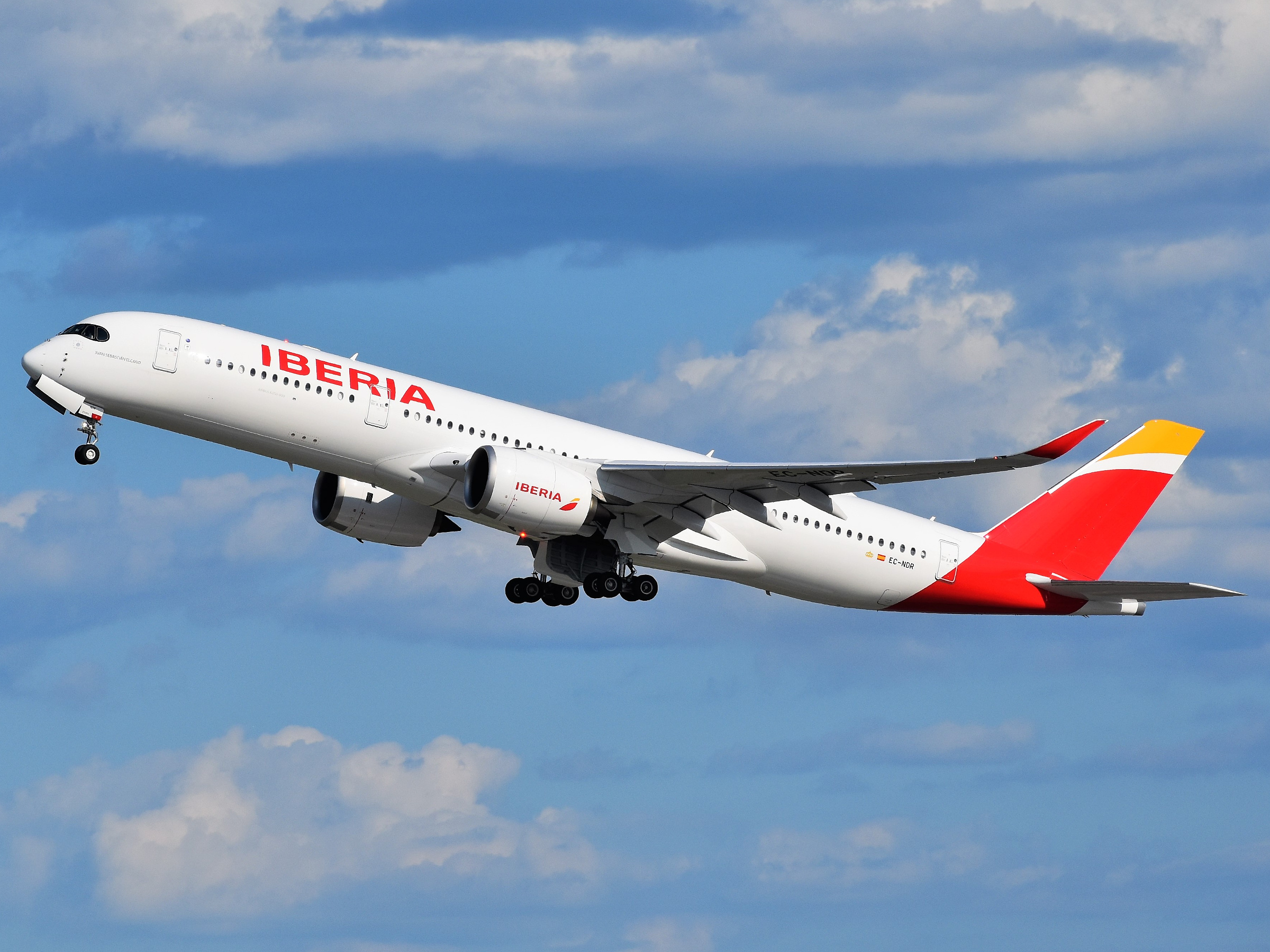
- Iberia Airbus A350-900
IATA	ICAO	Call sign
IB	IBE	IBERIA
- Founded: 28 June 1927; 99 years ago
- Commenced operations: 14 December 1927; 98 years ago
- AOC #: ES.AOC.001
- Hubs: Madrid–Barajas Airport
- Frequent-flyer program: Iberia Club (Part of the Avios Loyalty program)
- Alliance: Oneworld
- Subsidiaries: Iberia Regional (franchise); Iberia Express
- Fleet size: 92
- Destinations: 130
- Parent company: International Airlines Group
- ISIN: ES0147200036
- Headquarters: Ciudad Lineal, Madrid, Spain
- Key people: Marco Sansavini (President & CEO)
- Revenue: ▲€7.54 billion (2024)
- Net income: ▲€1,027 million (2024)
- Employees: 10,812 (2025)
- Website: www.iberia.com

Iberia (Spanish pronunciation: [iˈβeɾja]), legally incorporated as Iberia Líneas Aéreas de España, S.A. Operadora, Sociedad Unipersonal, is the flag carrier of Spain. Founded in 1927 and based in Madrid, it operates an international network of services from its main base of Madrid–Barajas Airport. Iberia, with Iberia Regional (operated by an independent carrier Air Nostrum) and with Iberia Express, is a part of International Airlines Group. In addition to transporting passengers and freight, Iberia Group carries out related activities, such as aircraft maintenance, handling in airports, IT systems and in-flight catering. Iberia Group airlines fly to over 109 destinations in 39 countries, and a further 90 destinations through code-sharing agreements with other airlines.

On 8 April 2010, it was confirmed that British Airways and Iberia had signed an agreement to merge, making the combined operation the third largest commercial airline in the world by revenue. Shareholders of both carriers approved the deal on 29 November 2010. The newly merged company, known as International Airlines Group (IAG), was established in January 2011, although both airlines continue to operate under their respective brands.

== History ==
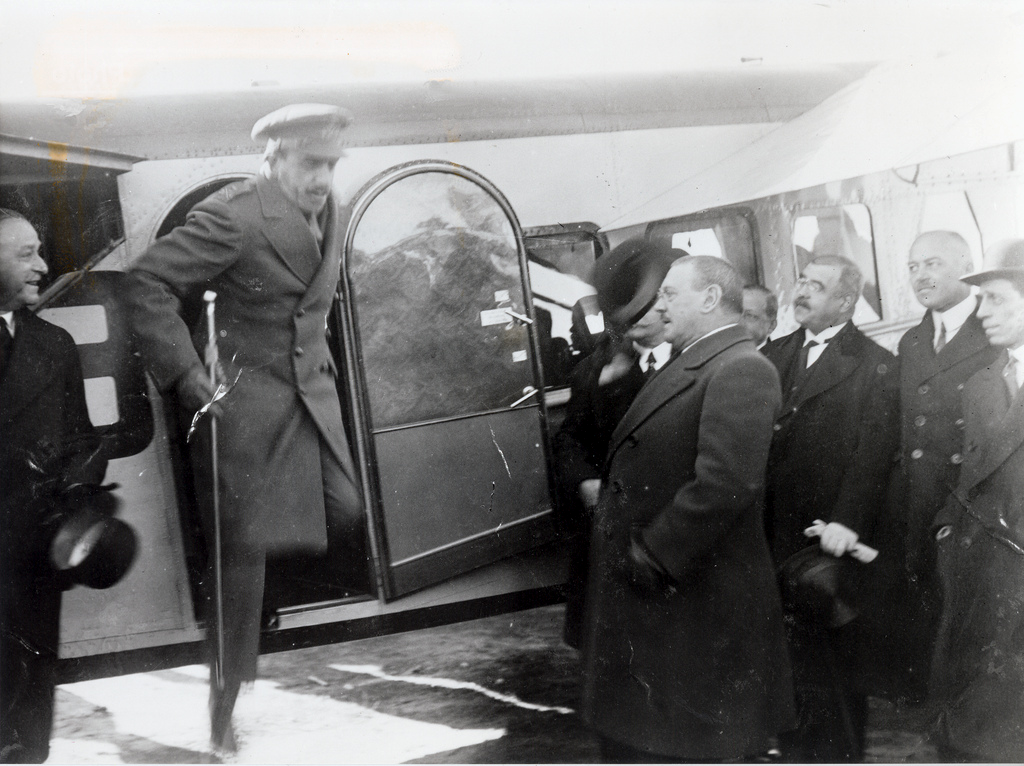
King Alfonso XIII of Spain disembarks from the Rohrbach Ro VIII Roland used for the inaugural flight of Iberia from Madrid to Barcelona in 1927.

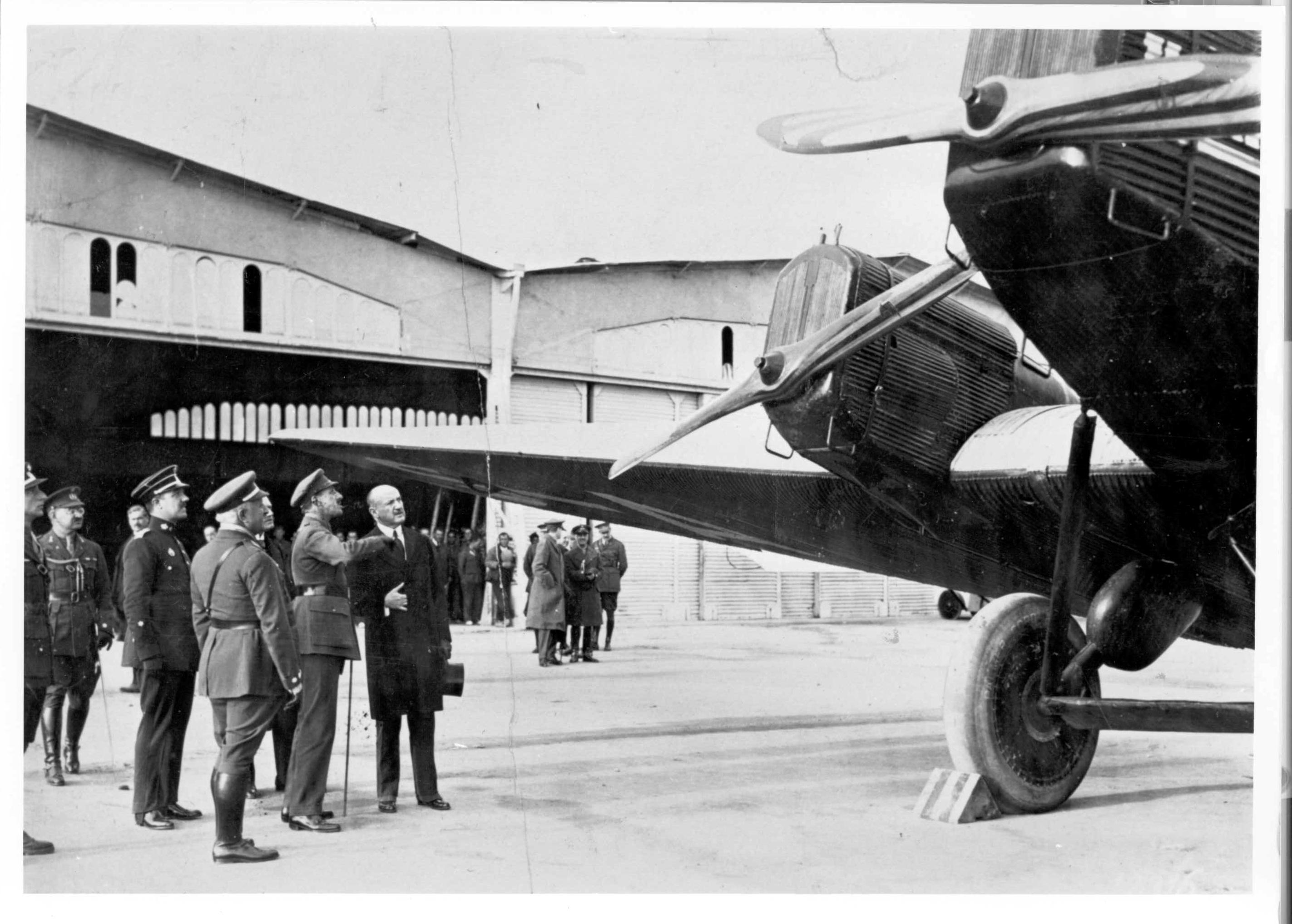
King Alfonso XIII inspects one of the airline's Junkers G 24s.

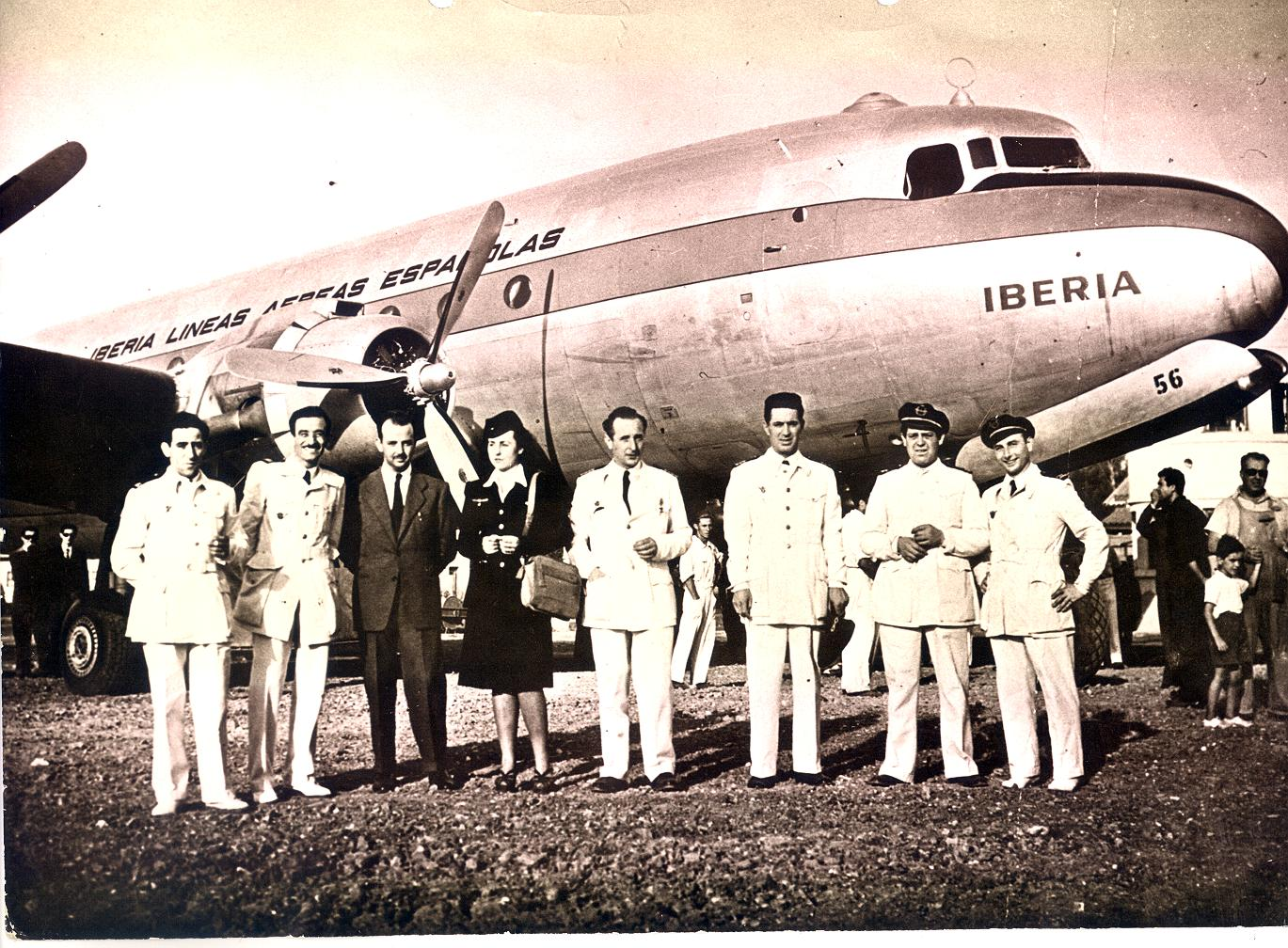
Crew of the inaugural Iberia service to Buenos Aires in 1946 with the Douglas DC-4 used for the flight

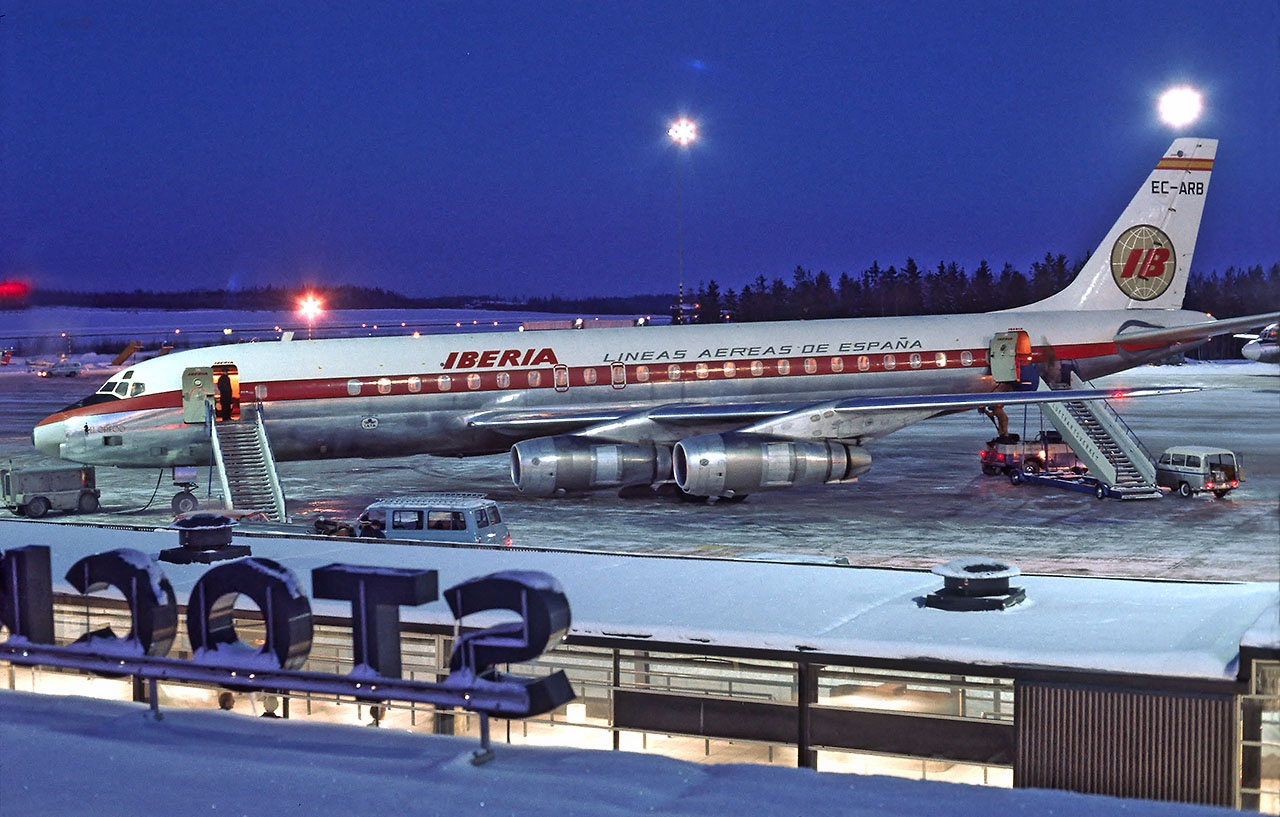
Iberia Douglas DC-8-52 at Stockholm in 1969

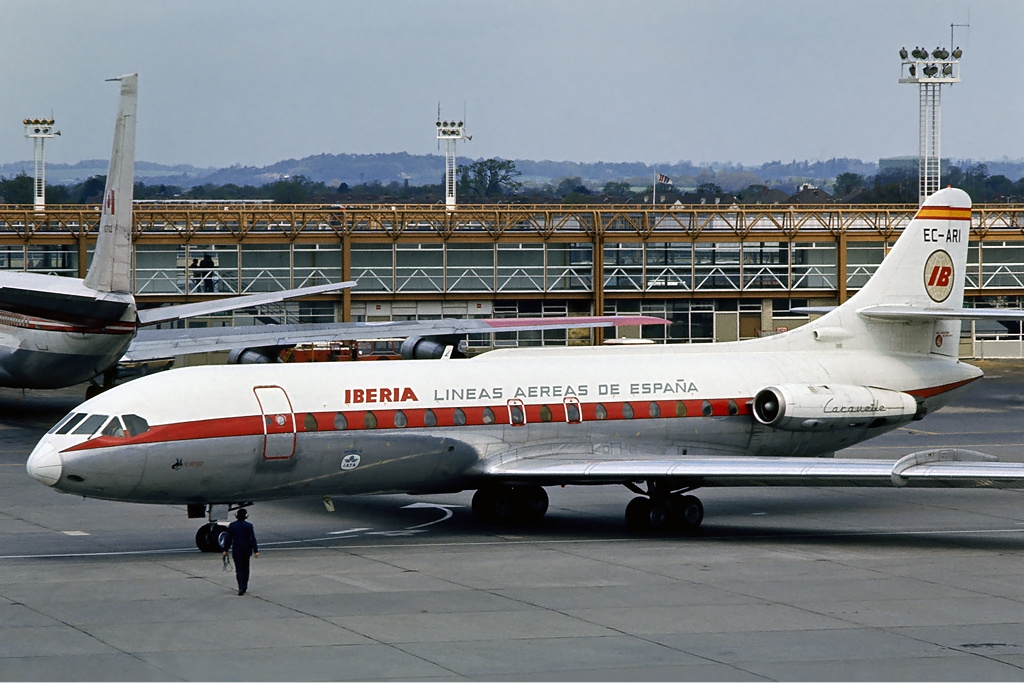
Iberia Sud Aviation Caravelle at London – Gatwick in 1973

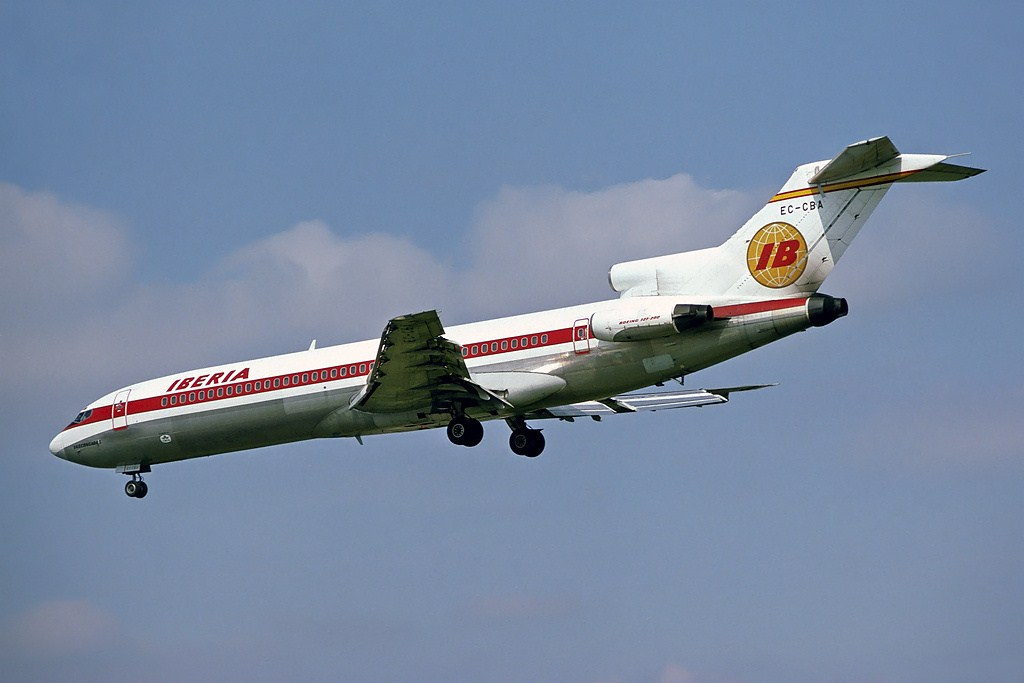
A Boeing 727-200 in 1978

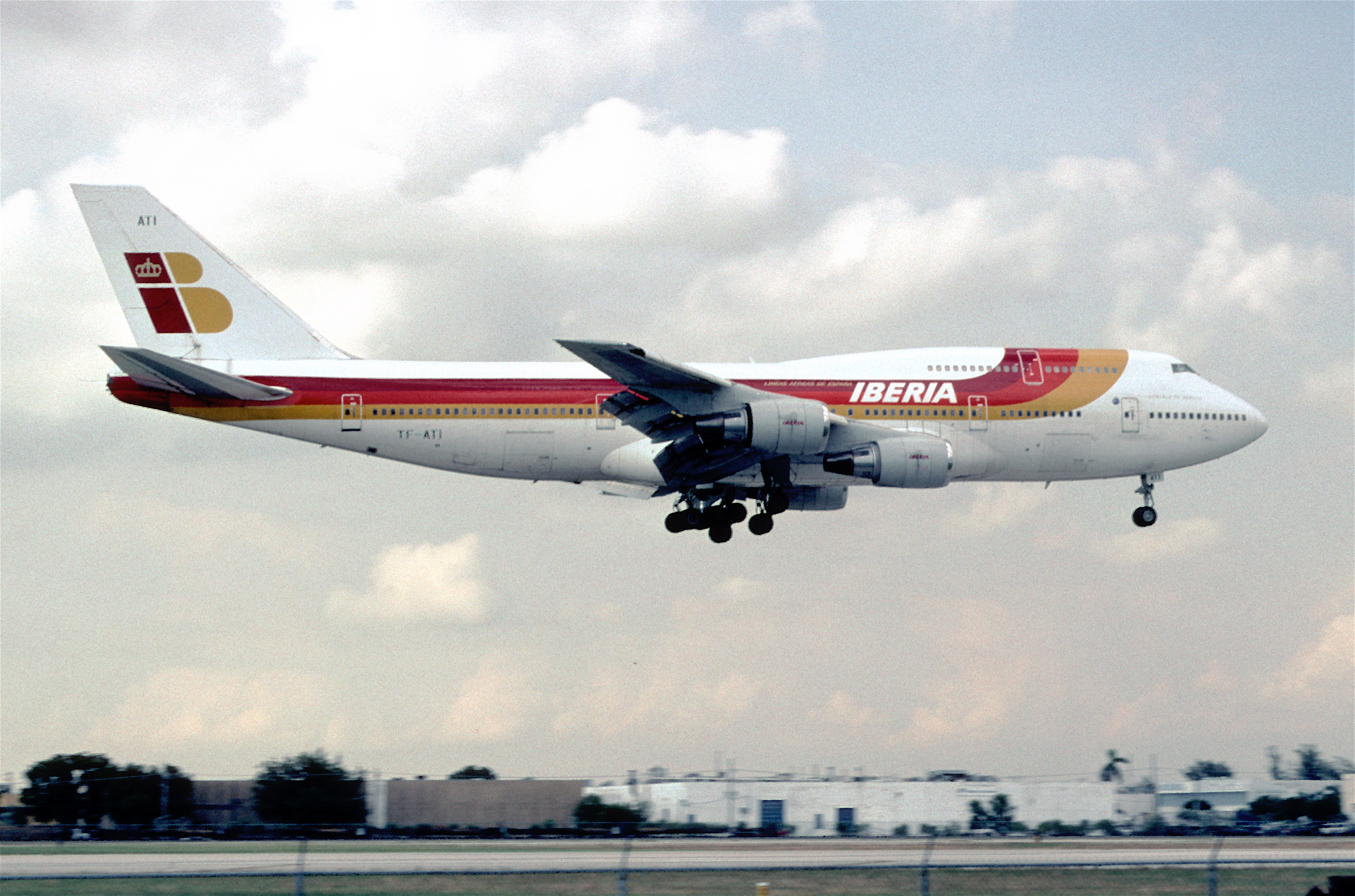
A Boeing 747-300 in 2005

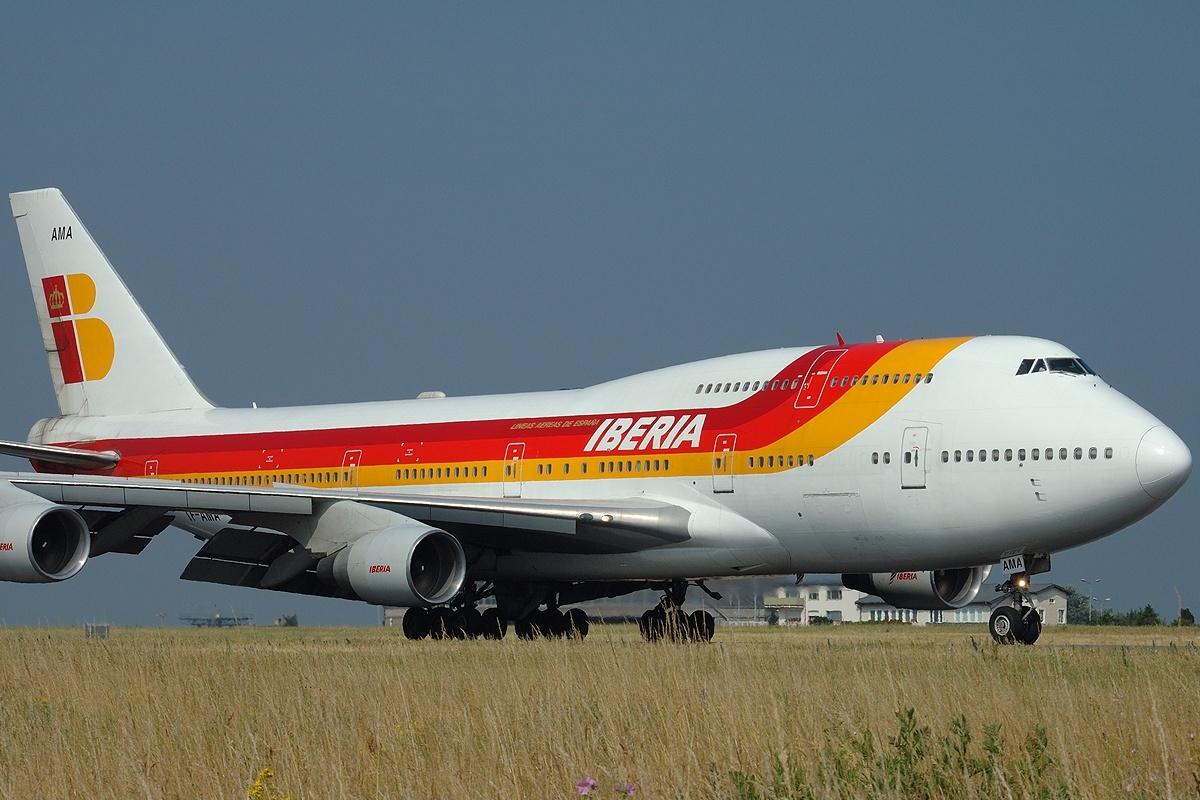
A Boeing 747-412 in Luxembourg Airport in June 2005

=== Early years ===
Iberia, Compañía Aérea de Transportes, was incorporated on 28 June 1927 with a capital investment of 1.1 million pesetas by financier Horacio Echevarrieta and Deutsche Luft Hansa. Flight operations commenced on 14 December 1927. The Spanish government contracted the company to provide postal transport between Madrid and Barcelona. During Miguel Primo de Rivera's dictatorship, Spanish aviation companies were amalgamated and became state-controlled as a general interest public utility, starting early 1928. Consequently, Iberia was merged into CLASSA (Compañía de Líneas Aéreas Subvencionadas S.A.), ceasing independent operations on 29 May 1929. Although the airline had neither a fleet nor commercial operations under its brand, the name 'Iberia' remained registered.

In 1937, during the Spanish Civil War, Spanish navy captain and director-general of the company Daniel de Araoz y Aréjula received the order from General Alfredo Kindelán to organize an airline for the air transport in nationalist-held territory during the war. Daniel de Araoz y Aréjula traveled to Germany to get support and material for the restoration of the company as an independent airline, thus six Junkers Ju 52 from Deutsche Luft Hansa arrived, which were acquired by Iberia at the end of the conflict, in addition to material to help the operations. As the name "Iberia" was still registered, it was used when operations began in 1937 towards the end of the war. During the conflict Iberia was a purely domestic airline, with headquarters in Salamanca the airline operated flights to cities in the nationalist side, Spanish North Africa, Spanish West Africa and Morocco. After the war, at the end of the 1930s, the airline served the Seville–Larache–Cape Juby–Las Palmas, Barcelona–Zaragoza–Burgos–Salamanca–Seville–Tetuan and La Palma–Barcelona–Vitoria runs using Junkers Ju 52 aircraft. On 1 May 1939, Iberia operated its first regular service to an international destination as an independent civil airline with a Madrid–Lisbon flight.

In 1940, the government gave the monopoly of national air transport to Iberia (this fact changed 6 years later when the government liberalised the national air traffic for the private airlines), This privilege helped the company to start building as an important international airline, which had not been until then. The airline was nationalised on 30 September 1944 and became part of Instituto Nacional de Industria. The policy of the company was to separate itself from the German orbit to which it had been linked in its first years and establish relations with the United States in terms of aircraft purchase and supplies of aeronautical material for the operation. Thus, that year the purchase of seven DC-3 and three DC-4 was finalised, to expand the network in Europe and accomplish the company's first transatlantic flight. This was achieved in 1946, Iberia was the first airline to fly between Europe and South America after World War II, using a Douglas DC-4 to operate flights between Madrid and Buenos Aires. This flight was the first of an expansion of flights between Latin America and Europe through Spain carried out by the company, with destinations such as San Juan de Puerto Rico, Caracas, Ciudad de México and La Habana. The poor diplomatic relations of the Francoist regime delayed the establishment of some destinations until the beginning of the 1950s.

Iberia incorporated four more DC-4s into its fleet during the first half of 1950, enabling both the strengthening of current services and the launch of new ones. With the Pact of Madrid in 1953, visa requirements were eliminated for US visitors to Spain. This stimulated the start of transatlantic flights between Spain and the United States the following year. The airline phased in the first of three Super Constellations in June 1954. The aircraft was named Santa María to commemorate Columbus' first voyage and was deployed in the inauguration of the new Madrid–New York service two months later, on 3 August 1954, the same day that Columbus left the port of Palos de la Frontera. The amendments to Article 6 of the Convention on International Civil Aviation of 14 June 1954 made in Paris on 30 June 1956 about non-scheduled air services enabled mass tourism using chartered aircraft since allowing European member states to carry out this type of operation with international flights between their territories. This favoured the airline given that it had in its territory several highly sought after destinations, mainly those on the eastern and southern Mediterranean coast and in the Balearic and Canary Islands, highly demanded by seaside tourism which began with this type of operation.

In 1959, the Spanish airline Aviaco became a part of Iberia by controlling two-thirds of its capital in a capital increase. Aviaco had been created in 1948, after the national air traffic had been liberalised for Spanish private companies in 1946.

In 1961, Iberia had 9 Super Constellations in the fleet, that year came into service the first DC-8-50, the four-engined jet airliner was progressively incorporated until reaching the number of 8 aircraft of the 50 series variant. Iberia was gradually incorporating jets of short and middle range, such as Sud Aviation Caravelle, and Douglas DC-9. The Super Constellations were removed and sold in 1966, and two years later, three DC-8-63 with more seat capacity were incorporated into the fleet. By 1969, the long-range fleet of Iberia was composed of 11 DC-8s. In the early 1970s, the jumbo jets Boeing 747s and Douglas DC-10s came to the company during an expansion of the intercontinental routes, especially to Central America. By the middle of this decade, the airline flew to almost all Latin American capitals. With the expansion in Latin America the company had followed a policy of purchasing shares and establishing agreements with several Latin American airlines such as Compañia Dominicana de Aviación, Aérolíneas Peruanas, PLUNA and Air Panamá Internacional. At first, the intention of this policy could be to create a strong distribution network for intercontinental routes passengers, but as the airline was controlled by the state the Franco regime used this investment policy to get support in Latin America. Iberia gave material, capital and logistical support to those flag-carrier airlines. By 1971, these investments resulted in the loss of 14 million dollars. Iberia also bought the short-middle range trijet Boeing 727-200 in 1971, of which the company had 35 aircraft and was used until 2001 like the other short-range jet bought by the company in the late '60s, the Douglas DC-9.

In 1987, Iberia, together with Lufthansa, Air France and SAS Group, founded Amadeus, an IT company (also known as a Global Distribution System) that would enable travel agencies to sell the founders and other airlines' products from a single system. In the same year, Iberia planned a fleet renewal in the middle-range fleet with the McDonnell Douglas MD-87 and Airbus A320 replacing the Douglas DC-9 and Boeing 727 respectively. In June 1990, the carrier bought 16 Boeing 757s for US$1 billion, including spares and training; twelve more aircraft of the type were taken on option as a part of the deal.

=== Development since the 1990s ===
In the 1990s, Iberia followed a policy of buying shares of Latin American flag carriers. It intended to dominate the entire Latin American market and become one of the largest airlines on the worldwide scene.

The investments started in June 1990 with the buying of a 30% stake in Aerolíneas Argentinas. In 1991, Iberia bought a 45% stake in Viasa for $81 million and a 35% stake in Chilean Ladeco. The airline continued making progress in setting up Europe's first international airline frequent-flyer programme in 1991, with the creation of Iberia Plus.

In 1994, the poor results of Aerolineas Argentinas, which presented a positive balance in its commercial exploitation but hid a significant deficit with losses in non-operating activities, led Iberia to increase its ownership participation to 85%. With this increase in participation, the Argentine state renounced its "golden share", allowing Iberia to have full fiscal control of the company. Iberia began a reduction in the size of the company, a liquidation of the national and overseas offices, and the technical sale of its entire fleet composed of 28 aircraft in a "sale and lease back" operation. Argentine sources indicate that the purchase capital of Aerolíneas Argentinas was charged to its financial liability. This, together with the aforementioned sales, generated a big controversy, giving rise to criticism of the Argentine government for the privatisation of the company. The truth is that during the period that Aerolíneas Argentinas was owned by Iberia (1990–1995), the Spanish airline allocated more than 1,200 million dollars to the Argentine flag carrier and kept the airline operating despite the poor results. Meanwhile, the Argentine government refused to invest more capital and expressed its desire to get rid of a large part of its shares. Iberia carried out major reforms in the structure of the company, which by that date was outdated with, among other things, extortionate personnel costs. Some of these changes included the development of a free booking program, the complete computerisation of the management system, the introduction of business class on domestic flights, and the creation of a new hub in Ezeiza International Airport for long range regional flights to Latin American destinations. In 1995, before the process of privatisation of Iberia, Aerolineas Argentinas was transferred to the Spanish government through INI, which would later become SEPI. In 2001, the Argentine flag carrier was sold to the Spanish company Grupo Marsans.

In 2008, the president of Argentina Cristina Fernández de Kirchner expropriated the company from Grupo Marsans for the symbolic price of 1 Argentine peso ($0.57) and renationalised the airline. In July 2017, the ICSID ordered Argentina to pay 320 million dollars to Grupo Marsans for having paid a lower price than the real value of the company. On 7 April 2010, the president of the Spanish Court of Auditors presented at the Spanish Parliament the figures of the investment in Aerolíneas Argentinas between 1990 and 2001, which was estimated at €2,100 million.

The plans to make the Iberia group the dominant airline in the Latin American market also failed in Venezuela. In 1997, the board of directors of Viasa, in which Iberia was the majority, decided to suspend the flights of the company, arguing that the situation was unfeasible. Iberia announcing that the company was not going to continue providing more capital into Viasa if its local partner, the Venezuelan state-owned group FIV, was not going to do the same. By then Iberia had invested more than 250 million dollars in the Venezuelan flag carrier without having any profit. In February 1997, the agreement for the liquidation of Viasa that accumulated a 200 million dollar debt, with a capital of only 2 million dollars, was announced. Iberia and the Venezuelan government had the intention of liquidating the company to avoid bankruptcy. Iberia offered to write off the 150 million dollar debt that Viasa had accumulated to the Spanish carrier in exchange for keeping its fleet of four DC-10s and five Boeing 727s. The agreement included compensation for the staff after the liquidation, which had a cost of 20 million dollars.

Regarding Ladeco, Iberia was a minority shareholder (35%) and did not intervene in its management. Initially, Iberia had the intention of achieving the merger of Ladeco with LAN Chile, but Chilean antitrust laws prevented it. Later, in 1995, LAN Chile made a major acquisition of Ladeco shares and acquired 57.6% of the company, this operation was approved by the Chilean antitrust prosecution, and then began a merger process in which Iberia lost some rights acquired during its time as shareholder of Ladeco. In 1997, Iberia sold its shares in Ladeco.

In 1996, the airline launched its website.

The company ordered 76 aircraft from Airbus in February 1998, which at the time was the largest single Airbus order. The following year it bought Aviaco and inherited that airline's fleet.

By the end of the '90s, Iberia owned as majority shareholder the Spanish airlines Aviaco, Viva Air, Binter Canarias and Binter Mediterraneo, and Latin American airlines Aerolíneas Argentinas, Austral, Viasa and Ladeco.

During 2001, Iberia was privatised and its shares were listed on stock exchanges. By 2002, when Iberia celebrated its 75th anniversary, it had carried nearly 500 million people in its history. In July 2004, Iberia announced it had decided to move its Latin American hub from Miami, Florida to San Pedro Sula, Honduras.

On 5 February 2006, Terminal 4 at Madrid - Barajas Airport was turned over to Iberia and fellow Oneworld alliance members. This provided much-needed expansion capabilities for Iberia. Iberia represents around 60% of the airport's traffic. In 2005, the airline and its regional branch Air Nostrum transported 21,619,041 passengers via Madrid – Barajas Airport.

In November 2006, Iberia launched Clickair, a low-cost carrier subsidiary. Clickair merged with Vueling in 2009.

On 12 November 2009, Iberia confirmed that it had reached a preliminary agreement to merge with British Airways. The merger between the two carriers would create the world's third-largest airline in terms of revenue. On 8 April 2010, it was confirmed that British Airways and Iberia had agreed to a merger, forming the International Airlines Group, although each airline would continue to operate under its current brand.

In November 2012, Iberia announced plans to reduce the number of employees by 4,500 and its fleet by five long-haul and 20 short-haul aircraft.

In 2012, Iberia established another low-cost airline, Iberia Express, which operates short and medium-haul routes from its parent airline's Madrid hub, providing feeder flights onto Iberia's long-haul network. The airline began operating on 25 March 2012 and shares its head office with Iberia in Chamartín, Madrid. In 2013, the headquarters of both airlines were moved to a new office in Ciudad Lineal, Madrid, and the corporate images have been changed as part of the renewal process.

In 2023, Iberia announced its return to Tokyo's Narita International Airport in October 2024 following its withdrawal in 2020 during the COVID-19 pandemic. Iberia first started flights to Tokyo in 1986, and began nonstop flying in 1992, but had previously suspended flights between 1998 and 2016.

== Corporate affairs ==
=== Business trends ===
The key trends for Iberia are (as of the financial year ending 31 December):

Year	Revenue (€ bn)	Net profit (€ m)	Number of employees	Number of passengers (m)	Passenger load factor (%)	Fleet size	References
2011	4.4	−27	20,081	17.3	81.3	103	
2012	4.6	−598	19,811	14.8	81.5	111	
2013	4.1	−493	18,254	10.6	79.2	95	
2014	4.1	391	16,907	10.7	78.6	96	
2015	4.5	472	16,177	16.5	81.1	98	
2016	4.4	153	15,809	17.8	82.0	98	
2017	4.7	137	15,738	18.7	84.1	100	
2018	5.4	245	16,180	20.9	85.7	107	
2019	5.6	342	16,776	22.5	87.0	114	
2020	2.2	−2,148	9,817	5.8	70.5	113	
2021	2.7	−704	11,491	10.5	68.9	100	
2022	5.5	272	15,499		84.1	111	
2023	7.1	1,001	16,937		87.1	121	
2024	7.8	750	17,735		88.1	120	
2025	8.2	959	17,690		88.5	129	

=== Head office ===
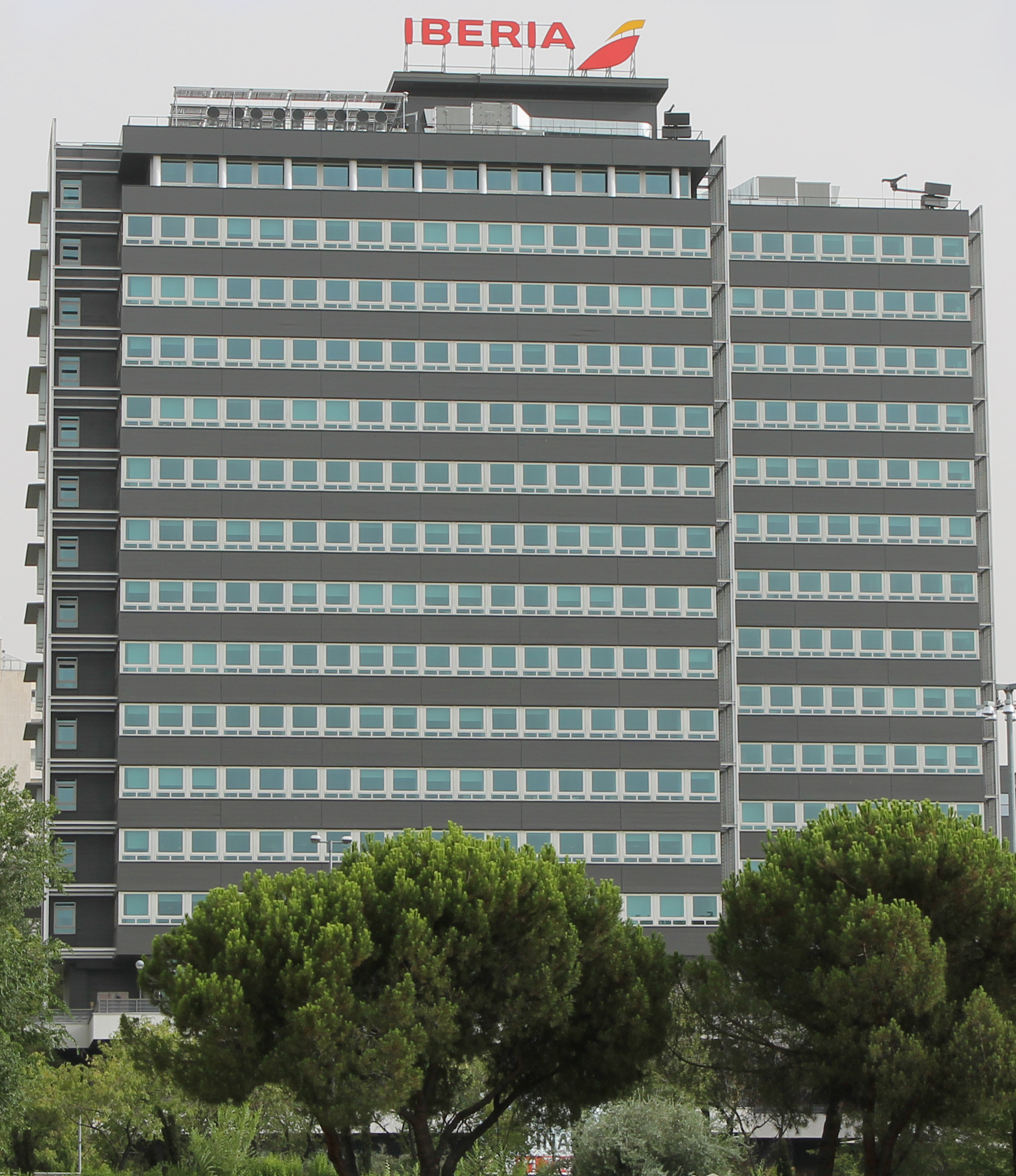
Head office

The company head office is in the MV49 Business Park in Madrid. This facility is in proximity to the intersection of the Autopista de Circunvalación M-30 and Avenida de América. In 2013, the company moved its head office from the former Campos Velázquez, in the Salamanca district of Madrid, to save money.

=== Ownership ===
Former Iberia logo; used from 1977 to 2013

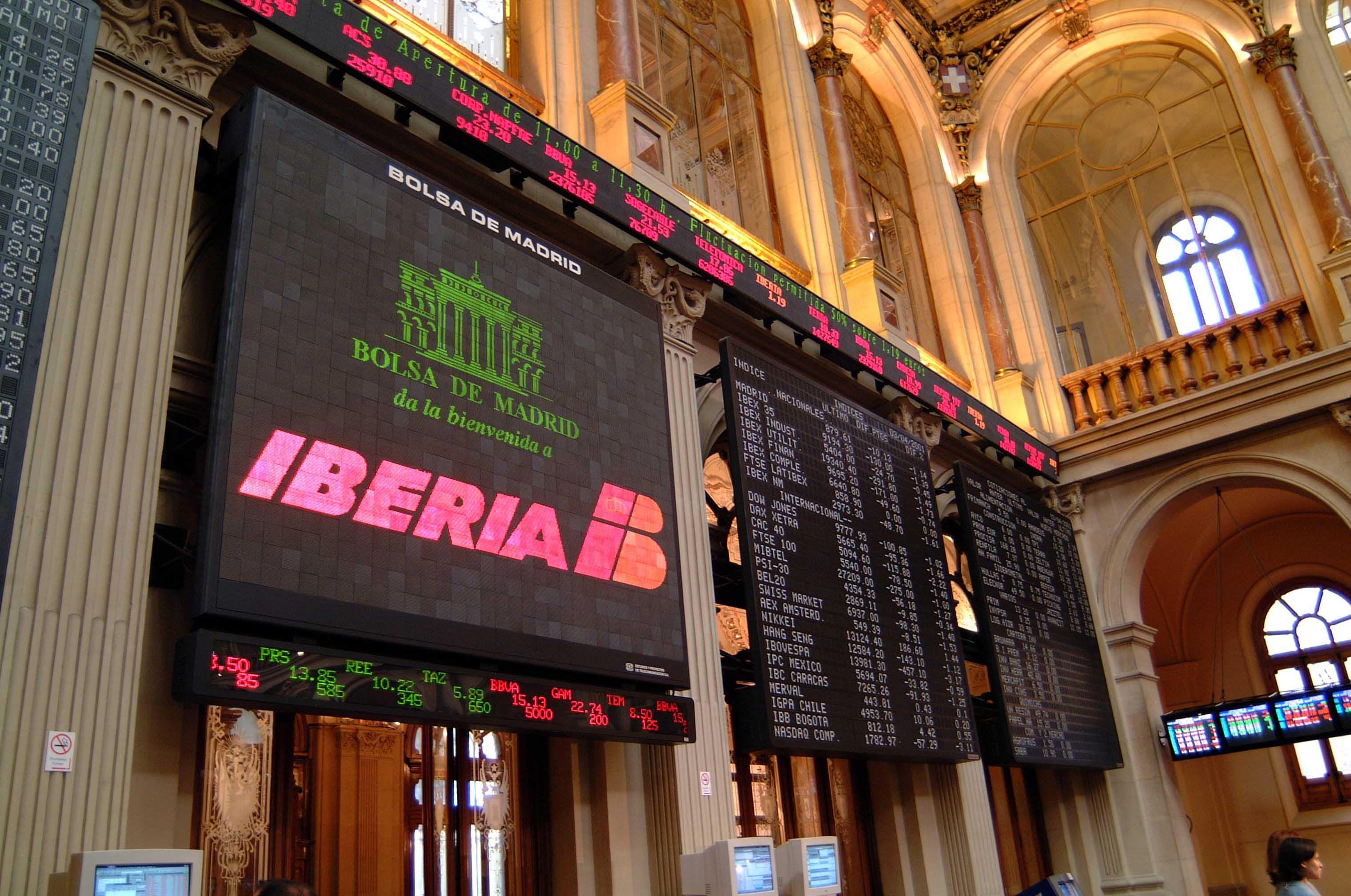
Announcement of the listing of Iberia in the Madrid Stock Exchange, 2001

On 3 April 2001, Iberia was privatised and included in the IBEX 35 stock index of the Madrid stock exchange. The core shareholders were: Caja Madrid– 23.45%, British Airways 13.2%, SEPI– 5.20%, El Corte Inglés– 2.90%. British Airways raised its stake in Iberia by purchasing American Airlines' remaining shares, reportedly paying £13m for the small shareholding. This increased BA's total stake in Iberia to around 10% and preserved its two seats on the Iberia board.

In July 2008, British Airways and Iberia announced plans to merge, wherein each airline would retain its original brand. The agreement was confirmed in April 2010, and in July, the European Commission and United States Department of Transportation permitted the merger and the two airlines began to co-ordinate transatlantic routes with American Airlines. On 6 October 2010, the alliance between British Airways, American Airlines and Iberia formally began operations. At the time it was estimated the alliance would generate an estimated £230 million in annual cost-saving for BA, in addition to the £330 million which would be saved by the merger with Iberia. The merger was finalised on 21 January 2011, resulting in the International Airlines Group (IAG), the world's third-largest airline in terms of annual revenue and the second-largest airline group in Europe.

Prior to merging, British Airways owned a 13.5% stake in Iberia, and thus received ownership of 55% of the combined International Airlines Group; Iberia's other shareholders received the remaining 45%.

The merger has been controversial. British Airways operates two funded principal-defined benefit pension schemes in the UK. British Airways admits that one of the most serious financial risks it suffers is the challenging pension schemes' combined deficit. The last actuarial valuation was £3.7 billion, a value even greater than IAG's capitalisation. In addition and according to the "Pensions Act" for the year 2004, should it be necessary, the United Kingdom's Pension Regulator could force Iberia or IAG to give additional financial support to British Airways' retirement pension schemes. In its "Annual Report and Accounts Year ended 31 December 2011" BA declared that "negative movements in pension asset values and financial returns from these assets may increase the size of the pension deficit".

As of December 2013, the airline had over 18,000 employees.

Due to Brexit, Iberia has been forced to prove that it is still a Spanish airline, despite being merged with British Airways. The consequence for not doing so is their potential inability to fly within the European Union.

=== Subsidiaries and alliances ===
Iberia has a 9.49% stake in low-cost carrier Vueling which is based near Barcelona, with parent company IAG owning the remaining 90.51%. This was done to ensure that IAG does not have 100% of the shares in Vueling, but that the shares are split between its divisions. Iberia also has a 0.95% share in Royal Air Maroc.

Iberia is allied with American Airlines, Qantas, Avianca and British Airways, and it was allied with Grupo TACA. On 1 September 1999, the company joined the Oneworld alliance.

Iberia formerly owned Aviaco, which operated most domestic routes. It was founded on 18 February 1948 and operated until 1 September 1999. Iberia also owned Binter Canarias, until the Spanish government began the privatisation of the subsidiary. Hesperia Inversiones Aéreas bought the airline from Iberia in July 2002. A second airline using the Binter name, Binter Mediterraneo, was formed as a subsidiary of Iberia in 1988 with routes from Melilla to Málaga, Almeria, Valencia and in its last year, with Madrid. The airline was acquired by Air Nostrum in 1998 and merged into its operations, at that time, the airline had a fleet of CN-235s.

Iberia was a founding partner in the computerised air ticket reservation system, Amadeus, with an 18.28% stake. Iberia is also active as a tour operator through its Viva Tours and Tiempo Libre units, and with Cacesa, it supplies parcel shipment services.

In addition, Iberia is an aircraft maintenance company, servicing its fleet and those of another 48 companies, including some leading European airlines. Iberia is a supplier of aircraft handling services at all Spanish airports and two in Equatorial Guinea; its airline clients number more than 200 and has 7300 employees.

== Destinations ==
=== Joint businesses ===
Iberia participates in a joint business with Qatar Airways and British Airways which includes the operation of three daily flights between Qatar Airways' Doha hub and Madrid along with up to 10 flights between Doha and London.

Iberia also participates in the Oneworld transatlantic joint venture with American Airlines, British Airways and Finnair.

=== Codeshare agreements ===
As of May 2024, Iberia has codeshare agreements with the following airlines:

- Aer Lingus
- airBaltic
- American Airlines
- Avianca
- Binter Canarias
- British Airways
- Boliviana de Aviación
- Bulgaria Air
- Cathay Pacific
- Copa Airlines
- El Al
- Evelop Airlines
- Finnair
- Japan Airlines
- LATAM Brasil
- LATAM Chile
- LATAM Ecuador
- Pegasus Airlines
- Qatar Airways
- Royal Air Maroc
- Royal Jordanian
- TAAG Angola Airlines
- Viva
- Volaris
- Vueling
- Widerøe

== Fleet ==
=== Current fleet ===
Iberia Airbus A320neo

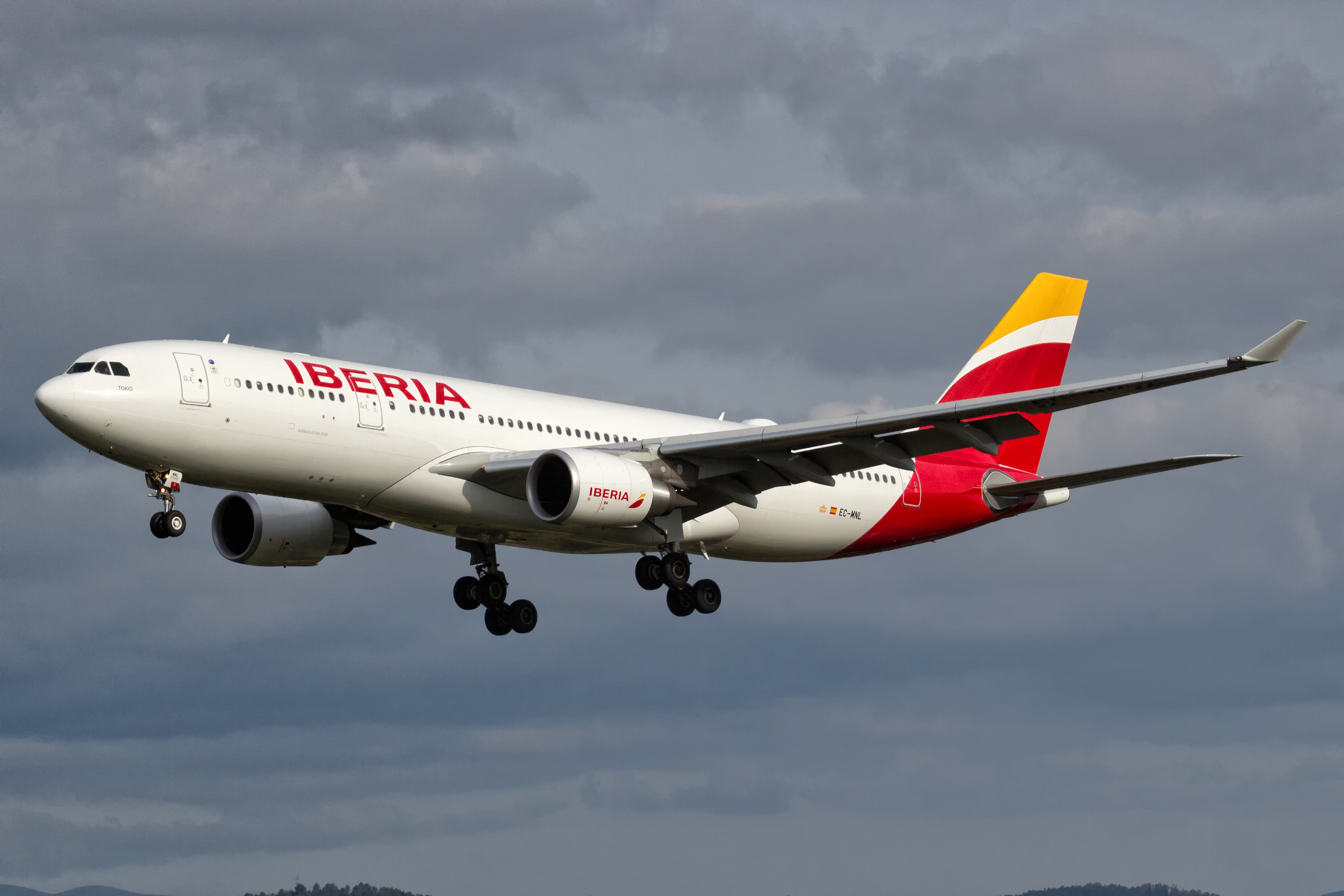
Iberia Airbus A330-200

As of December 2025, Iberia operates an all-Airbus fleet composed of the following aircraft:

Iberia fleet
Aircraft	In service	Orders	Passengers				Notes
Aircraft	In service	Orders	J	W	Y	Total	Notes
Airbus A319-100	3	—	—	—	141	141	
Airbus A320-200	11	—	—	—	180	180	
Airbus A320neo	21	8	—	—	186	186	
Airbus A321-200	14	—	—	—	217	217	
Airbus A321XLR	7	1	14	—	168	182	Launch customer.
Airbus A330-200	12	—	19	—	269	288	
Airbus A330-300	8	—	29	21	242	292	
Airbus A350-900	23	8	31	24	293	348	
Total	99	17					

=== Fleet development ===
In August 2015, Iberia parent International Airlines Group converted eight Airbus A350-900 and three Airbus A330-200 options into firm orders for Iberia. In June 2018, the airline took the delivery of its first A350.

In June 2017, Iberia ordered 17 Airbus A320neo and 3 Airbus A321neo aircraft with deliveries from 2018. The first A320neo was delivered in May 2018. The first A321neo was received by Iberia Express in June 2020.

At the 2019 Paris Air Show, IAG agreed to purchase 14 Airbus A321XLR aircraft, 8 for delivery to Iberia and 6 to Aer Lingus, with options for a further 14 of the aircraft. The first A321XLR was received by worldwide launch customer Iberia in November 2024.

On 28 July 2023, IAG converted six of the ten remaining options for the Boeing 787 into firm orders for the 787-10 and added six more options for the variant to be allocated to British Airways, and converted one option for the Airbus A350-900 into a firm order to be allocated to Iberia.

On 9 May 2025, IAG ordered up to 76 aircraft from Airbus and Boeing, out of which 32 firm orders and 10 options for the Boeing 787–10 will be allocated to British Airways, and 21 firm orders and 13 options for the Airbus A330-900 will be allocated to Iberia, Aer Lingus, and LEVEL. It also revealed the firming of options for 18 additional aircraft, including six Airbus A350-1000 aircraft and six Boeing 777–9 aircraft for British Airways, and six Airbus A350-900 aircraft for Iberia.

=== Former fleet ===
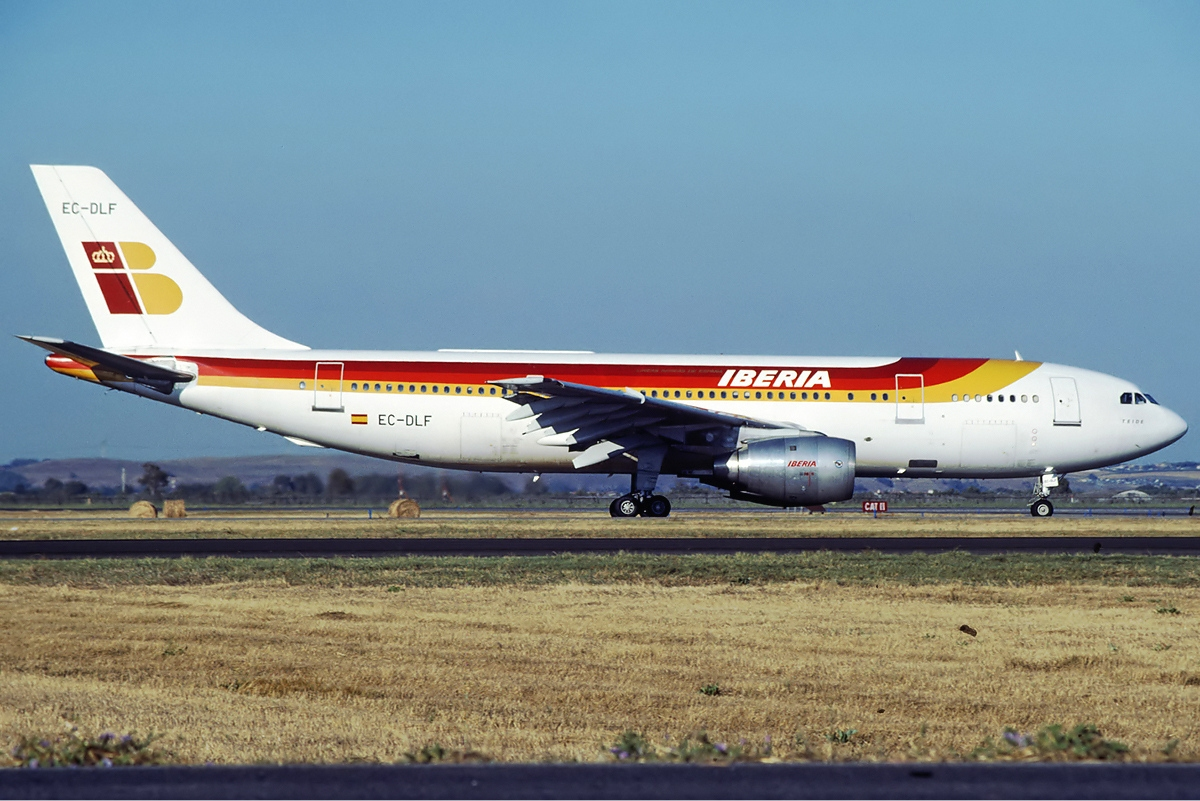
A former Iberia Airbus A300

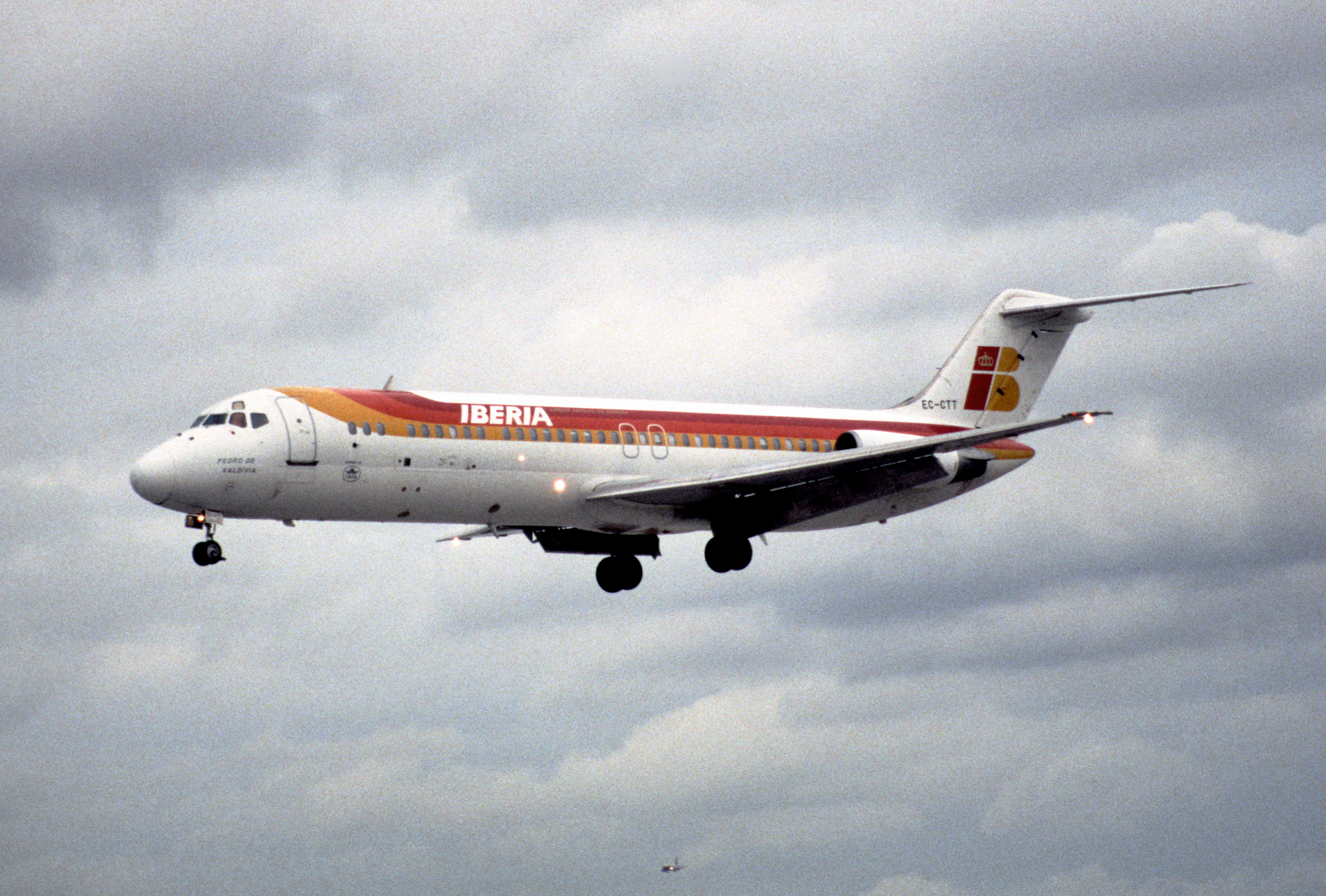
A former Iberia McDonnell Douglas DC-9

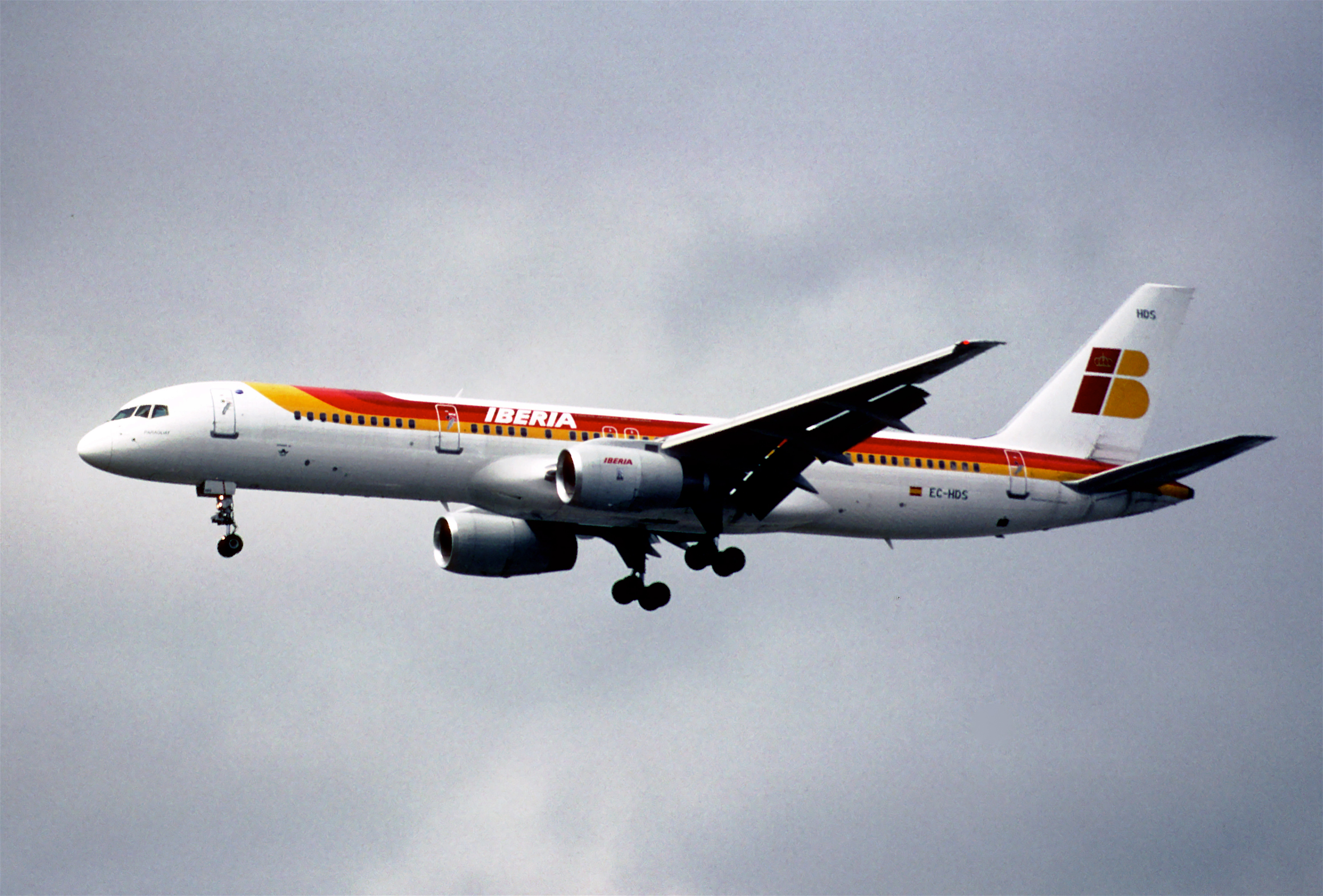
A former Iberia Boeing 757-200

Over the years, Iberia operated the following aircraft types:

Aircraft	Introduced	Retired
Airbus A300	1981	2002
Airbus A340-300	1996	2016
Airbus A340-600	2003	2020
Boeing 727–200	1972	2001
Boeing 737–300	1988	1990
Boeing 737–400	1998	2001
Boeing 747–100	1970	1981
Boeing 747–200	1972	2005
Boeing 747–300	2000	2005
Boeing 747-400	2004	2006
Boeing 757–200	1993	2008
Boeing 767–300	1998	2002
Bristol 170 Freighter Mk.31	1953	1963
Convair 440	1957	1972
de Havilland DH.89 Dragon Rapide	1934	1953
Dornier Do J Wal	1935	1936
Douglas DC-1	1938	1940
Douglas DC-2	1935	1946
Douglas DC-3	1944	1973
Douglas DC-4	1946	1968
Douglas DC-8	1961	1983
Douglas DC-9	1967	2001
Fokker F28 Fellowship	1970	1975
Ford Trimotor	1930	1946
Junkers G 24	1929	1936
Junkers Ju 52/3m	1937	1957
Lockheed L-1011 TriStar	1997	1998
Lockheed L-1049 Super Constellation	1954	1966
McDonnell Douglas DC-10	1973	2000
McDonnell Douglas MD-87	1990	2008
McDonnell Douglas MD-88	1999	2008
Rohrbach Ro-VIII Roland	1927	1929
SNCASE SE.161 Languedoc	1952	1960
Sud Aviation Caravelle	1962	1987

== Aircraft cabins ==
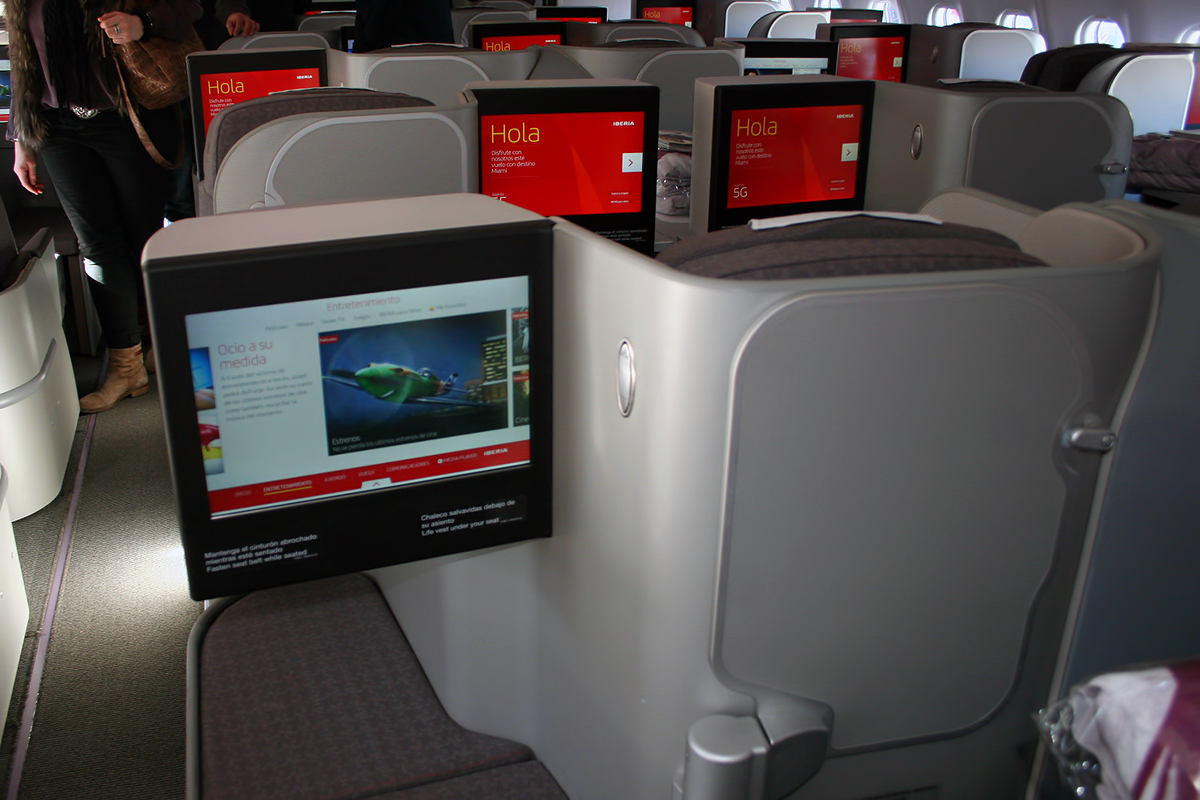
Iberia Business Plus class on board an Airbus A330-300

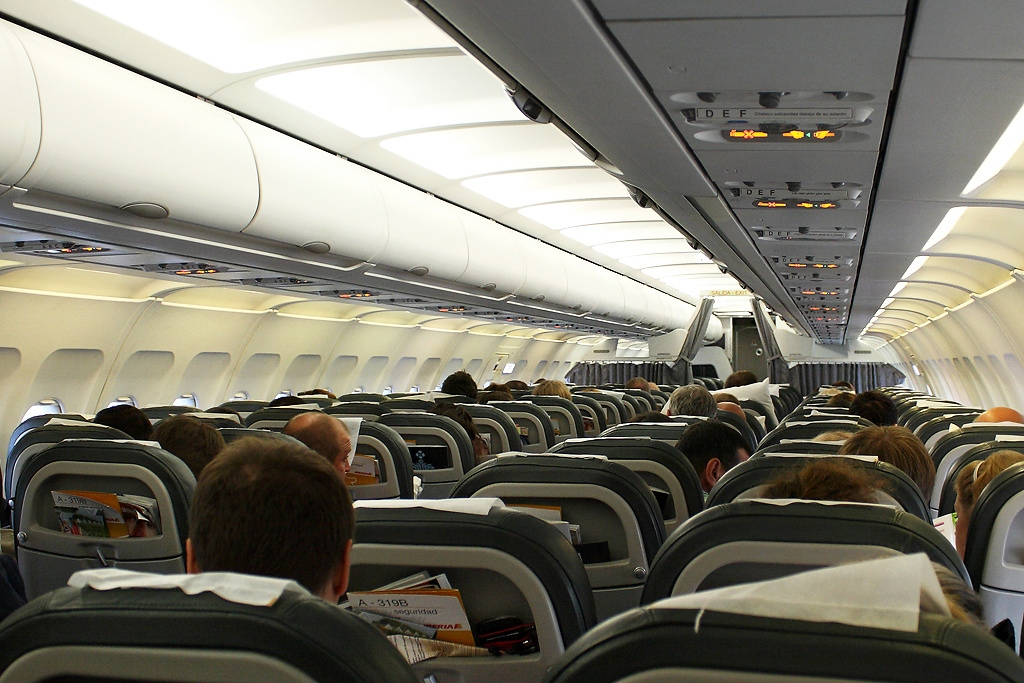
Iberia Economy class on board an Airbus A319-100

All aircraft in the fleet are configured in a two-class layout with Business and Economy cabins. Iberia currently markets three distinct business class variations, depending on flight length. In March 2009, Iberia announced that from 2009 to 2011, it would renovate its economy class on all its planes as well as design a new business class for its long-haul planes. Iberia was one of the last remaining major airlines to equip all of its intercontinental routes with personal entertainment screens. As of 2016, the Airbus A330-200 and −300, and A340-600 fleets are equipped with personal IFE. In-flight catering is provided by Do & Co.

Business Class

Business Class is available on Spanish domestic and inter-European flights. Seats are the same as in the economy cabin but with the middle (B and E) seats blocked off. Business Class tickets also include improved ground service (priority check-in, security, boarding, baggage handling, and lounge access).

Business Plus

Business Plus is offered on long-haul flights to the Americas and Southern Africa. Business Plus offers lie-flat seating and international business-class amenities.

Economy

Iberia has moved more to an American, or "a-la-carte" model for domestic and European flights, offering a buy on board service called "Tu Menú" in economy for meals, snacks and beverages. Mid-haul flights to Dakar, Moscow, and Tel Aviv as well as long-haul intercontinental flights are fully catered in Economy except alcohol.

== Accidents and incidents ==
As of January 2016, a total of 37 aircraft operated by or for Iberia have been written off in accidents and shoot-downs since 1939. Several Iberia aircraft have also been hijacked. These incidents and accidents include the following:

- On 19 April 1928, a Rohrbach Ro VIII Roland I with registration D-1219 made a hard landing near Ventas de Muniesa, 12 km north of Muniesa, Teruel which resulted in serious damage to the aircraft and caused injuries to the 11 occupants, one of them severely and later died. According to witnesses, there were foggy conditions in the area and the plane had given several low passes around the place before landing. The aircraft was flying from Barcelona to Madrid.
- During 1939, Iberia lost two trimotor Junkers Ju 52s. On 16 March, one crashed due to bad weather in Cabezavellosa on the regular flight from Salamanca to Seville. On 18 December, another Ju 52 crashed near Gibraltar on its flight from Tetuán to Seville. Rumors, initiated by the German secret service, suggested at the time that the aircraft was shot down from the Rock of Gibraltar or from an English warship. This was not deemed likely. Three crew and seven passengers were killed.
- On 4 October 1940, a Douglas DC-1 force landed in Málaga, Spain. All passengers and crew survived, but the aircraft was destroyed.
- On 23 December 1948, a Douglas DC-3 crashed in foggy and heavy rain conditions in risk of Sierra de Pandols near Bot killing all 27 occupants. After the collision, the fuselage disintegrated and the plane burst into flames following the resulting explosion. The plane fell into Puig Cabal's valley. The aircraft was found two and a half hours later.
- On 28 October 1957, an engine fire caused a Douglas DC-3 to crash near Getafe killing all 21 occupants.
- On 29 April 1959, a Douglas DC-3 crashed onto the Sierra de Valdemeca, Cuenca after being diverted due to bad weather with the loss of all 28 occupants.
- On 31 March 1965, a Convair 440-62, crashed into the sea on approach to Tangiers killing 50 of the 53 occupants. The aircraft stalled at low altitude.
- On 5 May 1965, Flight 401, a Lockheed Constellation, crashed at Los Rodeos Airport at Tenerife after hitting a scraper and tractor during a go-around in foggy conditions. Of 49 occupants, 30 passengers and six crew members were killed.
- On 4 November 1967, Flight 062 a Sud Aviation Caravelle crashed at Blackdown, West Sussex, United Kingdom killing all 37 passengers and crew on board.
- On 7 January 1972, Flight 602 crashed into Sa Talia hill in San Jose on approach to Ibiza Airport killing all 104 on board.
- On 5 March 1973, 68 people were killed in a mid-air collision above the French city of Nantes involving an Iberia Douglas DC-9 flying from Palma to London as Flight 504; and a Convair 990 Coronado aircraft, operating as Spantax Flight 400. The Spantax Convair 990 was able to make a successful emergency landing whilst the Iberia DC-9 crashed killing everyone on board. The accident occurred during a French air traffic controllers' strike.
- On 17 December 1973, Flight 933, an Iberia McDonnell Douglas DC-10 registered as EC-CBN, collided with an ALS system of the runway threshold upon landing at Boston Logan after a flight from Madrid Airport. There were no fatalities among the 168 people on board; however, the aircraft was written off.
- On 7 December 1983, Iberia Flight 350, a Boeing 727 (EC-CFJ), crashed while taking off in dense fog when it collided with Aviaco Flight 134, a Douglas DC-9 (EC-CGS) that had mistakenly taxied onto the runway at Madrid Airport. All on the Aviaco flight perished, and 51 (50 passengers, 1 crew member) of the 93 on board the Iberia flight were killed. Among the casualties was Mexican actress Fanny Cano.
- On 19 February 1985, Iberia Flight 610, a Boeing 727–200, crashed after hitting a television antenna installed on the summit of Monte Oiz while landing in Bilbao, killing 148 people.
- On 26 July 1996, Iberia Flight 6621, a McDonnell-Douglas DC-10-30 flying from Madrid to Havana was hijacked mid-flight. The hijacker, a Lebanese national named Ibrahim Saada, demanded the flight be diverted to Miami International Airport. No one was hurt and the aircraft later landed at José Martí International Airport some hours later. Saada was later apprehended and faced up to 20 years in prison.
- In 2001, Iberia Flight 1456 from Barcelona to Bilbao crashed on landing. There were no fatalities but the aircraft was damaged beyond repair.
- On 9 November 2007, Iberia Flight 6463, an Airbus A340-600, registration EC-JOH, was badly damaged at Quito, Ecuador after sliding off the runway at Old Mariscal Sucre International Airport. No injuries were reported. According to Airbus, the aircraft was written off.

== See also ==
- List of airlines of Spain
- List of companies of Spain
- Transport in Spain
