= Binter Mediterráneo =

Spanish regional airline, 1988–2001

IATA	ICAO	Call sign
AX	BIM	BINTER
- Founded: 2 September 1988
- Ceased operations: 29 August 2001
- Hubs: Málaga Airport
- Headquarters: Málaga, Spain

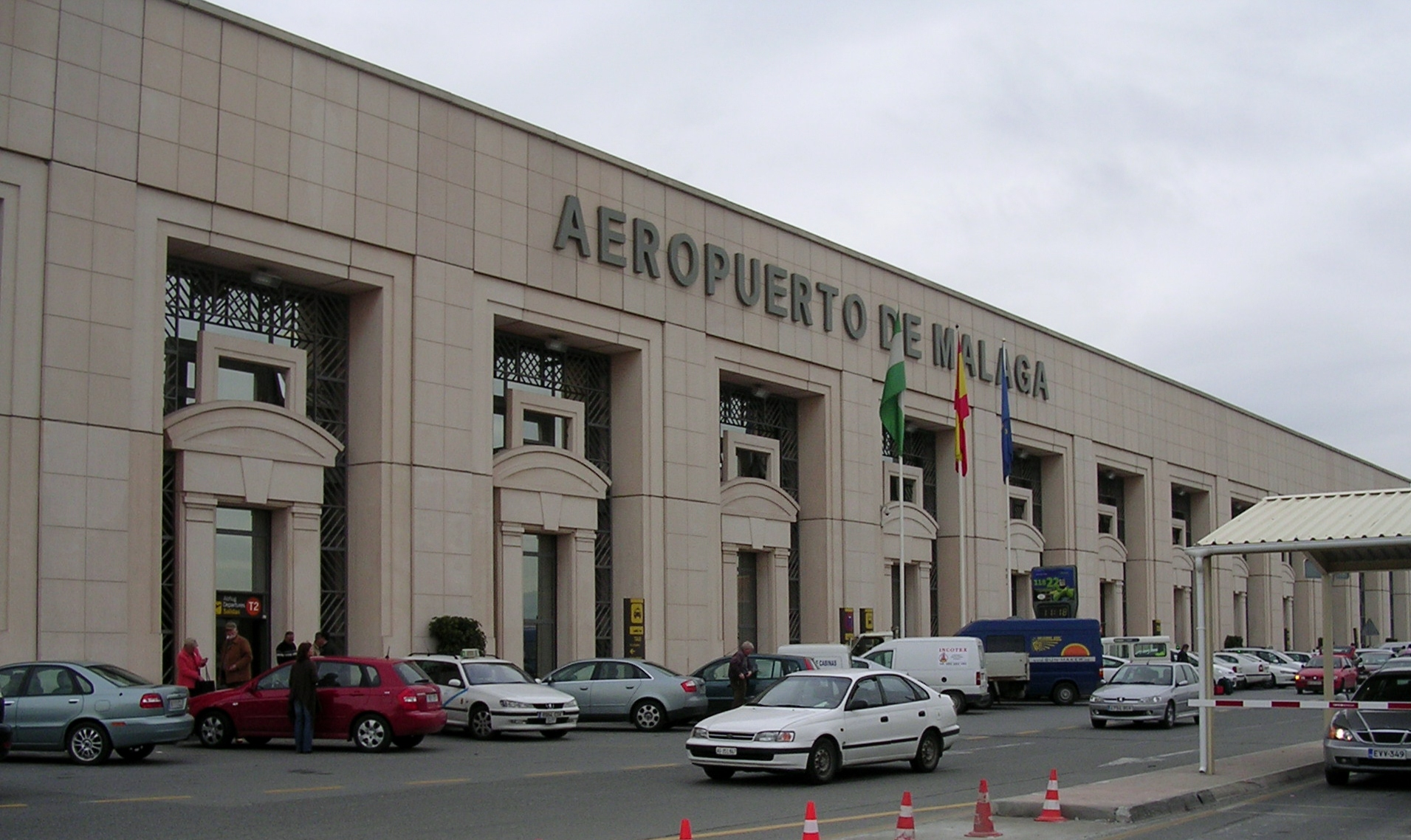
Málaga Airport, where Binter's head office was located

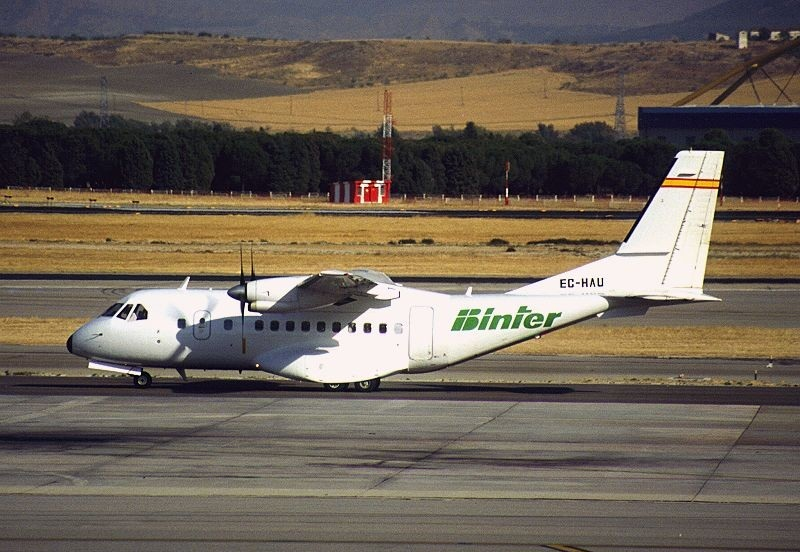
Binter Mediterráneo CN-235.

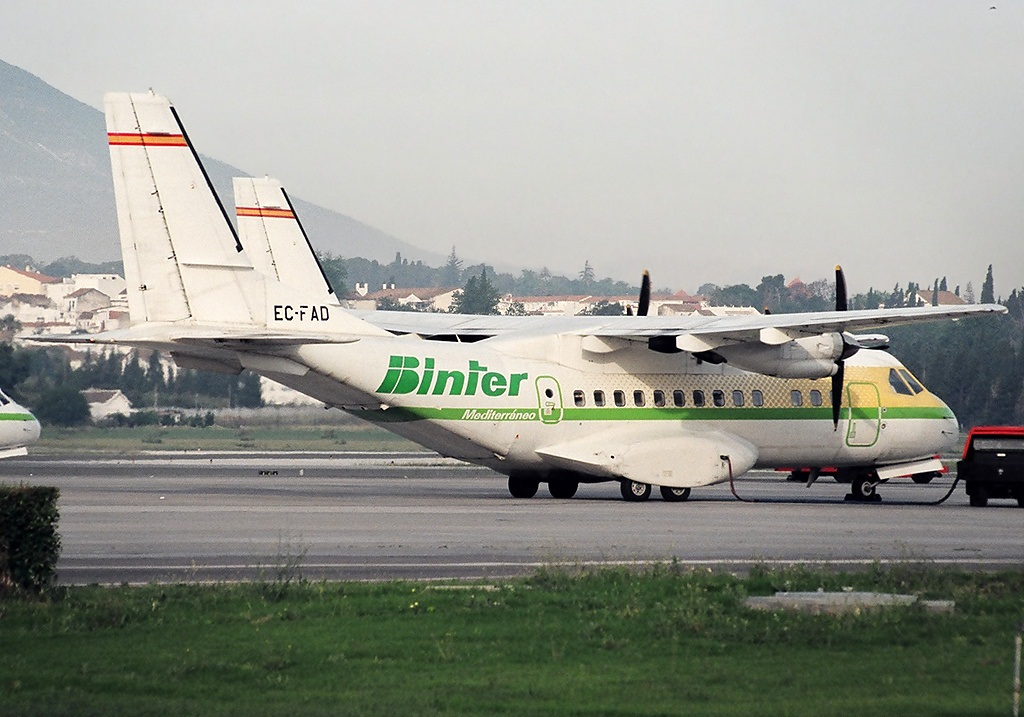
Binter Mediterráneo CN-235 in Malaga, Spain.

Binter Mediterráneo was a Spanish airline with its head office in the Domestic Departures area of Málaga Airport in Málaga, Spain., the airline was created in 1988 in the likeness of Binter Canarias, another a subsidiary of Iberia LAE. Binter Mediterráneo was based in Madrid and operated a fleet that consisted of five CASA CN-235 aircraft.

Binter Mediterráneo linked the city of Melilla to Málaga, Almeria, Valencia and in its last year, with Madrid. Binter ceased operations after one of its planes crashed on 29 August 2001 in the vicinity of Málaga airport while performing the Melilla-Malaga route. It was sold by Iberia in June 2001 to its franchise Air Nostrum, owned by Nefinsa .

Air Nostrum, an independent Iberia franchise operator, acquired Binter Mediterráneo in 2001 and absorbed its operations. It replaced the remaining CN-235s with ATR-72s.

== Incidents ==
On 29 August 2001 Binter Mediterráneo Flight 8261 (registration EC-FBC) crash-landed next to N-340, some 200 meters short of the runway 32 at Málaga Airport at Málaga, Spain. The pilot reported to Málaga Air Traffic Control, while on final approach, the aircraft's left engine had failed, and that he would have to perform an emergency landing. The plane descended, hitting the first edge lights and stopping right next to the N-340. Subsequent investigation into the accident revealed that, shortly after the initial engine failure, the First Officer inadvertently shut down both of the aircraft's engines, leading to a total loss of power. Four out of the 44 people on board were killed, including the pilot Capt. Fdez. Ruano. The aircraft was scrapped.

== See also ==
- Binter Mediterráneo Flight 8261
- Binter Canarias - sister airline
