= Binter Mediterráneo Flight 8261 =

2001 aviation accident in Spain

Coordinates: 36°40′30″N 004°29′57″W

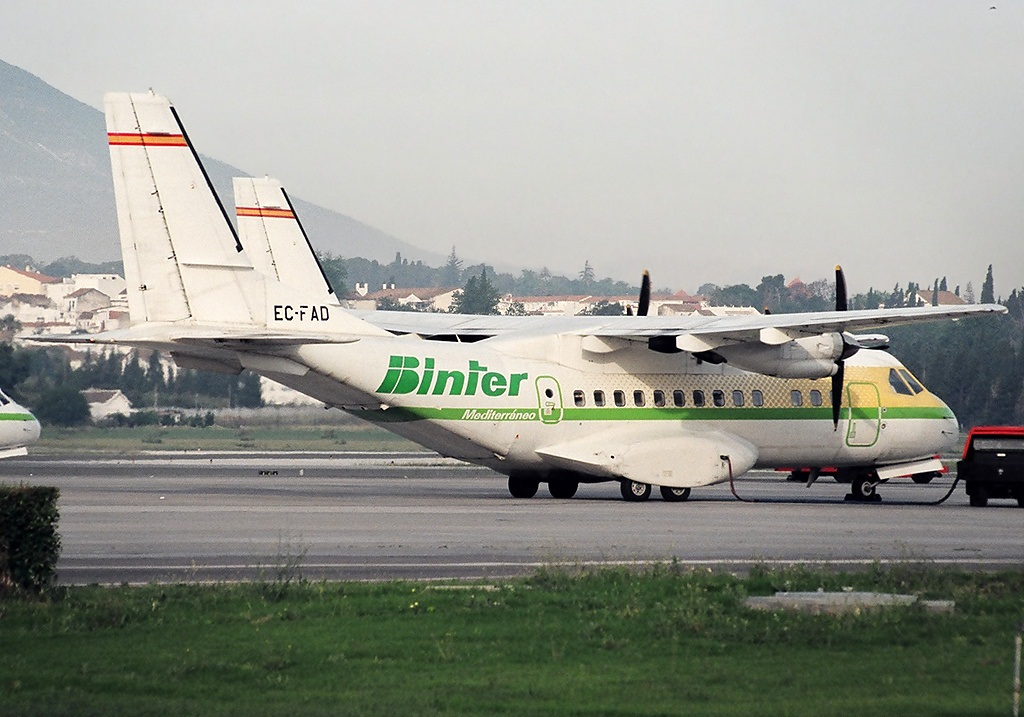
- A Binter Mediterráneo aircraft similar to the accident aircraft

Accident
- Date: 29 August 2001
- Summary: Forced landing
- Site: N-340 highway near Ruiz Picasso International Airport, Málaga, Spain

Aircraft
- Aircraft type: CASA CN-235
- Operator: Binter Mediterráneo
- IATA flight No.: AX8261
- ICAO flight No.: BIM8261
- Call sign: BINTER 8261
- Registration: EC-FBC
- Flight origin: Melilla Airport, Melilla, Spain
- Destination: Ruiz Picasso International Airport, Málaga, Spain
- Occupants: 47
- Passengers: 44
- Crew: 3
- Fatalities: 4
- Injuries: 26
- Survivors: 43

Binter Mediterráneo Flight 8261 on 29 August 2001, is a crash that landed next to the N-340 highway, some 200 meters short of runway 32 at Ruiz Picasso International Airport at Málaga, Spain. The captain reported a fire in the aircraft's port engine to Málaga Air Traffic Control while on final approach. The fire turned out to be a false alarm but, in following the emergency procedures, the First Officer inadvertently shut down both of the aircraft's engines. The plane descended, hitting the airport approach lights, and stopping next to the N-340.

Four of the 47 people on board were killed, including the captain. The aircraft was scrapped.

== Take-off and flight ==
Binter Mediterráneo Flight 8261 took off at the Melilla Airport at 09:37 CEST on 29 August 2001, with 47 people on board (44 passengers and 3 crew). The weather was fine.

== Attempted landing ==
During the approach to runway 32 at Málaga, a warning light in the cockpit indicated a fire in the port engine. In fact, it was a false alarm, possibly caused by moisture and/or dirt in the circuitry, though the crew did not know this. (Note: CIAIAC final report, synopsis: "El aviso de fuego resultó ser falso. [English: The fire warning turned out to be false.]") (Note: CIAIAC final report, section 3.2 "Causes", page 125 "La aparición del falso aviso de fuego pudo estar motivada por la presencia de humedad y/o suciedad en los conectores del circuito detector de fuego. [English: The appearance of the false fire warning can be caused by the presence of humidity and/or dirt in the connectors of the fire detector circuit.]") The captain continued the approach, while the co-pilot followed the emergency procedure for an engine fire. In the process, he erroneously activated the fire-handles for the right engine as well as the left, causing them both to stop. The plane landed some 500 m (1,600 ft) short of the runway threshold and came to rest against the embankment of the N-340 motorway. The pilot did not communicate any information about the emergency in progress to the cabin crew, and consequently passengers were not instructed to assume the brace position prior to impact.

Three passengers plus the pilot were killed in the accident.

== Causes ==
While the co-pilot's incorrect execution of the emergency procedure was the primary cause of the accident, the investigators learnt that he had not received any simulator training in emergency procedures from the airline.

The investigation also considered that incomplete adherence to relevant maintenance procedures was the most likely reason for the false fire alarm.

== Remains of plane ==
The remains of the plane were taken to the CASA Sevilla factory, for an investigation. Following completion of the investigation, the aircraft was scrapped. The tail was saved however, and is exhibited in the Malaga Aeronautical Museum.
