= Autovía A-48 =

Motorway in Spain

Autovía A-48
- Autovía Costa de la Luz
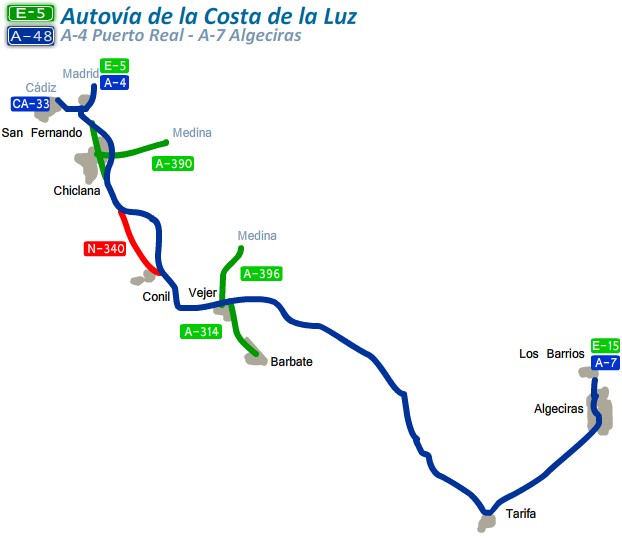

Route information
- Length: 105 km (65 mi)

Major junctions
- From: Cádiz
- To: Algeciras

Location
- Country: Spain

Highway system
- Highways in Spain; Autopistas and autovías; National Roads

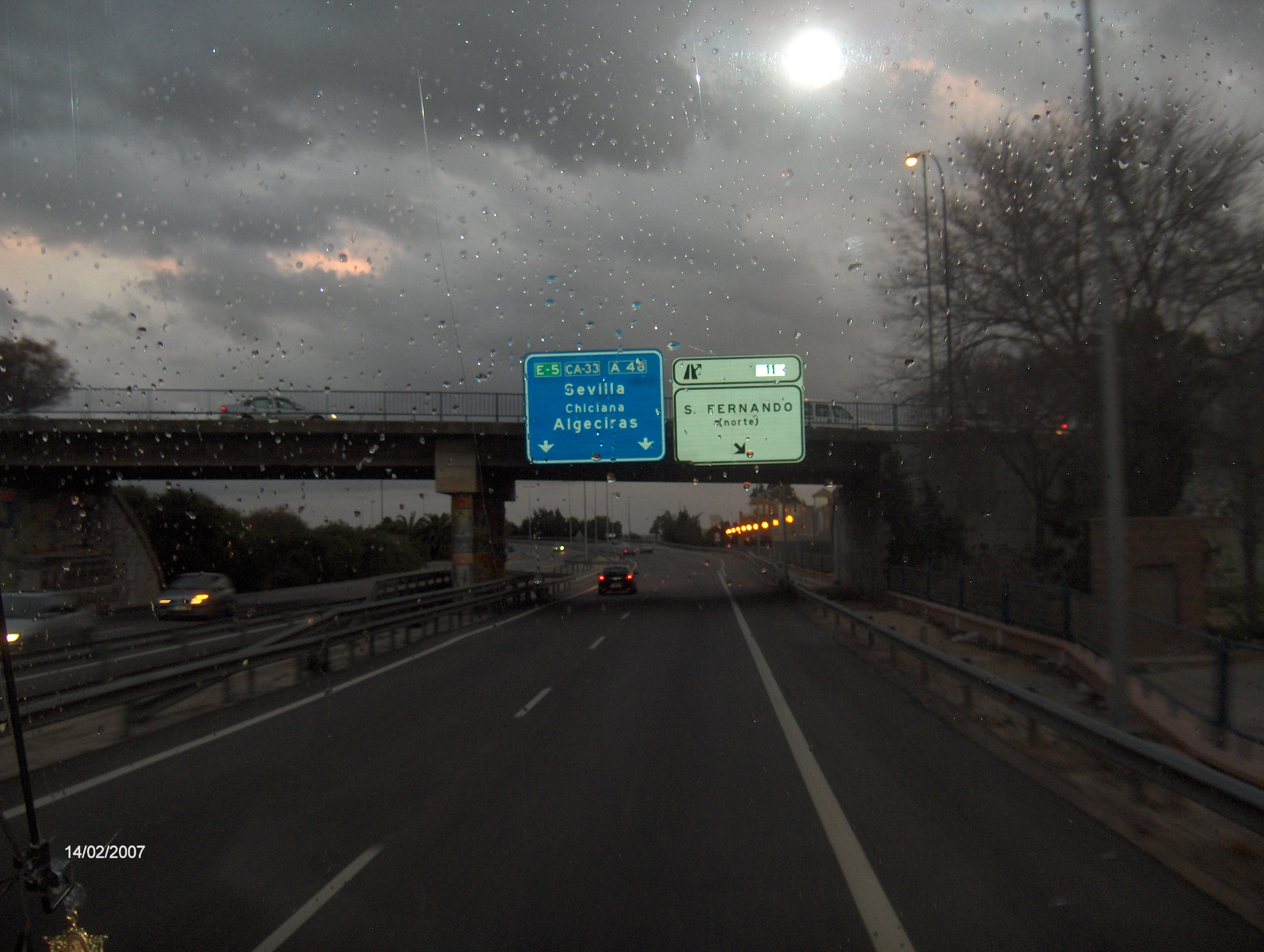
Autovía A-48

The Autovía A-48 is a highway in Andalucia, Spain.

It follows the route of the N-340 around the southern tip of Spain. It is currently under construction, and upon completion it will serve as a continuation of the Autovía A-7 from Algeciras, linking it to Cádiz (junction with Autopista AP-4 towards Madrid, Seville, and the border with Portugal).

The highway replaced the historic trail "La Trocha".
