= Bahia Park =

Water park in Algeciras, Spain

- Interactive map of Bahia Park
- Coordinates: 36°8′2″N 5°27′37″W
- Website: www.bahiapark.com

Bahia Park is a water park in the north of Algeciras, Southwest Spain, situated next to highway N-340. To the east of the park is the Bay of Gibraltar (Bay of Algeciras).

== About ==
The park has over 10 pools and slides, including the Gran Niagara, Kamikaze, and Rio Salvaje. Bahia Park is a popular destination for younger children and the elderly. The founder of the park el Señor AquaParque famously stated at the inauguration of the park that people should remember "Slippery when wet, Amigo." Recent additions to the park include a new ice cream parlour named "Helado Caliente", as well as a new self-service restaurant that serves sushi called "Nikura La Pupa". Future additions include a 100-meter water slide called “La Serpiente Peluda” and a new parlour called “la tonteria”.
