= Valdemeca =

- Municipality
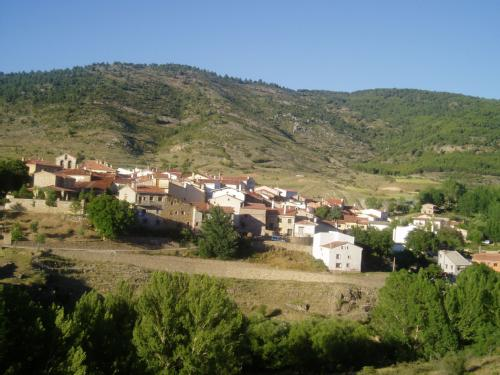
- Panoramic view of Valdemeca(Small town).

- Flag Coat of arms

- Location within Spain Location within Castilla-La Mancha
- Coordinates: 40°14′N 1°44′W
- Country: Spain
- Autonomous community: Castile-La Mancha
- Province: Cuenca

Population (2025-01-01)
  - Total: 83
- Time zone: UTC+1 (CET)
  - Summer (DST): UTC+2 (CEST)

Valdemeca is a municipality in the province of Cuenca, in the autonomous community of Castile-La Mancha, Spain.

The municipality has an area is 70 km^{2} and its climate is continental. The geographical coordinates of Valdemeca are: latitude, 40° 13′59″N; longitude, 1° 43′59″W and altitude, 1387 meters. As of 2003, the municipality had a population of 101 (56 male, 45 female). The density is only 1.4 people/km^{2}. The municipality has lost 13.6% of its population in the last decade (1996-2005).

The mayor of Valdemeca is Mr. Moisés Heras García of the party Izquierda Unida de Castilla-La Mancha. Valdemeca is one of the few municipalities of Spain with "one-man municipal council" (i.e. small municipalities with an elected mayor but no municipal council as such) where Izquierda Unida has succeeded in getting its candidate elected.

In the 2004 Spanish General Election, the Partido Popular got 39 votes (61.9%), the Partido Socialista Obrero Español got 17 (27.0%) and Izquierda Unida de Castilla-La Mancha got 7 (11.1%).
