= N-340 road (Spain) =

Road in Spain

Coordinates: 36°27′02″N 6°08′17″W

National road N-340
- Carretera nacional N-340
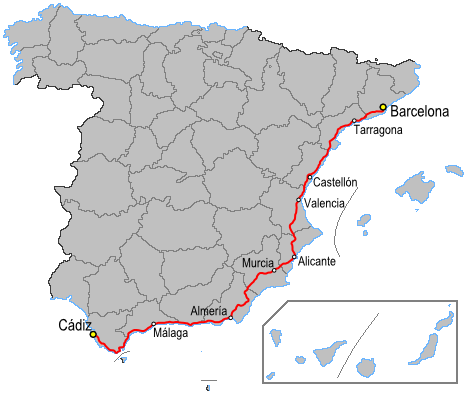

Route information
- Length: 1,248 km (775 mi)

Major junctions
- From: Cádiz
- To: Barcelona

Location
- Country: Spain

Highway system
- Highways in Spain; Autopistas and autovías; National Roads

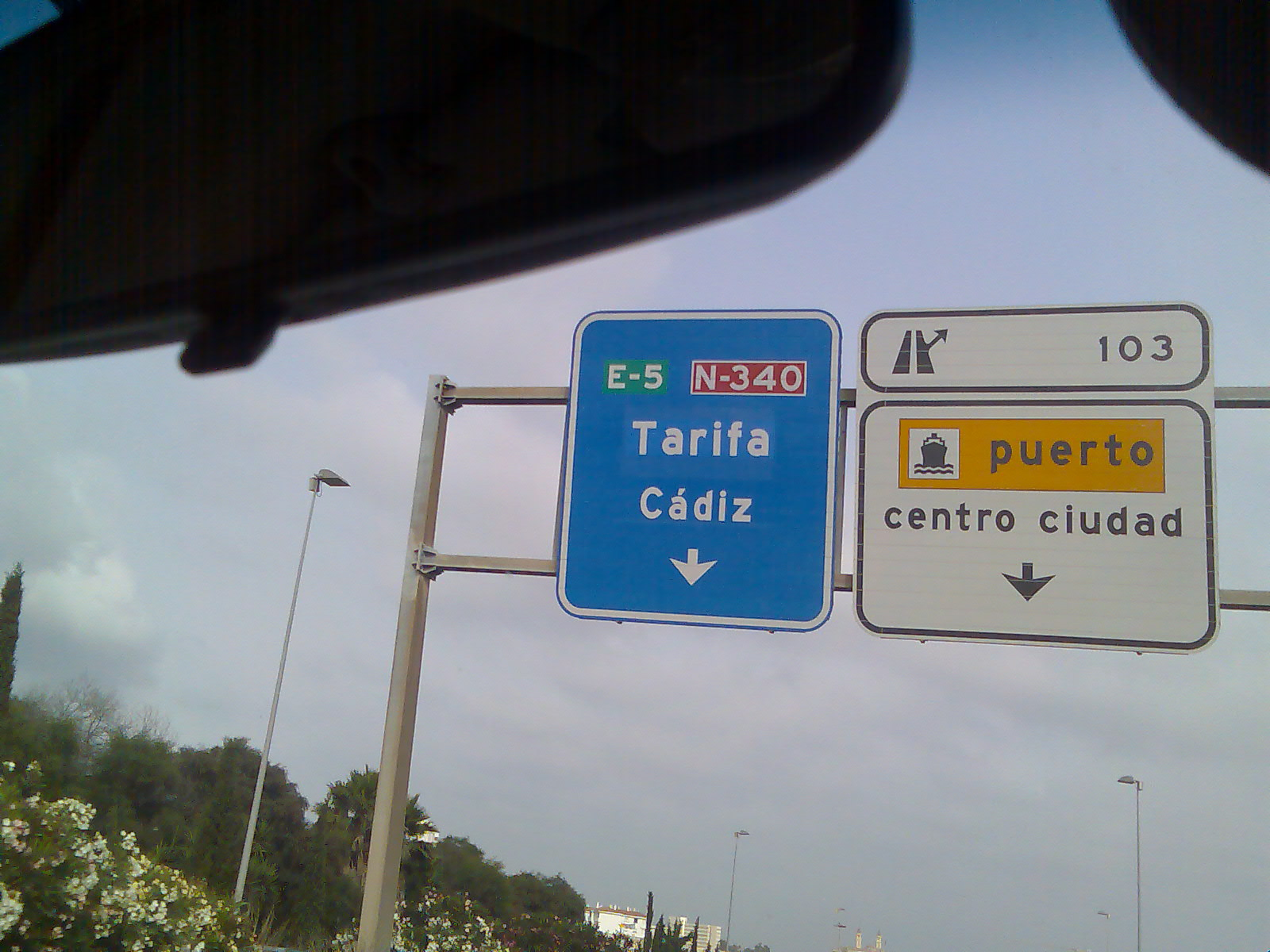
N-340 Signal

The N-340 is a major highway in Spain. It is over 1,000 km long starting south of Barcelona and running predominantly along the coast to Chiclana de la Frontera and the N-IV to Cádiz. In many places the road has now been by-passed by the Autovía A-7 and Autopista AP-7.

It follows the former Roman road Via Augusta, that was one of the main roads of Hispania. The N-340 route passes the Arc de Berà, a Roman arch.

The road starts at the Passeig de Josep Carner in Barcelona. It follows the Avinguda del Paral·lel, Plaça d'Espanya, Carrer de Sants and Carretera de Collblanc before becoming the Carretera de Cadiz a Barcelona and heading through a series of suburbs and industrial areas.

The road crosses the Llobregat valley with a junction with the Autovía A-2 and Autovía B-24, it heads through the Garraf Massif to Vilafranca del Penedès. It then heads along the coast to Tarragona, changing to the A7 until Cambrils, then crossing the River Ebro (delta) and on to Peníscola. Then it passes through Castellón de la Plana after which much of the road has been superseded by the Autovía CV-10 and Autovía V-21 to Valencia.

South of Valencia the road is the Autovía V-31 before becoming the N-340 after junction 536 km of the A-7. The road then heads inland with a junction with the Autovía A-35 before crossing the Sierra de Benicadell through Alcoy. The road then branches off along the Rio Torremanzanas towards Alicante. Through traffic now takes the Autovía A-36. The N-340 then passes through Elche and Murcia, where the road is at parts dangerous. after which the road is downgraded and joins the A-7 for several stretches. It goes through Lorca.

At junction 516 km the road branches in two with the N-340A heading west to Tabernas and the Autovía A-92. The main N-340 becomes the A-7 past Almería until Adra where the Autopista is under construction. The N-340 passes along the coast past Motril, Nerja where the A-7 begins again. After Málaga the road heads through Torremolinos and Fuengirola before becoming the A-7 again. The N-340 re-emerges at Marbella and Puerto Banús and follows the coast south to Estepona where it joins the A-7 again to Algeciras past Gibraltar. The Autovía A-381 takes most traffic west to Jerez de la Frontera through the Sierra Blanquilla.

The N-340 passes Tarifa past the Punta Marroquí o de Tarifa. It then passes Vejer de la Frontera and ends at Chiclana de la Frontera and the N-IV. The last section is being upgraded to the Autovía A-48.

== Major Incidents ==
In the Los Alfaques disaster of 11 July 1978, a road tanker carrying liquefied propylene ruptured and exploded on the N-340 near a holiday campsite in Alcanar. The explosion and ensuing fires resulted in the deaths of 215 people, in addition to over 300 victims of burns and other injuries.

On 29 August 2001 Binter Mediterráneo Flight 8261 (Registration EC-FBC) crash-landed adjacent to the N-340 near Ruiz Picasso International Airport at Málaga, Spain. Of 44 people aboard, four were killed. The aircraft was scrapped.

== Autovía A-36 ==
The Autovía A-36 is an upgrade of the N-340 which provides a more direct (and toll free) route between Alicante and Valencia than the Autopista AP-7 which runs along the coast. It is scheduled to become the Autovía A-7.

== See also ==
- Autovía del Mediterráneo
- Autopista del Mediterráneo
- Autovía Costa de la Luz
- N-232 road (Spain)
