= N-4 road (Spain) =

Major highway in Spain, connecting Madrid to Cádiz

National road IV
- Carretera nacional N-IV
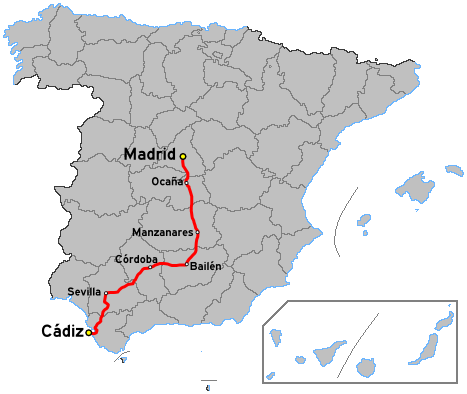

Route information
- Length: 645 km (401 mi)

Major junctions
- From: Sevilla
- To: Jerez de la Frontera

Location
- Country: Spain

Highway system
- Highways in Spain; Autopistas and autovías; National Roads

The N-IV is a major highway in Spain. It connects Madrid to Cádiz. It has generally been up-graded or replaced by the Autovía A-4, with the exception of the section between Los Palacios y Villafranca and Jerez de la Frontera, and remaining sections which now serve as accesses roads from the Autovia to the various cities and towns it passed through, such as Valdepenas, Bailén, Andújar, Córdoba, Ecija, Seville and Jerez.

The totality of the route forms part of European route E-5.

With the removal of tolls on the Autopista AP-4 between Seville and Jerez, the amount of traffic on the parallel original section of the N-IV plummeted, leading to the closure of petrol stations and other businesses.
