= Autovía EX-A2 =

Freeway in Extremadura

Coordinates: 39.050628°N 5.872367°W

Autovía EX-A2
- Autovía de las Vegas Altas (Spanish)
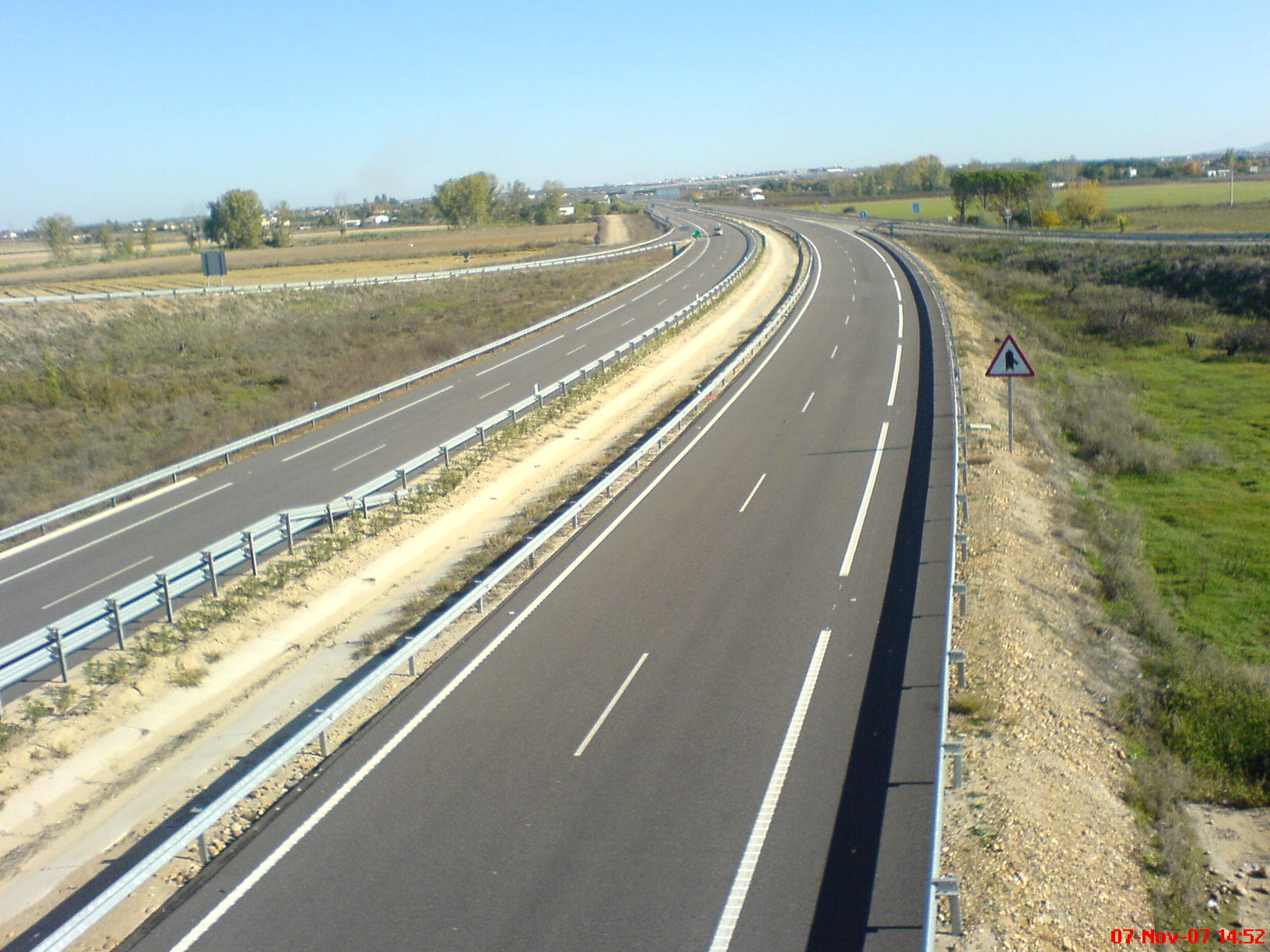

Route information
- Length: 23.735 km (14.748 mi)

Major junctions
- North end: A-5 / E90 at Miajadas
- South end: EX-206 at Don Benito

Location
- Country: Spain
- Autonomous community: Extremadura
- Provinces: Cáceres, Badajoz

Highway system
- Highways in Spain; Autopistas and autovías; National Roads

The EX-A2 is an autovía in Extremadura. It originates from the Autovía A-5 (Spanish: Autovía del Suroeste, lit. 'Southwest Motorway') near the town of Miajadas and ends at the EX-206, a road that connects Don Benito and Villanueva de la Serena.

It runs parallel to the EX-106, which directly serves the same towns bypassed by the EX-A2. The autovía belongs to the road network owned by the Junta de Extremadura.

== History ==
The autovía was constructed in approximately 37 months at a cost of €101 million (equivalent to €144 million in 2023). It opened at noon on 19 April 2006, by the president of Extremadura, Juan Carlos Rodríguez Ibarra. The opening of the highway was hailed as a potential economic boon as it connected the most important cities of las Vegas Altas to the rest of Europe by controlled-access highways.

== Major intersections ==
Province	Location	km	mi	Exit	Destinations	Notes
Cáceres	Miajadas	0.000	0.000		A-5 / E90 – Miajadas, Madrid	
Cáceres	Miajadas	5.400	3.355	6	EX-106 – Miajadas	
Badajoz	Vivares	6.160	3.828	8	Vivares, Casar de Miajadas, Valdehornillos	
Badajoz	Ruecas	14.350	8.917	15	N-430 – Mérida, Badajoz, Ciudad Real	
Badajoz	Don Benito	19.100	11.868	20	EX-A2-R1 – Don Benito (west); EX-106 – Don Benito (central)	
Badajoz	Villanueva de la Serena	22.300	13.857	23	EX-A2-R2 – Villanueva de la Serena (north)	Autovía ends
Badajoz	Villanueva de la Serena	23.735	14.748		EX-206 – Villanueva de la Serena, Don Benito	Roundabout
1.000 mi = 1.609 km; 1.000 km = 0.621 mi
