= Autovía A-5 =

Road in Spain

Autovía A-5
- Autovía del Suroeste
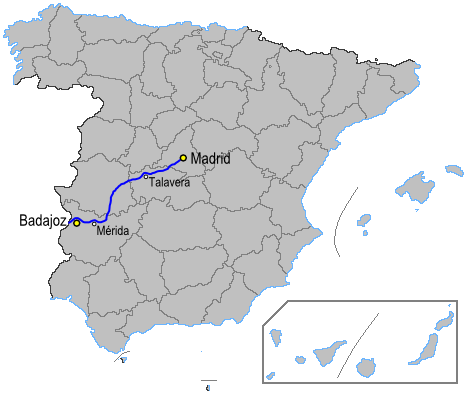

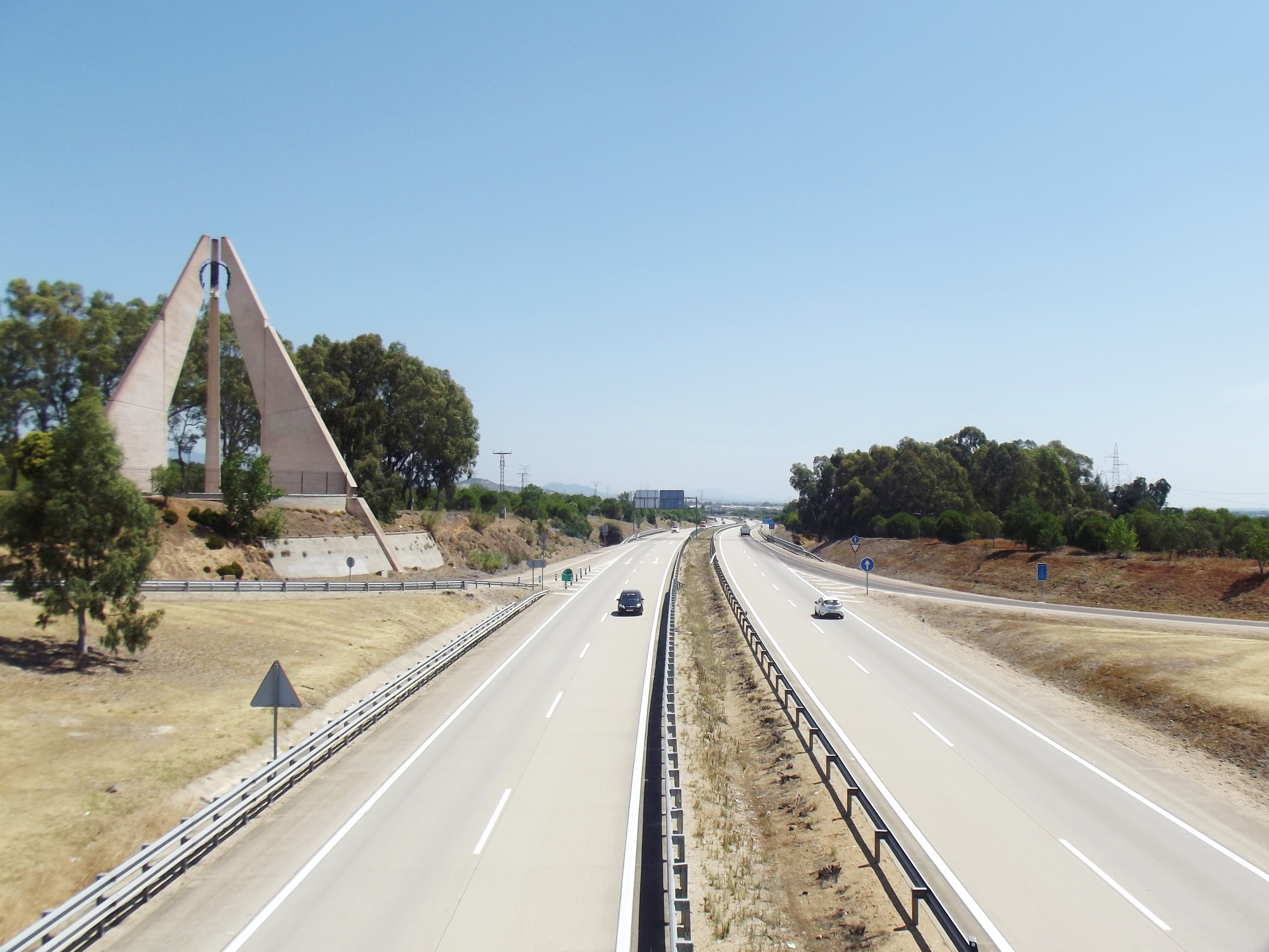

Route information
- Length: 408 km (254 mi)

Major junctions
- Northeast end: M-30 in Madrid
- M-40 in Madrid near Cuatro Vientos; R-5 in Alcorcón; M-50 in Alcorcón; R-5 in Navalcarnero; CM-41 in Valmojado; N-403 in Maqueda; N-502 in Talavera de la Reina; EX-A1 in Navalmoral de la Mata; A-58 in Trujillo; EX-A2 in Miajadas; N-430 in Guareña near Torresfresneda; A-66 in Mérida
- Southwest end: A6 in the Portuguese border

Location
- Country: Spain

Highway system
- Highways in Spain; Autopistas and autovías; National Roads

The Autovía A-5 (also called Autovía del Suroeste) is a Spanish autovía which starts in Madrid and ends at the Portugal–Spain border, near Badajoz, where it connects to the Portuguese A6 motorway.

It is one of the six radial autovías stemming from Madrid and forms part of European route E90. It replaced most of the former N-V road.

== Sections ==
#	From	To	Length	Signal
1	Madrid	Móstoles	23.50 km	A-5
2	Móstoles	Talavera de la Reina	99.81 km	A-5
3	Talavera de la Reina	Oropesa	32.02 km	A-5
4	Oropesa	Navalmoral de la Mata	35.22 km	A-5
5	Navalmoral de la Mata	Trujillo	65.98 km	A-5
6	Trujillo	Miajadas	38.40 km	A-5
7	Miajadas	Mérida	49.97 km	A-5
8	Mérida	Badajoz	60.07 km	A-5

== Major cities crossed ==
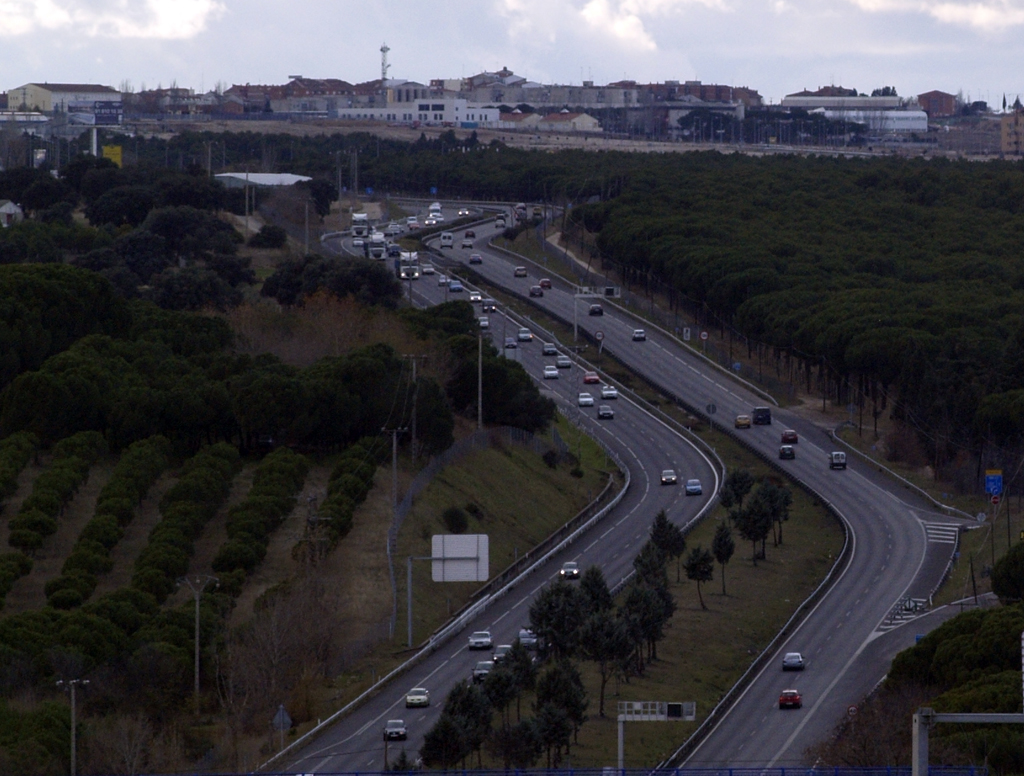
The A-5 motorway heading southwest towards Navalcarnero

- Madrid
- Alcorcón
- Móstoles
- Navalcarnero
- Talavera de la Reina
- Trujillo
- Mérida
- Badajoz
