= Government of María Guardiola =

Government of María Guardiola may refer to:

- First government of María Guardiola (2023–2026)
- Second government of María Guardiola (2026–present)
