= José Luis Quintana (politician) =

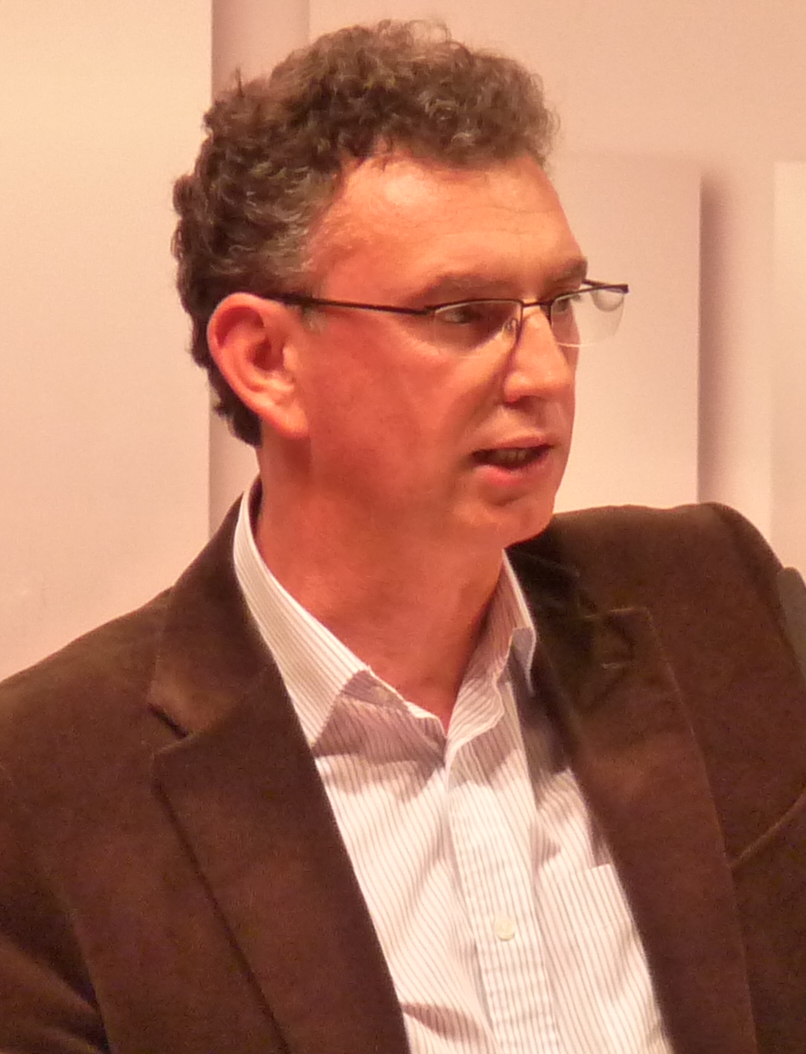

José Luis Quintana Álvarez (born 4 December 1960) is a Spanish Socialist Workers' Party (PSOE) politician. He was a member of the council in Don Benito in Extremadura from 1999 to 2003 and from 2011 to 2023, and was the town's mayor from 2015 to 2023. He was a minister in the Regional Government of Extremadura from 2003 to 2011. He was named Government Delegate to Extremadura in 2023, and in 2025 he was put in charge of a managing commission running the PSOE in Extremadura.

== Biography ==
In June 2003, Quintana was named minister of agriculture and environment in the Regional Government of Extremadura, under Juan Carlos Rodríguez Ibarra. Four years later, the next president of the Regional Government of Extremadura, Guillermo Fernández Vara, named him Minister of Growth.

Quintana was the Spanish Socialist Workers' Party (PSOE) candidate for mayor of Don Benito in 2011. His party rose from eight to ten seats on the council, while the People's Party (PP) of incumbent Mariano Gallego lost two seats but kept a majority with 11. In 2015, Quintana won the mayoralty and Gallego died between the election and the investiture; Quintana announced that the local bullring would be named after Gallego. He won a second mandate in 2019, adding one more seat while the PP lost three with the arrival of Citizens.

Quintana promoted a municipal merger with nearby Villanueva de la Serena, which would have made the third-biggest municipality in Extremadura. This was opposed by the party Siempre Don Benito (Always Don Benito), who formed a local government with the PP in 2023. Quintana, whose party was the most voted for, referred to "a pact of losers whose only objective is to kick us out the council" and accused People's Party of Extremadura leader María Guardiola of changing her view on the merger. He resigned his seat as councillor in July to spend more time with his family, while maintaining his role as the local PSOE secretary general.

In December 2023, Quintana was named Government Delegate to Extremadura. Two years later, he was put in charge of the managing commission running the PSOE in Extremadura due to the resignation of Miguel Ángel Gallardo after a record electoral loss.
