= Second government of María Guardiola =

2nd government of María Guardiola
- 12th Government of Extremadura
- Incoming 2026
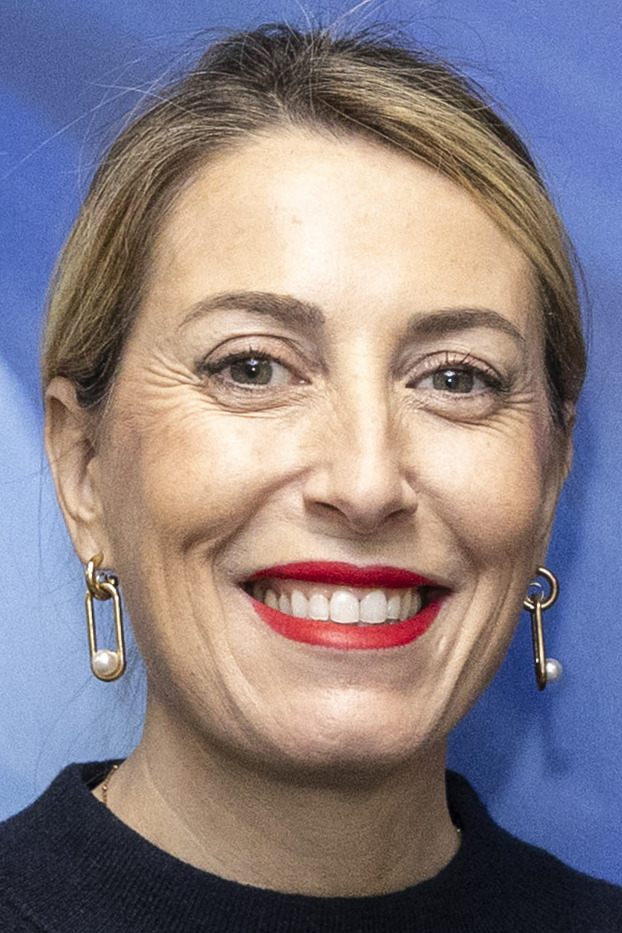
- María Guardiola in February 2025.
- Date formed: 30 April 2026

People and organisations
- Monarch: Felipe VI
- President: María Guardiola
- Member parties: PP; Vox
- Status in legislature: Majority (coalition)
- Opposition party: PSOE
- Opposition leader: Álvaro Sánchez Cotrina

History
- Election: 2025 regional election
- Legislature term: 12th Assembly
- Predecessor: Guardiola I

The second government of María Guardiola was formed on 30 April 2026, following the latter's election as president of Extremadura by the Assembly of Extremadura on 22 April and her swearing-in on 24 April, as a result of the People's Party (PP) and Vox being able to muster a majority of seats in the Assembly following the 2025 Extremaduran regional election. It will succeed the first government of María Guardiola and has been the incumbent Government of Extremadura since 30 April 2026, a total of 158 days.

The cabinet will comprise members of the PP and Vox, as well as a number of independents proposed by PP.

== Investiture ==
Investiture; Nomination of María Guardiola (PP)
Ballot →	22 April 2026
Required majority →	33 out of 65
Yes: • PP (29); • Vox (11)	40 / 65
No: • PSOE (18); • UxE (7)	25 / 65
Abstentions	0 / 65
Absentees	0 / 65

== Council of Government ==
The Council of Government is structured into the office for the president, the vice president and ten ministries.

← Guardiola II Government → (30 April 2026 – present)
Portfolio	Name	Party	Took office	Left office	Ref.
President	María Guardiola	PP	23 April 2026	Incumbent	
Vice President; Minister of Deregulation, Social Services and Family Affairs	Óscar Fernández	Vox	30 April 2026	Incumbent	
Vice President; Minister of the Presidency, Coordination of Government Action, Interior and Emergencies	Abel Bautista	PP	30 April 2026	Incumbent	
Minister of Finance, Public Administration and Social Dialogue	Elena Manzano	PP	30 April 2026	Incumbent	
Minister of Industry, Energy, Science and Territory	Mercedes Morán	PP	30 April 2026	Incumbent	
Minister of Economy, Employment and Digital Transformation	Guillermo Santamaría	Independent	30 April 2026	Incumbent	
Minister of Health and Dependency Care	Sara García Espada	PP	30 April 2026	Incumbent	
Minister of Agriculture, Livestock and Natural Environment	Juan José García	Vox	30 April 2026	Incumbent	
Minister of Culture, Tourism and Sports	Laureano León	PP	30 April 2026	Incumbent	
Minister of Education and Vocational Training	Sandra Valencia	Independent	30 April 2026	Incumbent	
Minister of Infrastructure, Transport and Housing	Francisco José Ramírez	PP	30 April 2026	Incumbent	

Preceded by Guardiola I	Government of Extremadura; 2026–present	Incumbent
