= Miguel Gallardo =

Miguel Gallardo may refer to:

- Miguel Ángel Félix Gallardo (1946–2026), Mexican druglord
- Miguel Gallardo (singer) (1950–2025), Spanish singer-songwriter
- Miguel Gallardo (comics artist) (1955–2022), Spanish comics artist
- Miguel Ángel Gallardo (politician) (born 1974), Spanish politician
- Miguel Gallardo Valles (born 1981), Mexican tennis player
- Miguel Gallardo (footballer) (born 1984), Mexican footballer
