= Miguel Ángel Gallardo =

Miguel Ángel Gallardo may refer to:

- Miguel Gallardo (comics artist) (1955–2022), Spanish comics artist, full name Miguel Ángel Gallardo Paredes
- Miguel Gallardo Valles (born 1981), Mexican tennis player, full name Miguel Ángel Gallardo Valles
- Miguel Ángel Félix Gallardo (1946–2026), Mexican druglord
- Miguel Ángel Gallardo (politician) (born 1974), Spanish politician
