= Salorino =

Salorino may refer to:

- Salorino, Cáceres, a municipality located in the province of Cáceres, Extremadura, Spain.
- Salorino, a municipality incorporated in the municipality Mendrisio.
