= José Quintana (disambiguation) =

José Quintana may refer to:

- Changuito (born 1948; as José Luís Quintana), Cuban percussionist
- José Quintana (born 1989), Major League Baseball player
- José Luis Naranjo y Quintana (born 1944), Mexican politician
- José Luis Quintana (politician) (born 1960), Spanish politician

== See also ==
- José Quintanilla (disambiguation)
