= Álvaro Sánchez Cotrina =

Secretary-General of the Socialist Workers' Party of Extremadura
- Incumbent
- Assumed office 25 April 2026
- President: Marisol Mateos Nogales
- Preceded by: Miguel Ángel Gallardo

Member of the Assembly of Extremadura
- Incumbent
- Assumed office 19 June 2023
- Constituency: Cáceres

Mayor of Salorino
- Incumbent
- Assumed office 11 June 2011

Personal details
- Born: 2 August 1986 (age 40) Cáceres, Spain
- Party: Socialist Workers' Party
- Education: National University of Distance Education, University of Extremadura

Álvaro Sánchez Cotrina (born 2 August 1986) is a Spanish politician. A member of the Spanish Socialist Workers' Party (PSOE), he was elected mayor of Salorino in 2011, and elected to the Assembly of Extremadura in 2023. He was voted secretary general of his party in the province of Cáceres in 2025 and of the PSOE in Extremadura in 2026.

== Biography ==
Sánchez Cotrina was born in Cáceres and raised in Salorino, a nearby village of around 500 inhabitants. His grandparents were farmers and his father was a construction worker. He graduated with a law degree from the National University of Distance Education and has a diploma in public administration and management from the University of Extremadura.

After joining the Socialist Youth of Spain, Sánchez Cotrina was elected mayor of Salorino in 2011; at 24 he was among the youngest mayors in the province of Cáceres. From 2015 to 2023, he sat in the provincial deputation, and was tasked with areas including culture, tourism and demographic challenges. He focused on the issues of depopulation and public services for rural areas. He was 15th on the Spanish Socialist Workers' Party (PSOE) list in the Cáceres constituency in the 2023 Extremaduran regional election, and was not immediately elected, taking his seat two months later when Begoña García resigned to take a seat in the Congress of Deputies.

In March 2025, Sánchez Cotrina was elected secretary general of the PSOE in the province of Cáceres, with support of three quarters of members. Regional secretary general Miguel Ángel Gallardo named him leader of the PSOE list in Cáceres for the 2025 Extremaduran regional election. After a heavy defeat and legal issues, Gallardo resigned. Sánchez Cotrina ran to replace him against Soraya Vega, exactly one year his junior; on 11 April 2026 he won by 3,572 votes to 2,529 and became the first person from the province of Cáceres to lead the Extremaduran PSOE.
