= Third government of Guillermo Fernández Vara =

3rd government of Guillermo Fernández Vara
- 10th Government of Extremadura
- 2019–2023
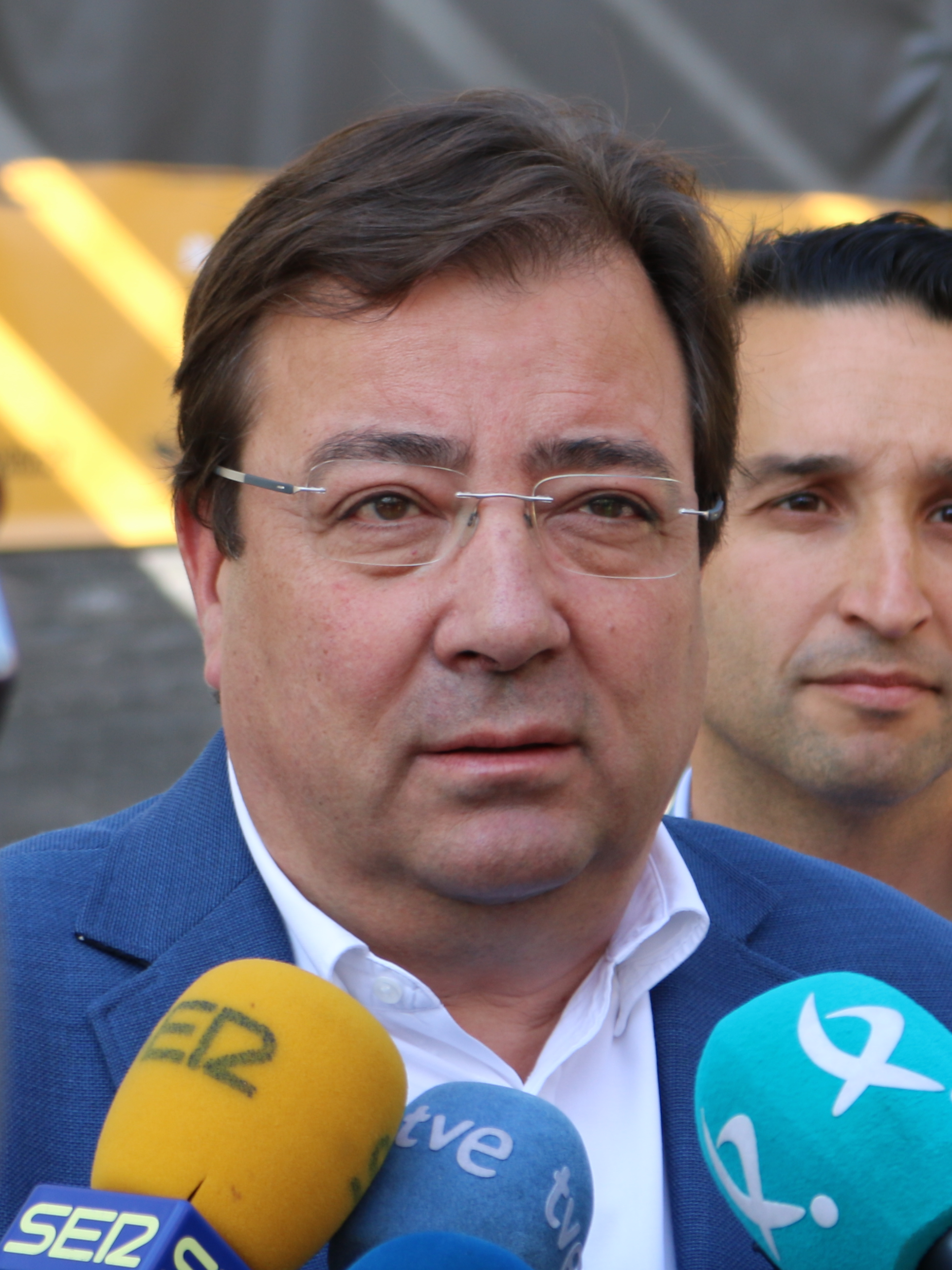
- Date formed: 2 July 2019
- Date dissolved: 21 July 2023

People and organisations
- Monarch: Felipe VI
- President: Guillermo Fernández Vara
- Vice President: Pilar Blanco–Morales^{1st} José María Vergeles^{2nd}
- No. of ministers: 10 (Note: Does not include the President.)
- Total no. of members: 10
- Member party: PSOE
- Status in legislature: Majority government
- Opposition party: PP
- Opposition leader: José Antonio Monago (2019–2022); María Guardiola (2022–2023)

History
- Election: 2019 regional election
- Outgoing election: 2023 regional election
- Legislature term: 10th Assembly
- Predecessor: Vara II
- Successor: Guardiola

The third government of Guillermo Fernández Vara was formed on 2 July 2019, following the latter's election as President of Extremadura by the Assembly of Extremadura on 25 June and his swearing-in on 27 June, as a result of the PSOE emerging as the largest parliamentary force at the 2019 Extremaduran regional election by securing an absolute majority of seats in the Assembly. It succeeded the second government of Guillermo Fernández Vara and was the Government of Extremadura from 2 July 2019 to 21 July 2023, a total of 1,480 days, or 4 years and 19 days.

The cabinet was an all–PSOE government. It was automatically dismissed on 29 May 2023 as a consequence of the 2023 regional election, but remained in acting capacity until the next government was sworn in.

== Investiture ==
Investiture; Guillermo Fernández Vara (PSOE)
Ballot →	25 June 2019
Required majority →	33 out of 65
Yes: • PSOE (34)	34 / 65
No: • PP (20)	20 / 65
Abstentions: • Cs (7); • UpE (4)	11 / 65
Absentees	0 / 65

== Council of Government ==
The Council of Government was structured into the offices for the president, the two vice presidents and 9 ministries. From December 2021, the number of ministries was increased to 10, as the Ministry of Equality and Spokesperson was split into the Ministry of Equality and Cooperation for Development and the post of the Spokesperson of the Government.

← Fernández Vara III Government → (2 July 2019 – 21 July 2023)
Portfolio	Name	Party	Took office	Left office	Ref.
President	Guillermo Fernández Vara	PSOE	27 June 2019	15 July 2023	
First Vice President, Minister of Finance and Public Administration	Pilar Blanco-Morales	PSOE	2 July 2019	21 July 2023	
Second Vice President, Minister of Health and Social Services	José María Vergeles	PSOE	2 July 2019	21 July 2023	
Minister of Agriculture, Rural Development, Population and Territory	Begoña García Bernal	PSOE	2 July 2019	14 June 2023	
Minister of Economy, Science and Digital Agenda	Rafael España	PSOE	2 July 2019	21 July 2023	
Minister of Education and Employment	Esther Gutiérrez	PSOE	2 July 2019	16 June 2023	
Minister of Mobility, Transport and Housing	Leire Iglesias	PSOE	2 July 2019	21 July 2023	
Minister of Equality and Spokesperson	Isabel Gil Rosiña	PSOE	2 July 2019	3 December 2021	
Minister of Culture, Tourism and Sports	Nuria Flores	PSOE	2 July 2019	21 July 2023	
Minister of Ecological Transition and Sustainability	Olga García	PSOE	2 July 2019	21 July 2023	
=== Changes December 2021 ===
Portfolio	Name	Party	Took office	Left office	Ref.
Minister of Equality and Cooperation for Development	Isabel Gil Rosiña	PSOE	3 December 2021	21 July 2023	
Spokesperson of the Government	Juan Antonio González	PSOE	3 December 2021	14 June 2023	
=== Changes June 2023 ===
Portfolio	Name	Party	Took office	Left office	Ref.
Minister of Agriculture, Rural Development, Population and Territory	Pilar Blanco–Morales took on the ordinary discharge of duties from 14 June 2023 to 21 July 2023.				
Spokesperson of the Government	José María Vergeles took on the ordinary discharge of duties from 14 June 2023 to 21 July 2023.				
Minister of Education and Employment	Rafael España took on the ordinary discharge of duties from 16 June 2023 to 21 July 2023.				

== Notes ==
Preceded by Vara II	Government of Extremadura; 2019–2023	Succeeded by Guardiola
