= Second government of Guillermo Fernández Vara =

Second Fernández Vara Government
- Government of Extremadura

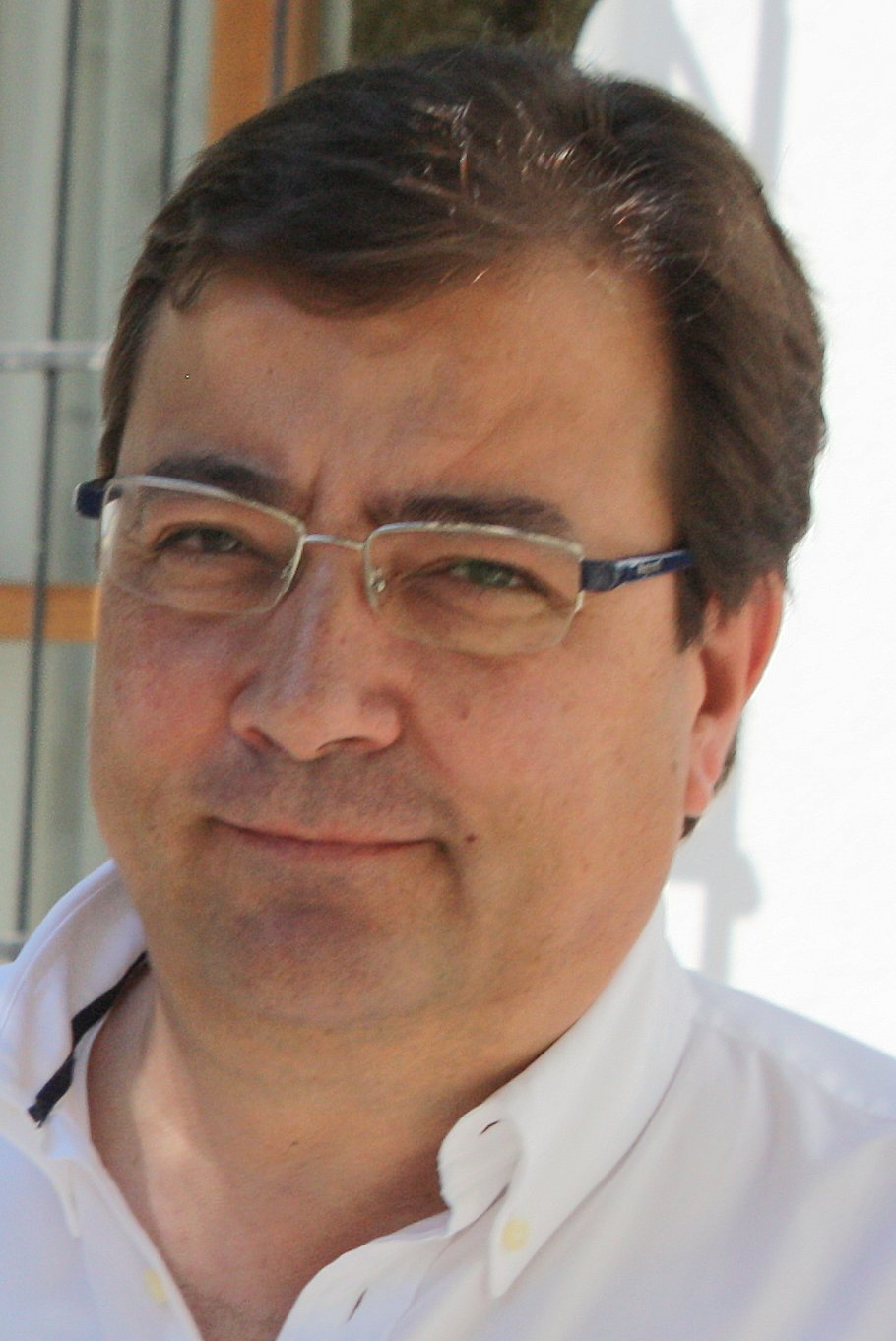
- Date formed: 2 July 2015
- Date dissolved: 1 July 2019

People and organisations
- Head of government: Guillermo Fernández Vara
- Deputy head of government: Pilar Blanco-Morales
- No. of ministers: 8
- Member party: Spanish Socialist Workers' Party
- Status in legislature: Minority government
- Opposition party: People's Party
- Opposition leader: José Antonio Monago

History
- Election: 2015 regional election
- Legislature term: 9th Assembly (2015–19)
- Predecessor: Monago
- Successor: Fernández Vara III

The Second Fernández Vara Government was the regional government of Extremadura led by President Guillermo Fernández Vara. It was formed in July 2015 after the regional election and ended in July 2019 following the regional election.

== Government ==
Name	Portrait	Party	Office	Took office	Left office	^{Refs.}
Guillermo Fernández Vara		Spanish Socialist Workers' Party of Extremadura	President	2 July 2015	27 June 2019	
Pilar Blanco-Morales		Spanish Socialist Workers' Party of Extremadura	Vice President	30 October 2017	1 July 2019	
Pilar Blanco-Morales		Spanish Socialist Workers' Party of Extremadura	Minister for Finance and Public Administration	6 July 2015	1 July 2019	
Begoña García		Spanish Socialist Workers' Party of Extremadura	Minister of Environment and Rural, Agrarian Policies and Territory	15 September 2015	1 July 2019	
Olga García		Spanish Socialist Workers' Party of Extremadura	Minister of Economy and Infrastructure	31 July 2018	1 July 2019	
Isabel Gil		Spanish Socialist Workers' Party of Extremadura	Government Spokesperson	6 July 2015	1 July 2019	
Esther Gutiérrez		Spanish Socialist Workers' Party of Extremadura	Minister of Education and Employment	6 July 2015	1 July 2019	
Leire Iglesias		Spanish Socialist Workers' Party of Extremadura	Minister of Culture and Equality	30 October 2017	1 July 2019	
Santos Jorna		Spanish Socialist Workers' Party of Extremadura	Minister of Environment and Rural, Agrarian Policies and Territory	6 July 2015	14 September 2015	
José Luis Navarro		Spanish Socialist Workers' Party of Extremadura	Minister of Economy and Infrastructure	6 July 2015	30 July 2018	
José María Vergeles		Spanish Socialist Workers' Party of Extremadura	Minister of Health and Social Policies	6 July 2015	1 July 2019	
