= Ignacio Higuero =

Spanish politician

Ignacio Higuero de Juan (born 31 January 1968) is a Spanish former politician who was the Minister of Forest Management and the Rural World in the Regional Government of Extremadura from 2023 to 2025, when he resigned over a false qualification on his curriculum vitae. He was appointed as a member of Vox and quit the party in July 2024.

== Biography ==
Higuero was born in Madrid and raised in Cáceres in Extremadura. From 1993 to 1994 he was a professional hunter in Zimbabwe. He began working in Spain's oldest hunting business, Sierra de San Pedro; from 2009 to 2023 he was president of the Asociación de Profesionales de Caza de Extremadura (Association of Hunting Professionals of Extremadura).

In the 2023 Extremaduran regional election, the People's Party won a plurality of seats and its leader María Guardiola formed a coalition government with Vox. Vox held one office, the Ministry of Forest Management and the Rural World, which was led by Camino Limia. On 6 October 2023, she resigned, and the following day Higuero was removed as Director General of Forest Management, Hunting and Fishing and appointed minister. In October 2023, it emerged that he had been sanctioned and fined in 2014 and 2015 over non-compliance with the regional hunting laws, of which he was now in charge.

In July 2024, Vox's national leader Santiago Abascal severed all regional coalition governments with the PP, due to a dispute over the housing of unaccompanied migrant minors. Higuero quit Vox and remained in his ministry. He resigned on 1 August 2025 due to a revelation of job fraud; he had claimed on his curriculum vitae to have a marketing degree from Universidad CEU San Pablo in 1993, but that institution did not offer such a course then.
