= María Sirvent =

Spanish writer (born 1980)

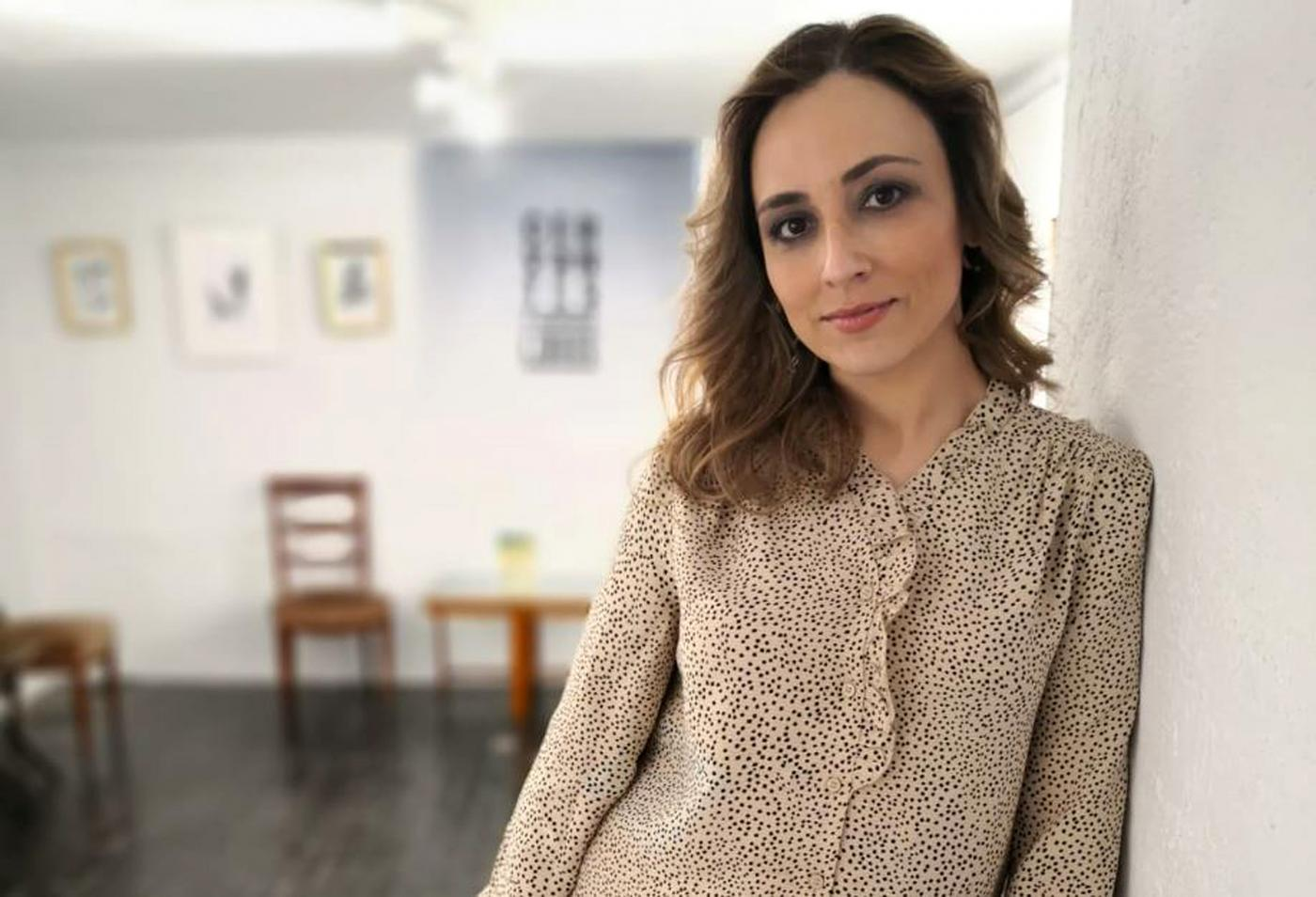
María Sirvent

Maria Sirvent is a Spanish writer. She was born in Andújar in 1980, and grew up in Don Benito (Badajoz province) and in Ciudad Rodrigo (Salamanca province). She went to Valladolid to study engineering, but dropped out and moved to Ireland, living there for three years. She has also lived in Italy and Mexico. It was in Mexico that she began to write. She has published two novels, Si supieras que nunca he estado en Londres, volverías de Tokio and Los años impares.

Sirvent lives in Barcelona.
