= First government of María Guardiola =

1st government of María Guardiola
- 11th Government of Extremadura
- 2023–2026
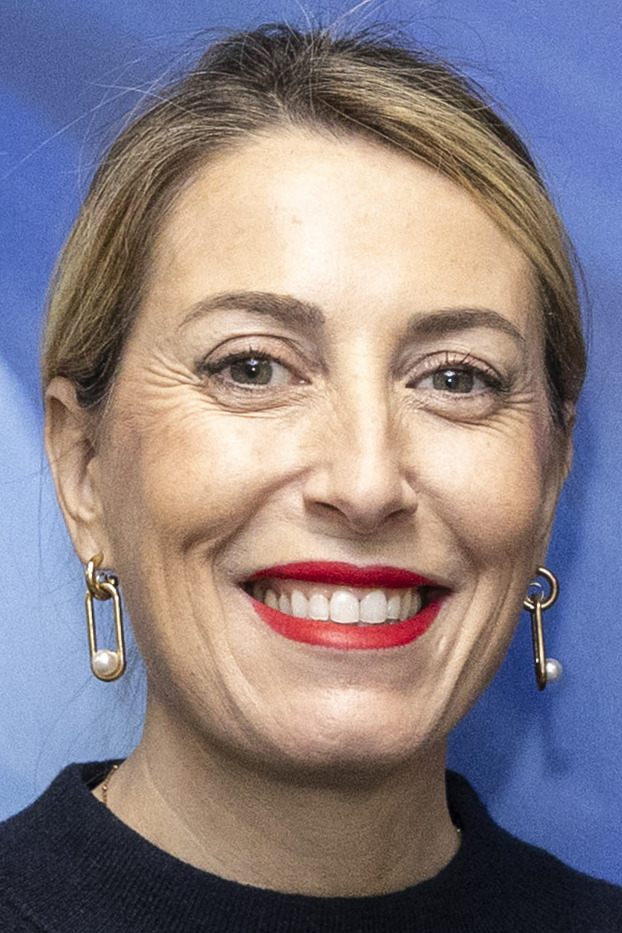
- María Guardiola in February 2025.
- Date formed: 21 July 2023
- Date dissolved: 30 April 2026

People and organisations
- Monarch: Felipe VI
- President: María Guardiola
- No. of ministers: 9 (Note: Does not include the President.)
- Total no. of members: 11
- Member parties: PP; Vox (2023–2024)
- Status in legislature: Majority (coalition) (2023–2024); Minority (single-party) (2024–2026)
- Opposition party: PSOE
- Opposition leader: Guillermo Fernández Vara (2023–2024); Miguel Ángel Gallardo (2024–2025)

History
- Election: 2023 regional election
- Outgoing election: 2025 regional election
- Legislature term: 11th Assembly
- Predecessor: Vara III
- Successor: Guardiola II

The first government of María Guardiola was formed on 21 July 2023, following the latter's election as president of Extremadura by the Assembly of Extremadura on 14 July and her swearing-in on 17 July, as a result of the People's Party (PP) and Vox being able to muster a majority of seats in the Assembly following the 2023 Extremaduran regional election. It succeeded the third government of Guillermo Fernández Vara and was the Government of Extremadura from 21 July 2023 to 30 April 2026, a total of 1,014 days, or 2 years, 9 months and 9 days.

Until 2024, the cabinet comprised members of the PP and Vox, as well as a number of independents proposed by the first party. On 11 July 2024, Vox leader Santiago Abascal forced the break up of all PP–Vox governments at the regional level over a national controversy regarding the distribution of unaccompanied migrant minors among the autonomous communities.

== Investiture ==
Investiture; Nomination of María Guardiola (PP)
Ballot →	14 July 2023
Required majority →	33 out of 65
Yes: • PP (28); • Vox (5)	33 / 65
No: • PSOE (28); • UP (4)	32 / 65
Abstentions	0 / 65
Absentees	0 / 65

== Cabinet changes ==
Guardiola's government saw a number of cabinet changes during its tenure:

- On 5 October 2023, Camino Limia announced her resignation as Minister of Forest Management and Rural World over personal disagreements with Vox's national leadership. She was replaced in her post by Ignacio Higuero on 7 October 2023.
- On 1 August 2025, Ignacio Higuero resigned as Forest Management and Rural World minister due to his involvement in a resume padding scandal, being replaced in the post the next day by Francisco José Ramírez.

== Council of Government ==
The Council of Government is structured into the office for the president and nine ministries.

← Guardiola I Government → (21 July 2023 – 30 April 2026)
Portfolio	Name	Party	Took office	Left office	Ref.
President	María Guardiola	PP	15 July 2023	23 April 2026	
Minister of the Presidency, Interior and Social Dialogue	Abel Bautista	PP	21 July 2023	30 April 2026	
Minister of Finance and Public Administration	Elena Manzano	PP	21 July 2023	30 April 2026	
Minister of Agriculture, Livestock and Sustainable Development	Mercedes Morán	PP	21 July 2023	30 April 2026	
Minister of Economy, Employment and Digital Transformation	Guillermo Santamaría	Independent	21 July 2023	30 April 2026	
Minister of Health and Social Services	Sara García Espada	PP	21 July 2023	30 April 2026	
Minister of Culture, Tourism, Youth and Sports	Victoria Bazaga	Independent	21 July 2023	30 April 2026	
Minister of Education, Science and Vocational Training	Mercedes Vaquera	Independent	21 July 2023	30 April 2026	
Minister of Infrastructure, Transport and Housing	Manuel Martín Castizo	PP	21 July 2023	30 April 2026	
Minister of Forest Management and Rural World	Camino Limia	Vox	21 July 2023	6 October 2023	
=== Changes October 2023 ===
Portfolio	Name	Party	Took office	Left office	Ref.
Minister of Forest Management and Rural World	Ignacio Higuero	Vox / Ind. (Note: Quit Vox membership in July 2024 and remained in office as an independent.)	7 October 2023	1 August 2025	
=== Changes August 2025 ===
Portfolio	Name	Party	Took office	Left office	Ref.
Minister of Forest Management and Rural World	Francisco José Ramírez	PP	2 August 2025	30 April 2026	

== Notes ==
Preceded by Vara III	Government of Extremadura; 2023–2026	Succeeded by Guardiola II
