= Camino Limia =

Spanish politician

María del Camino Limia (born 1983 or 1984) is a Spanish farmer and former politician. She was chosen by Vox to be Minister of Forest Management and the Rural World in the Government of Extremadura in 2023, and resigned in the same year.

== Biography ==
Born in Zamora, Castile and León, Limia graduated with a law degree from the University of Salamanca. She worked in urban planning and environmental regulations for the Junta of Castile and León before moving to Extremadura to work as a cattle broker. She, her partner Joaquín and his brother operate a farm in the town of Medellín that they took over from the latter two's father. From 2014 to 2016, she managed a slaughterhouse in Olivenza. As of December 2022, she had 4,200 Merino sheep.

From December 2021, Limia attracted an online audience for her criticism of the national Minister of Consumer Affairs, Alberto Garzón, who had publicly said that Spanish meat was poor and came from mistreated animals. She was interviewed on television channels such as LaSexta discussing the matter.

Limia set up the Asociación Mundial de Ganadería Sostenible (World Association of Sustainable Farming). The organisation endorses the Agenda 2030, a United Nations initiative on sustainability that is strongly opposed by her party, Vox.

After the 2023 Extremaduran regional election, the People's Party and Vox formed a government with María Guardiola as president. Vox was given one ministry, the Minister of Forest Management and the Rural World, for which Limia was appointed. On 6 October 2023, she resigned for personal reasons and returned to farming; Vox named Ignacio Higuero in her place.
