= Abel Bautista =

Spanish politician (born 1987)

Abel Bautista Morán (born 11 May 1987) is a Spanish politician of the People's Party (PP). He was named secretary general of the People's Party of Extremadura in 2022 and was elected to the Assembly of Extremadura in 2023, being appointed to the Regional Government of Extremadura.

== Biography ==
Born in Montijo in the Province of Badajoz, Bautista graduated with a law degree from the University of Salamanca and a master's degree in business law. He was elected as a town councillor in Quintana de la Serena and worked as a legal consultant for the People's Party (PP) group in the Assembly of Extremadura.

In July 2022, María Guardiola, who was the sole candidate for president of the People's Party of Extremadura, announced Bautista as the party's secretary general. In the 2023 Extremaduran regional election, Guardiola led the PP's list in the Cáceres constituency and Bautista in the Badajoz one, as the party changed 80% of its nominees compared to the 2019 election. Guardiola was elected President of the Regional Government of Extremadura and Bautista was named Minister of the Presidency, Interior and Social Dialogue in her government.

Guardiola and Bautista again led the PP lists in their respective constituencies in the 2025 Extremaduran regional election. The party remained the largest in the Assembly, but short of a majority. New statutes for the PP said that a secretary general could not also be a regional minister.

== Personal life ==
Bautista married fellow PP politician Gema Cortés, with whom he had two children as of 2022.
