= José Quintanilla =

José Quintanilla may refer to:

- José Quintanilla (footballer), Salvadoran footballer
- José Alberto Quintanilla, Bolivian swimmer

== See also ==
- José Quintana (disambiguation)
