= Miguel Gallardo (comics artist) =

Spanish comic book artist (1955–2022)

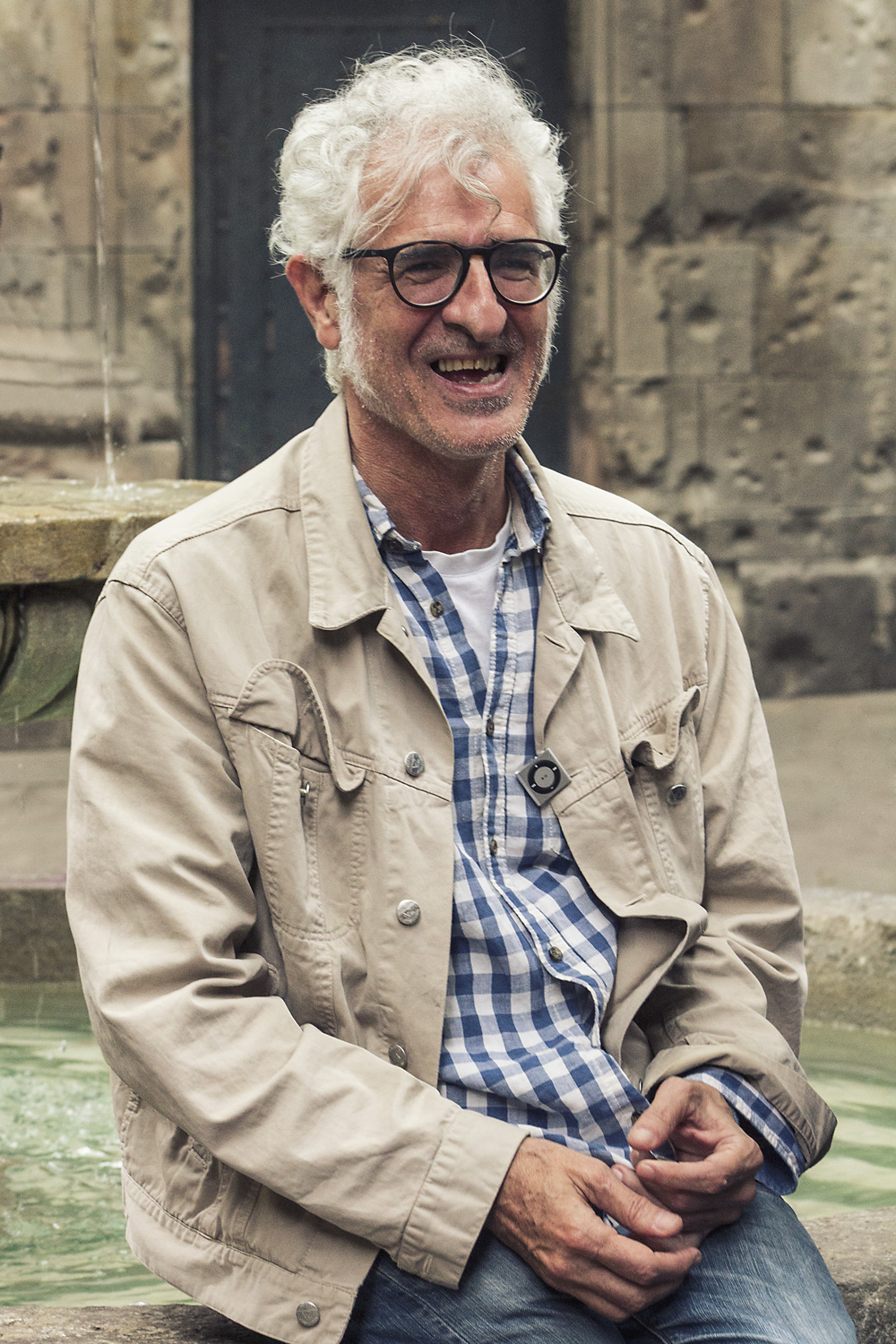
- Born: Miguel Ángel Gallardo Paredes; 27 December 1955 Lérida, Spain
- Died: 21 February 2022 (aged 66) Barcelona, Spain
- Notable works: Makoki; Maria y yo

Miguel Ángel Gallardo Paredes (27 December 1955 – 21 February 2022) was a Spanish comic book artist.

== Biography ==
He was known as a representative of the Spanish underground comics' scene of the 1970s and 1980s, publishing in magazines such as El Víbora, Cairo, Complot and Viñetas and characters such as Makoki. Later, he opted for the biographical genre, with the publication of works such as Un largo silencio and the award-winning María y yo (Maria and Me). In 1982, thanks to the popularity of the character, the short-lived magazine Makoki appeared, of which Gallardo and Mediavilla were the directors and in which they published the story Makoki in New York, considered by critics to be inferior to their previous works.

In 2009, he published with Paco Roca Emotional World Tour, where they tell the anecdotes related to the promotion of their latest comics. In 2011, he illustrated the first two covers of the new war feats.

Gallardo died on 21 February 2022, at the age of 66.

== Awards and nominations ==
- 2008 Premio Haxtur for "Best Cover Art" for "María y yo"
- 2008 Nominated for Premio Haxtur of "Best Short Story" for "María y yo" at the Salón Internacional del Cómic del Principado de Asturias Gijón
- In 2013, Gallardo was awarded the Gráffica Prize, together with Alex Trochut, Álvaro Sobrino, América Sánchez, Andreu Balius, Astiberri, Atipo, Clara Montagut, Jaime Serra y No-Domain.
