= América Sánchez =

Argentinian graphic designer and photographer

América Sánchez (born 1939) is an Argentinian graphic designer and photographer. Born in Buenos Aires, he moved to Barcelona in 1965.

His work is included in the collections of the Museum of Fine Arts Houston and the Museum of Modern Art, New York.

== Influence and recognition ==
Sánchez is renowned for his photomontage works, which combine photography and graphic design to create unique visual compositions. His work is influenced by Pop Art, comics, graffiti, and Art Brut, reflecting a diverse range of artistic styles. Sánchez has also contributed to the field of design education, teaching at the EINA Centre Universitario de Disseny i Art de Barcelona and other institutions. He has received several awards, including the Premio Nacional de Diseño and the Premio Ciutat de Barcelona

== Selected exhibitions ==
- 1980 "Iconografía moderna", fotomontajes de America Sanchez, MACBA, Barcelona
- 2016 America Sanchez. Romanesque portraits. Ink on paper, Museu Nacional d'Art de Catalunya
