= Valmojado =

- Municipality
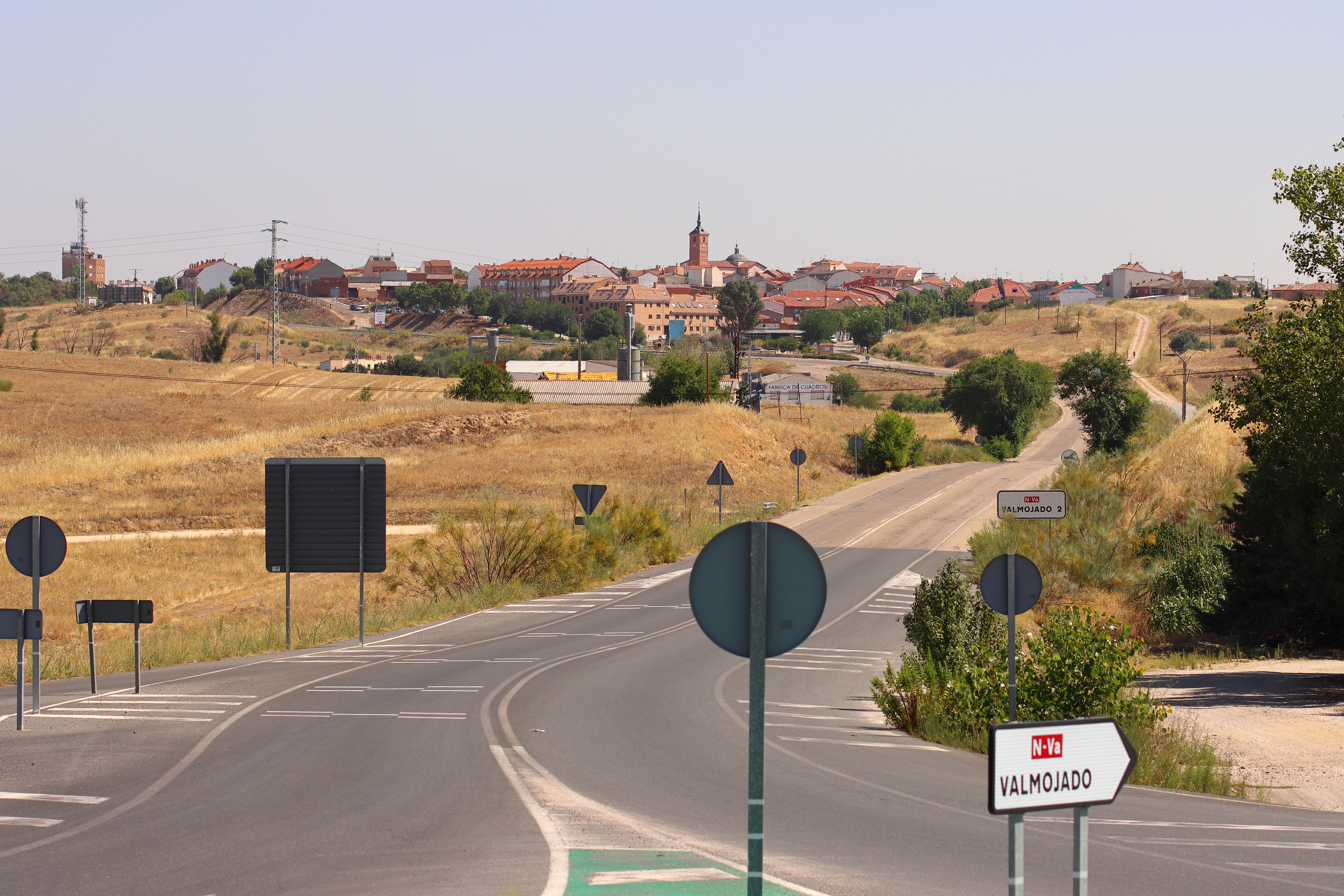

- Flag Coat of arms

- Location in Spain
- Coordinates: 40°12′16″N 4°5′28″W
- Country: Spain
- Autonomous community: Castile-La Mancha
- Province: Toledo

Area
  - Total: 26 km^{2} (10 sq mi)
- Elevation: 661 m (2,169 ft)

Population (2025-01-01)
  - Total: 4,898
  - Density: 190/km^{2} (490/sq mi)
- Time zone: UTC+1 (CET)
  - Summer (DST): UTC+2 (CEST)

Valmojado (Spanish: [balmoˈxaðo]) is a municipality located in the province of Toledo, Castile-La Mancha, Spain. According to the 2012 census (INE), it had a population of 4216 inhabitants.
