= Don Benito =

- Municipality
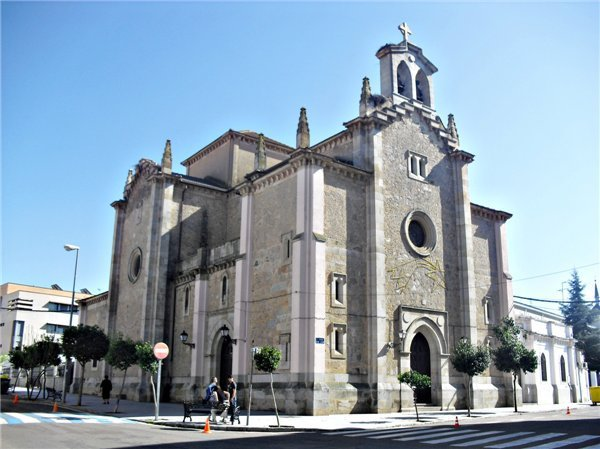
- Parish church of San Juan

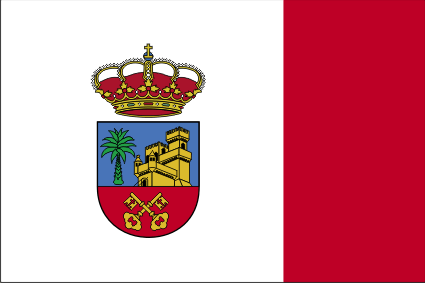
- Flag Coat of arms

- Location in Extremadura
- Coordinates: 38°57′16.3″N 5°51′42.2″W
- Country: Spain
- Autonomous Community: Extremadura
- Province: Badajoz
- Comarca: Las Vegas Altas
- Founded: 15th century

Government
  - Mayor: Jose Luis Quintana Álvarez (PSOE-Extremadura)

Area
  - Total: 5,616 km^{2} (2,168 sq mi)
- Elevation: 280 m (920 ft)

Population (2025-01-01)
  - Total: 37,986
  - Density: 6.764/km^{2} (17.52/sq mi)
- Time zone: UTC+1 (CET)
  - Summer (DST): UTC+2 (CEST (GMT +2))
- Postal code: 06400
- Area code: +34 (Spain) + 924 (Badajoz)
- Website: Official website

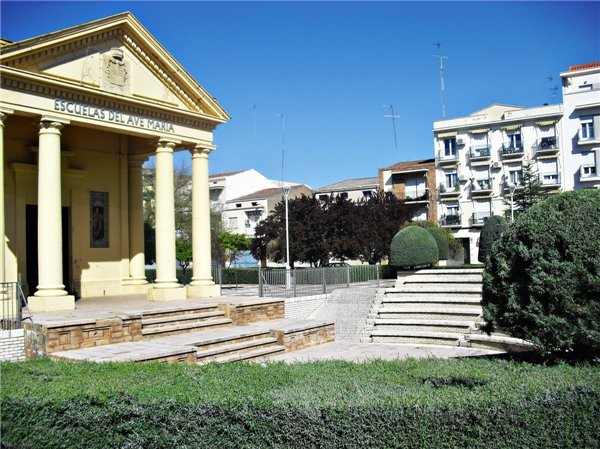
Ave María Amphitheatre

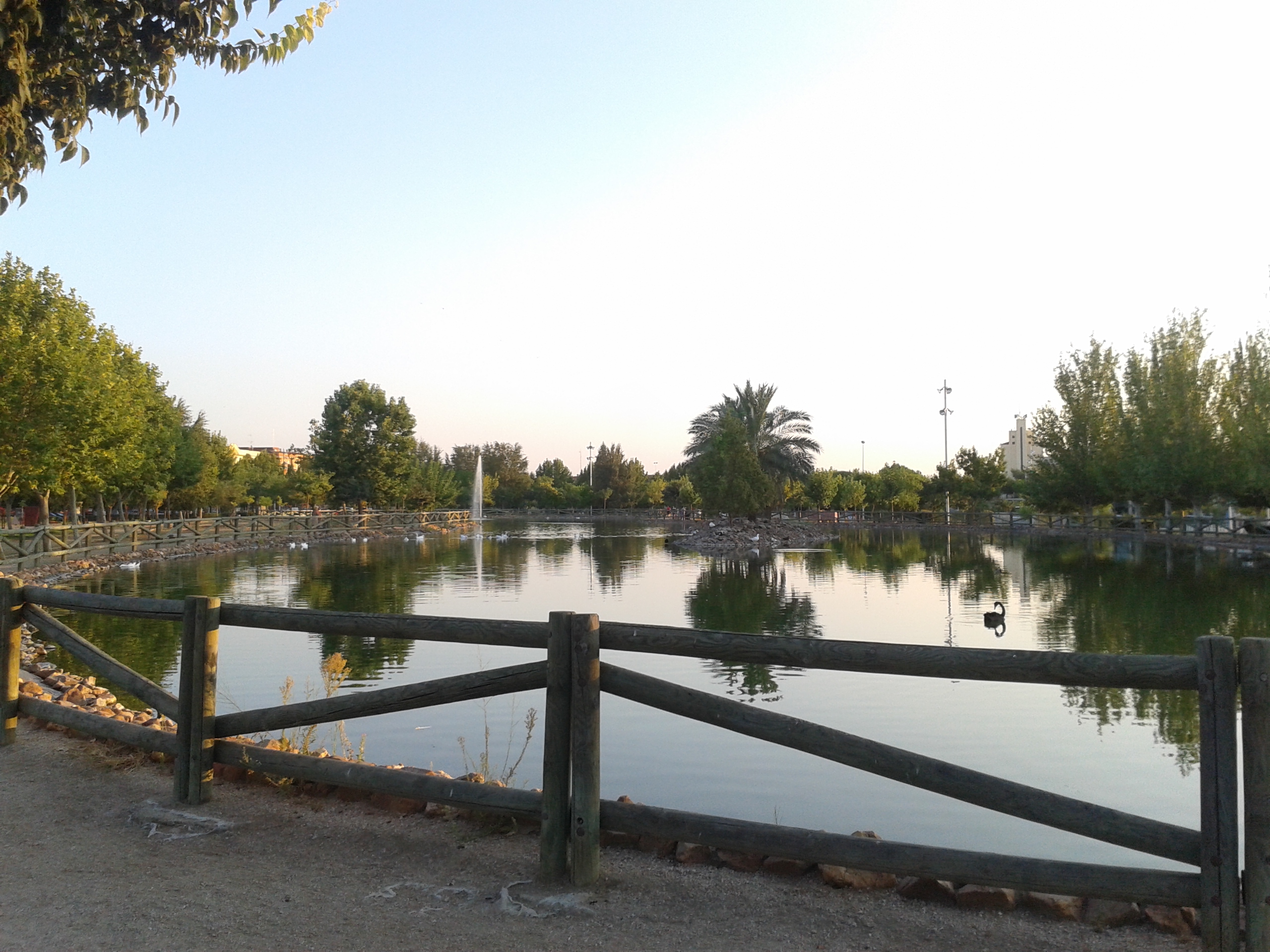
Las Albercas Park

Don Benito (Spanish pronunciation: [dom beˈnito]) is a Spanish town and municipality in the province of Badajoz, Extremadura, near the left bank of the river Guadiana. According to the 2014 census, the municipality has a population of 37,011.

== History ==
Don Benito dates from the 15th century, when it was founded by refugees from Don Llorente, who deserted their own town due to the danger of floods from the Guadiana.

On 28 March 1809, the 9 km separating Don Benito from Medellín was the site of a major French victory against Spanish troops during the Peninsular War.

By 2021, the municipal government of Don Benito worked alongside that of Villanueva de la Serena to fuse the two neighbouring municipalities into a single one, paving the way for a 2022 non-binding consultation. On 8 November 2021, the Council of Ministers sanctioned the celebration of the consultation, to be held on 20 February 2022. Both municipalities approved the merging, in the case of Don Benito by a whisker (a 66.2% of yes votes relative to the 66.0% threshold set in advance).

== Geography ==
Don Benito has 37,048 inhabitants, and is part of an urban area with Villanueva de la Serena (26,071 inhabitants) 5 km away.

The municipality is composed by the town of Don Benito and seven villages:

Settlement	Population (2012)
Don Benito	32,783
Conquista del Guadiana	133
Gargáligas	549
Hernán Cortés	921
Ruecas	718
El Torviscal	549
Valdehornillos	664
Vivares	731

=== Climate ===
Don Benito has a hot summer mediterranean climate (Köppen classification: Csa), bordering on a cold semi-arid climate (BSk). The winters are mild, although temperatures very occasionally drop below 0 °C (32 °F) during the coldest nights of the year. Summers are hot to very hot and temperatures often exceed 35 °C (95 °F) and occasionally exceed 40 °C (104 °F).

Precipitation is moderately scarce throughout the year, averaging 400 millimetres (16 in) annually. Autumn is the season with the most rainfall, while the summers are dry.

Climate data for Don Benito, 1991-2020 normals, extremes (1989-present)
Month	Jan	Feb	Mar	Apr	May	Jun	Jul	Aug	Sep	Oct	Nov	Dec	Year
Record high °C (°F)	21.8 (71.2)	25.0 (77.0)	29.7 (85.5)	37.3 (99.1)	39.5 (103.1)	42.9 (109.2)	44.1 (111.4)	43.7 (110.7)	42.3 (108.1)	35.8 (96.4)	26.1 (79.0)	22.0 (71.6)	44.1 (111.4)
Mean daily maximum °C (°F)	13.0 (55.4)	15.4 (59.7)	19.2 (66.6)	21.8 (71.2)	26.4 (79.5)	31.4 (88.5)	34.5 (94.1)	34.3 (93.7)	30.1 (86.2)	24.4 (75.9)	17.1 (62.8)	13.8 (56.8)	23.5 (74.2)
Daily mean °C (°F)	8.1 (46.6)	9.8 (49.6)	12.9 (55.2)	15.4 (59.7)	19.5 (67.1)	23.8 (74.8)	26.2 (79.2)	26.2 (79.2)	22.9 (73.2)	18.2 (64.8)	12.2 (54.0)	9.2 (48.6)	17.0 (62.7)
Mean daily minimum °C (°F)	3.1 (37.6)	4.1 (39.4)	6.6 (43.9)	9.0 (48.2)	12.5 (54.5)	16.1 (61.0)	17.9 (64.2)	18.2 (64.8)	15.7 (60.3)	12.0 (53.6)	7.2 (45.0)	4.7 (40.5)	10.6 (51.1)
Record low °C (°F)	−7.9 (17.8)	−5.3 (22.5)	−4.4 (24.1)	0.1 (32.2)	3.6 (38.5)	8.1 (46.6)	8.7 (47.7)	10.4 (50.7)	7.8 (46.0)	3.1 (37.6)	−2.4 (27.7)	−6.0 (21.2)	−7.9 (17.8)
Average rainfall mm (inches)	41.9 (1.65)	34.3 (1.35)	41.3 (1.63)	43.5 (1.71)	32.1 (1.26)	10.1 (0.40)	2.8 (0.11)	3.4 (0.13)	25.2 (0.99)	63.3 (2.49)	51.6 (2.03)	50.4 (1.98)	399.9 (15.73)
Average precipitation days (≥ 1 mm)	6.4	5.7	6.2	6.7	5.2	1.6	0.5	0.7	3.0	6.3	6.8	7.3	56.4
Source: Agencia Estatal de Meteorologia (AEMET OpenData)

== Transport ==
The town is served by a railway station on the Ciudad Real-Badajoz railway, part of an international line that links Madrid with Lisbon. It has been interested, along with the nearby Villanueva de la Serena, by a project of a tramway, not yet finalized. The town is also the southern terminus of the EXA2 motorway from Miajadas.

== Famous residents ==
- Florinda Chico (1926-2011), actress
- Jesús Gil Manzano (b. 1984), referee
- Juanma Gómez (b. 1981), footballer
- Pedro Porro (b. 1999), footballer

== Twin towns ==
- Fquih Ben Salah, Morocco

== See also ==
- List of municipalities in Badajoz
