= Miguel Ángel Gallardo (politician) =

Spanish politician (born 1974)

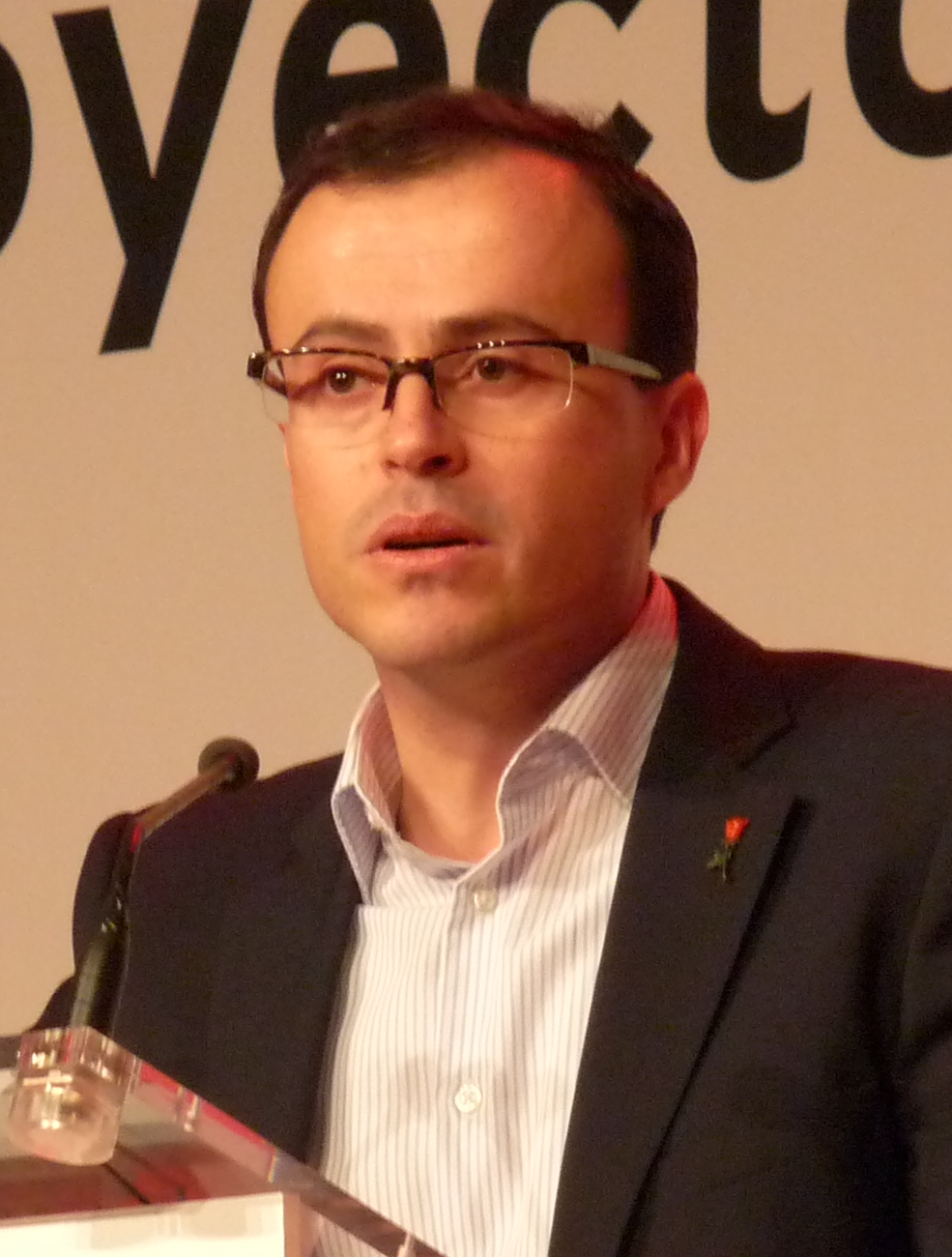

Miguel Ángel Gallardo Miranda (born 8 June 1974) is a Spanish Socialist Workers' Party (PSOE) politician. He was the mayor of his hometown of Villanueva de la Serena from 2003 to 2024, when he was elected secretary general of the PSOE in Extremadura. He led the party in the 2025 Extremaduran regional election, where they lost ten seats in their worst election to the Assembly of Extremadura. He resigned his leadership and did not take his seat. In 2026, due to a scandal in which a public sector job was created for the brother of prime minister Pedro Sánchez, he was banned from public office for 18 years.

== Biography ==
Born in Villanueva de la Serena in Extremadura, Gallardo is married and has two children as of 2024. He is qualified in electronic maintenance, infant education and social education, the last of those being a degree from the National University of Distance Education (UNED). He joined the Spanish Socialist Workers' Party (PSOE) in 1995, and was secretary general of the Socialist Youth of Spain (JSE) in his hometown from 1996 to 2003.

Gallardo was elected mayor of his hometown in May 2003, when he was 28, ending eight years of his party being in opposition. He remained in office until March 2024, serving six terms with absolute majorities in each. In 2015, he became president of the provincial deputation of the Province of Badajoz.

As mayor of Villanueva de la Serena, Gallardo proposed a municipal merger with nearby Don Benito, thus forming a city of 65,000 that would be the third-biggest in the region after Badajoz and Cáceres. The proposal was backed by 91% of voters in his city and 66% of voters in the other, as well as Don Benito mayor José Luis Quintana Álvarez. The plan was scrapped in 2023 when a localist party opposed to the merger won the mayoralty of Don Benito, with support from the People's Party (PP).

In March 2024, Gallardo was elected leader of the Spanish Socialist Workers' Party of Extremadura with 56.2% of the vote against Lara Garlito, who had the endorsement of the PSOE's central leadership including prime minister of Spain Pedro Sánchez. When the President of the Regional Government of Extremadura, María Guardiola of the PP, called an early election for December 2025, Gallardo led the PSOE. His party fell from 28 seats to 18, its worst ever result in Extremadura; France 24 attributed the result to national corruption and sexual harassment scandals surrounding the party. Gallardo himself was implicated in the accusations, facing a trial on allegations of creating a job specifically for Sánchez's brother David.

Gallardo resigned as leader after the election, with Quintana taking over a managing commission until an extraordinary congress to name the new leader. On 14 January 2026, six days before he was due to be sworn in, he announced that he would not take his seat in the parliament, and would therefore not have parliamentary immunity from his legal issues. On 14 July, Gallardo was convicted of two counts of misconduct in a public office and was banned for 18 years from public sector employment or standing for election; David Sánchez was banned for nine years. In September he launched an appeal, hoping to limit his prohibitions only to the provincial deputation.
