= Salorino, Cáceres =

Coordinates: 39°29′N 7°00′W

Salorino, Spain
- municipality
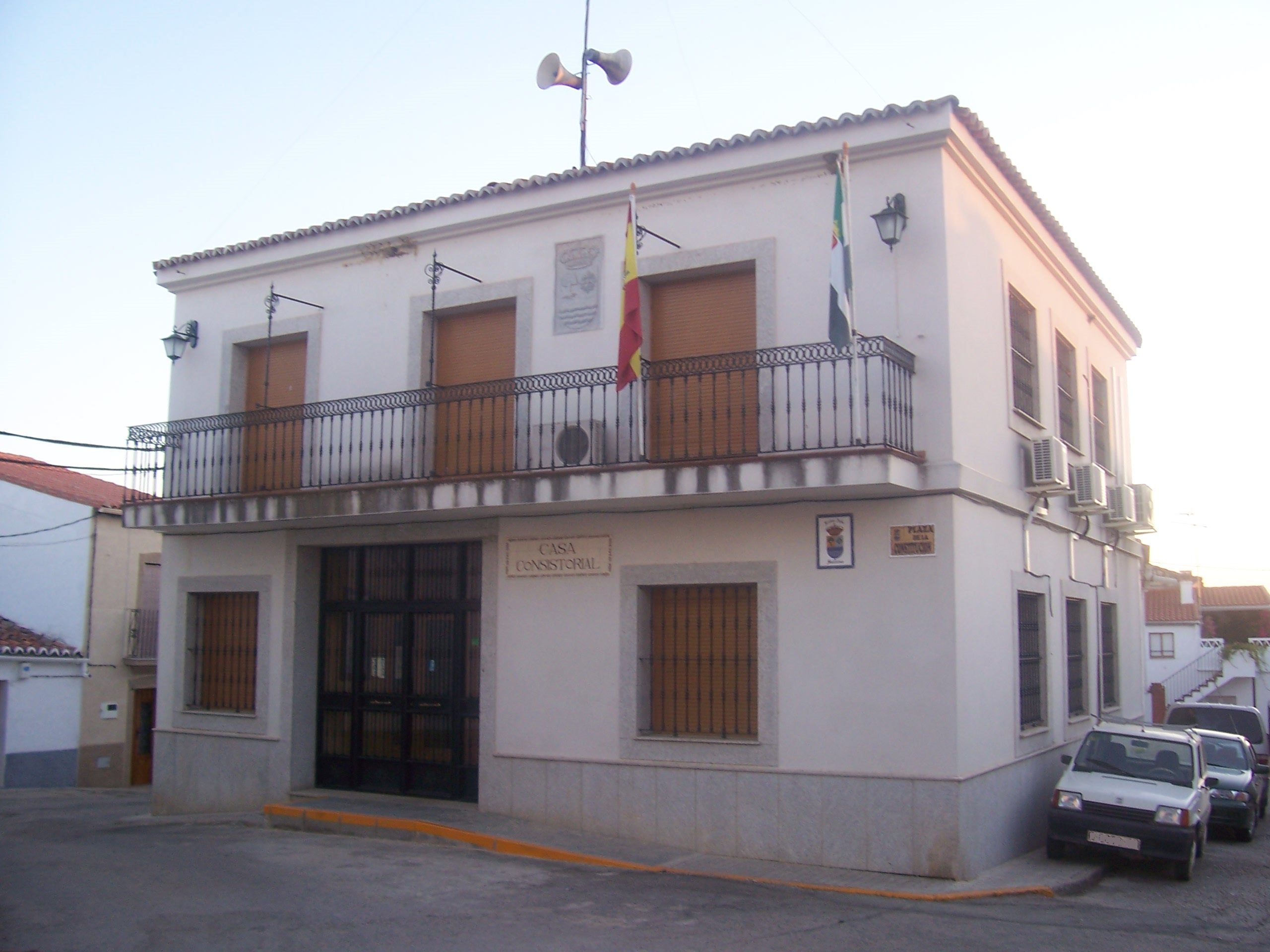

- Flag Coat of arms
- Interactive map of Salorino, Spain
- Country: Spain
- Autonomous community: Extremadura
- Province: Cáceres
- Municipality: Salorino

Area
  - Total: 157 km^{2} (61 sq mi)

Population (2025-01-01)
  - Total: 522
  - Density: 3.32/km^{2} (8.61/sq mi)
- Time zone: UTC+1 (CET)
  - Summer (DST): UTC+2 (CEST)

Salorino is a municipality located in the province of Cáceres, Extremadura, Spain. It is located in the southwest of the province, south of the River Salor. According to the 2006 census (INE), the municipality has a population of 743 inhabitants.

== See also ==
- List of municipalities in Cáceres
