= Villanueva de la Serena =

- City
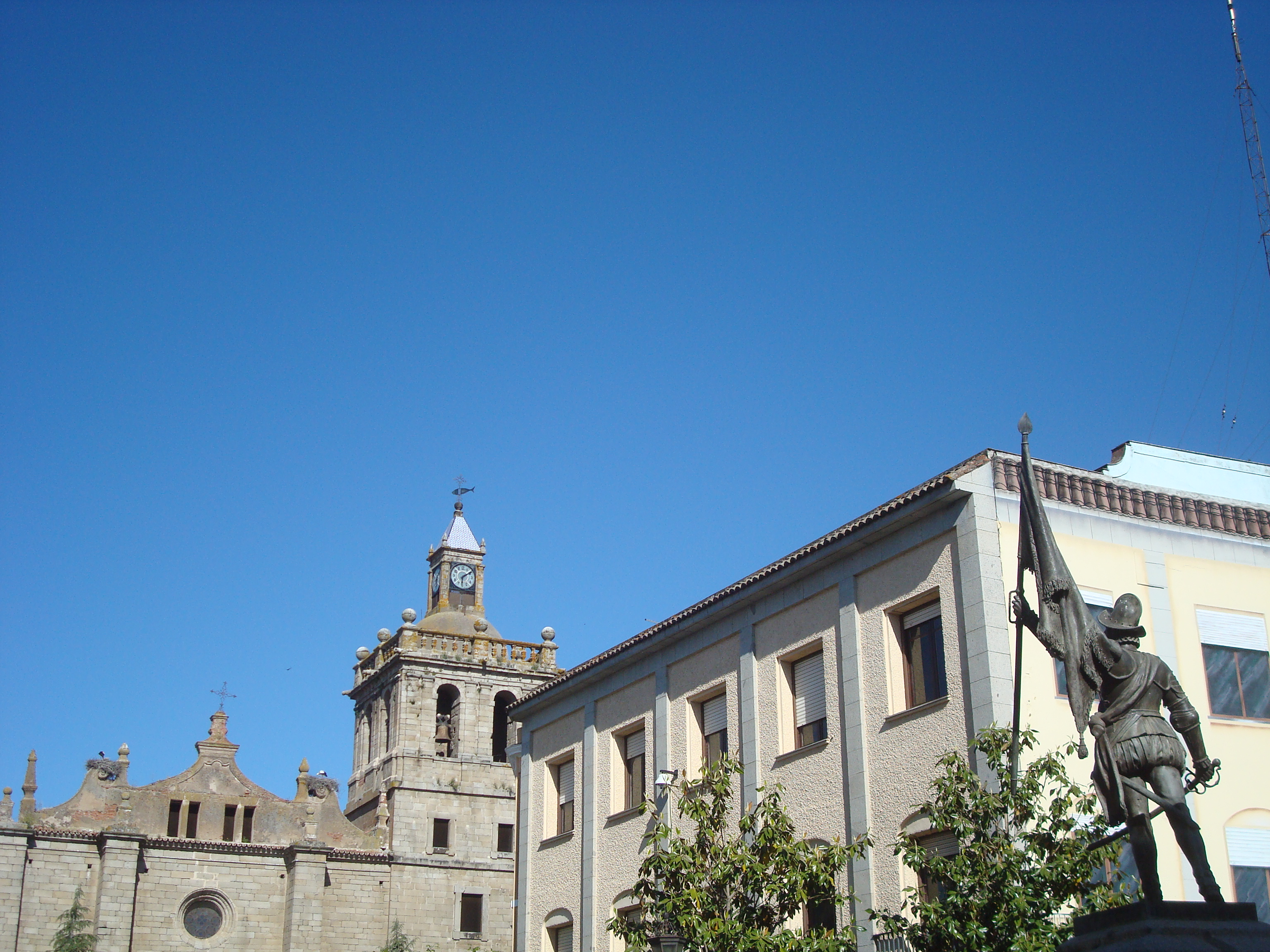
- City plaza with statue of Pedro de Valdivia

- Flag Coat of arms
- Nickname: La Villa (the village)
- Motto: Puerta soy de La Serena (I am the gate of La Serena)
- Location in Spain.
- Coordinates: 38°58′26″N 5°48′1″W

Government
  - Mayor: Miguel Ángel Mirando Gallardas (PSOE)

Area
  - Total: 152 km^{2} (59 sq mi)
- Elevation: 280 m (920 ft)

Population (2025-01-01)
  - Total: 25,773
- Website: www.villanuevadelaserena.es

Villanueva de la Serena (Spanish: [bi.ʎaˈnwe.βa ðe la seˈɾe.na]) is a city in the Province of Badajoz, Extremadura, Spain. It has a population of 26,111 (2010) and forms part of a larger urban area with the neighbouring town of Don Benito.

== History ==
Founded in the thirteenth century as Aldeanueva de Medellín, the city was an important centre for the Mesta in the Middle Ages. It was the birthplace of Pedro de Valdivia who conquered Chile for the Spanish crown.

By 2021, the municipal government of Villanueva de la Serena worked alongside that of Don Benito to fuse the two neighbouring municipalities into a single one, paving the way for a 2022 non-binding consultation. On 8 November 2021, the Council of Ministers sanctioned the celebration of the consultation, to be held on 20 February 2022. Both municipalities approved the merging, in the case of Villanueva de la Serena by an overwhelming 90.49% of yes votes (well over the 66.0% threshold set in advance).

== Location ==
Located in the county of Vegas Altas, Villanueva itself is the main gate of La Serena, another county of Extremadura to which it historically belongs. It is separated by only 5 km from Don Benito, forming Villanueva de la Serena-Don Benito, an urban agglomeration of around 60.000 inhabitants, making one of the most important agricultural, industrial and services centres in Extremadura. Mérida (capital of Extremadura) and Badajoz (biggest city in the region) are respectively 58 and 116 km from Villanueva de la Serena.

The natural trail (green way) of Vegas del Guadiana or "Vía Verde de las Vegas del Guadiana y las Villuercas" begins in this city.

== Data ==
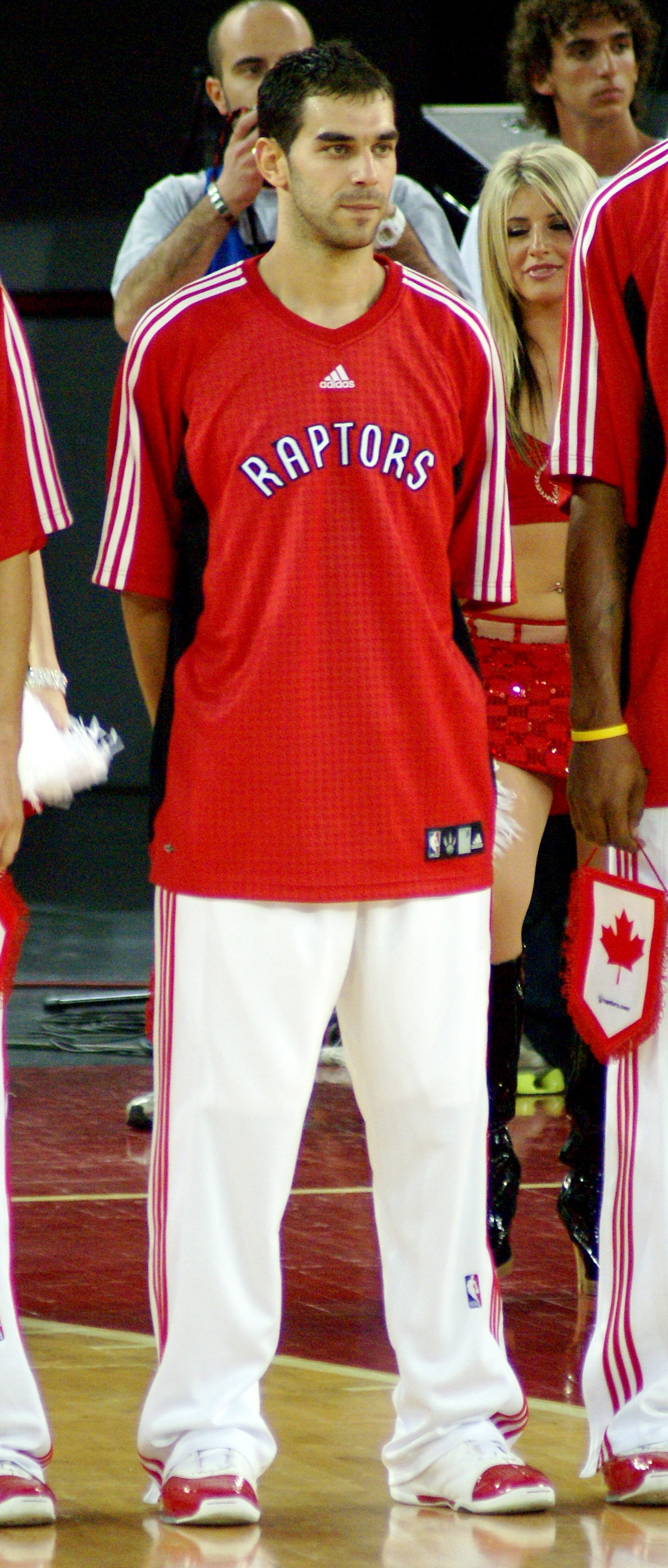
José Manuel Calderón, first NBA player from the community of Extremadura.

Former NBA player José Calderón was born in Villanueva de la Serena.

Pedro Gutiérrez de Valdivia was a Spanish conquistador and the first royal governor of Chile.

La Carrerita, a festivity of cultural interest, is celebrated in this city every last Sunday in the Easter week.

The local football club is CF Villanovense.

== See also ==
- List of municipalities in Badajoz
