= Miajadas =

- Municipality
- Flag Coat of arms

- Location in Spain
- Coordinates: 39°9′10″N 5°54′29″W
- Country: Spain
- Autonomous Community: Extremadura
- Province: Cáceres
- Comarca: Tierra de Trujillo

Government
  - Mayor: Juan Luis Isidro Girón

Area
  - Total: 120.7 km^{2} (46.6 sq mi)
- Elevation (AMSL): 297 m (974 ft)

Population (2025-01-01)
  - Total: 9,396
  - Density: 77.85/km^{2} (201.6/sq mi)
- Time zone: UTC+1 (CET)
  - Summer (DST): UTC+2 (CEST (GMT +2))
- Postal code: 10100
- Area code: +34 (Spain) + 927 (Cáceres)
- Website: www.miajadas.es

Miajadas (Spanish: [mjaˈxaðas]) is a municipality located in the province of Cáceres, Extremadura, Spain. According to the 2005 census (INE), the municipality has a population of 10,107.

== See also ==
- List of municipalities in Cáceres
