= Regional Government of Extremadura =

Government of Extremadura
- Junta de Extremadura

Overview
- Established: 17 July 2023; 2 years ago
- Polity: Extremadura
- Leader: María Guardiola
- Main organ: Board of Extremadura
- Ministries: 6
- Responsible to: Assembly of Extremadura
- Headquarters: Conventual Santiaguista, Mérida
- Website: www.juntaex.es

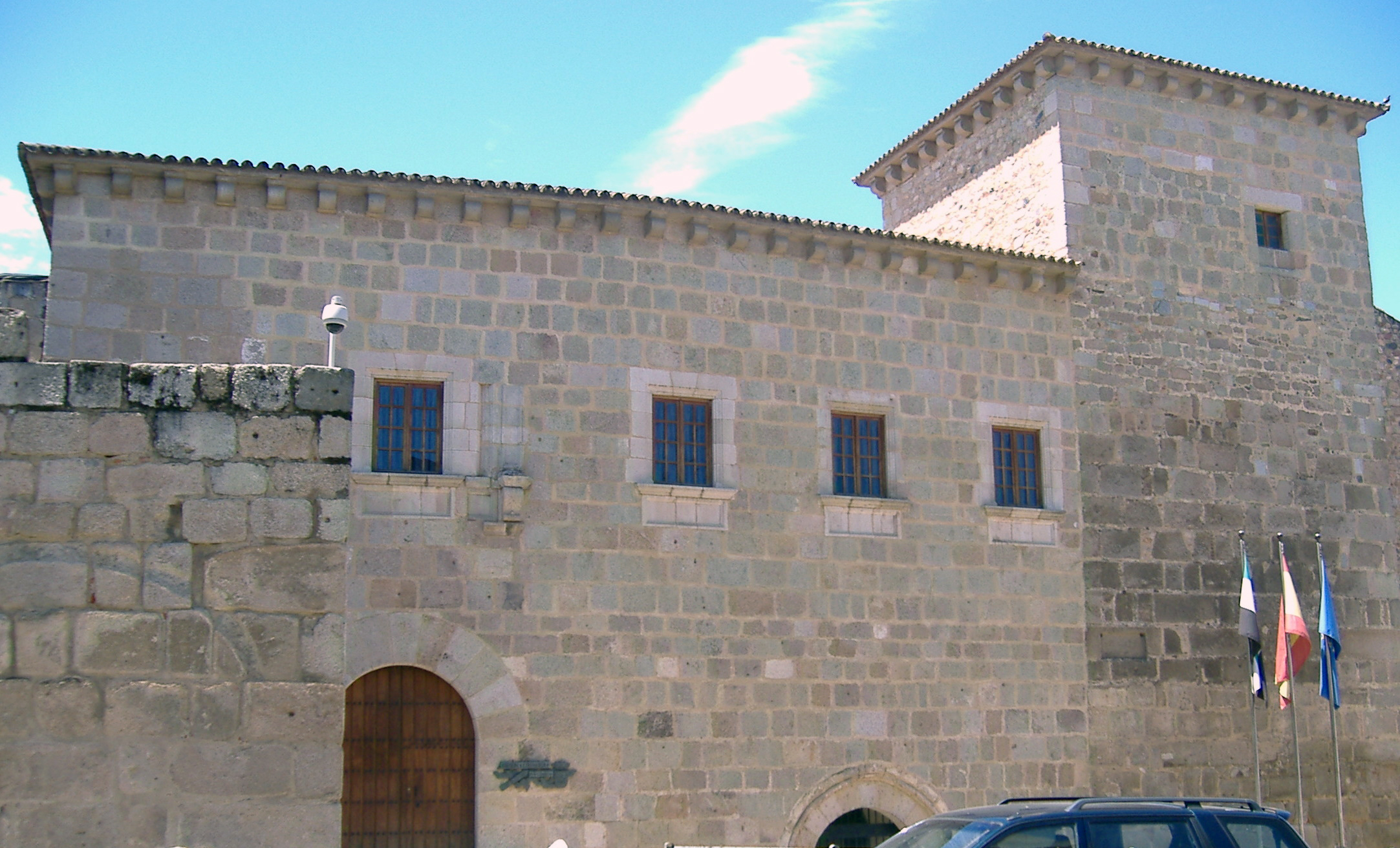
Presidencia Junta de Extremadura

The regional Government of Extremadura (Spanish: Junta de Extremadura) is the group of institutions ruling the Spanish autonomous community of Extremadura.

== Structure ==
It is headed by the President of the Regional Government of Extremadura, a position currently held by María Guardiola of the People's Party. She is trying to form a new government after elections on December 21, 2025. Its legislative branch is the unicameral Assembly of Extremadura. Executive functions are performed by seven ministries (Consejerías).

The Board of Extremadura comprises the President, Vice President or Vice Presidents and regional ministers. Each minister is in charge of one Ministry and is freely appointed and dismissed by the President, reporting to the Assembly.

== Function ==
In accordance with the President's general guidelines, the government establishes policy and directs the administration of the Autonomous Region, exercising its executive and regulatory powers under the Spanish Constitution and the Statute of Extremadura. Their headquarters are in Mérida, capital of Extremadura, in accordance with Article 5 of the Statute of Autonomy.
