= Autovía A-63 =

Motorway in Spain

Autovía A-63
- Autovía Oviedo-La Espina

Route information
- Length: 71 km (44 mi)

Major junctions
- From: Oviedo
- To: La Espina

Location
- Country: Spain

Highway system
- Highways in Spain; Autopistas and autovías; National Roads

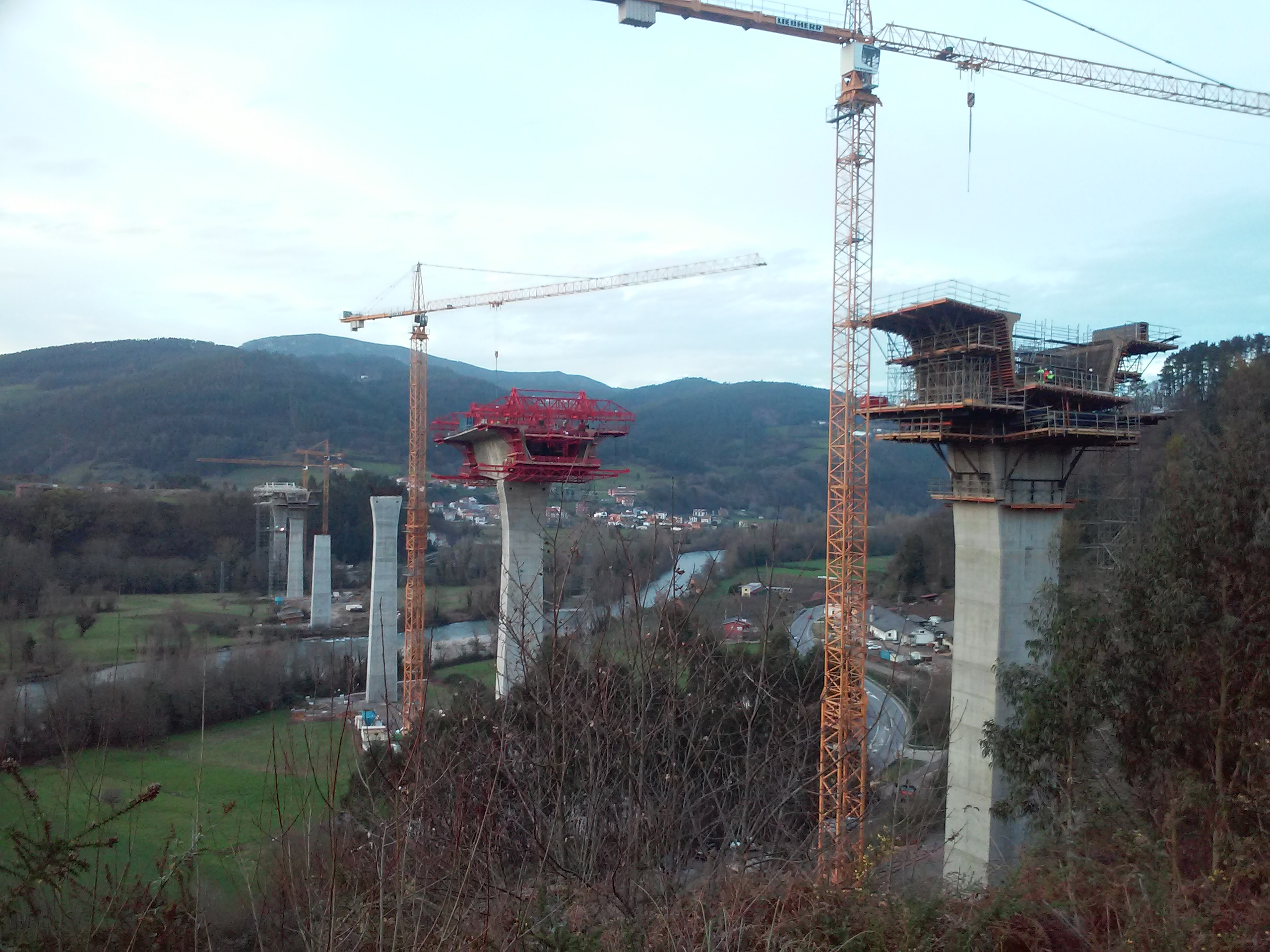
Construction of the viaduct over Narcea river.

The Autovía A-63 is a highway in Asturias, Spain. Once completed, it will connect the provincial capital, Oviedo, with La Espina; currently it only connects Oviedo and Cornellana, with half of the carriageway built from Salas to La Espina. It follows the N-634. The possibility of adding a section to Canero, which would connect the road to the A-8, is currently being studied.

== Sections ==
| Name | Section | Status (2018) | Length (km) | Year of creation |
|---|---|---|---|---|
| A-63 | A-66 – Latores | In service | 4.1 | 1999 |
| A-63 | Latores – Trubia | In service | 5.7 | 2003 |
| A-63 | Trubia – La Llera | In service | 4.3 | 2005 |
| A-63 | La Llera – Grado | In service | 8.7 | |
| A-63 | Ring road of Grado | In service | 2.0 | |
| A-63 | Grado – Dóriga | In service | 4.0 | |
| A-63 | Dóriga – Cornellana | In service | 2.4 | |
| N-634 | Cornellana – Salas | Works | 7.3 | |
| N-634 | Salas – La Espina (first carriageway) | In service | 12.0 | |
| N-634 | Salas – La Espina (second carriageway) | Works contract rescinded | 11.7 | |
| N-634 | La Espina – Canero | Under study | 23.0 | |
