= Miera =

Miera may refer to:

== Places ==
- Miera, New Mexico, U.S., a ghost town
- Miera, Spain, a municipality in Cantabria
- Miera River, in Cantabria, Spain
- Miera (Salas), a parish in Asturias, Spain

== People ==
- Álvaro López Miera (born 1943), Cuban military and political leader
- Bernardo de Miera y Pacheco (1713–1785), Spanish cartographer and artist in New Spain
- Ramón Ortiz y Miera (1814–1896), Mexican priest and nationalist
- Rick Miera (born 1951), American politician in New Mexico
- Vicente de Soliveres y Miera (c. 1838 – c. 1908), mayor of Ponce, Puerto Rico, 1898–1899
- Vicente Miera (born 1940), Spanish football defender and manager
