= Villazón (disambiguation) =

Villazón may refer to:

== Places ==
- Villazón, town and municipality in Modesto Omiste Province, Bolivia
- Villazón (Salas), parish in Asturias, Spain

== People ==
- Edgardo José Maya Villazón (born 1951), Colombian lawyer
- Eliodoro Villazón (1848–1939), Bolivian politician and President
- Iván Villazón (born 1959), Colombian singer
- Rolando Villazón (born 1972), Mexican opera singer
