= N-634 road (Spain) =

Highway in northern Spain

National road N-634
- Carretera nacional N-634

Route information
- Length: 736 km (457 mi)

Major junctions
- From: Santiago de Compostela
- To: San Sebastián

Location
- Country: Spain

Highway system
- Highways in Spain; Autopistas and autovías; National Roads

The N-634 is a highway in northern Spain. It connects Santiago de Compostela with San Sebastián.

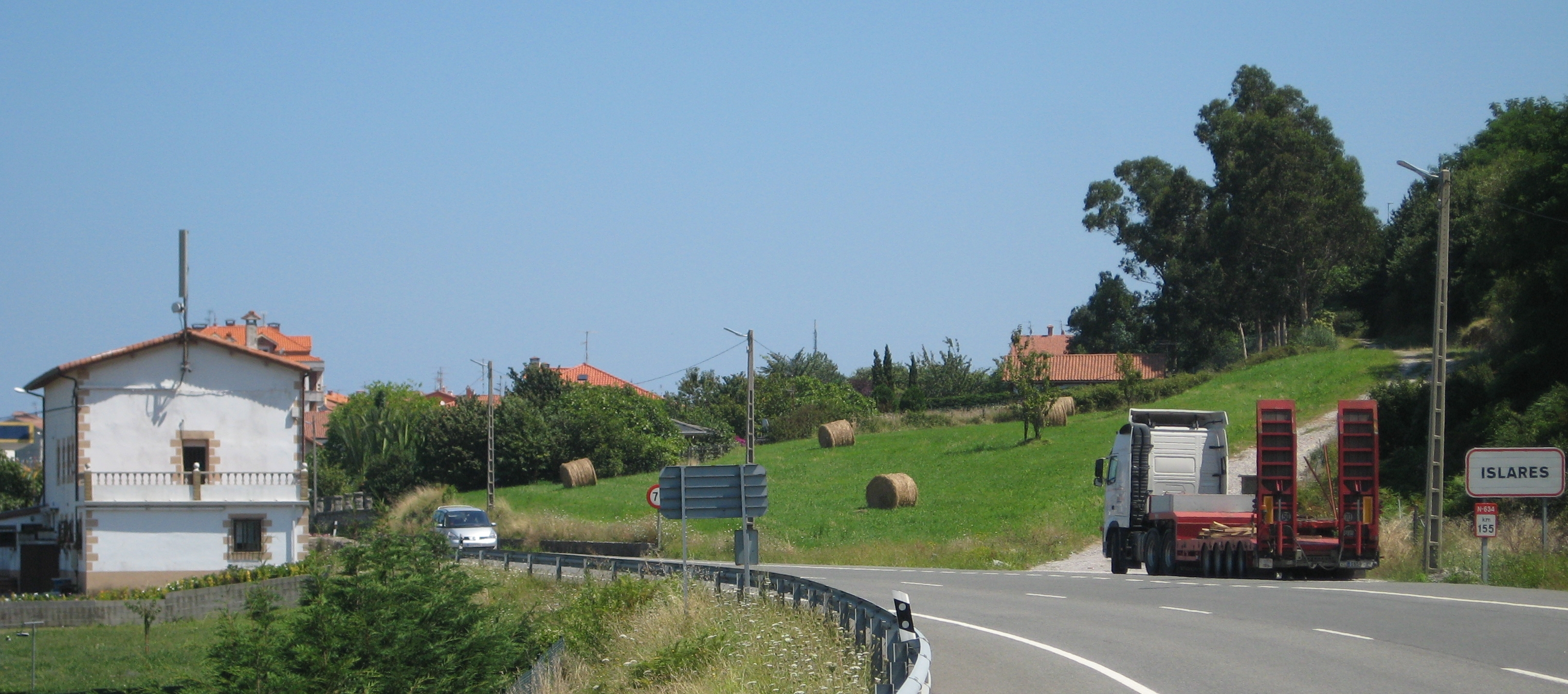
In Islares, Cantabria

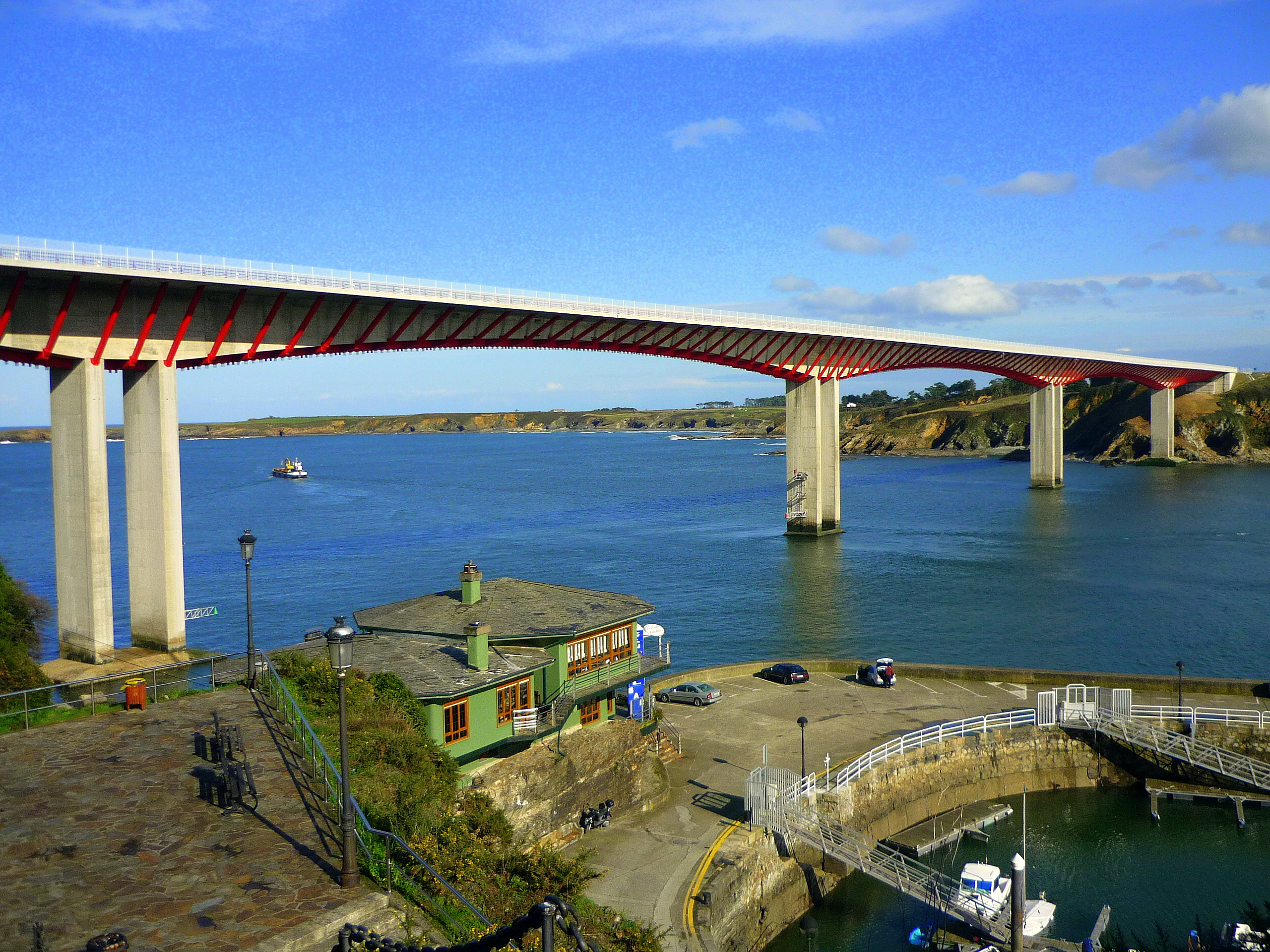
Bridge between Asturias and Galicia, over the Eo river

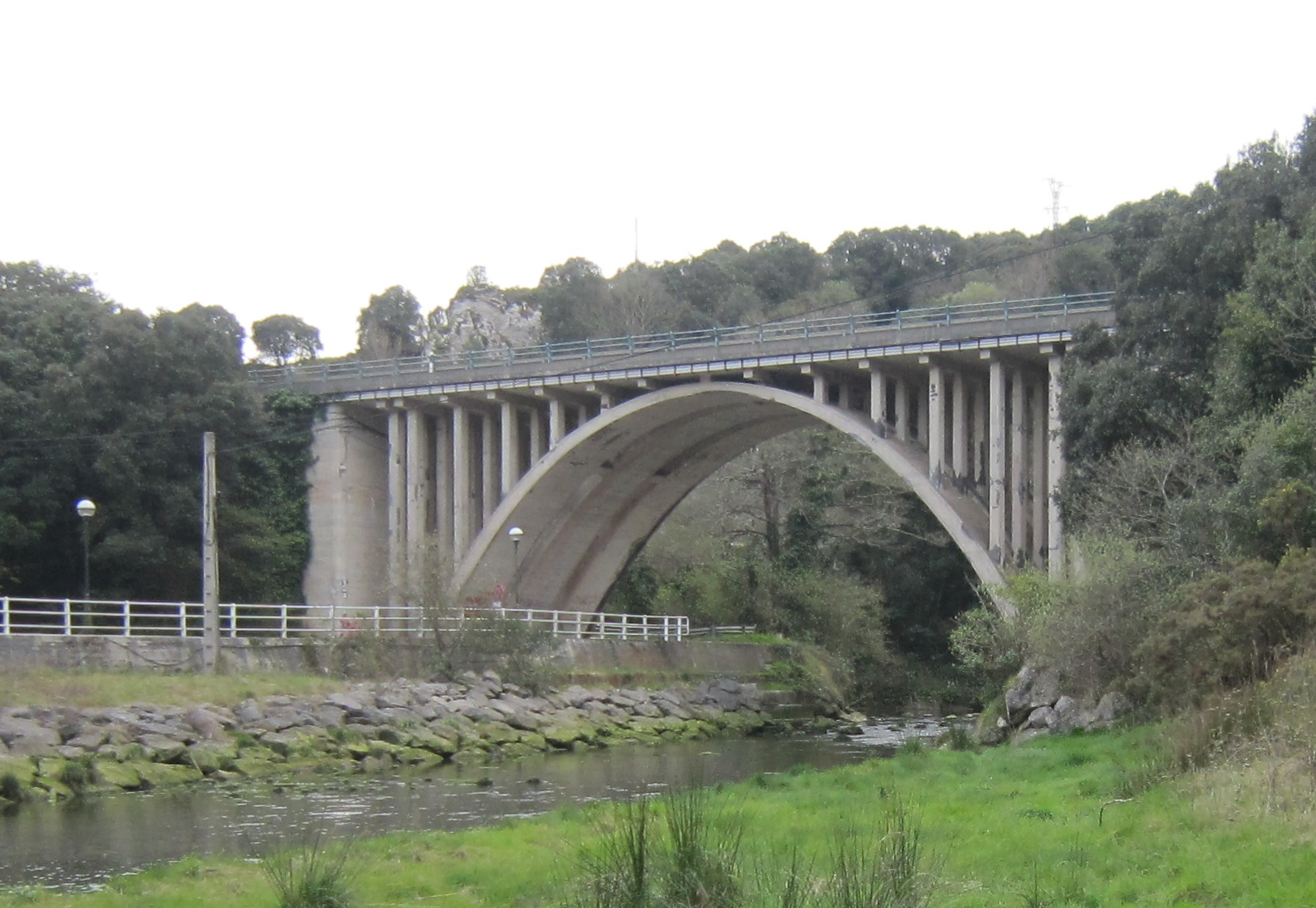
N-634 bridge in Ribadedeva, Asturias

It starts at Santiago de Compostela at a junction with the N-550.and crosses the Autopista AP-9 heading north east. There is a junction with the N-547. The road meets junction 140 with the Autovía A-6. After 17 km the road splits and heads north passing Vilalba. The road then climbs to cross the Porto da Xesta (545m) before dropping into Mondoñedo. The road follows the Rio Misma to the coast and a junction with the N-642.

The road turns east along the coast through Ribadeo where it meets the N-640. After Luarca the road turns south and inland while the N-632 continues along the coast. The road rises steeply to La Espina and then turns east past Salas. The road has been upgraded to the Autovía A-63 after Grado into Oviedo.

The road commences again east of Oviedo at junction 14 of the Autovía A-64 passing along the Piloña valley. The road passes Arriondas before joining the Autovía A-8 (junction 326). The A-8 is an upgrade of the original road running along the coast and re-emerges between Llanes and San Vicente de la Barquera. Thereafter the N-634 runs parallel to the motorway until Torrelavega and links with the Autovía A-67 and the N-623 road. The road then loops south east before again running parallel to the A-8.

The road has been downgraded but enters Bilbao. It then has a junction with the N-240. It runs parallel to the A8 rejoining the coast at Deba. It runs along the coast through Zarautz before reaching San Sebastián and a junction with N-1 road.
