= Santiagu la Barca =

Santiagu la Barca is one of 28 parishes (administrative divisions) in Salas, a municipality within the province and autonomous community of Asturias, in northern Spain.

It is 1.72 km^{2} (0.66 sq mi) in size, with a population of 39.

== Villages ==
- El Rubial
- Requeixu (43.366667°N 6.15°W)
- Santiagu
