= Villamar (Salas) =

Coordinates: 43.416667°N 6.233333°W

Villamar is one of 28 parishes (administrative divisions) in Salas, a municipality within the province and autonomous community of Asturias, in northern Spain.

It is 3.02 km^{2} (1.17 sq mi) in size, with a population of 161.

== Villages and hamlets ==
- Villamar de Baxu
- Villamar de Riba
- Zorrina
