= Salas (parish) =

Coordinates: 43.4°N 6.266667°W

Salas is one of 28 parishes (administrative divisions) in Salas, a municipality within the province and autonomous community of Asturias, in northern Spain.

It is 6.68 km^{2} (2.58 sq mi) in size, with a population of 1,600 (INE 2006).

Salas is on the Camino Primitvo path of the Camino de Santiago.

== Villages ==
- Maecín
- Salas
- Samartín
