= Llinares (Salas) =

Parish in Asturias, Spain

Coordinates: 43.45°N 6.216667°W

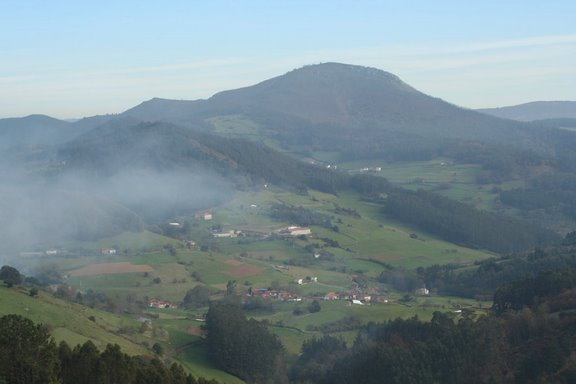
View of Linares

Llinares (Linares in Spanish) is one of 28 parishes (administrative divisions) in Salas, a municipality within the province and autonomous community of Asturias, in northern Spain.

It is 7.68 km^{2} (2.97 sq mi) in size, with a population of 111.

== Villages ==
- L'Escobiu
- Folgueiru
- La Bouría
- La Casona
- La Estrada
- La Piñella
- La Veiga
- Las Campas
- San Andrés
- Villar
- Villeirín
