= Maeza =

Coordinates: 43.466667°N 6.216667°W

Maeza (Spanish Malleza) is one of 28 parishes (administrative divisions) in Salas, a municipality within the province and autonomous community of Asturias, in northern Spain.

It is 23.25 km^{2} (8.98 sq mi) in size, with a population of 420.

== Villages ==
- Acebéu
- Borducéu
- Brañaivente
- Colubréu
- Coriscáu
- El Cándanu
- El Pumar
- Gallineiru
- L'Arquera
- La Barraca
- La Folgueirosa
- La Granxa
- Llindemurias
- Los Rubieiros
- Maeza
- Montenuevu
- San Cristóbal
- Villeirín
- Zreizal
