= San Esteban de la Dóriga =

Coordinates: 43.416667°N 6.133333°W

San Esteban de la Dóriga is one of 28 parishes (administrative divisions) in Salas, a municipality within the province and autonomous community of Asturias, in northern Spain.

It is 5.6 km^{2} (2.2 sq mi) in size, with a population of 167.

== Villages ==
- Bulse
- Eiros
- El Castiellu
- La Rodriga
- Reconcu
- San Esteban
- Villar
