= Aciana =

Aciana (San Vicente in Spanish) is one of 28 parishes (administrative divisions) in Salas, a municipality within the province and autonomous community of Asturias, in northern Spain.

It is 7.79 km^{2} (3.01 sq mi) in size, with a population of 174.

== Villages ==
- Aciana
- Casandresín
- Fontanos
- La Fistiella
- Poles (43.4°N 6.266667°W)
