= Godán =

Parish of the Asturian Council of Salas, Spain

Coordinates: 43.383333°N 6.25°W

Godán is one of 28 parishes (administrative divisions) in Salas, a municipality within the province and autonomous community of Asturias, in northern Spain.

It is 10.42 km^{2} (4.02 sq mi) in size, with a population of 219.

== Villages ==
- Ablaneda
- Godán
- L'Artosa
- La Barrosa
- La Sala
- Outeiru
- Reguerascura
