= Alava (Salas) =

Parish in Spain

Coordinates: 43.366667°N 6.2°W

Alava is one of 28 parishes (administrative divisions) in Salas, a municipality within the province and autonomous community of Asturias, in northern Spain.

It is 4.86 km^{2} (1.88 sq mi) in size, with a population of 51 (INE 2005).

== Villages ==
- Alava
- Bárcena
