= Soutu los Infantes =

Coordinates: 43.366667°N 6.266667°W

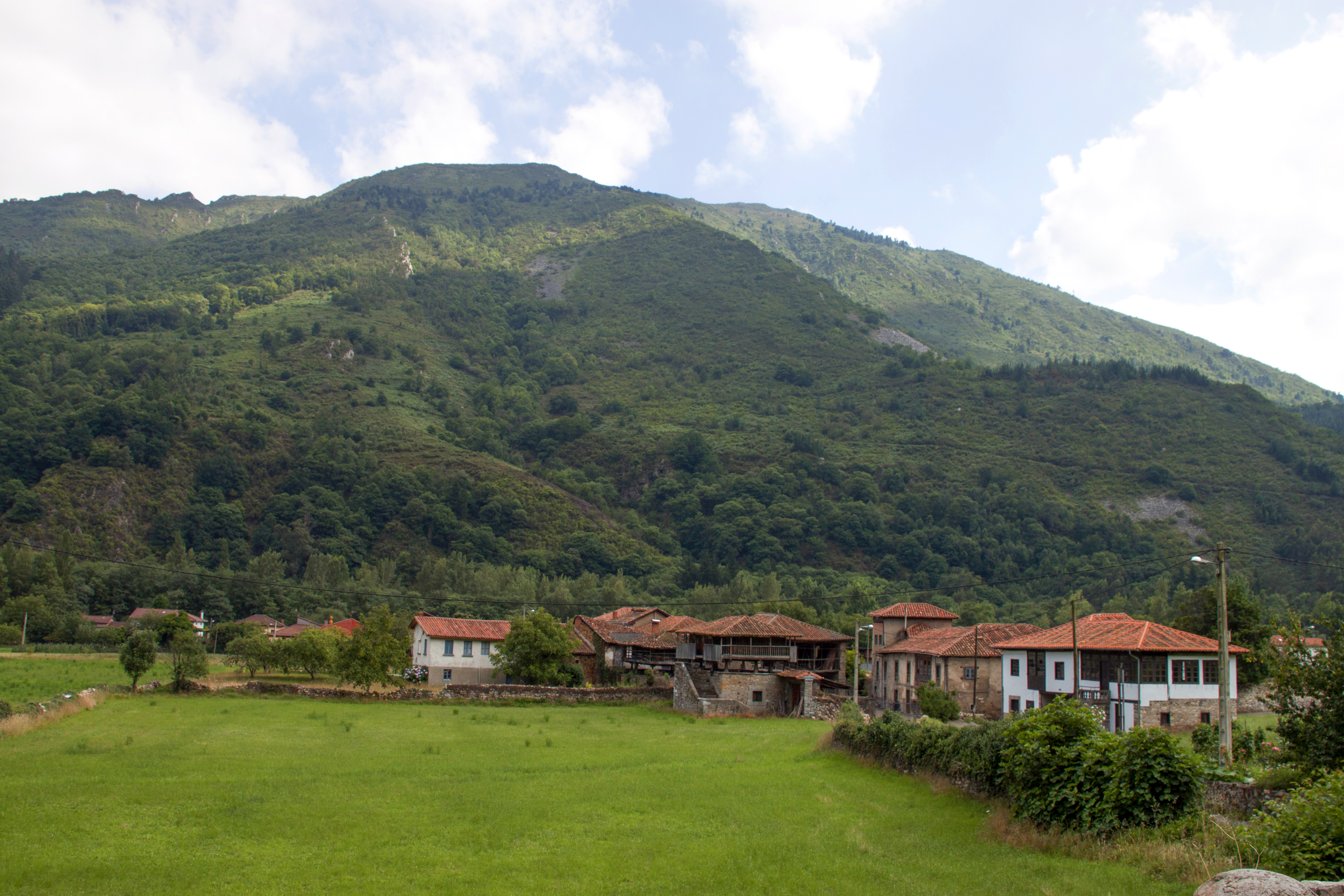
Soto de los Infantes (Salas, Asturias)

Soutu los Infantes is one of 28 parishes (administrative divisions) in Salas, a municipality within the province and autonomous community of Asturias, in northern Spain.

It is 14.36 km^{2} (5.54 sq mi) in size, with a population of 116. The elevation is 120 m (390 ft) above sea level.

== Villages and hamlets ==
- Arbodas
- La Escosura
- La Veiga
- Lleirosu
- Silvouta
- Soutu
