= Viescas =

Coordinates: 43.366667°N 6.25°W

Viescas is one of 28 parishes (administrative divisions) in Salas, a municipality within the province and autonomous community of Asturias, in northern Spain.

It is 4.15 km^{2} (1.60 sq mi) in size, with a population of 91.

== Villages and hamlets ==
- Carllés
- El Pebidal
- El Peñéu
- La Venta
- Preras
- Viescas
