= Idarga =

Parish in Spain

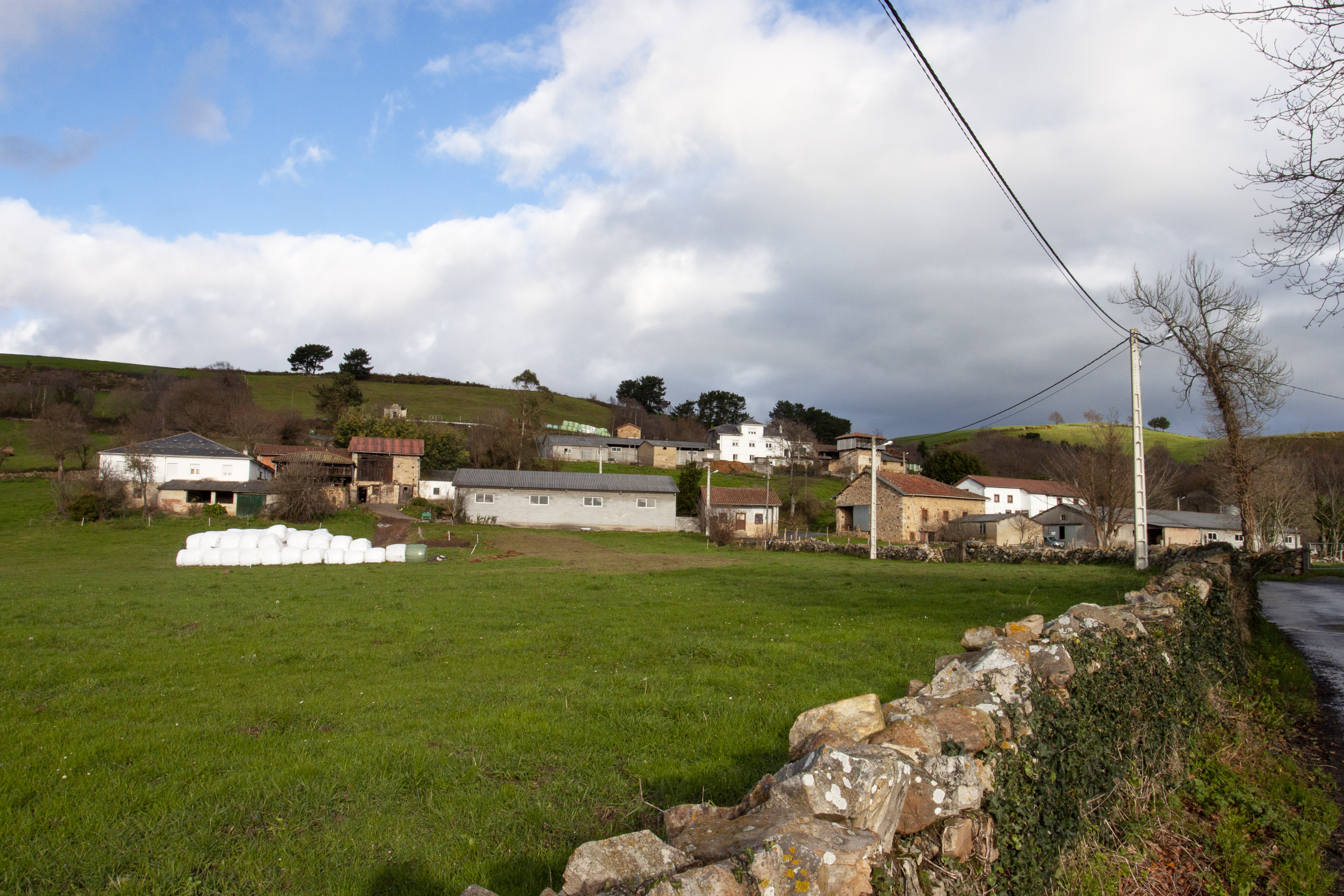
Idarga (Salas, Asturias)

Idarga is one of 28 parishes (administrative divisions) in Salas, a municipality within the province and autonomous community of Asturias, in northern Spain.

It is 11.32 km^{2} (4.37 sq mi) in size, with a population of 159.

== Villages ==
- Buspol (43.366667°N 6.283333°W)
- Cueva (43.366667°N 6.3°W)
- Idarga
- La Bounga (43.383333°N 6.3°W)
- La Corriquera (43.383333°N 6.3°W)
