= Llaniu =

Coordinates: 43.366667°N 6.15°W

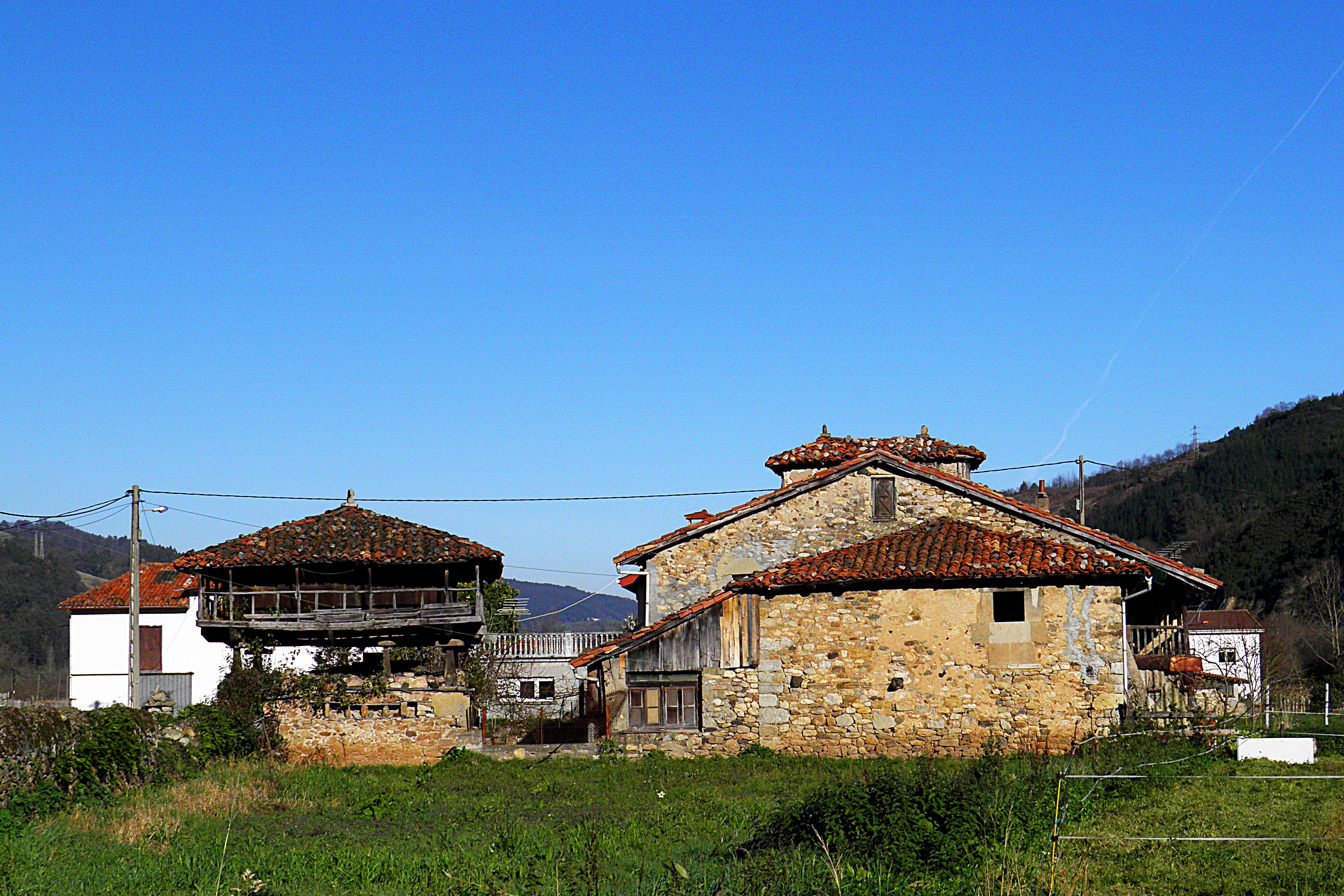
Llaniu

Llaniu (Laneo in Spanish) is one of 28 parishes (administrative divisions) in Salas, a municipality within the province and autonomous community of Asturias, in northern Spain.

It is 5.16 km^{2} (1.99 sq mi) in size, with a population of 125 (INE 2007). The altitude is 77 m (253 ft) above sea level.
