= Palacio de Doriga =

Coordinates: 43°23′42″N 6°08′33″W

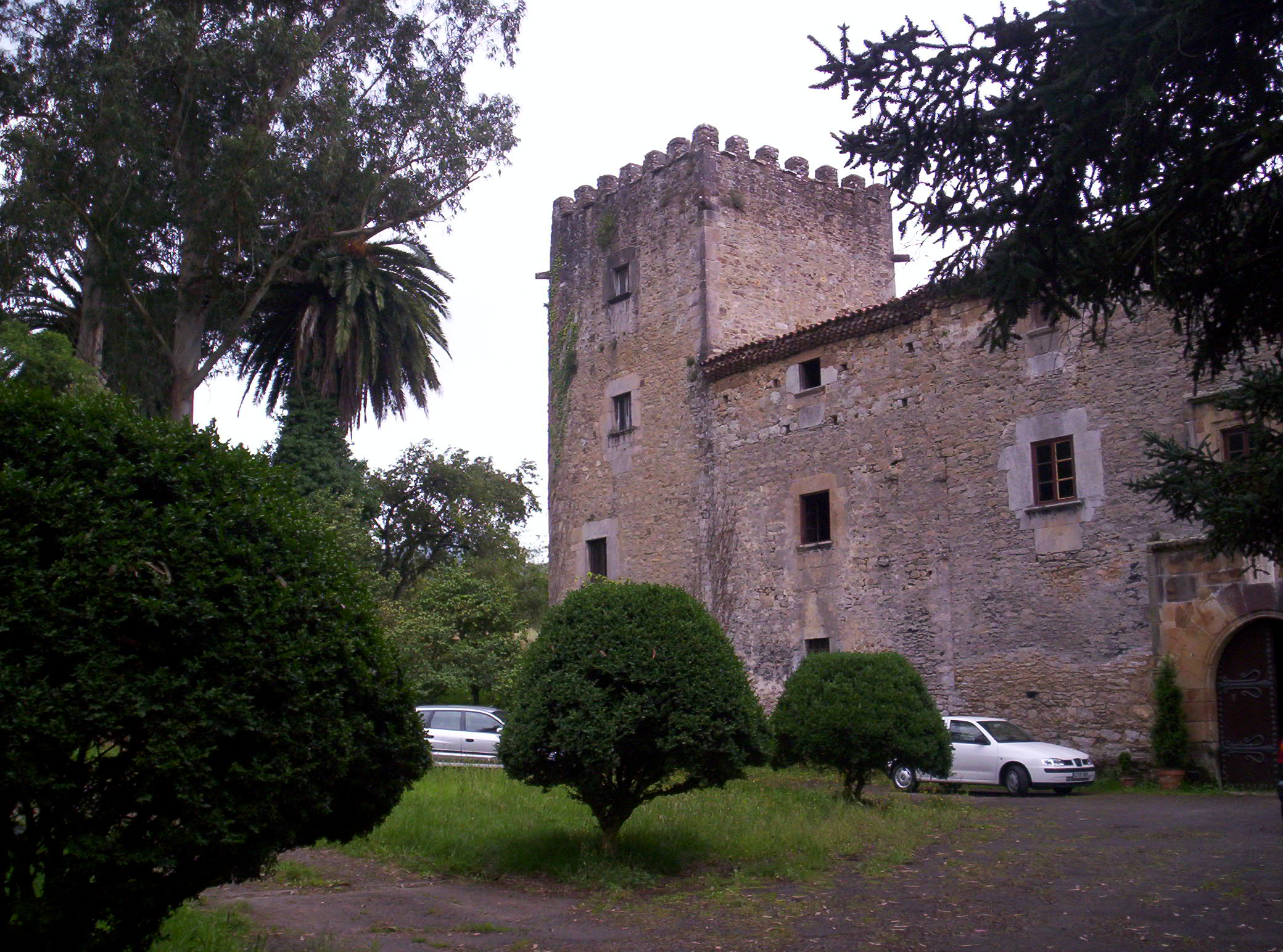
Doriga Palace and tower

Doriga Palace is located in Salas, Asturias, Spain. It is an example of a structure built for nobility, half containing a defensive character, and the other half being residential. The original nucleus is a medieval square tower, built in the 14th century, which forms part of the current palace. In the 15 century, a cubic structure was added to the tower. Its present aspect was completed during the early years of the 16th century, centered on the palace section.

== Architecture ==
In the year 1600, the columns of the lower floor of the patio were constructed, according to the inscription that is conserved in one of them, and the entrance door was opened to the patio. The palace is structured around this courtyard, of slightly rectangular plan, with 12 columns of stone with a smooth texture, which replaced the previous ones of wood. On the capitals, wooden blocks with carved scrolls support the entablature of the open corridor of the main floor. The sill is formed by turned wooden balusters with a row of canecillos under the skirting board. In the front of the main facade, there is a second open corridor of smaller height and with the same decorative characteristics.

The main façade is formed by three bodies: at one end, the tower with four section topped with battlements, and two bodies of three sections whose spans are distributed symmetrically. The entrance door is on the right, and it is formed by a semicircular arch with the shield, framed by a molding forming a chambranle. It emphasizes a small square window on the door, also framed by a hambranle, repeating the same decorative motif.

== Grounds ==
The building is surrounded by a park, enclosed by a crenellated wall with a cover and flanked by two semicircular bodies, with an arrowslit in the center of each.
