= San Xustu =

Coordinates: 43.433333°N 6.133333°W

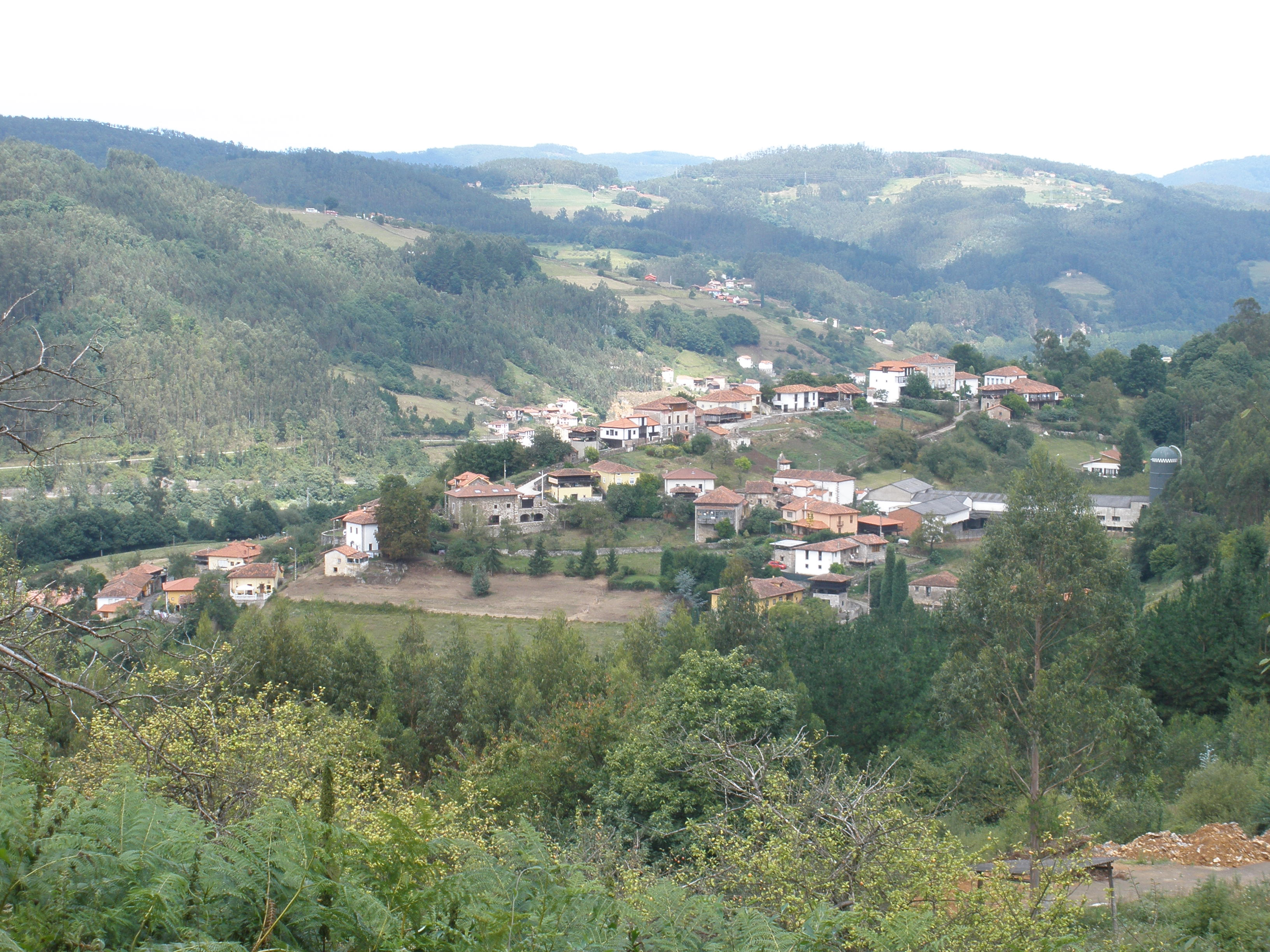
San Justo de la Dóriga

San Xustu (San Justo de la Dóriga in Spanish) is one of 28 parishes (administrative divisions) in Salas, a municipality within the province and autonomous community of Asturias, in northern Spain.

It is 2.53 km^{2} (0.98 sq mi) in size, with a population of 57.

== Villages ==
- Cotariellu
- San Xustu
