= Boudenaya =

Coordinates: 43.4°N 6.316667°W

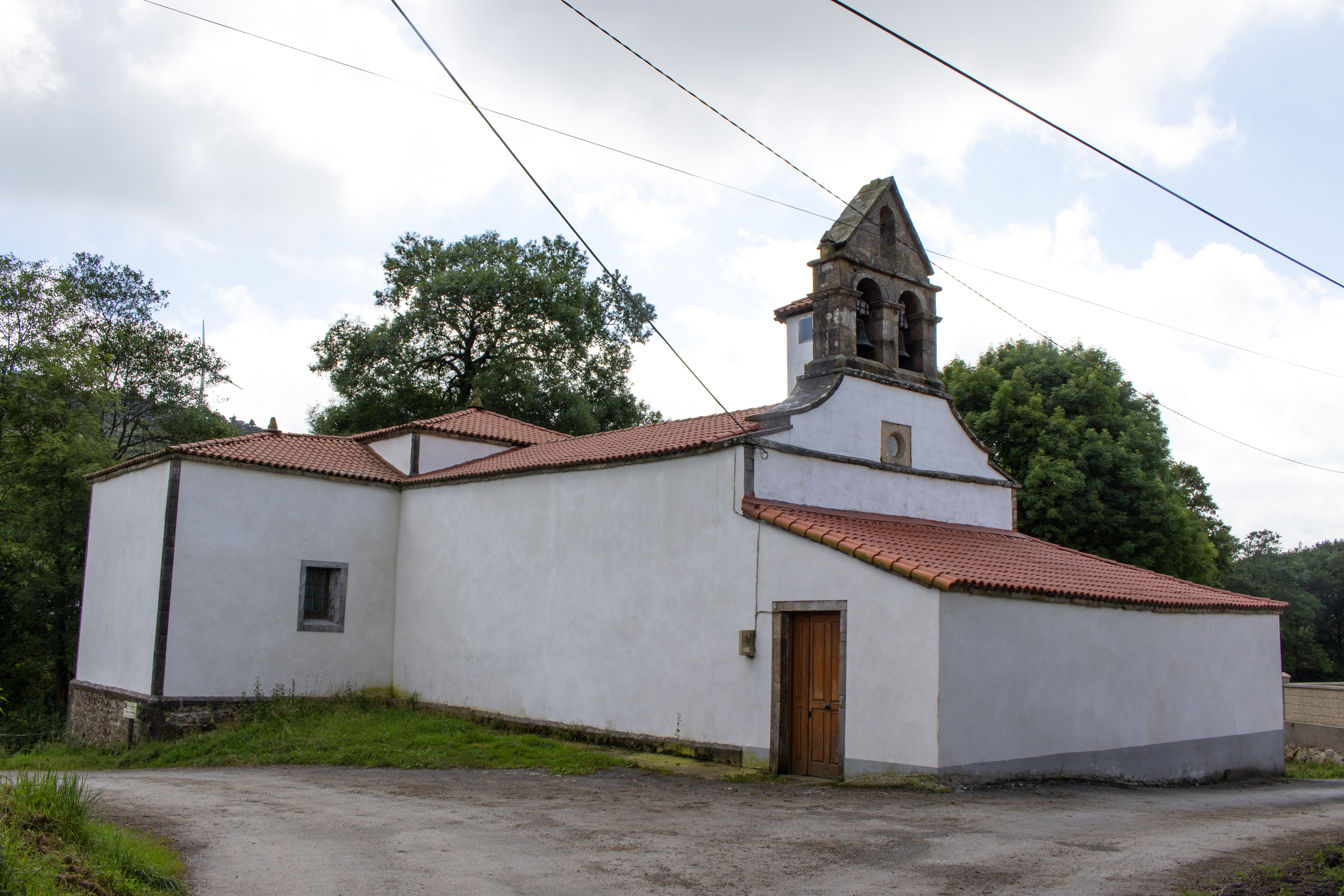
Boudenaya (Salas, Asturias)

Boudenaya is one of 28 parishes (administrative divisions) in Salas, a municipality within the province and autonomous community of Asturias, in northern Spain.

It is 7.69 km^{2} (2.97 sq mi) in size, with a population of 37.

== Villages ==
- Boudenaya
- Brañamiana
- El Castru
- El Couz
- La Cuerva
- Porciles
