= Castillo de Salas (castle) =

Castle in Salas, Asturias, Spain

Coordinates: 43°24′34″N 6°15′34″W

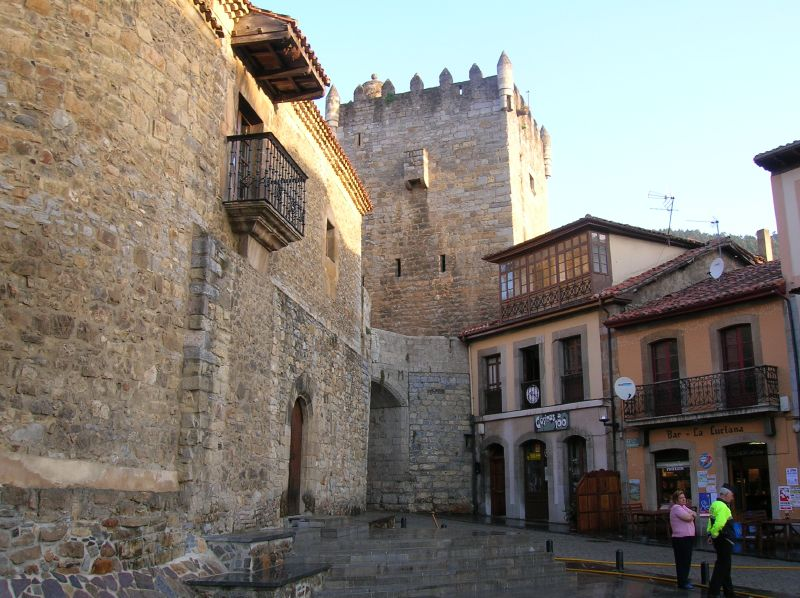
Castillo de Salas and Palacio Valdés, 2005.

The Castillo de Salas is a castle in the town of Salas in the region of Asturias, northern Spain. It first appeared in documentation in 1124.

== External facade ==
The castle is linked to the palace of Valdés Salas, which is currently a small hotel, through a bridge. The castle is a large square tower with four floors: The cellar, where the dungeons can be found, and three floors with a barrel vault. The floors are connected by a narrow spiral staircase and the roof is surrounded by battlements with a conical cylinder at each of the four corners. There are only three windows; the rest are arrow slits, purely for defensive purposes. Similarly, the machicolation on the second floor, over the main gate, which was accessible over moat.

== Internal structure ==
Inside the tower there is a museum on Pre-Romanesque art that is a valuable collection of pieces and tombstones from the church of San Martín, hence the name Museo Prerrománico de San Martín de Salas. The pieces provide an insight into the decorative richness of Pre-Romanesque art during the 10th century in Spain.

== See also ==
- List of castles in Spain
