= Santuyanu (Salas) =

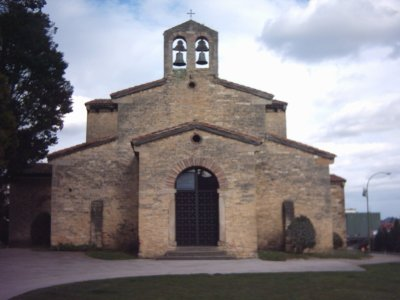
Romanesque church with bell-gable at Santullano

Santuyanu is one of 28 parishes (administrative divisions) in Salas, a municipality within the province and autonomous community of Asturias, in northern Spain.

It is 4.55 km^{2} (1.76 sq mi) in size, with a population of 38.

== Villages and hamlets ==
- El Monte
- El Pozu
- La Peral
- Morusu (43.433333°N 6.2°W)
- Prada
- Santuyanu
