= Ardesaldu =

Coordinates: 43.433333°N 6.283333°W

Ardesaldu is one of 28 parishes (administrative divisions) in Salas, a municipality within the province and autonomous community of Asturias, in northern Spain.

It is 9.3 km^{2} (3.6 sq mi) in size, with a population of 226.

== Villages ==
- Ardesaldu
- Vallouria
- La Borra
- L'Escobedal
- La Peña
- La Peñallonga
- Las Barracas
- Villarmor
