= Camuñu =

Coordinates: 43.416667°N 6.216667°W

Camuñu is one of 28 parishes (administrative divisions) in Salas, a municipality within the province and autonomous community of Asturias, in northern Spain.

It is 5.05 km^{2} (1.95 sq mi) in size, with a population of 130.

== Villages ==
- Bonavista
- La Carbayal
- Cardús
- Casamayor
- El Caleyu
- Fenigonte
- La Viesca
