= Ḷḷaviu =

Coordinates: 43.45°N 6.333333°W

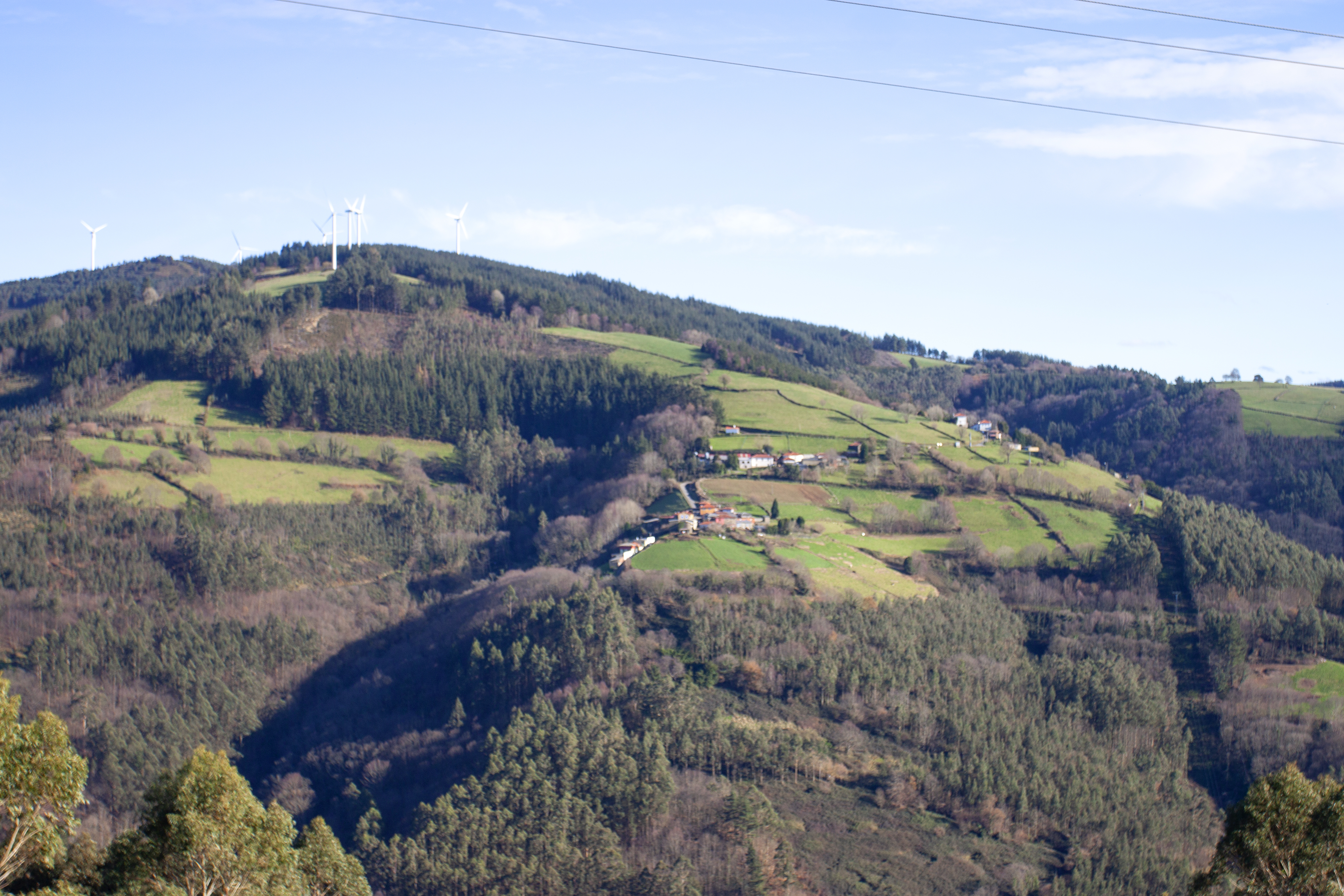
Lavio (Salas, Asturias)

Ḷḷaviu (Spanish Lavio) is one of 28 parishes (administrative divisions) in Salas, a municipality within the province and autonomous community of Asturias, in northern Spain.

It is 25.49 km^{2} (9.84 sq mi) in size, with a population of 216.

== Villages ==
- Brañasebil
- Buscabreiru
- Bustoutu
- L'Acebal
- El Cándanu
- Faéu
- Las Gaḷḷinas
- Ḷḷaviu
- Pende
- Socolina
- La Cornieḷḷa
