= Prieiru =

Coordinates: 43.433333°N 6.25°W

Prieiru is one of 28 parishes (administrative divisions) in Salas, a municipality within the province and autonomous community of Asturias, in northern Spain.

It is 6.07 km^{2} (2.34 sq mi) in size, with a population of 93.

== Villages ==
- Prieiru
- El Táranu
- Las Sentiniegas
- El Toural
- Daner
