= Cermoñu =

Coordinates: 43.383333°N 6.2°W

Cermoñu is one of 28 parishes (administrative divisions) in Salas, a municipality within the province and autonomous community of Asturias, in northern Spain.

It is 6.97 km^{2} (2.69 sq mi) in size, with a population of 199.

== Villages ==
- Vallouta
- Borreras
- Cermoñu
- Cortes
- La Planadera
- Nava
- Oubanes
- Valbona
