= Villazón (Salas) =

Villazón is one of 28 parishes (administrative divisions) in Salas, a municipality within the province and autonomous community of Asturias, in northern Spain.

It is 17.68 km^{2} (6.83 sq mi) in size, with a population of 464.

== Villages and hamlets ==
- Allence
- Arroxu (43.416667°N 6.183333°W)
- El Grigú
- Espinéu
- Figares (43.433333°N 6.183333°W)
- La Calzada
- Llamas
- Llourís (43.416667°N 6.2°W)
- Montagudu (43.4°N 6.2°W)
- Quintana
- Rabadiellu
- Villacarisme
- Villampeiru
- Villarraba (43.4°N 6.2°W)
