= La Llera =

- Parish
- Location within Spain
- Coordinates: 43.483333°N 5.333333°W
- Country: Spain
- Autonomous community: Asturias
- Province: Asturias
- Municipality: Colunga

La Llera is one of 13 parishes (administrative divisions) in the Colunga municipality, within the province and autonomous community of Asturias, in northern Spain.

The population is 8 according to the INE in 2007.
