= Miera (Salas) =

Coordinates: 43.333333°N 6.266667°W

Miera (Spanish Millara) is one of 28 parishes (administrative divisions) in Salas, a municipality within the province and autonomous community of Asturias, in northern Spain.

It is 1.81 km^{2} (0.70 sq mi) in size, with a population of 24. The altitude is 500 m (1,600 ft) above sea level.
