= La Espina =

Parish in Salas, Asturias

Coordinates: 43.383333°N 6.333333°W

La Espina is one of 28 parishes (administrative divisions) in Salas, a municipality within the province and autonomous community of Asturias, in northern Spain.

It is 7.89 km^{2} (3.05 sq mi) in size, with a population of 558.

== Villages ==
- Ablanéu
- Cotariellu
- El Pousadoriu
- La Espina
- Ouvés
