= Miera, New Mexico =

Miera
- Unincorporated community
- Location within New Mexico
- Coordinates: 36°5′28″N 103°33′8″W
- Country: United States
- State: New Mexico
- County: Union
- Elevation: 4,902 ft (1,494 m)
- Time zone: UTC-7 (Mountain (MST))
  - Summer (DST): UTC-6 (MDT)
- Area code: 575
- GNIS feature ID: 898573

Miera is a ghost town in Union County, New Mexico, United States. The settlement was established in 1875 and a post office operated there from 1887 to 1927. In the 1900 United States census, it had a population of 450. It was located nearby Tramperos Creek.
