= Doriga =

Coordinates: 43.4°N 6.15°W

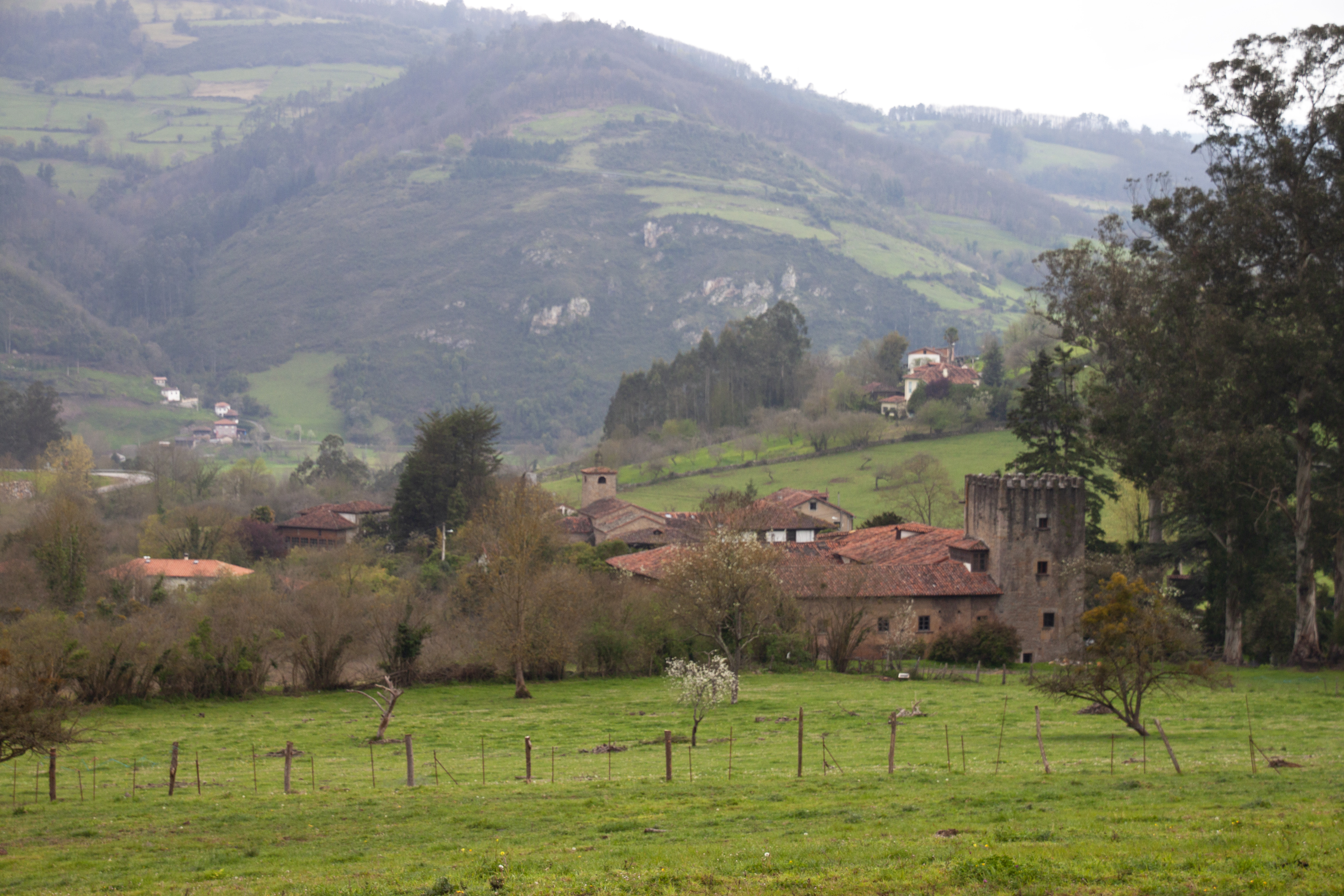
Santa Eulalia de las Dorigas (Salas, Asturias)

Santolaya de las Dorigas (officially Doriga, and Santa Eulalia de las Dorigas in Spanish) is one of 28 parishes (administrative divisions) in Salas, a municipality within the province and autonomous community of Asturias, in northern Spain.

It is 7.28 km^{2} (2.81 sq mi) in size, with a population of 234.

== Villages ==
- Bárzana
- Doriga
- Fuexu
- La Ponte
- Llaureda
- Marcel
- Moratín
- Rubial
- Samarciellu
