= Salas, Asturias =

Salas
- Municipality
- Coat of arms

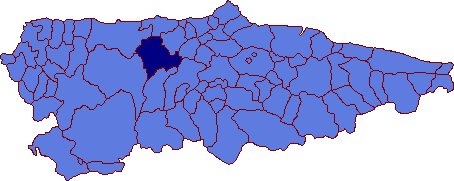

- Location in Spain
- Coordinates: 43°24′N 6°15′W
- Country: Spain
- Autonomous community: Asturias
- Province: Asturias
- Comarca: Oviedo
- Capital: Salas

Government
  - Alcalde: Sergio Hidalgo Alfonso (FAC)

Area
  - Total: 227.11 km^{2} (87.69 sq mi)
- Highest elevation: 923 m (3,028 ft)

Population (2025-01-01)
  - Total: 4,771
  - Density: 21.01/km^{2} (54.41/sq mi)
- Demonym: salense
- Time zone: UTC+1 (CET)
  - Summer (DST): UTC+2 (CEST)
- Postal code: 33860
- Website: www.ayto-salas.es

Salas (also known as San Martin de Salas) is a town and concejo (municipality) in the Principality of Asturias. It lies on the road from San Sebastián to Santiago de Compostela, and on a small subtributary of the river Narcea. It is bordered on the north by Valdés, Cudillero and Pravia, to south by Belmonte de Miranda, to the east by Pravia, Candamo and Grado, and to the west by Tineo and Valdés.

Salas is a mountainous region in which coal-mining and agriculture are the principal industries. The products of this region are sent for export to Cudillero, a small harbour on the Bay of Biscay. Salas is well known as a tourist point and as the birthplace of Fernando de Valdés y Salas.

== Culture ==
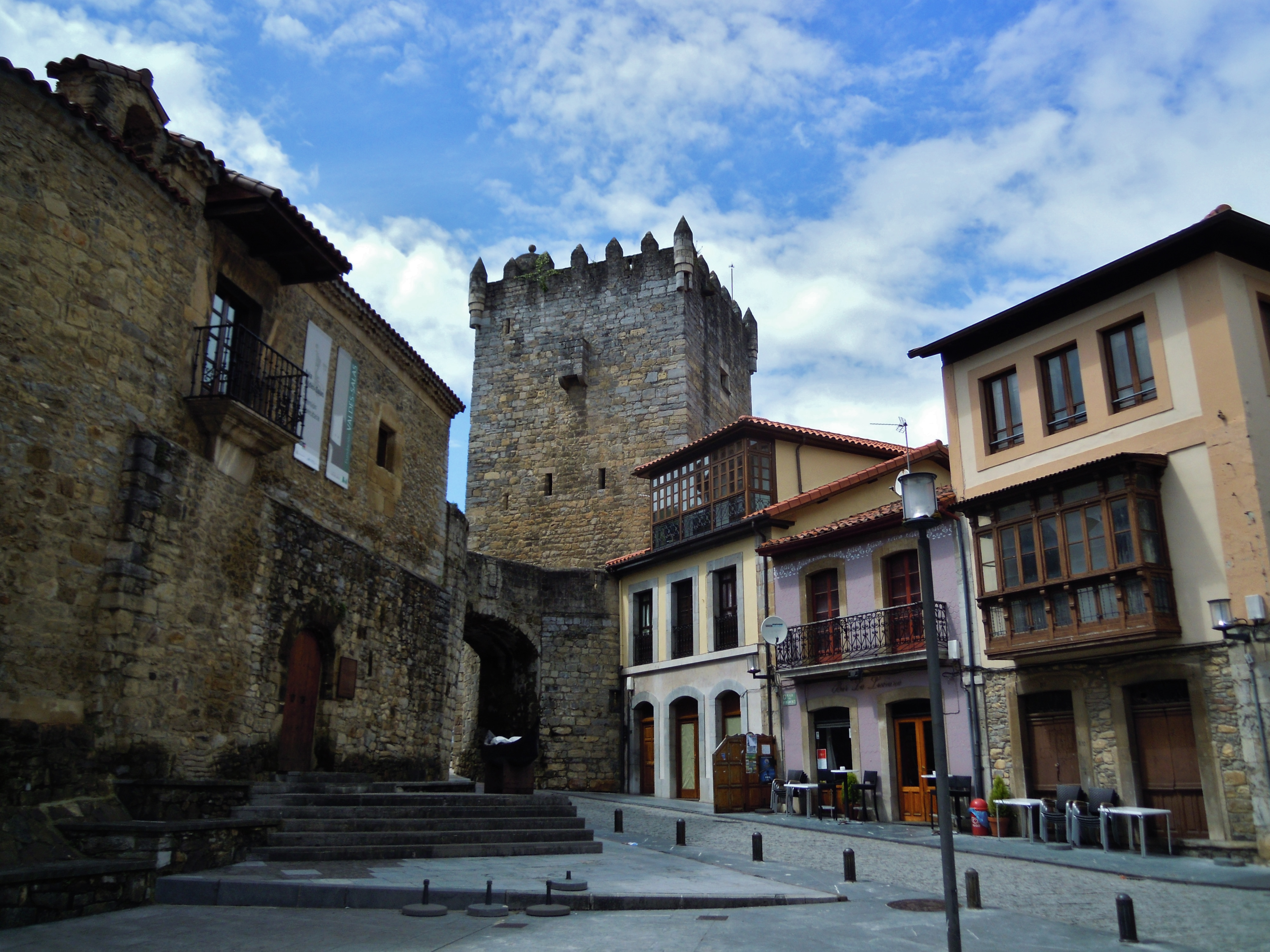
Valdéz-Salas Palace

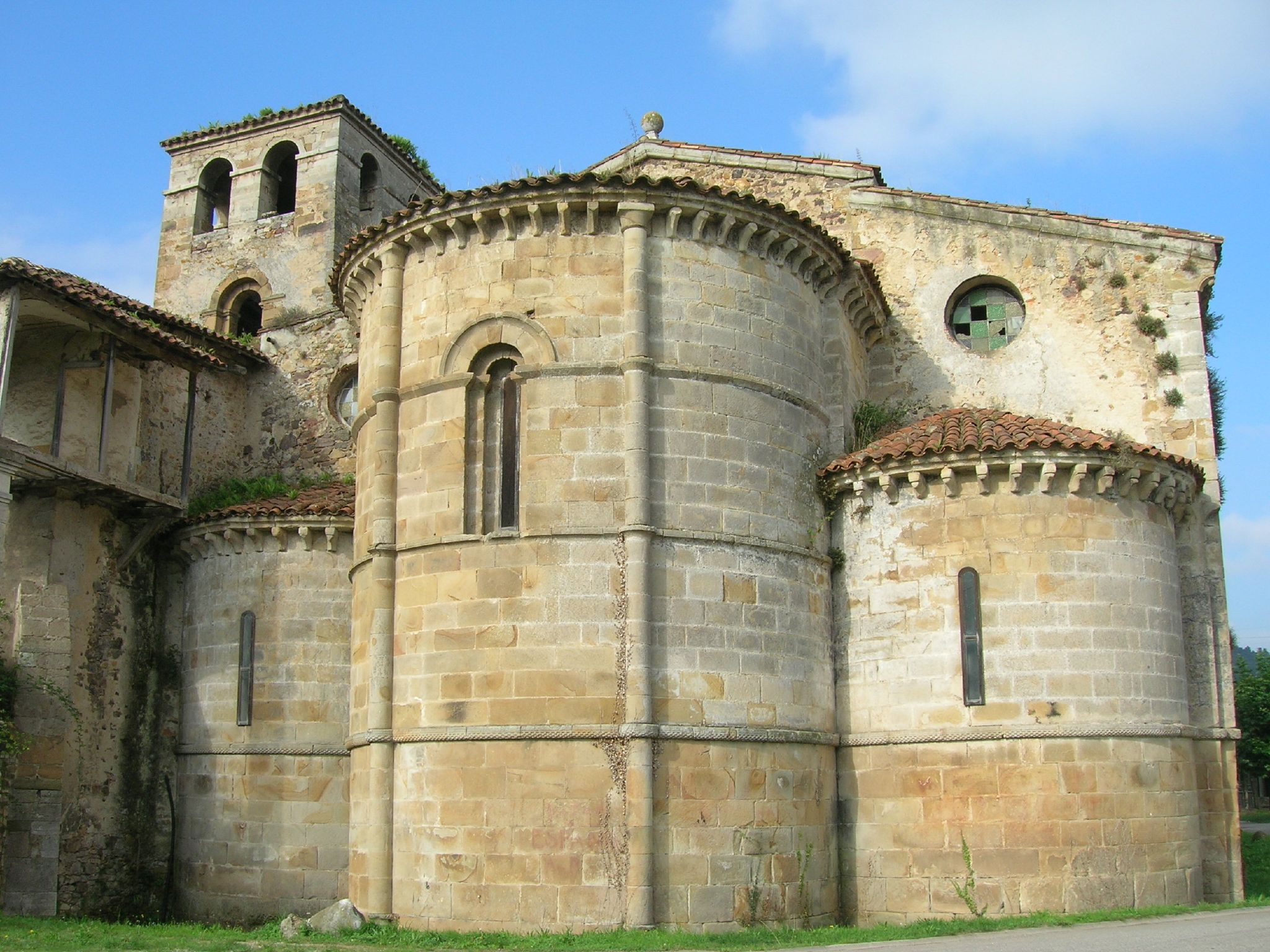
Cornellana monastery

There are several buildings of importance in Salas, the Palacio de Doriga, Palacio de Valdés and Castillo de Salas, among others. Also the romanesque Monasterio de San Salvador, the Monasterio de San Martin and the Colegiata de Santa María la Mayor.

== Parishes ==
- Alava
- Ardesaldu
- Boudenaya
- Camuñu
- Cermoñu
- Cornellana
- Godán
- Idarga
- La Espina
- Llaniu
- Ḷḷaviu
- Llinares
- Maecina
- Maeza
- Miera
- Prieiru
- Salas
- Santolín
- San Esteban de la Dóriga
- San Xustu
- Aciana
- Doriga
- Santiagu la Barca
- Santuyanu
- Soutu los Infantes
- Viescas
- Villamar
- Villazón

== Politics ==
Elecciones municipales
Partido	1979	1983	1987	1991	1995	1999	2003	2007	2011
PSOE	0	6	6	9	8	10	8	7	6
FAC									5
PP	4	7	5	4	5	2	5	5	2
IU	0	0	0	0	0	0	0	1	0
UCA	5								
UCD/CDS	4	-	2	0					
CIS						1			
Total	13	13	13	13	13	13	13	13	13

== See also ==
- List of municipalities in Asturias
