= Castile and León =

Autonomous community in northern Spain

Castile and León Castilla y León (Spanish) Castiella y Llión (Leonese) Castela e León (Galician)
- Autonomous community
- Flag Coat of arms

- Location of Castile and León in Spain
- Interactive map of Castile and León
- Coordinates: 41°38′42″N 04°44′33″W
- Country: Spain
- Capital: Valladolid (de facto)
- Provinces: Ávila, Burgos, León, Palencia, Salamanca, Segovia, Soria, Valladolid and Zamora

Government
  - President: Alfonso Fernández Mañueco (PP)
  - Legislature: Cortes of Castile and León
  - Executive: Junta of Castile and León

Area
  - Total: 94,216.91 km^{2} (36,377.35 sq mi)
  - Rank: 1st in Spain

Population (2025)
  - Total: 2,401,221
  - Rank: 6th in Spain
  - Density: 25.48609/km^{2} (66.00868/sq mi)
- Demonyms: castellanoleonés; castellano y leonés

GDP
  - Total: €73.993 billion (2024)
  - Per capita: €30,818 (2024)
- ISO 3166 code: ES-CL
- Official languages: Spanish
- Statute of Autonomy: 2 March 1983
- Congress seats: 31 (of 350)
- Senate seats: 39 (of 265)
- HDI (2025): 0.912 very high · 9th
- Website: jcyl.es

Castile and León (Note: Spanish: Castilla y León [kasˈtiʎaj leˈon]; Leonese: Castiella y Llión [kasˈtjeʎa i ʎiˈoŋ]; Galician: Castela e León [kasˈtɛlɐ ɪ leˈoŋ]) is an autonomous community of Spain. While a capital has not been explicitly declared, the seats of the executive and legislative powers are set in Valladolid by law, and for all purposes that city (also the most populated municipality) serves as the de facto regional capital.

Castile and León is a landlocked region in the northwest of the Iberian Peninsula, bordered by Portugal as well as by the Spanish autonomous communities of Galicia, Asturias, Cantabria, the Basque Country, La Rioja, Aragon, Castilla–La Mancha, the Community of Madrid and Extremadura. Chiefly comprising the northern half of the Inner Plateau, it is surrounded by mountain barriers (the Cantabrian Mountains to the North, the Sistema Central to the South and the Sistema Ibérico to the East) and most of the territory is drained by the Douro River (Spanish: Duero), flowing west toward the Atlantic Ocean. Castile and León is the largest autonomous community in Spain by area, covering 94,216.91 square kilometres (36,377.35 sq mi), however, it is very sparsely populated, as with a population of 2,401,221 as of 2025, it has the 2nd-lowest population density in the country with only 25.5 inhabitants per square kilometer.

The autonomous community was created in 1983 by grouping the provinces of León, Zamora, Salamanca (all three traditionally attached to the region of León), Ávila, Burgos, Palencia, Segovia, Soria and Valladolid (attached to Old Castile).

The region contains eleven World Heritage Sites, making it (along with Lombardia in Italy) the region with most UNESCO World Heritage Sites. UNESCO recognizes the Cortes of León of 1188 as the cradle of worldwide parliamentarism. The region is strongly affected by population ageing. Castile and León is the region with the worst quality of government index in Spain.

== History ==
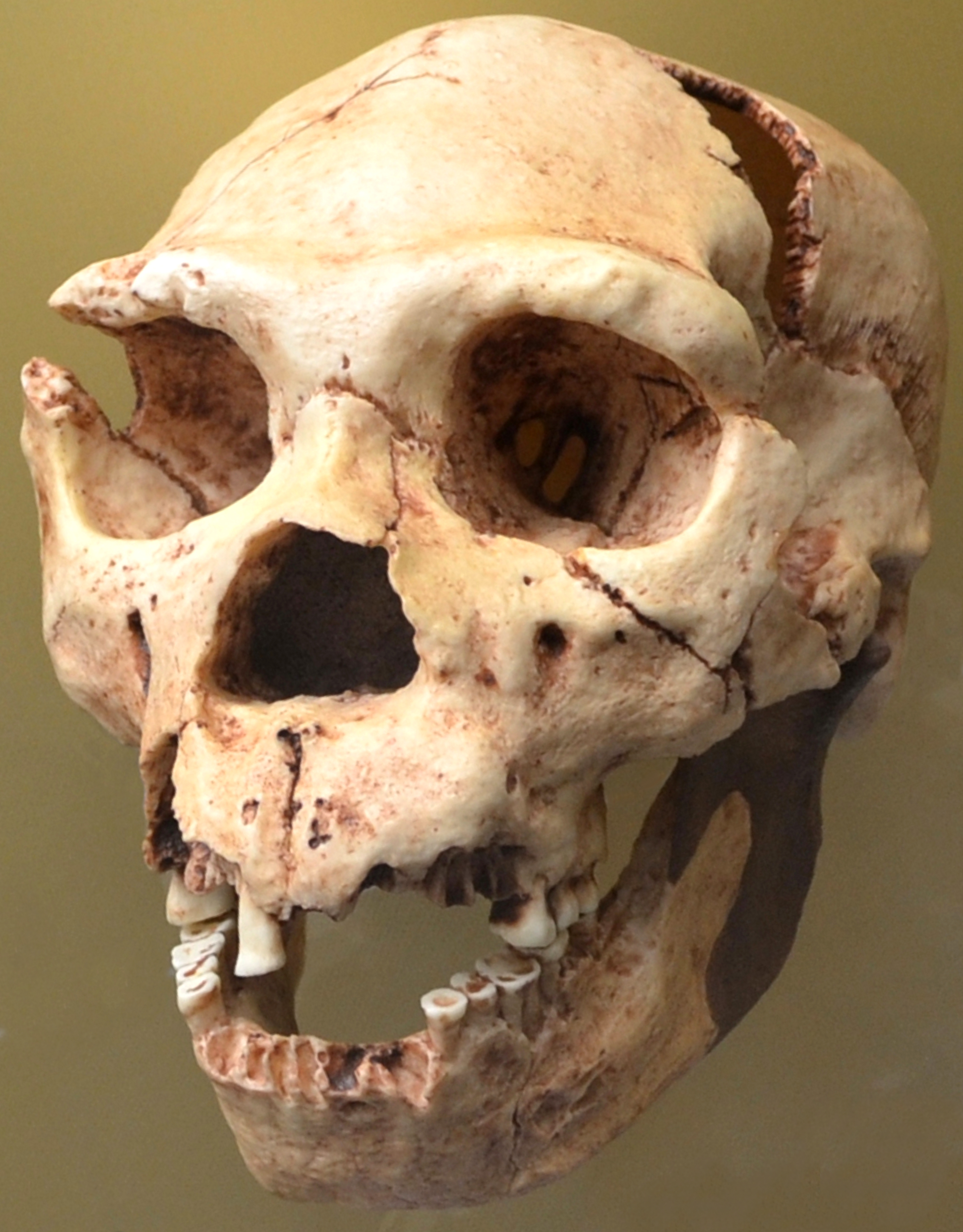
Skull number 5 of Homo heidelbergensis. It appeared in the 1992 campaign, extracted from the Atapuerca Mountains.

Several archaeological findings show that in prehistoric times these lands were already inhabited. In the Atapuerca Mountains have been found many bones of the ancestors of Homo sapiens, making these findings one of the most important to determine the history of human evolution. The most important discovery that catapulted the site to international fame was the remains of Homo heidelbergensis.

Before the arrival of the Romans, it is known that the territories that make up Castile and León today were occupied by various Celtic peoples, such as Vaccaei, Autrigones, Turmodigi, the Vettones, Astures or Celtiberians. The Roman conquest resulted in warring with the local tribes. One particularly famous episode was the siege of Numantia, an old town located near the current city of Soria.

The romanization was unstoppable, and to this day great Roman works have remained, mainly the Aqueduct of Segovia as well as many archaeological remains such as those of the ancient Clunia, Salt mines of Poza de la Sal and the vía de la Plata pathway, which crosses the west of the community from Astorga (Asturica Augusta) to the capital of modern Extremadura, Mérida (Emerita Augusta).

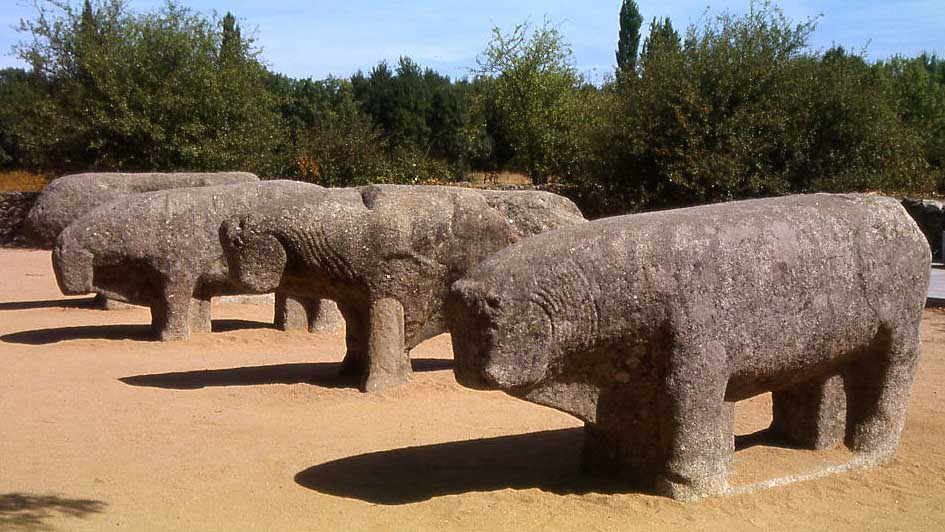
Bulls of Guisando, in El Tiemblo, Ávila. These verracos, of Celtic origin, are found in many towns of the western half of Castile and León.

With the fall of Rome, the lands were occupied militarily by the Visigoth peoples of Germanic origin. The subsequent arrival of the Arabs was followed by a process known as the Reconquista (Reconquest). In the mountainous area of Asturias, a small Christian kingdom was created that opposed the Islamic presence in the Peninsula. It proclaimed itself an heir of the last Visigoth kings, who in turn had been deeply romanized. This resistance of Visigoth-Roman heritage, supported by Christianity, was becoming increasingly strong and expanding to the south, eventually establishing its court in the city of León, becoming the Kingdom of León. To encourage the repopulation of the newly reconquered lands, a number of fueros ("letters of repopulation") were granted by the monarchs.

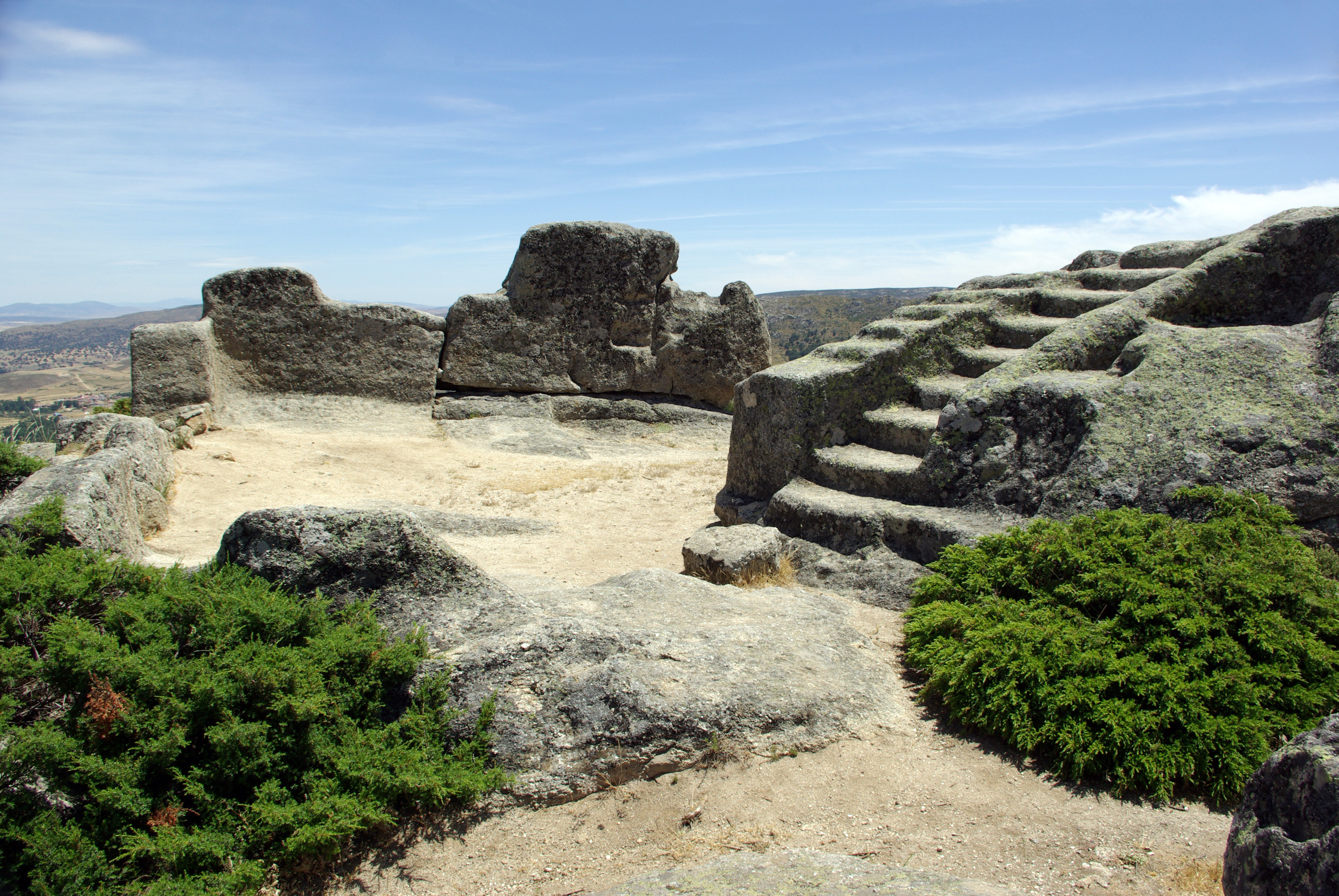
Celtiberian castro of Ulaca.

In the Middle Ages, Christian pilgrimages to Santiago de Compostela were popularized. The Camino de Santiago, running along the northern part of the region, was a major part of the route of pilgrimage, so it contributed to the spread of European cultural innovations throughout the peninsula. Today the Camino is still an important tourist and cultural attraction.

In 1188, the basilica of San Isidoro of León was the setting of the first parliamentary body in the history of Europe, with the participation of the Third Estate. The king who summoned it was Alfonso IX of León.

The legal basis for the kingdom was the Roman law, and because of this the kings increasingly wanted more power, like the Roman emperors. This is very clearly seen in the Siete Partidas of Alfonso X of Castile, which shows the imperial monism that the king sought. The King did not want to be a primus inter pares, but the source of the law.

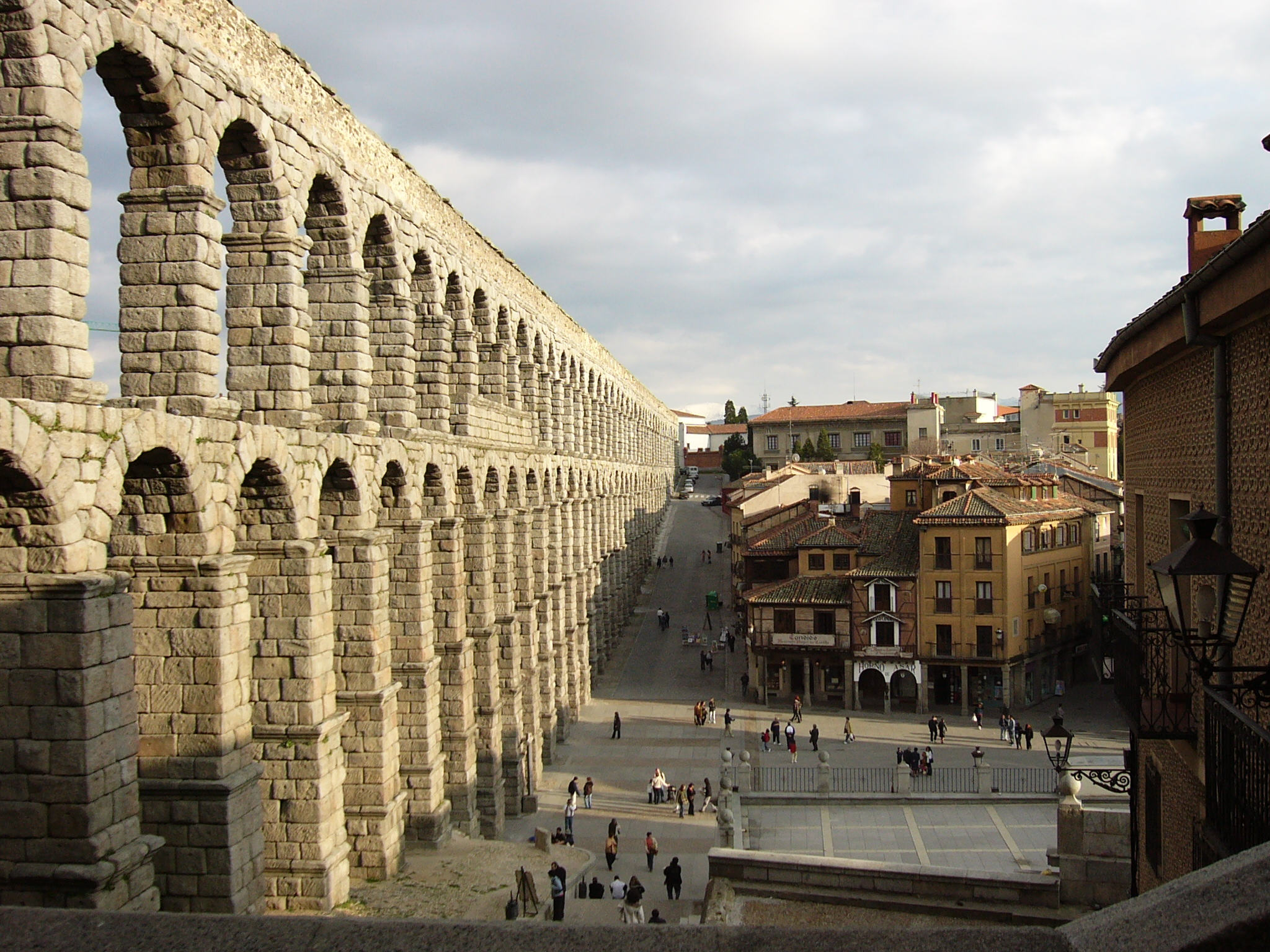
Aqueduct of Segovia, Roman construction.

Simultaneously, a county of this Christian kingdom of León, began to acquire autonomy and to expand. This is the primitive County of Castile, which would grow into a powerful kingdom among the Christian kingdoms of the Peninsula. The first Castilian count was Fernán González.

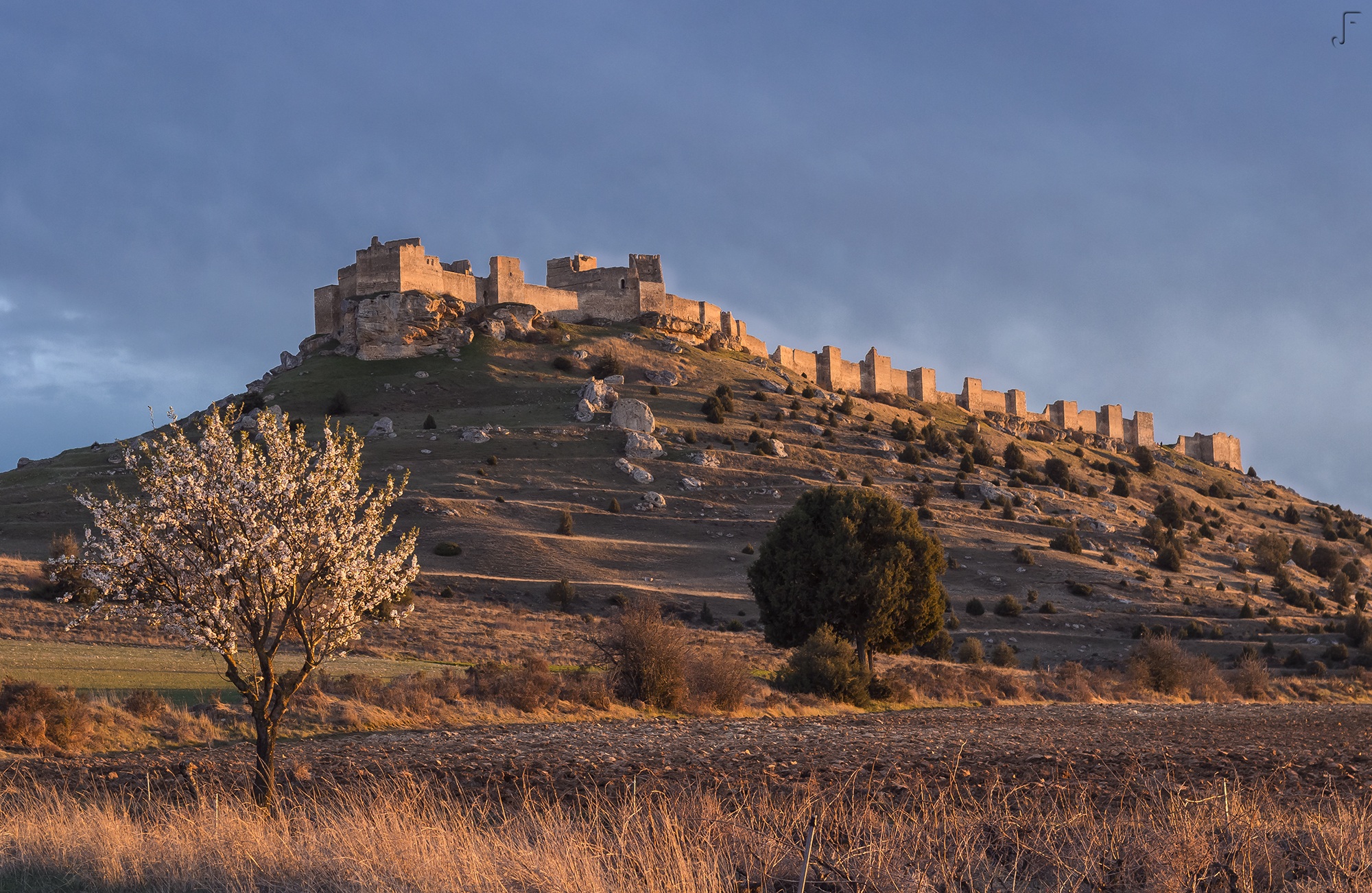
Castle of Gormaz. It was the largest fortress in Europe after its expansion in 956, in the river Duero (Douro) defense line.

León and Castile continued to expand to the South, even beyond the Douro river, seeking to conquer lands under Islamic rule. That was the time of the Cantares de gesta, poems which recount the great deeds of the Christian nobles who fought against the Muslim enemy. Despite this, Christian and Muslim kings maintained diplomatic relations. One clear example is Rodrigo Díaz de Vivar, El Cid, paradigm of the medieval Christian knight, who fought both for Christian and Muslim kings.

The origin of the definitive dynastic unification of the kingdoms of Castile and León, which had been separated for just seven decades, was in 1194. Alfonso VIII of Castile and Alfonso IX of León signed in Tordehumos the treaty that pacified the area of Tierra de Campos and laid the foundation for a future reunification of the kingdoms, consolidated in 1230 with Ferdinand III the Saint. This agreement is called the Treaty of Tordehumos.

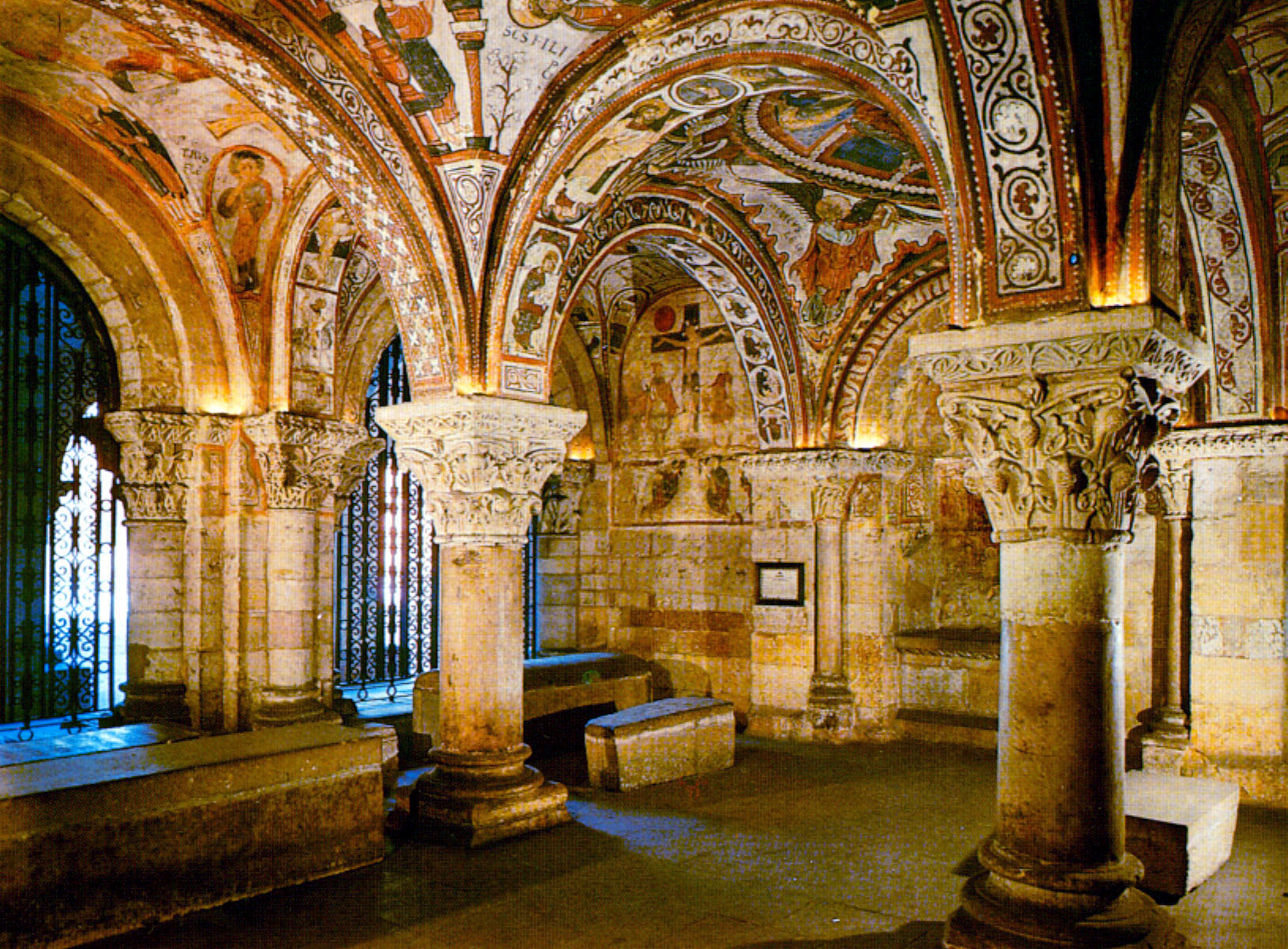
Pantheon of kings of the Romanesque Basilica of San Isidoro of León where Alfonso IX convened the Cortes of León of 1188, the first parliamentary body of the history of Europe, with presence of Third Estate. In the same basilica is the Chalice of Doña Urraca, which some researchers assimilate with the Holy Grail.

During the Late Middle Ages there was an economic and political crisis produced by a series of bad harvests and by disputes between nobles and the Crown for power, as well as between different contenders for the throne. In the Cortes of Valladolid of 1295, Ferdinand IV is recognized as king. The painting María de Molina presents her son Fernando IV in the Cortes of Valladolid of 1295 presides today the Spanish Congress of Deputies along with a painting of the Cortes of Cádiz, emphasizing the parliamentarian importance that has all the development of Cortes in Castile and León, despite its subsequent decline. The Crown was becoming more authoritarian and the nobility more dependent on it.

The Reconquista continued advancing from the thriving Crown of Castile to the south, and culminated with the Granada War against the last Muslim stronghold in the Iberian peninsula, the Nasrid Kingdom of Granada, which surrendered on 2 January 1492.

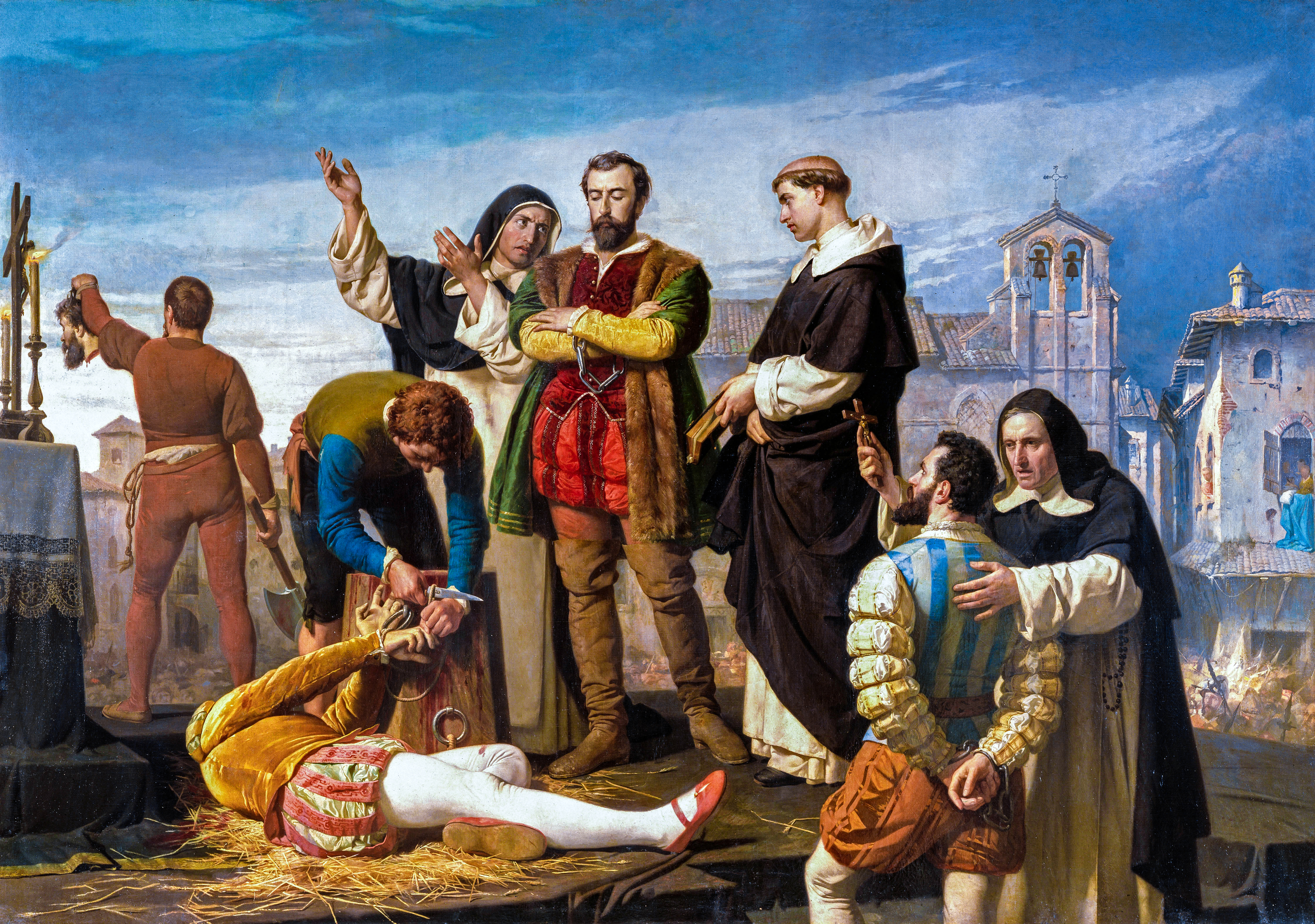
Revolt of the Comuneros

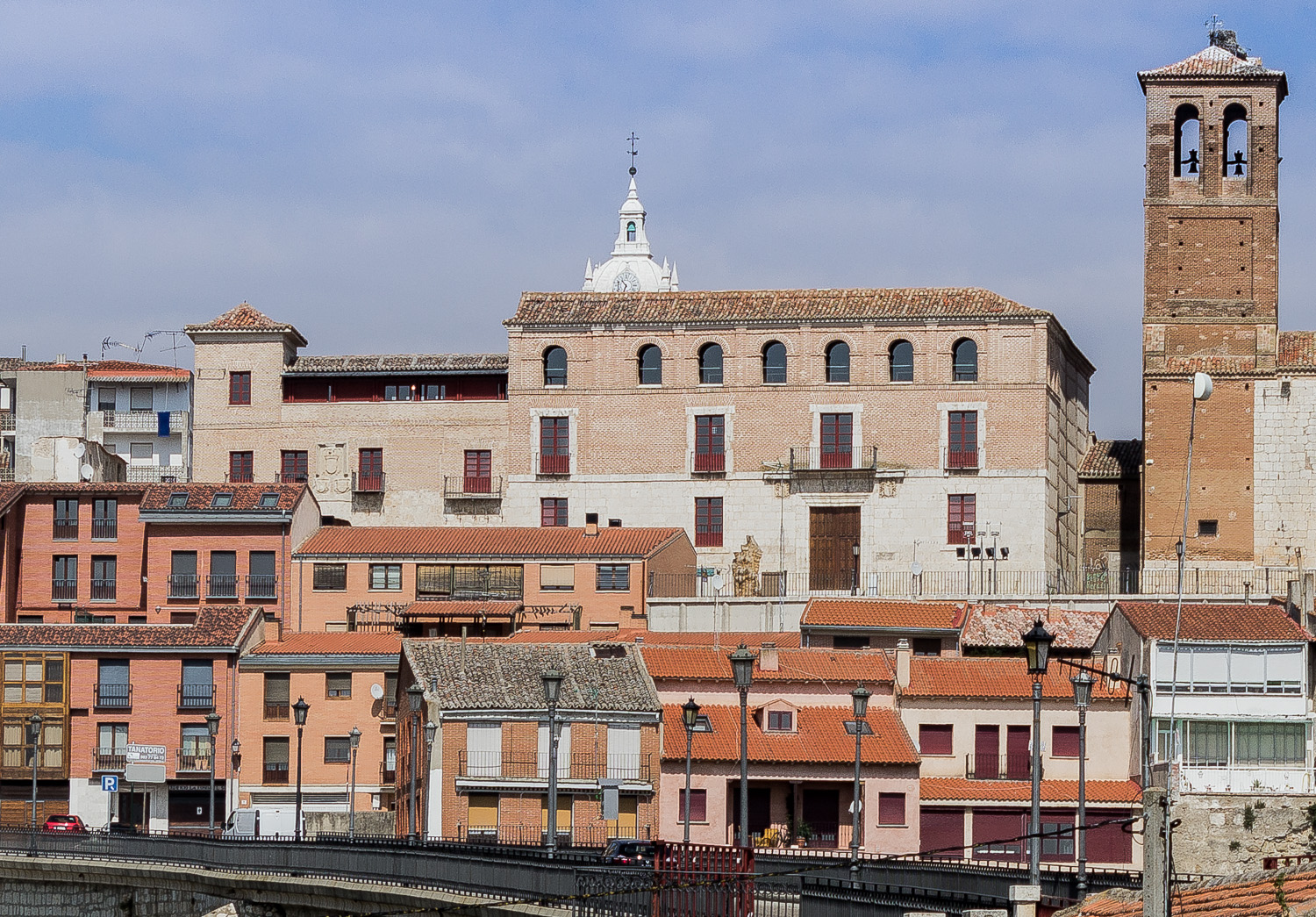
In Tordesillas queen Isabella I of Castile signed the Treaty of Tordesillas. Her daughter queen Joanna of Castile was imprisoned in a convent of the city by her father first, by her son later, and was praised by the comuneros in their Revolt.

=== Antecedents of the autonomy ===
In June 1978, Castile and León obtained the pre-autonomy, through the creation of General council of Castile and León by Royal Decree-Law 20/1978, of 13 June.

In times of the First Spanish Republic (1873–1874), the federal republicans conceived the project to create a federated state of eleven provinces in the valley of the Spanish Douro, that would also have included the provinces of Santander and Logroño. Very few years before, in 1869, as part of a manifesto, federal republicans representatives of the 17 provinces of Albacete, Ávila, Burgos, Ciudad Real, Cuenca, Guadalajara, León, Logroño, Madrid, Palencia, Salamanca, Santander, Segovia, Soria, Toledo, Valladolid and Zamora proposed in the so-called Castilian Federal Pact the conformation of an entity formed by two different "states": the state of Old Castile -that is presently built for the current Castilian-Leonese provinces and the provinces of Logroño and Santander-, and the state of New Castile -which conforms to the current provinces of Castilla–La Mancha plus the province of Madrid-. The end of the Republic, at the beginning of 1874, thwarted the initiative.

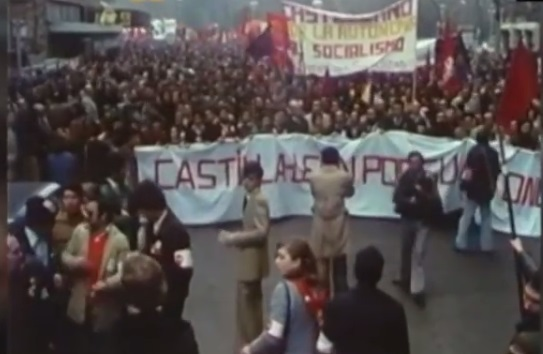
Protest of 1978 in Valladolid that demanded a Statute of Autonomy for the region.

In 1921, on the occasion of the fourth centenary of the Battle of Villalar, the Santander City Council advocated the creation of a Castilian and Leonese Commonwealth of eleven provinces, an idea that would be maintained in later years. At the end of 1931 and beginning of 1932, from León, Eugenio Merino elaborated a text in which the base of a Castilian-Leonese regionalism was put. The text was published in the Diario de León newspaper.

During the Second Spanish Republic, especially in 1936, there was a great regionalist activity favorable to a region of eleven provinces, and even bases for the Statute of Autonomy were elaborated. The Diario de León advocated for the formalization of this initiative and the constitution of an autonomous region with these words:

Join in a personality León and Old Castile around the great basin of the Douro, without to fall now into provincial rivalries.

— Diario de León, 22 May 1936.

The end of the Spanish Civil War and the beginning of Franco regime ended the aspirations of the autonomy for the region. The philosopher José Ortega y Gasset collected this scheme in his publications.

After the death of Francisco Franco, regionalist, autonomist and nationalist organizations (Castilian-Leonese regionalism and Castilian nationalism) as Regional Alliance of Castile and León (1975), Regional Institute of Castile and León (1976) or the Autonomous Nationalist Party of Castile and León (1977). Later after the extinction of these formations arose in 1993 Regionalist Unity of Castile and León.

At the same time, others of Leonesist character arose, such as the Leonese Autonomous Group (1978) or Regionalist Party of the Leonese Country (1980), which advocated the creation of a Leonese autonomous community, composed of provinces of León, Salamanca and Zamora. The popular and political support that maintained the uniprovincial autonomy in León became very important in that city.

=== Autonomy ===
The autonomous community of Castile and León is the result of the union in 1983 of nine provinces: the three that, after the territorial division of 1833, by which the provinces were created, were ascribed to the Region of León, and six ascribed to Old Castile; however 2 provinces of Old Castile were not included: Santander (current community of Cantabria) and Logroño (current La Rioja).

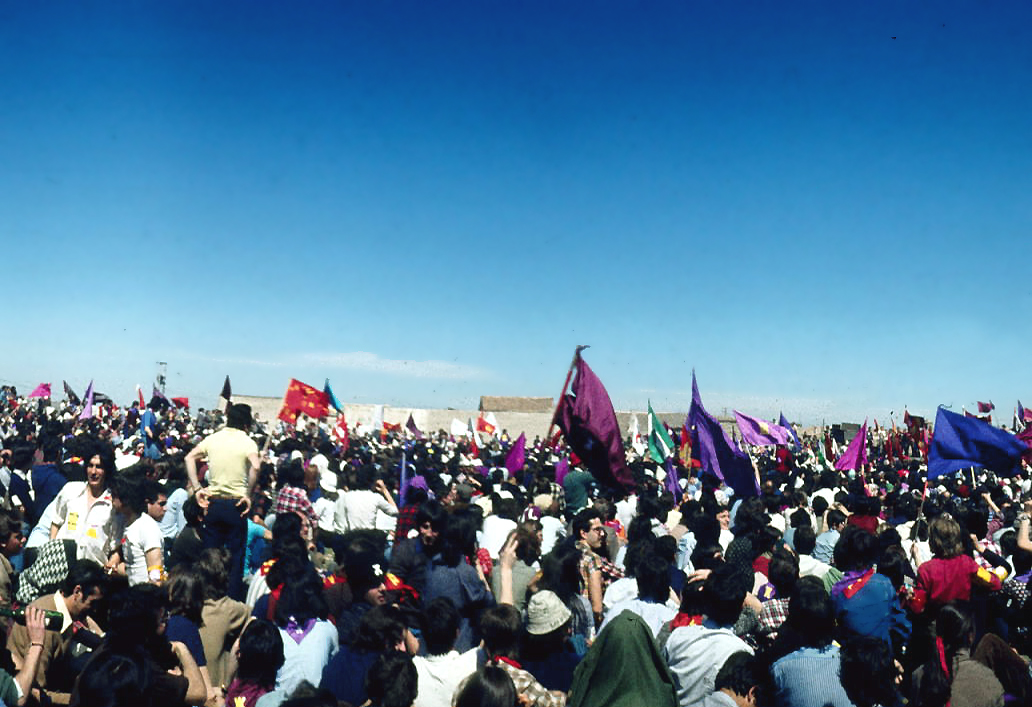
Villalar de los Comuneros, 23 April 1977

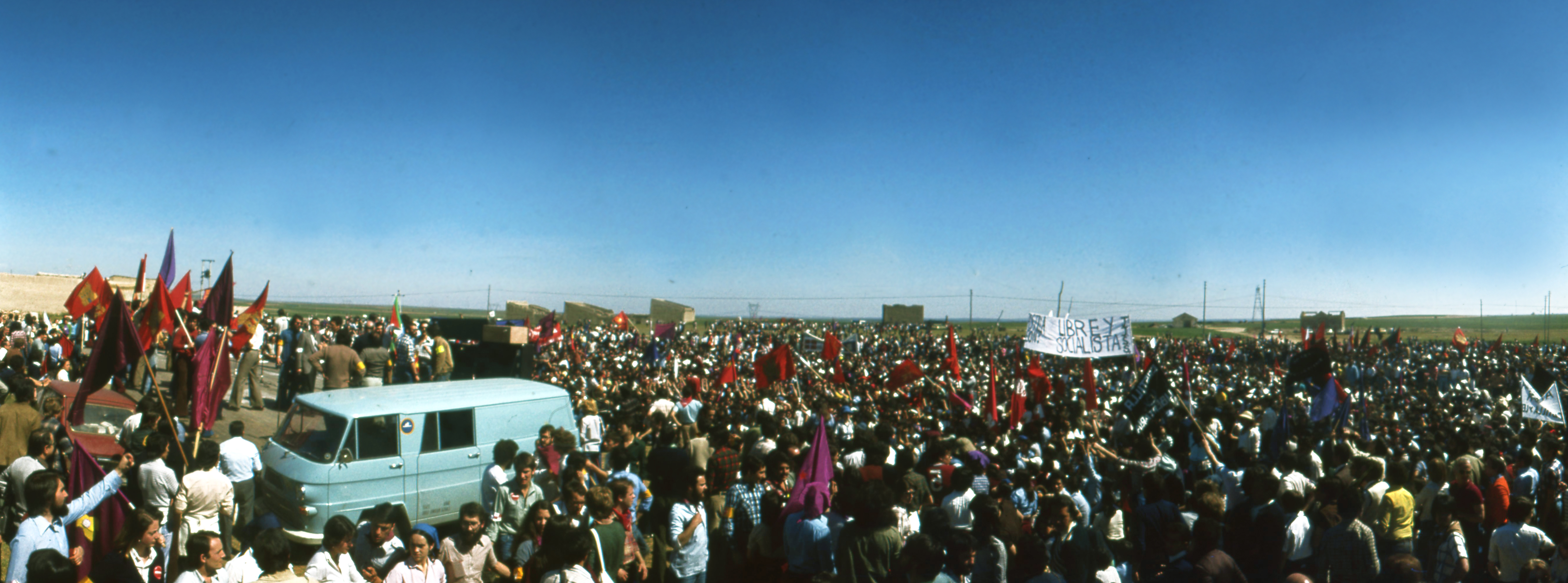
Villalar de los Comuneros, 23 April 1977

In the case of Cantabria the creation of an autonomous community was advocated for historical, cultural and geographical reasons, while in La Rioja the process was more complex due to the existence of three alternatives, all based on historical and socio-economic reasons: union with Castile and León (advocated by the Union of the Democratic Centre political party), union to a Basque-Navarrese community (supported by the Socialist Party and Communist Party) or creation of an uniprovincial autonomy; the latter option was chosen because it had more support among the population.

After the creation of the Castilian-Leonese pre-autonomous body, which was supported by the Provincial Council of León in its agreement of April 16, 1980, this institution revoked its original agreement on January 13, 1983, just as the draft of the Organic Law entered the Spanish parliament. The Constitutional Court determined which of those contradictory agreements was valid in the Sentence 89/1984 of September 28; it declares that the subject of the process is no longer, as in its preliminary phase, the councils and municipalities, but the new body.

After the sentence, there were several demonstrations in León in favor of the León alone option (see Leonesism), one of them according to some sources brought together a number close to 90 000 people, This was the highest concentration held in the city in the Democratic period until the demonstrations rejecting the 2004 Madrid train bombings.

In an agreement adopted on 31 July 1981, the Provincial Council of Segovia decided to exercise the initiative so that Segovia could be constituted as a uniprovincial autonomous community, but in the municipalities of the province the situation was equal between the supporters of the uniprovincial autonomy and the supporters of the union.

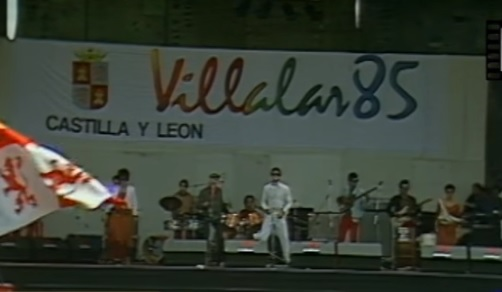
Celebration of the Villalar Day in 1985.

The City Council of Cuéllar initially adhered to this autonomic initiative in agreement adopted by the corporation on October 5, 1981. However, another agreement adopted by the same corporation dated December 3 of the same year revoked the previous one and the process was paralyzed pending the processing of an appeal filed by the provincial council against this last agreement; this change of opinion of the city council of Cuéllar tipped the scales in the province towards the autonomy with the rest of Castile and León, but it was an agreement that arrived out of time. Finally the province of Segovia was incorporated into Castile and León along with the other eight provinces and legal coverage was given through the Organic Law 5/1983 for "reasons of national interest", as provided for in article 144 c of the Spanish Constitution for those provinces that have not exercised their right on time.

Since 2019, the ayuntamientos of several municipalities of the province of León (including the capital's) have passed motions to propose the split of the provinces of the region of León from Castile and León and become a standalone autonomous community. As leonesism has traditionally been a fringe movement in the provinces of Zamora and Salamanca, some of these motions have limited to the prospect of a single-province autonomous community exclusively for León ('León solo').

== Symbols ==
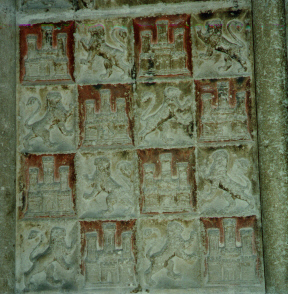
Checkered banner featuring the castle of Castile and the lion of León in the cathedral of Burgos.

The Statute of Autonomy of Castile and León, reformed most recently in 2007, establishes in the sixth article of its preliminary title the symbols of the community's exclusive identity. These are: the coat of arms, the flag, the banner and the anthem. Its legal protection is the same as that corresponding to the symbols of the State -whose outrages are classified as crime in article 543 of the Penal Code-.

In the articulated statuary, the coat of arms is defined as follows:

The coat of arms of Castile and León is a stamped shield by open royal crown, barracked in cross. The first and fourth quartering: in the field of gules, a merloned golden castle of three merlons, drafted of sable and rinse of azure. The second and third quartering: in a silver field, a rampant lion of purple, lingued, dyed and armed with gules, crowned with gold.

Likewise, the flag is described as follows:

The flag of Castile and León is quartered and contains the symbols of Castile and León, as described in the previous section. The flag will fly in all the centres and official acts of the Community, to the right of the Spanish flag.

Following the same wording, the banner is constituted by the shield quartered on a traditional crimson background. The Statute also expresses: "The anthem and the other symbols [...] will be regulated by specific law". After the promulgation of the fundamental norm, this law was not promulgated, so the anthem does not exist, but de iure is a symbol of autonomy.

== Geography ==
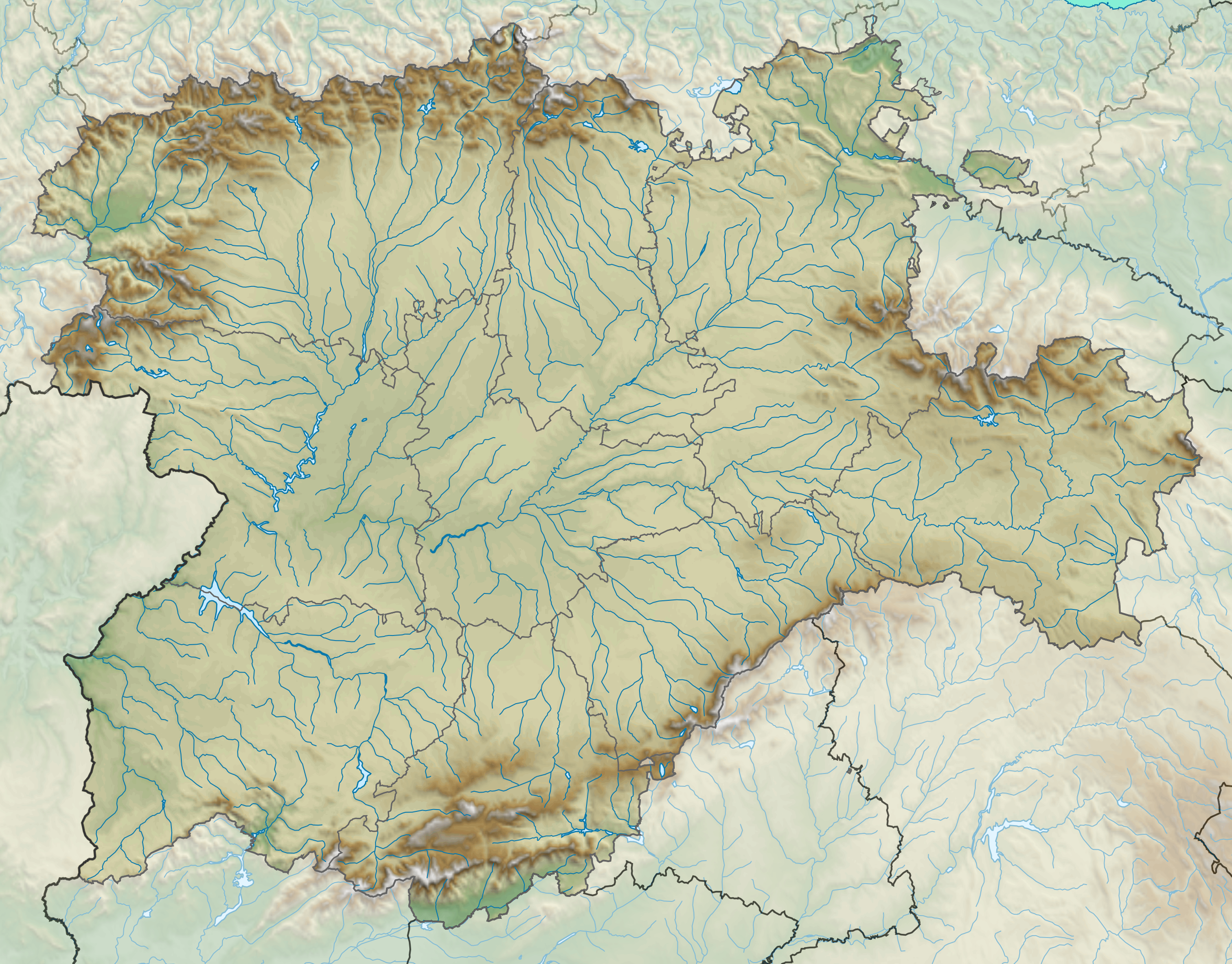
Map of the relief of the autonomous community

Castile and León is a landlocked autonomous community, located in the north-western quadrant of the Iberian Peninsula. Its territory borders on the north with the uniprovincial communities of Asturias and Cantabria, as well as with the Basque Country (Biscay and Álava); to the east with the uniprovincial community of La Rioja and with Aragon (province of Zaragoza), to the south with the Community of Madrid, Castile-La Mancha (provinces of Toledo and Guadalajara) and Extremadura (province of Cáceres) and to the west with Galicia (provinces of Lugo and Ourense) and Portugal (Bragança District and Guarda District).

=== Orography ===
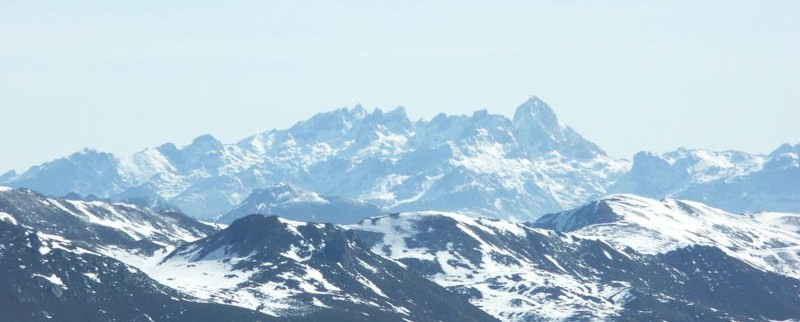
Picos de Europa in the province of León.

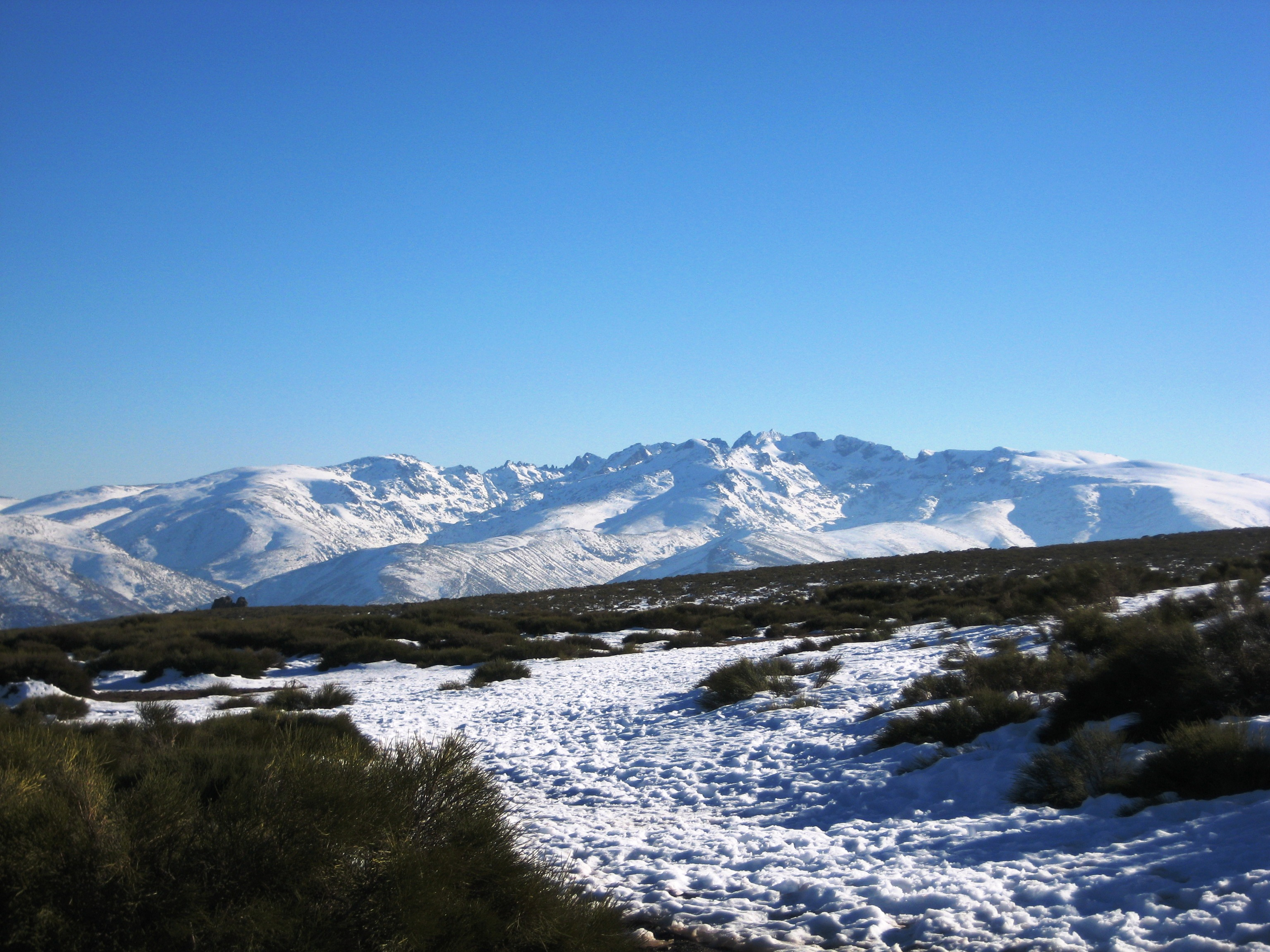
Sierra de Gredos range in the Sistema Central.

The morphology of Castile and León consists, for the most part, of the northern half of the Meseta Central (Meseta Norte) and a belt of mountainous reliefs. The Meseta Central is a high plateau with an average altitude close to 800 m (2,600 ft) above sea-level; it is covered by deposited clay materials that have given rise to a dry and arid landscape.

=== Geology ===
The Northern Plateau (Meseta Norte) is constituted by Paleozoic sockets. At the beginning of the Mesozoic Era, once the Hercynian folding that raised the current Central Europe and the Gallaeci zone of Spain, the deposited materials were dragged by the erosive action of the rivers.

During the alpine orogeny, the materials that formed the plateau broke through multiple points. From this fracture rose the mountains of León, with mountains of not much height and, constituting the spine of the Plateau (Meseta), the Cantabrian Mountains and the Sistema Central, formed by materials such as granite or metamorphic slates.

The karst complex of Ojo Guareña, consisting of 110 km of galleries and its caves formed in carbonatic materials of Coniacian which are situated on a level of impermeable marls, is the second largest of the peninsula.

This geological configuration has allowed upwellings of mineral-medicinal or thermal water, used now or in the past, in Almeida de Sayago, Boñar, Calabor, Caldas de Luna, Castromonte, Cucho, Gejuelo del Barro, Morales de Campos, Tresacasas, Valdelateja and Villarijo, among other places.

=== Hydrography ===
==== Rivers ====
Douro basin

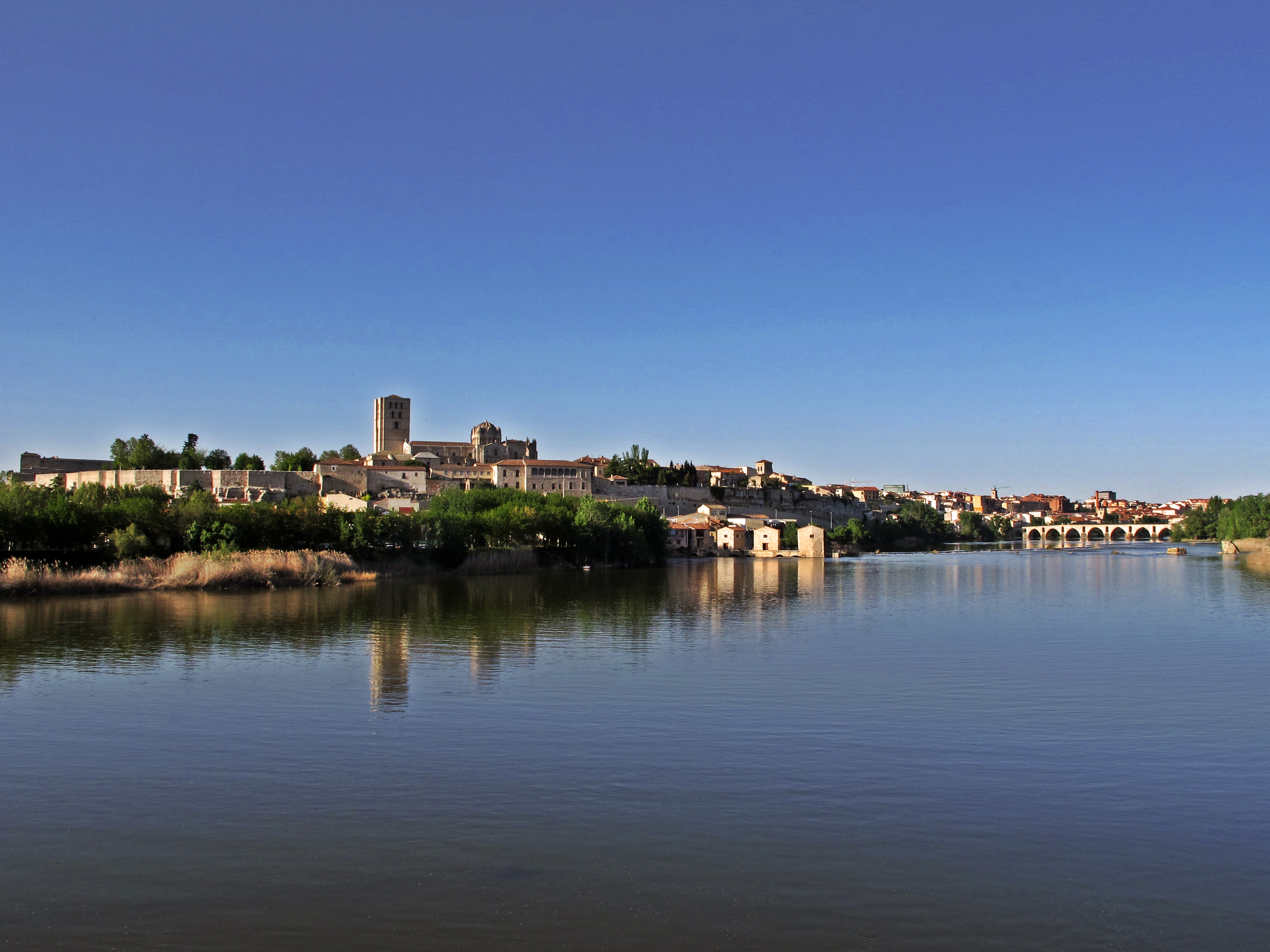
The Douro passing through Zamora.

The main hydrographic network of Castile and León is constituted by the Douro river and its tributaries. From its source in the Picos de Urbión, in Soria, to its mouth in the Portuguese city of Porto, the Douro covers 897 km. From the north descend the Pisuerga, the Valderaduey and the Esla rivers, its tributaries more plentiful and by the east, with less water in its flows, highlight the Adaja and the Duratón. After passing the town of Zamora, the Douro is confined between the canyons of the Arribes del Duero Natural Park, bordering with Portugal. On the left bank are important tributaries such as Tormes, Huebra, Águeda, Côa and Paiva, all from Sistema Central. On the right they reach the Sabor, the Tua and the Tâmega, born in the Galician Massif. After the Arribes area, the Douro turns west into Portugal until it empties into the Atlantic Ocean.

Other watersheds

Several rivers of the community pour their waters into the Ebro basin, in Palencia, Burgos and Soria (Jalón river), that of Miño-Sil in León and Zamora, that of the Tagus in Ávila and Salamanca (rivers Tiétar and Alberche and Alagón respectively) and Cantabrian basin in the provinces through which the Cantabrian Mountains extends.

==== Lakes and reservoirs ====
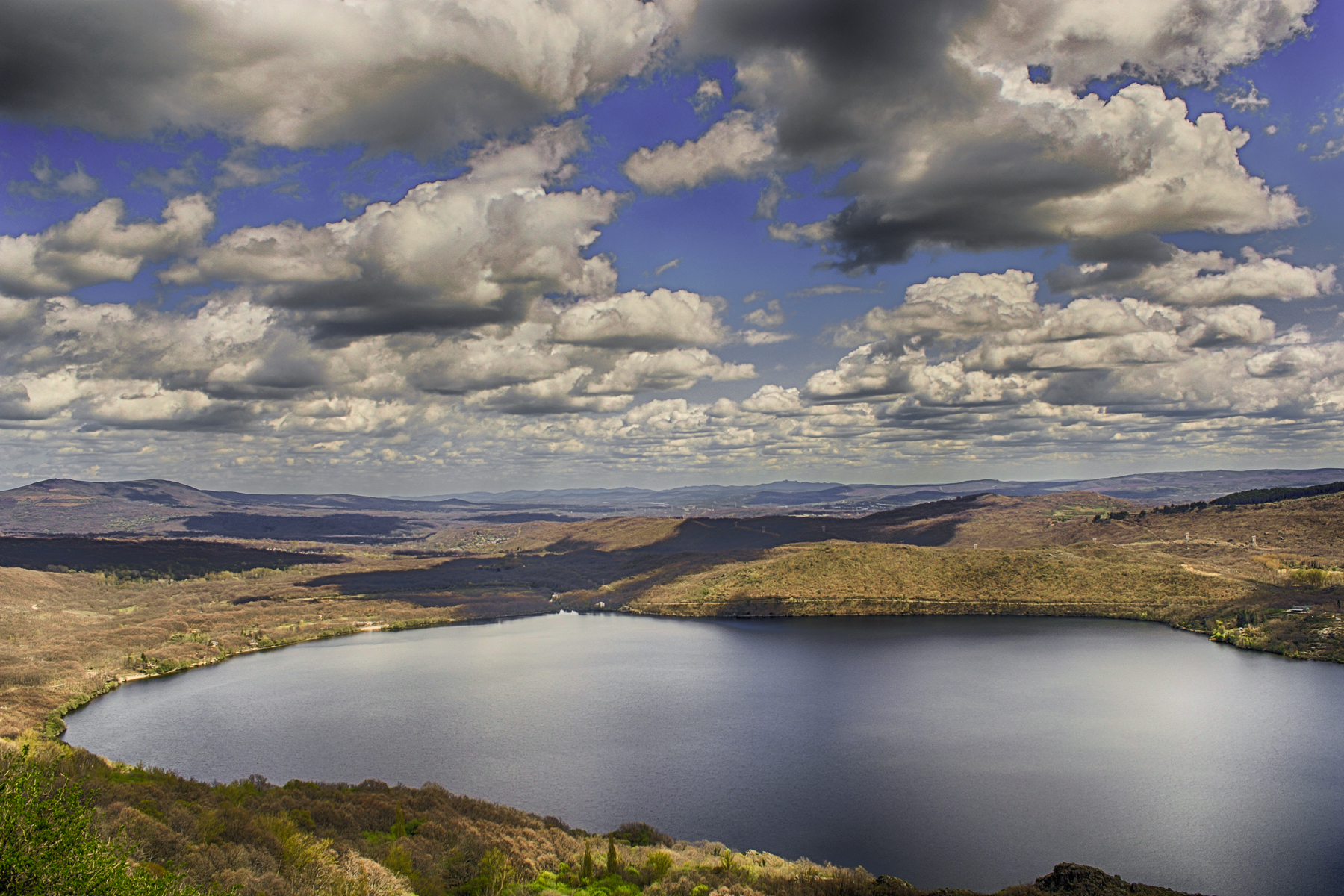
Of glacial origin, the Sanabria Lake is the largest natural freshwater lake in Spain.

In addition to the rivers, the Douro basin also hosts a large number of lakes and lagoons such as the Negra de Urbión Lake, in the Picos de Urbión, the Grande de Gredos Lake, in Gredos, the Sanabria Lake, in Zamora or the La Nava de Fuentes Lake in Palencia. Also emphasize a great amount of reservoirs, fed by the water coming from the rains and the thaw of the snowy summits. Thus, Castile and León, despite not having abundant rainfall, is one of the communities in Spain with the highest level of water dammed.

Many of these natural lakes are being used as an economic resource, boosting rural tourism and helping to conserve ecosystems. The Sanabria Lake was a pioneer in this.

=== Climate ===
Castile and León has a continental Mediterranean climate, with long, cold winters, with average temperatures between 3 and 6 °C in January and short, hot summers (average 19 to 22 °C), but with the three or four months of summer aridity characteristic of the Mediterranean climate. Rainfall, with an average of 450–500 mm per year, is scarce, accentuating in the lower lands.

Climatic factors

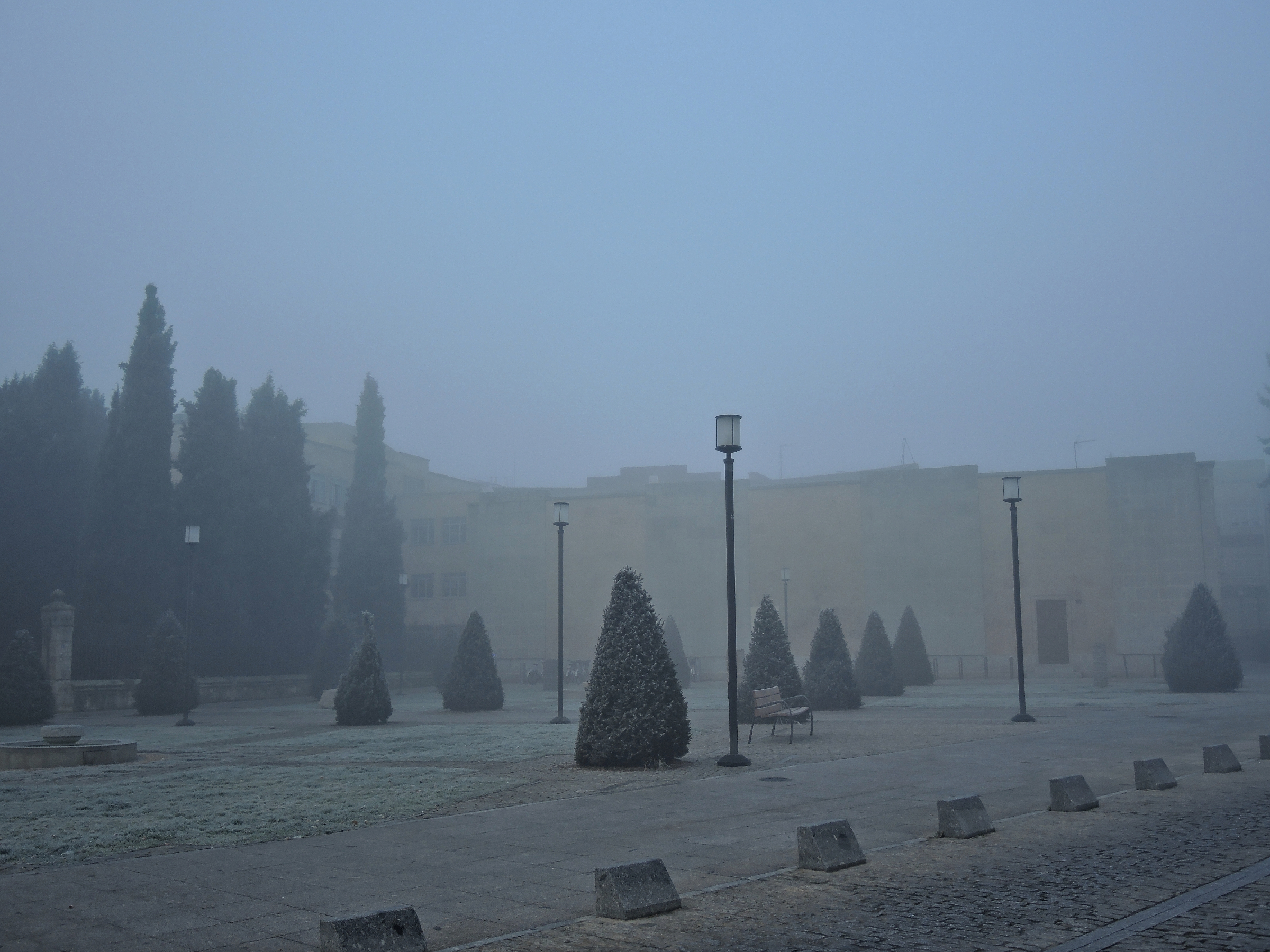
30 December 2016 in Salamanca. Radiation fog episodes and frosts are common in the region throughout anticyclonic configurations in Winter.

In Castile and León the cold extends almost continuously for much of the year, being a very characteristic element of its climate. The coldest periods of winter are associated with invasions of a continental polar front and strata of marine arctic air, rare is that they do not reach temperatures of the order of -5 ° to -10 °C. Likewise, in situations of anticyclone, in the interior of the region they cause persistent fogs, creating prolonged cold situations due to radiation processes. The intense "cold waves" of the winter central months are typical, showing a particular tendency to occur from the second fortnight of December to the first of February. During its course the most extreme minimum temperatures occur, whose values vary between -10 ° and -13 °C of its westernmost sector and -15 ° and -20 °C of the central plains and high moorlands. The lowest recorded records reach -22 °C of Burgos, -21.9 °C in Coca (Segovia), -20.4 °C in Ávila, -20 °C in Salamanca and -19.2 °C in Soria. The high altitude of the Meseta and its mountains accentuates the contrast between winter and summer temperatures, as well as day and night temperatures.

Maritime winds are stopped by the mountainous barriers that surround Castile and León, stopping also the precipitations and causing the rains to fall very unequally in the Castilian and Leonese territory. While in the middle of the Douro basin there is an annual average of 450 mm, in the western regions of the mountains of León, the Cantabrian Mountains and the southern area of the provinces of Ávila and Salamanca, rainfall reaches 1500 mm per year, with a maximum of 3400 mm per year in the western part of the Sierra de Gredos, in the Candelario-Bejar Massif, which makes this area the rainiest not only from Spain, but from the Iberian Peninsula.

Climatic regions

Although Castile and León is framed within the continental climate, in its lands different climate domains are distinguished:

- According to the Köppen climate classification, a large part of the autonomous community falls within the Csb or Cfb variants, with the average of the warmest month below 22 °C but above 10 °C for five or more months.
- In several areas of the Meseta Central the climate is classified as Csa (warm Mediterranean), by exceeding 22 °C during the summer.
- In high elevations of the Cantabrian Mountains and mountain areas, there is a cold temperate climate with average temperatures under 3 °C in the coldest months and dry summers (Dsb or Dsc).

=== Nature ===
==== Flora ====
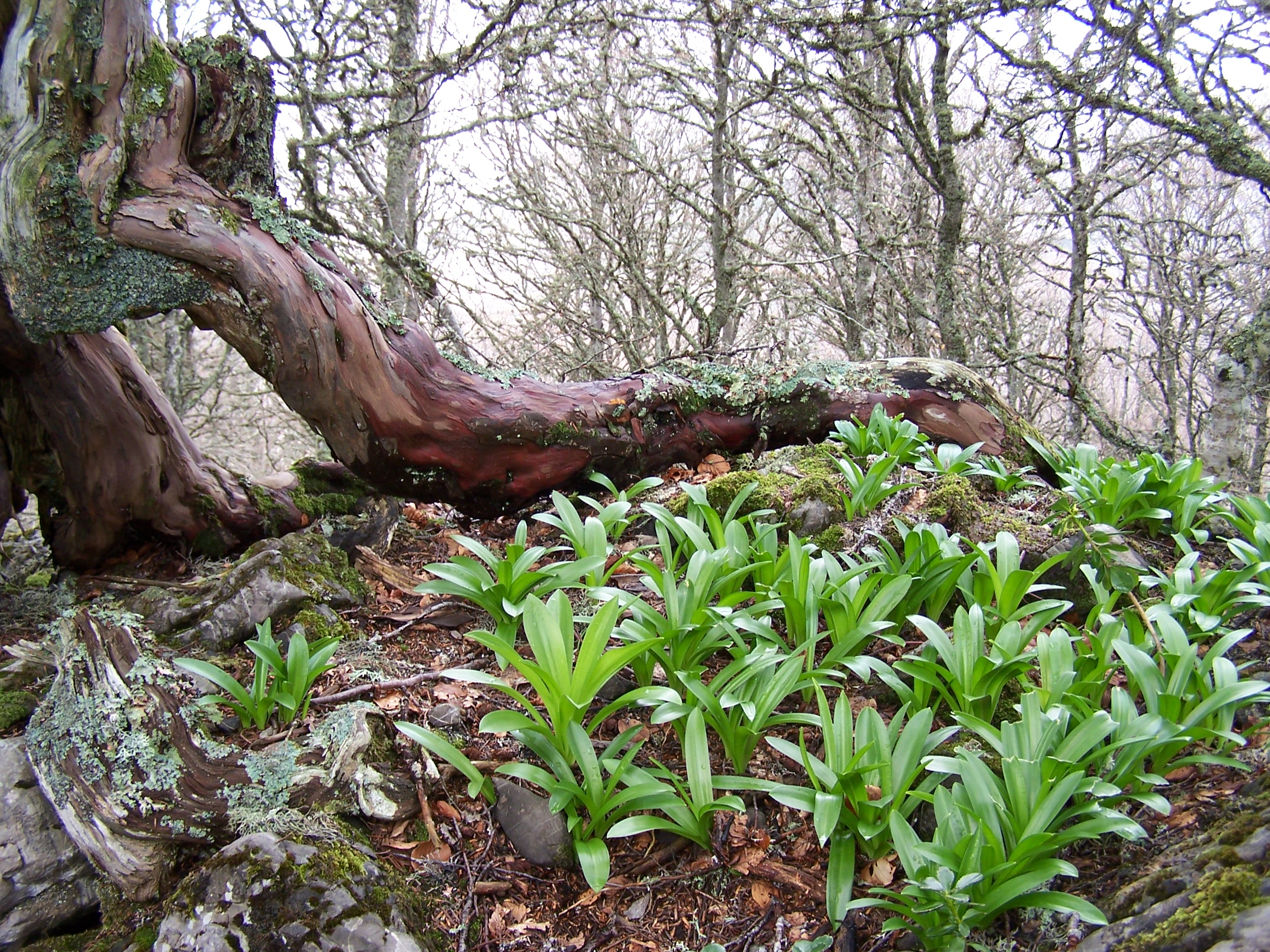
Canal de Asotín Beech, a UNESCO World Heritage Natural Site.

Castile and León has many protected natural sites. Actively collaborates with the European Union program Natura 2000. There are also some special protection area for birds or SPA. The solitary evergreen oaks and junipers (Juniperus sect. Sabina) that now draw the Castilian-Leonese plain are remnants of the forests that covered these same lands long ago. The agricultural holdings, due to the need of land for the cultivation of cereal and pastures for the immense herds of the Castilian Plateau, supposed the deforestation of these lands during the Middle Ages. The last Castilian and Leonese forests of junipers are found in the provinces of León, Soria and Burgos. They are not very leafy forests that can form mixed communities with evergreen oaks, Portuguese oaks or pines.

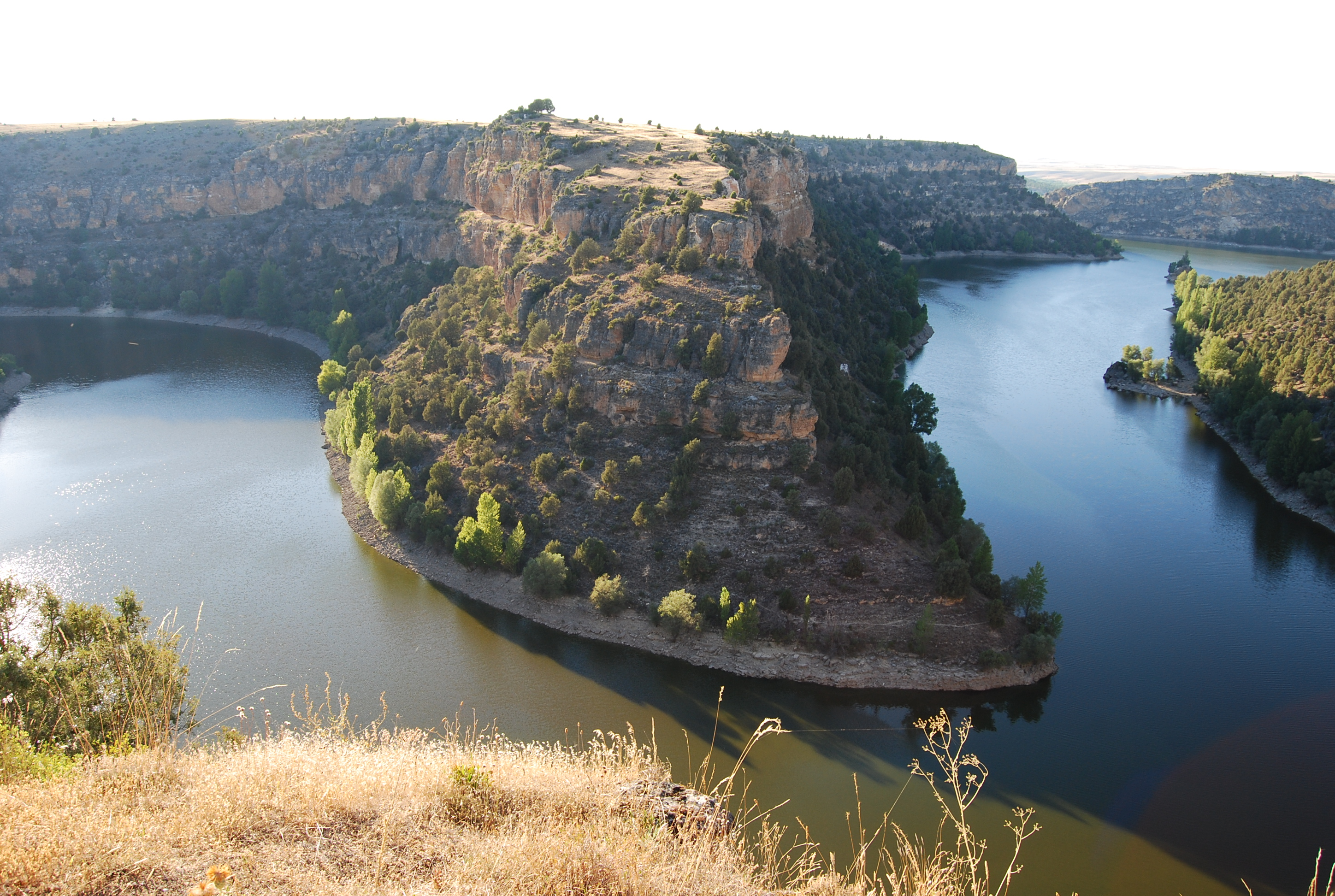
Hoces del Río Duratón Natural Park

The Castilian-Leonese slope of the Cantabrian Mountains and the northern foothills of the Sistema Ibérico have a rich vegetation. The most humid and fresh slopes are populated by large beeches, whose extension areas can reach 1,500 m altitude. In turn, the European beech forms mixed forests with the yew, the sorbus, the whitebeam, the European holly and the birch. On the sunny slopes the sessile oak, the European oak, the ash, the lime tree, the sweet chestnut, the birch and the scots pine (a typical species from the north of the province of León).

==== Fauna ====
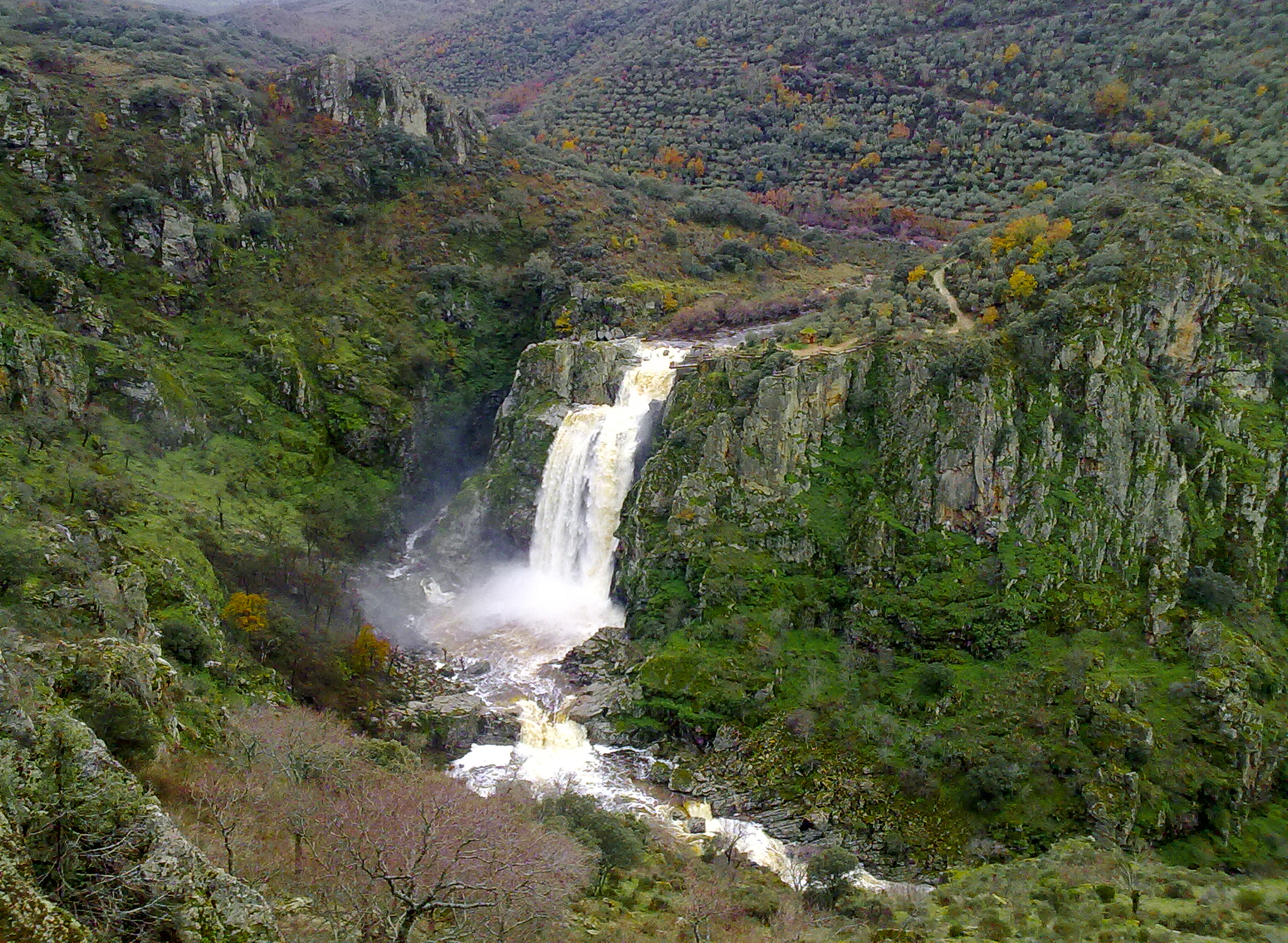
Arribes del Duero Natural Park, which is a special protection area for birds.

Castile and León presents a great diversity of fauna. There are numerous species and some of them are of special interest because of their uniqueness, such as some endemic species, or because of their scarcity, such as the brown bear. There have been counted 418 species of vertebrates, which make up 63% of all vertebrates that live in Spain. Animals adapted to life in the high mountains, inhabitants of rocky places, inhabitants of fluvial courses, species of plains and forest residents form the mosaic of the Castilian-Leonese fauna.

The isolation to which the high summits are subject leads to the existence of abundant endemisms such as the Spanish ibex, which in Gredos constitutes a unique subspecies in the Peninsula. The European snow vole is a graceful small mammal of grayish brown color and long tail that lives in open spaces over the limit of the trees.

Small and large mammals such as squirrel, dormouse, talpids, European pine marten, Beech marten, fox, wildcat, wolf, quite abundant in some areas, boar, deer, roe deer and, only in the Cantabrian Mountains, some specimens of brown bear tend to frequent the deciduous forests, although some species also extend to coniferous forests and scrubland. The wildcat is slightly larger than a domestic cat, has a short and stout tail, with dark rings and striped fur. The Iberian lynx, however, lives almost exclusively in areas of Mediterranean scrubland.

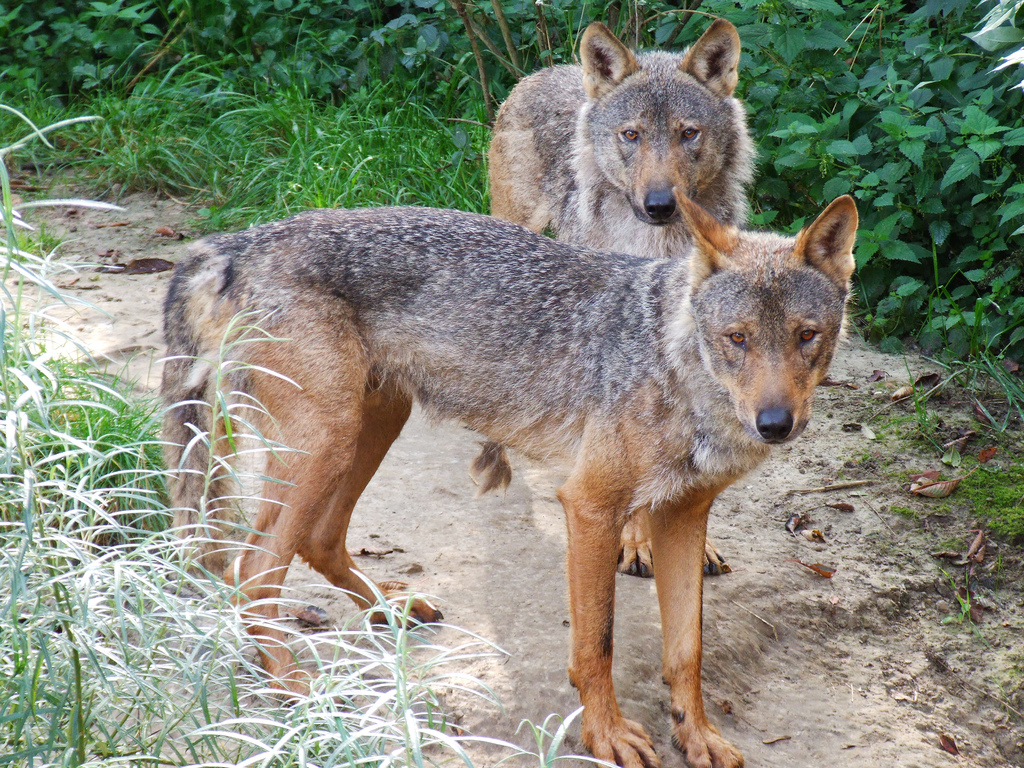
Castile and León is the main habitat of the Iberian wolf. The naturalist Félix Rodríguez de la Fuente promoted the protection of the species.

Small reptiles such as the ladder snake, the coronella girondica and the aesculapian snake are also found in this environment. The smooth snake can be found from sea level to 1,800 m in height and in the community it tends to live on the heights. Further up, in the rocky areas of the subalpine floor at about 2,400 m altitude the Iberian rock lizard lives, one of the few reptiles adapted at this point.

In the mountain rivers live the otter and desman and in its waters the trout, anguillidae, the common minnows and some of the increasingly scarce autochthonous river crabs. The otter and the desman are two mammals with aquatic habits and are swimmers. The otter feeds mainly on fish, while the desman seeks its food among the aquatic invertebrates that inhabit the riverbed. In lower sections of calmer waters swim barbels and carps. Among the amphibians, the salamanders and as species: the Almanzor salamander (Salamandra salamandra almanzoris) and the Gredos toad (Bufo bufo gredosicola), which are two endemic subspecies to the Sistema Central.

Where the rivers are encased forming sickles and canyons, rock-dwelling birds such as griffon vulture, cinereous vulture, Egyptian vulture, golden eagle or peregrine falcon. The Egyptian vulture, a small vulture, is black and white with a yellow head. Downstream and on its banks between the lush vegetation form their colonies the black-crowned night heron and the grey heron and the goldcrest, the eurasian penduline tit, the eurasian hoopoe and the common kingfisher.

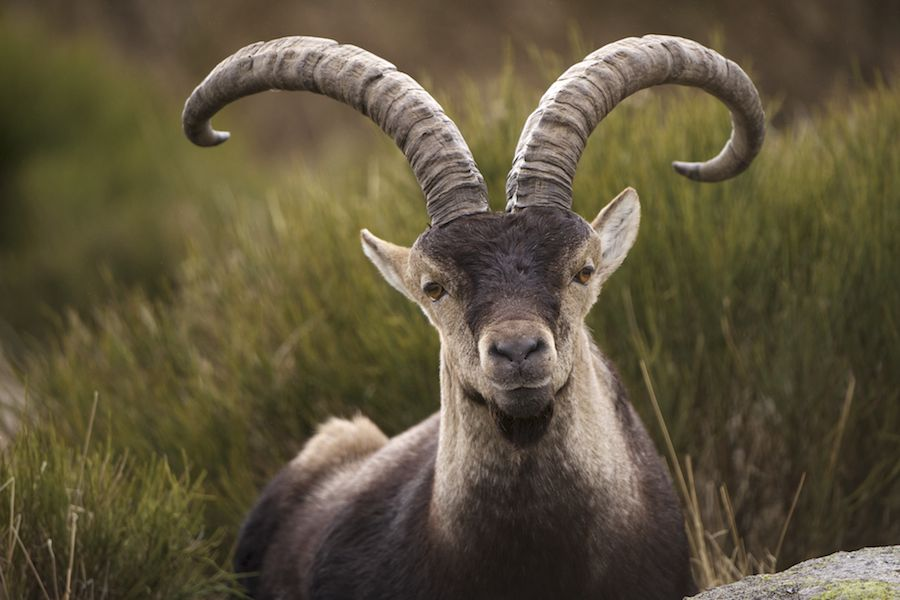
Western Spanish ibex, also called Gredos ibex (Capra pyrenaica victoriae), indigenous to Sierra de Gredos.

Among the birds that populate the open Mediterranean forests live two endangered species: the black stork and the Spanish imperial eagle. The black stork, much rarer than its congener the white stork, is of solitary habits and lives far from man. The Spanish imperial eagle nests in the trees and feeds mainly on rabbits, but also birds, reptiles and carrion.

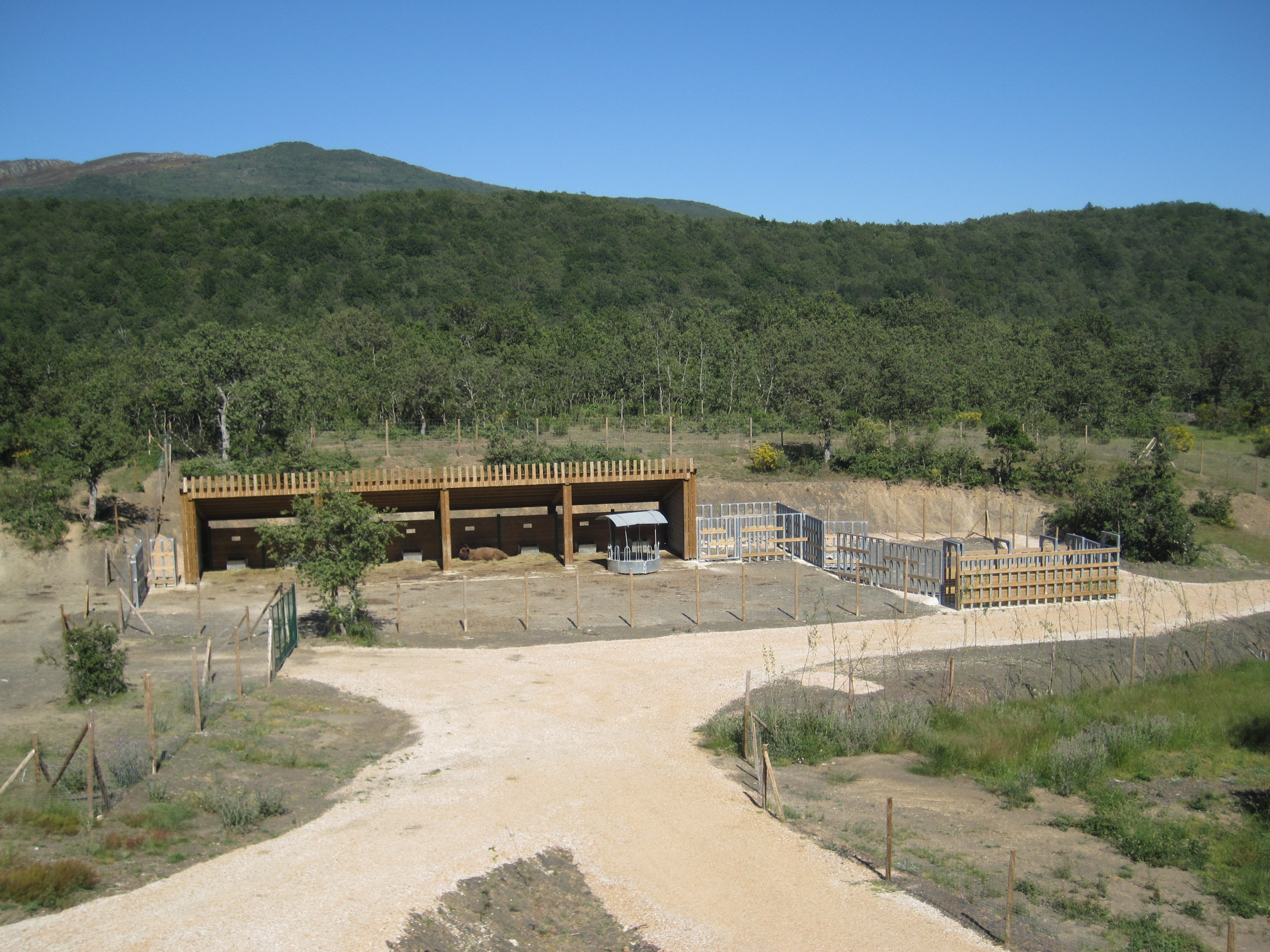
Part of the Reserve of European bison in San Cebrián de Mudá, province of Palencia.

In the coniferous forests live among others the short-toed treecreeper, the coal tit and the eurasian nuthatch, a bird of gray back and flanks reddish-orange that it nests in holes to which it narrows the entrance with mud. The western capercaillie is a very dark and large rooster that lives in forest environments, so it is very difficult to observe. Among the forest raptors are the accipiter, the eurasian sparrowhawk or the tawny owl, which frequently attack other smaller birds such as eurasian jay, iberian green woodpecker, fringilla, great spotted woodpecker and warbler.

The bustard frequents the open plains with rain-fed crops; It is large and has a grayish head and neck and a brown back. In the Castilian-Leonese wetlands during the winter many specimens of greylag goose, which breeds in northern Europe and visits the area in winter, are concentrated.

The naturalist Félix Rodríguez de la Fuente (1928 – 1980), natural from Poza de la Sal, stands out in the scientific study and its dissemination. He had a great research and made the leap to fame with the television series El hombre y la Tierra (TVE).

In the Montaña Palentina, in the municipality of San Cebrián de Mudá, a program of reintroduction of the European bison, animal that had been a thousand years without presence in the Iberian Peninsula, in order to avoid the extinction of the species.

== Demographics ==
Between the 1950s and the 1980s there was a massive rural flight with still persistent effects on the community.

Historical population
Year	Pop.	±%
1842	1,370,013	—
1857	2,083,129	+52.1%
1877	2,156,780	+3.5%
1887	2,294,061	+6.4%
1900	2,351,943	+2.5%
1910	2,458,917	+4.5%
1920	2,465,214	+0.3%
1930	2,575,131	+4.5%
1940	2,751,338	+6.8%
1950	2,884,540	+4.8%
1960	2,916,036	+1.1%
1970	2,668,289	−8.5%
1981	2,583,137	−3.2%
1991	2,545,926	−1.4%
2001	2,456,474	−3.5%
2011	2,540,187	+3.4%
2021	2,385,223	−6.1%
Source: INE

As of 2025, the population is 2,401,221, of which 49.3% are males, and 50.7% are females. Minors make up 13.7% of the population, and seniors make up 27.3%.

With around 25.5 inhabitants/km^{2}, Castile and León is the 2nd-least densely populated autonomous community in Spain, a record that is more than three times lower than the national average, which indicates that it is a sparsely populated and demographically decline, especially in rural areas and even in small traditional cities.

The life expectancy is higher than the Spanish average: 83.24 for women and 78.30 for men. A study by the University of Porto cites Castile and León as one of the European regions where old people could expect to live longer.

The active population in 2001 was 1,005,200 and occupied 884,200 people, with which the unemployment was 12.1% of the active population. For sectors of the employed population, 10.9% worked in agriculture, 20.6% in the industry, 12.7% in construction, and 63,1% in the services sector.

=== Historical evolution ===
Many of the people of the territory, who devoted themselves mostly to agriculture and livestock, gradually abandoned the area, heading towards urban areas, much more prosperous. This situation was further aggravated at the end of the Spanish Civil War, with a progressive rural emigration. During the 1960s and 1980s, large urban centers and provincial capitals suffered a slight demographic increase due to a thorough urbanization process, although, despite this, the Castilian-Leonese area continues to suffer serious depopulation. Only the provinces of Burgos, Valladolid and Segovia are gaining population in recent years.

There is also an increase in the population of metropolitan areas around cities such as Valladolid, Burgos or León. Due to this phenomenon, cities such as Laguna de Duero or San Andrés del Rabanedo have seen their population increase rapidly in a few years. The metropolitan area of the city of Valladolid is, by far, the largest in the autonomous community, with more than 430 000 inhabitants.

However, in absolute terms the autonomous community is losing population and aging. In 2011, it was one of only four autonomous communities that lost population along with Asturias, Galicia and Aragon.

=== Population distribution ===
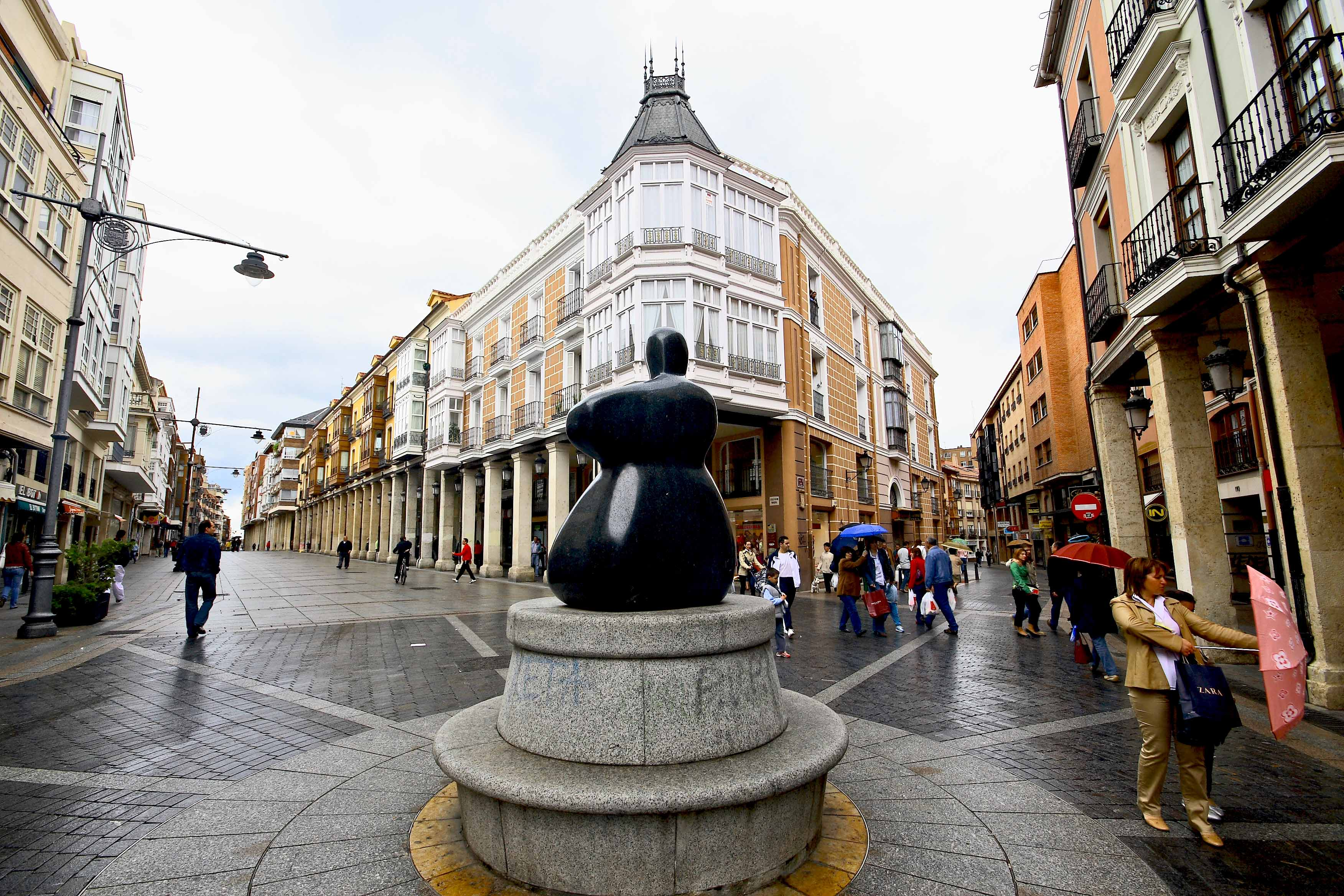
Calle Mayor street of Palencia. The city is within the most dynamic axis of the community.

In 1960 the urban population meant 20.6% of the total population of Castile and León; in 1991 this percentage had risen to 42.3% and in 1998 it was approaching 43%, which indicates the progressive rural depopulation. The phenomenon is also reflected in the number of municipalities with less than 100 inhabitants, which was multiplied by seven between 1960 and 1986. Outside the provincial capitals, the largest towns are Miranda de Ebro and Aranda de Duero in the province of Burgos, Ponferrada and San Andrés del Rabanedo in the province of León, Béjar in the province of Salamanca, El Espinar and Cuéllar in the province of Segovia, Arévalo in the province of Ávila, Benavente in the province of Zamora, El Burgo de Osma in the province of Soria, Aguilar de Campoo in the province of Palencia and Medina del Campo and Laguna de Duero in the province of Valladolid.

Of the 2,248 municipalities of Castile and León, the 2014 registry registered 1986 with less than 1,000 inhabitants; 204 from 1,001 to 5,000; 35 from 5,001 to 10,000; 8 of 10,001 to 20,000; 6 of 20,001 to 50,000; 5 of 50,001 to 100,000 and 4 municipalities with more than 100,000 inhabitants. As of 2025, the most populous municipality is Valladolid with a population of 301,798, and the least populous is Villanueva de Gormaz, with a population of 6.

Largest municipalities in Castile and León INE – 2025
Rank		Province	Pop.	Rank		Province	Pop.
1	Valladolid	Valladolid	301,798	11	Miranda de Ebro	Burgos	36,617
2	Burgos	Burgos	178,370	12	Aranda de Duero	Burgos	33,904
3	Salamanca	Salamanca	145,583	13	San Andrés del Rabanedo	León	29,996
4	León	León	124,091	14	Laguna de Duero	Valladolid	22,999
5	Palencia	Palencia	77,369	15	Arroyo de la Encomienda	Valladolid	22,778
6	Ponferrada	León	63,112	16	Medina del Campo	Valladolid	20,238
7	Zamora	Zamora	59,857	17	Villaquilambre	León	18,968
8	Ávila	Ávila	59,480	18	Benavente	Zamora	17,276
9	Segovia	Segovia	52,189	19	Santa Marta de Tormes	Salamanca	14,949
10	Soria	Soria	40,941	20	Béjar	Salamanca	11,990

=== Religion ===
Religion in Castile and León (2019)
Religion	Percent
Practicing Catholic	33.6%
Non-Practicing Catholic	43.2%
Agnostic	5.2%
Indifferent/non-believer	7.7%
Atheist	7.4%
Believer in another religion	1.7%
Unanswered	1.3%
Sample size: 2,667

Catholicism is the predominant religion in the community. According to the barometer of the Centro de Investigaciones Sociológicas (CIS) conducted in October 2019, 76.8% of Castilian-Leonese are considered Catholics (43.2 Non-Practising and 33.6% Practising), and non-believers 20.3%.

Actual attendance at a church is on average less than these figures show. According to the same study, only half of self identifying Catholics go to mass regularly with those considered "practicing" Catholics attending more regularly than those considered "non practicing".

=== Immigration ===
Foreign population by country of birth (2025)
Country	Population
Colombia	39,414
Morocco	33,111
Venezuela	21,939
Romania	18,930
Peru	15,883
Bulgaria	15,625
Dominican Republic	12,882
Ecuador	10,700
Portugal	9,572
France	8,400
Brazil	8,102
Argentina	7,843
Cuba	7,785
Honduras	7,630
Germany	4,371

As of 2025, immigrants make up 11.8% of the population. The 5 largest foreign countries of birth are Colombia, Morocco, Venezuela, Romania, and Peru.

=== Languages ===
Spanish is the only official and preponderant language throughout the territory. The phenomena of leísmo and laísmo are considered to be deviations characteristic of the varieties of Spanish spoken in the region, later irradiating to other territories.

In addition to Spanish (also referred to in the Spanish-speaking world as castellano; transl. 'Castilian'), other languages or linguistic varieties are spoken in small areas of Castile and León: the Leonese language, that "will be subject to specific protection [...] because of its particular value within the Community's linguistic heritage" and Galician language, which, according to the Statute of Autonomy, "will enjoy respect and protection in the places where it is usually used" (fundamentally, in the border areas with Galicia of the comarcas of El Bierzo and Sanabria). In the Salamancan comarca of El Rebollar, a modality of Extremaduran language is spoken (of the Asturian-Leonese branch) known as Palra d'El Rebollal. In Merindad de Sotoscueva (province of Burgos) a Castilian is spoken with some dialectal features of the Asturian-Leonese. In the Treviño enclave, as of 2012 about a fifth of the population spoke Basque. (Note: The Treviño enclave is thought to have been Basque-speaking up to the 17th or 18th century. In 2012, only about one quarter of the inhabitants had been born in the enclave, while about half of them had been born in the Basque Country, due to recent demographic movements; these movements are connected to the increase of Basque speakers.)

Languages spoken by some of the largest immigrant communities include Bulgarian, Romanian, and Arabic.

== Administration ==
The community is the sum of 9 provinces: Province of Ávila, Province of Burgos, Province of León, Province of Palencia, Province of Salamanca, Province of Segovia, Province of Soria, Province of Valladolid and Province of Zamora. The provincial capitals fall in the homonymous cities to their corresponding provinces.

The concurrence of some peculiar geographical, social, historical and economic characteristics is legally recognized for El Bierzo (an area that was a province on its own in the project of initial provincial division, though it disappeared in the 1833 territorial division of Spain), and the comarca of El Bierzo was created in 1991, with its center in Ponferrada. It is the only Castilian-Leonese territory recognized by law outside the normal provincial division, and it is administered by a Comarcal Council. Castile and León also includes the exclave of Treviño, surrounded by the Basque province of Araba/Álava.

Provinces of Castile and León

Province	Capital	Population (2025)	Area (km²)	Density (inh./km²)	Municipalities
Ávila	Ávila	160,738	8,049.04	20.0	248
Burgos	Burgos	362,663	14,288.63	25.4	371
León	León	448,030	15,578.32	28.8	211
Palencia	Palencia	158,702	8,051.95	19.7	191
Salamanca	Salamanca	328,446	12,348.35	26.6	362
Segovia	Segovia	158,251	6,922.58	22.9	209
Soria	Soria	90,183	10,306.98	8.7	183
Valladolid	Valladolid	528,644	8,110.51	65.2	225
Zamora	Zamora	165,564	10,561.21	15.7	248

=== Provision of services ===
Draft of UBOST presented in September 2015.

The new territorial arrangement approved by Law 7/2013, on Planning, Services and Government of the Territory of the Community of Castile and León, establishes that the geographical spaces delimited for the provision of services are the basic unit of territorial planning and services (UBOST) -urban or rural- and functional areas -stable or strategic-. Also, the new ordination determines that the mancommunities of common interest are entities for the fulfillment of their specific purposes, which may be declared when their territorial scope substantially agrees with an UBOST or several contiguous ones.

This ordination is still in the implementation phase, and in September 2015 the draft map dividing the autonomous community was presented in 147 rural UBOST and 15 urban UBOST.

=== Autonomous institutions ===
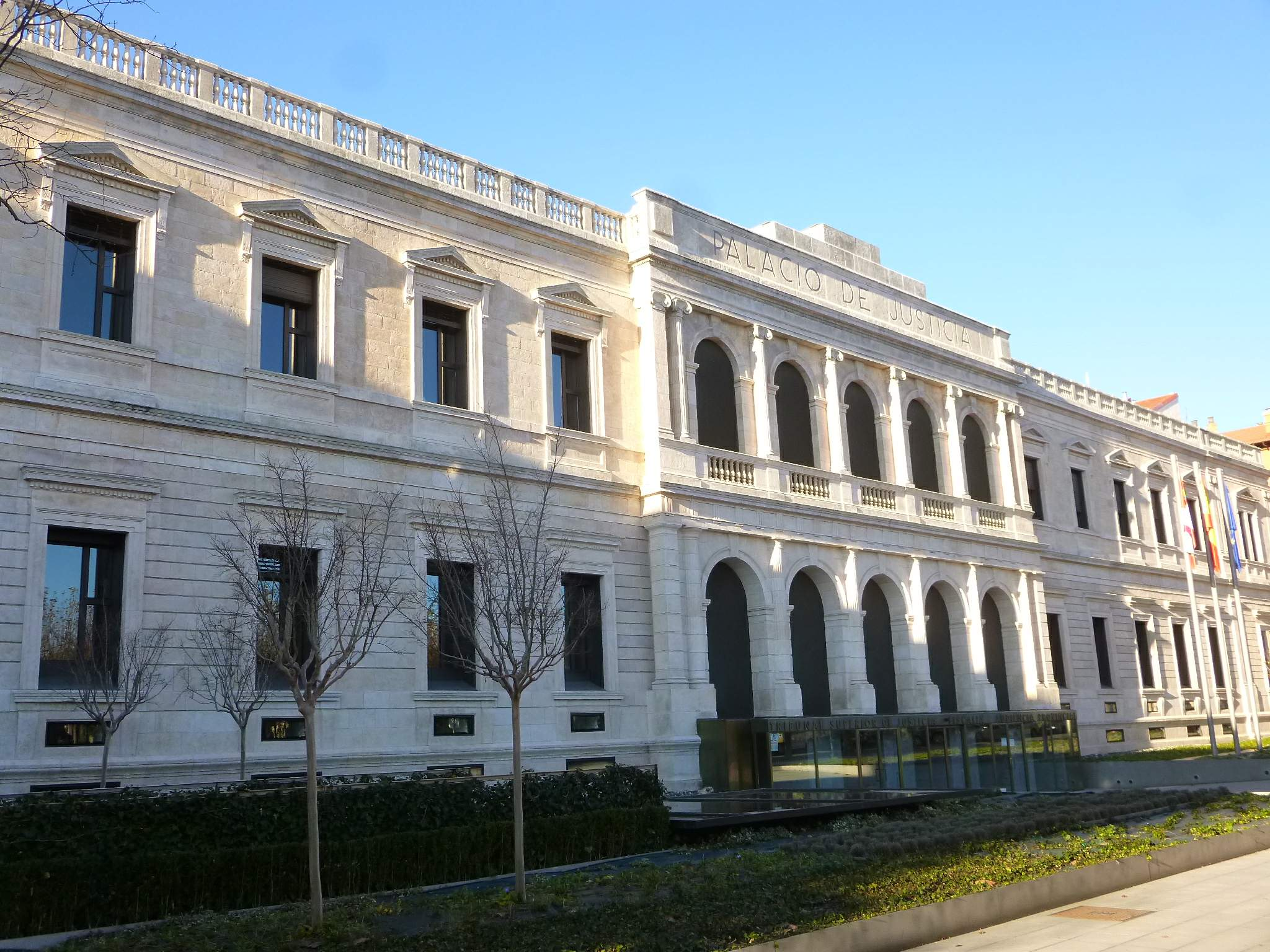
Palacio de Justicia, seat of the Upper Court of Justice of Castile and León, in Burgos.

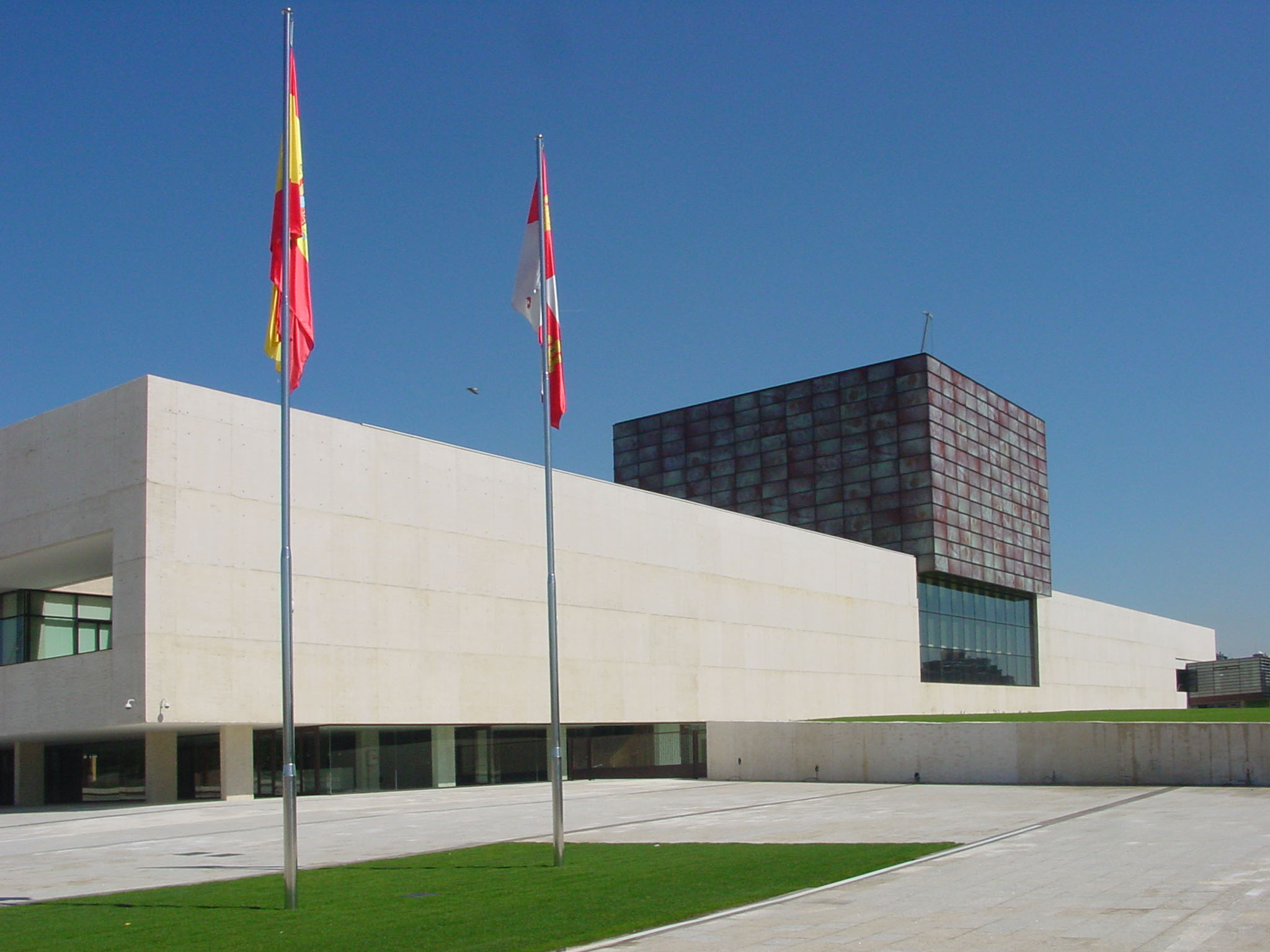
Seat of the Cortes of Castile and León in Valladolid. The city has an official status as seat of the legislature, government and president.

The main autonomous institutions are:

- Junta de Castilla y León (Regional Government of Castile and León), with headquarters in Valladolid, is the regional executive, formed by the President of the Regional Government, the vice presidents and the councilors
- Cortes de Castilla y León (Parliament of Castile and León), based in Valladolid
- Tribunal Superior de Justicia de Castilla y León (Upper Court of Justice of Castile and León), based in Burgos

The Statute of Autonomy does not explicitly establish one capital. Initially the Cortes were installed provisionally in Burgos; the possibility of fixing a capital in Tordesillas was also discussed, although the final decision was to install the Cortes provisionally in the castle of Fuensaldaña.

The region's 1983 statute of autonomy did not name a capital. The articles referred only to the "seat of government", that could only be fixed with a two-thirds approval in the Cortes of Castile and León. In 1987, President of the Junta of Castile and León José María Aznar approved that the basic bodies of regional rule – the presidency, Junta and the Cortes – would be located in Valladolid.

One reason for the lack of the official capital is that the merger of Castile and León as one autonomous community caused uproar in the latter, which wanted to be separate. Other autonomous bodies are in the capitals of other provinces of the region. The High Court of Justice of Castile and León is in Burgos, the Court of Audits is in Palencia, the Advisory Council is in Zamora, the Ombudsman is in León.

In March 2009, the Junta of Castile and León apologised for school textbooks that named Valladolid as capital, saying that it was an honest confusion of its status as a seat. In February 2010, the People's Party in Valladolid City Hall rejected a Spanish Socialist Workers' Party proposal for the city to become the official capital, saying it could "provoke eight motions against it" from the other provincial capitals. In September 2019, José Antonio de Santiago Juárez of Valladolid's PP made a proposal of the same matter, which was opposed by the party leadership.

=== Cortes of Castile and León ===
During the first legislature, the Spanish Socialist Workers' Party was the party with the most representation in Cortes, being the first president of the community the Socialist Demetrio Madrid. Since the 1990s, regional policy has been framed by a series of absolute majorities of the People's Party, which continues to comfortably govern at present. Other national parties with presence in the community, either locally or regionally, are United Left (previously as Communist Party of Spain) and Union, Progress and Democracy, with a significant presence in the provinces of Ávila and Burgos. Previously Democratic and Social Centre of Adolfo Suárez also managed to be in the regional political life occupying the reformist center of the political spectrum.

The Leonesism through the Leonese People's Union, the Castilianism through Party of Castile and León, previously Commoners' Land or localistas parties like Independent Solution, Group of Zamoran Independent Electoral Members or Initiative for the Development of Soria have also had their presence, although at a lower level.

The community is governed by Alfonso Fernández Mañueco, of the People's Party. This party obtained 29 procurators in the 2019 Castilian-Leonese regional election. Mañueco's investiture was supported by the party Citizens, with 12 representatives. The party that obtained the most seats at the election, the Spanish Socialist Workers' Party is in opposition, with 35 representatives. The leader of the opposition is Luis Tudanca. In addition, four more formations obtained parliamentary representation in the region: Podemos (2 seats), Vox (1), XÁvila (1) and Leonese People's Union (1).

A 2024 law passed by the regional Castile and León coalition (including Vox and the People's Party) omitted any mention of General Franco as a dictator, which sparked criticism.

=== Human rights ===
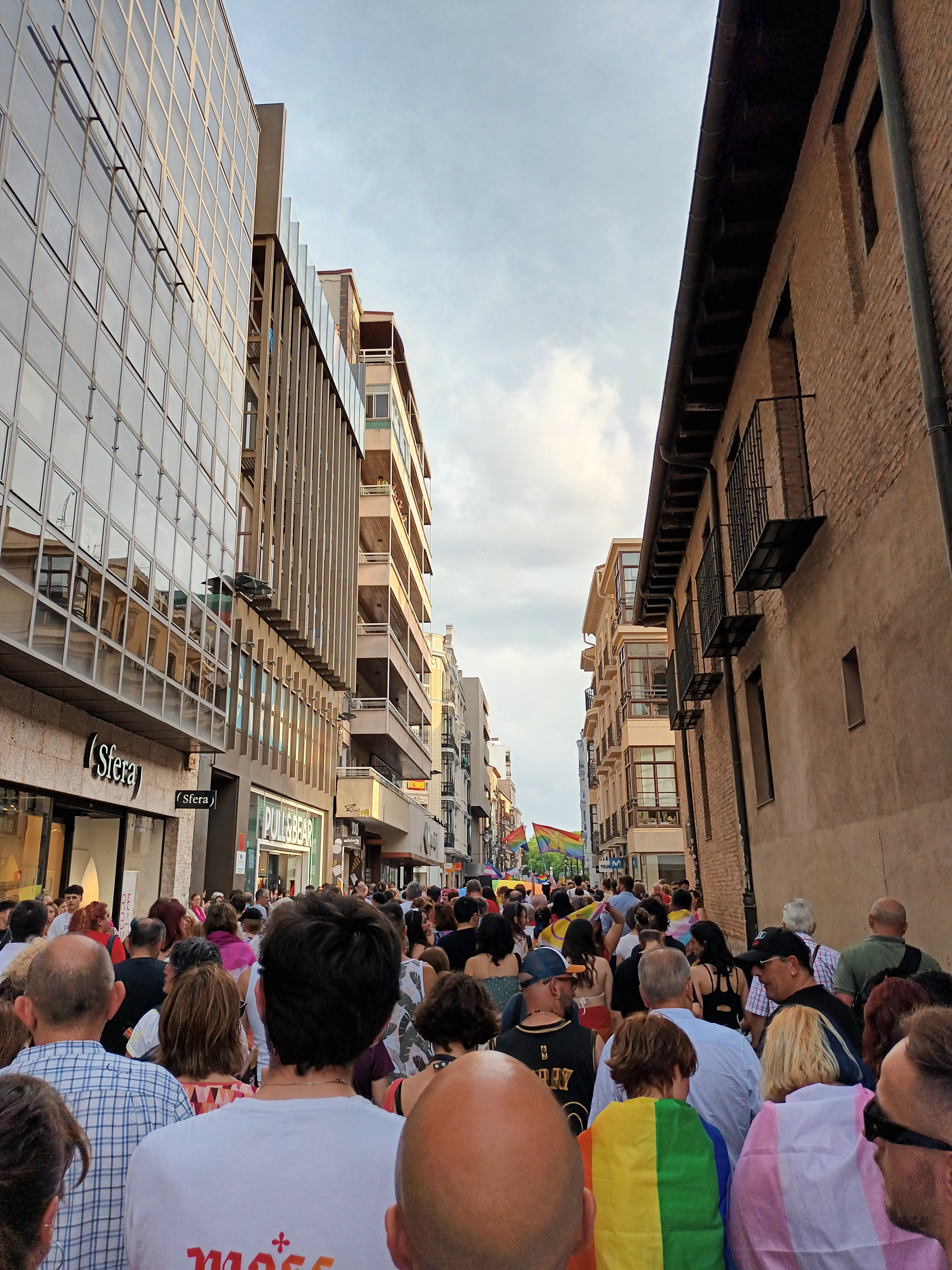
Valladolid LGBTQ+ Pride 2024.

The roots of modern human rights theories has its origins in Castile and León. The School of Salamanca was an intellectual movement of 16th-century where humanism raised, being its major contributor Francisco de Vitoria.

The Valladolid debate was the first moral debate in European history to discuss the rights and treatment of Indigenous people by European colonizers.

Castile and León is the only autonomous region in Spain without a specific regional law protecting LGBTQ+ citizens. Several LGBTQ+ organizations exists in the region, such as Segovia Entiende, Espacio Seguro LGBTQ+ Burgos, Chiguitxs LGTB+ Palencia, Arco Ávila, Awen León or Fundación Triangulo Castilla y León.

Since 2022 the Festival Zorrilla's Fest is celebrated annually in Valladolid during Pride Week to promote LGBTQ+ artists and local LGBTQ+ engagement. Since then artists such as Samantha Hudson, Putochinomaricón, Javiera Mena or Tremenda Jauría have performed in the Festival.

The first transgender person in Spain to reach Professor level at University is Marina Sáenz, in the Law School of Valladolid University.

Abortion law is applied as in the rest of the country, but women might suffer difficulties due to the high proportion of medical practitioners objecting to practise abortions.

== Economy ==
The gross domestic product (GDP) of the autonomous community was 57.9 billion euros in 2018, accounting for 4.8% of Spanish economic output. GDP per capita adjusted for purchasing power was 25,800 euros or 85% of the EU27 average in the same year. The GDP per employee was 97% of the EU average.

=== Unemployment rate ===
In July 2009, in full Great Recession, unemployment reached 14.14% of the population, when in 2007 it was half, 6,99%. According to the survey of the employment of the fourth quarter of 2014, the employment rate is 54.91% and the unemployment rate is 20.28%, while the national figure is 59,77% of employment and 23.70% of unemployed. Below the regional average of unemployment are Segovia (14.33%), Valladolid (16.65%), Soria (16.96%) and Burgos (18.76%), while above Salamanca (21,25%), León (22.65%), Palencia (23.22%), Ávila (25.33%) and Zamora (26.62%).

The unemployment rate stood at 14.1% in 2017 and was slightly lower than the national average.

Year	2006	2007	2008	2009	2010	2011	2012	2013	2014	2015	2016	2017
unemployment rate (in %)	8.1%	7.1%	9.6%	14.0%	15.8%	16.9%	19.8%	21.7%	20.8%	18.3%	15.8%	14.1%

=== Primary sector ===
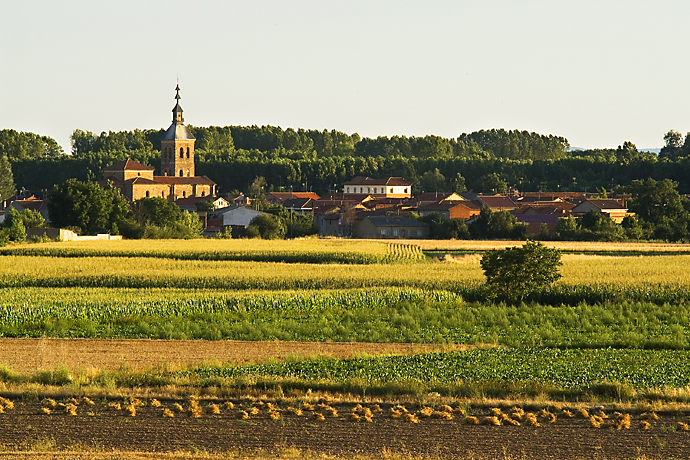
Villarejo de Órbigo, typical rural town of the Ribera del Órbigo and of Tierra de Campos comarcas.

Field

The fields of Castile and Leon are arid and dry although very fertile, predominating in them the dryland farming. Despite this, irrigation has been gaining importance in the areas of the valleys of Douro, Esla, Órbigo, Pisuerga and Tormes. The scarce orography and the improvement of communications has favored the entry of technical innovations throughout the process of agricultural production, especially in areas such as the province of Valladolid or the province of Burgos where the production per hectare is one of the highest in Spain. The most fertile Castilian-Leonese area coincides with the Esla valley, in León, in the fields of Valladolid and Tierra de Campos, a district that extends between province of Zamora, province of Valladolid, province of Palencia and province of León.

Use of arable land

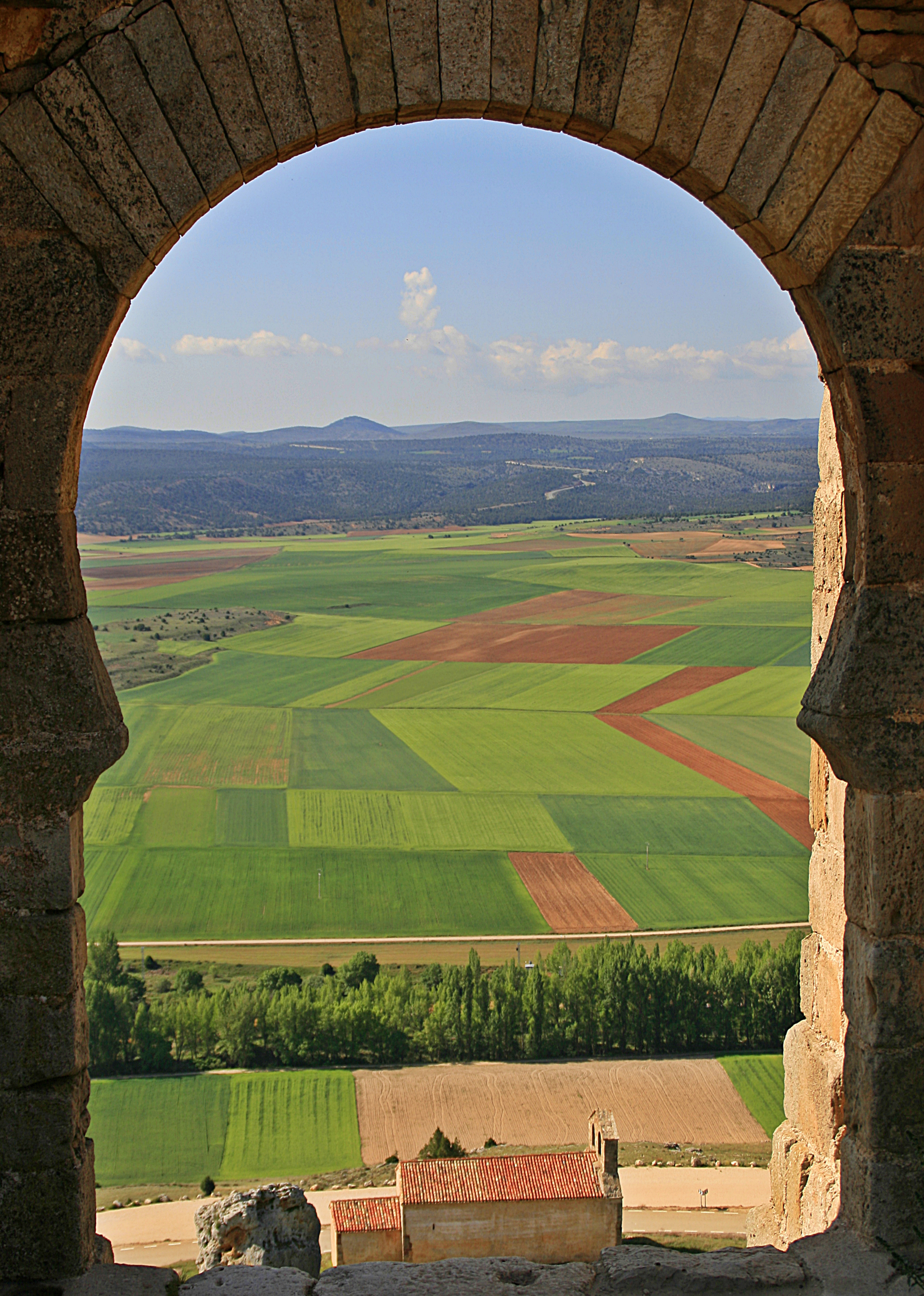
The Meseta Central is a large plateau ranging a considerable part of the region of Castile. In the image a landscape of the Meseta Central viewed from the castle of Gormaz.

Castile and León has an agricultural area close to 5,783,831 hectares, which is more than half of the total area of its total territory. Most of the farmland is dryland, due to the climate and the low rainfall. Only 10% of the area is irrigated, with plots of intensive production, much more profitable than dryland crops.

Despite the decline of the population in rural areas, the Castilian-Leonese agricultural production still represents 15% of the Spanish primary sector and its average occupation is lower than that of other autonomous communities.

Types of crop

Wines with denominación de origen of Castile and León

Castile and León constitutes one of the main Spanish cereal areas. As the popular saying says: "Castile, granary of Spain". Although the most traditional crop was wheat, the production of barley has gained ground since the 1960s. These two cereals are followed, in number of hectares cultivated and volume of production, rye and oats. In addition to legumes, such as carob and chickpeas, sunflower cultivation has spread in the southern countryside.

The vineyard (56,337 ha) saw the number of hectares cultivated during the last three decades of the 20th century decrease considerably; However, the application of the most modern aging techniques has notably improved the Castilian-Leonese wines, which compete in quality with those of La Rioja and begin to be known outside the Spanish borders. The main viticultural areas of the region are Ribera del Duero (DO), Rueda (DO), Toro (DO), Bierzo (DO), Arribes (DO) and Tierra de León (DO). Irrigated land is planted with sugar beet, a product that has been subsidized by the regional authorities, potatoes, alfalfa and vegetables. In the province of León, corn, hops and legumes are also sown.

Livestock

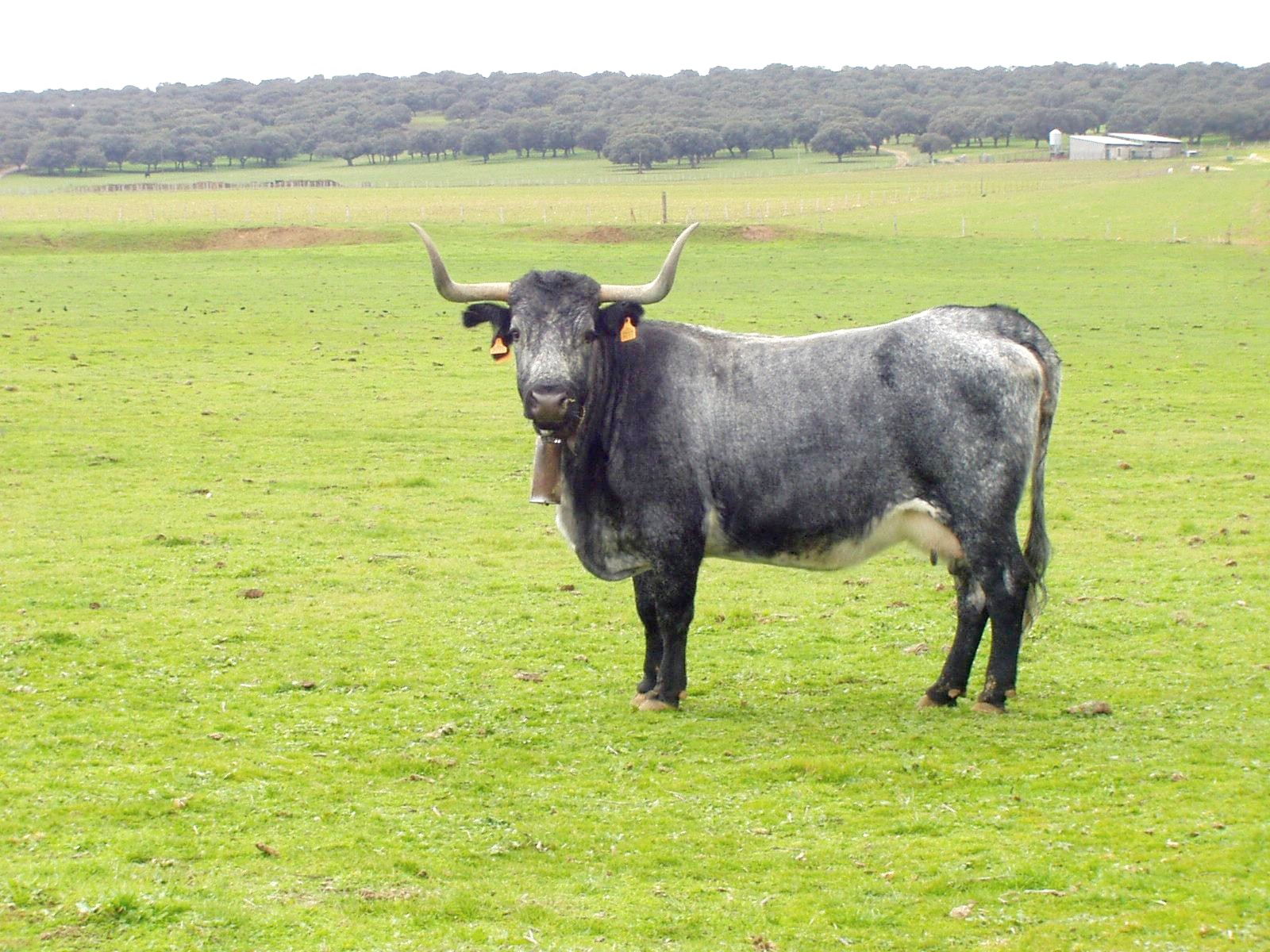
Morucha cow in a dehesa of Campo Charro, place of production of Jamón de Guijuelo.

Livestock represents an important part of the final agricultural production. Next to the small livestock units, which proliferate in the regions of pre-eminent agricultural dedication or in the mountain areas, now appears a modern livestock activity, with cattle, pig and sheep farms, of development. These farms are oriented both to the production of meat and to the supply of milk to the cooperatives that channel their subsequent commercialization, since the dairy production of Castile and León -more than one and a half million liters per year- is the second largest in Spain, only surpassed by Galicia.

Thus, small livestock farms tend to disappear, largely due to the effect of rural depopulation and the consequent loss of labor. Transhumant grazing is conserved in some areas; large herds, mainly sheep, travel every year hundreds of kilometers from the flat lands to the land with mountain pastures as in the El Bierzo, the Cantabrian valleys of province of León, the sierra de Gredos or Picos de Urbión. It is hard work that every time has less labor, having previously constituted a testimony of first importance on the history and cultural roots of the Castilian and Leonese people.

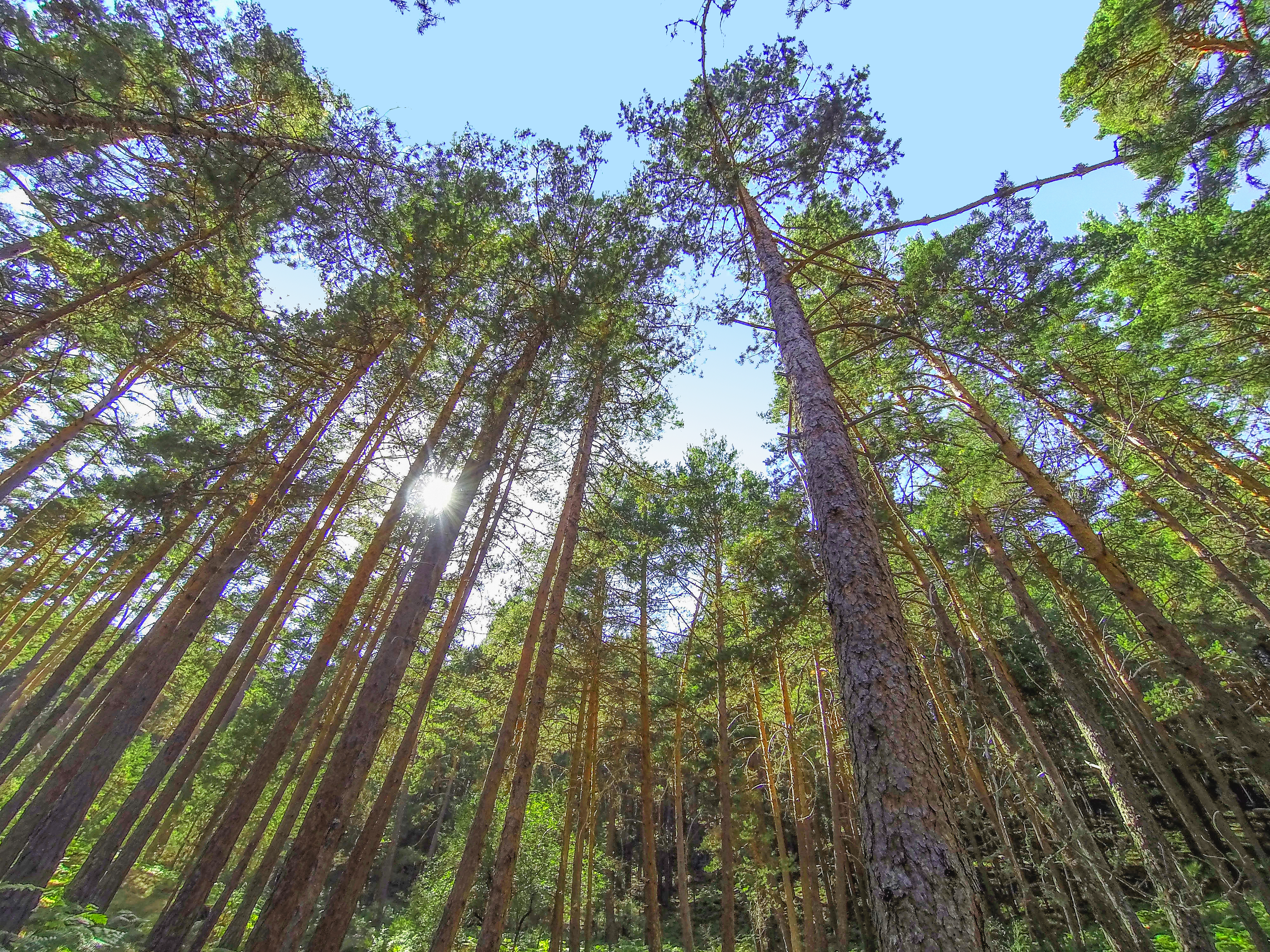
Pines in Valle de Valsaín.

The sheep herd is the most numerous, with 5,425,000 heads, followed by domestic pig (2,800,000) and cattle (1,200,000). A long way away is the goats (166,200 heads) and horses (71,700 horses, mules and donkeys). The highest production of meat corresponds to that of pigs (241,700 t), followed by bovine (89,400 t) and poultry (66,000 t); in wool production Castile and León leads the national balance with 7,500 t. Within the section of Protected Geographical indication (I.G.P), highlights Lechazo de Castilla y León, based in Aranda de Duero.

Forest exploitation

In Castile and León there are about 1,900,000 hectares of non-arboreal, representing 40% of the total forest area. This deforestation is mainly due to the hand of the man who, over the centuries, has made forests disappear, giving way to areas of non-arboreal vegetation. Little by little, with the abandonment of rural areas and the reforestation policy of the Castilian and Leonese governments, this situation has been reversed.

=== Secondary sector ===
Industry

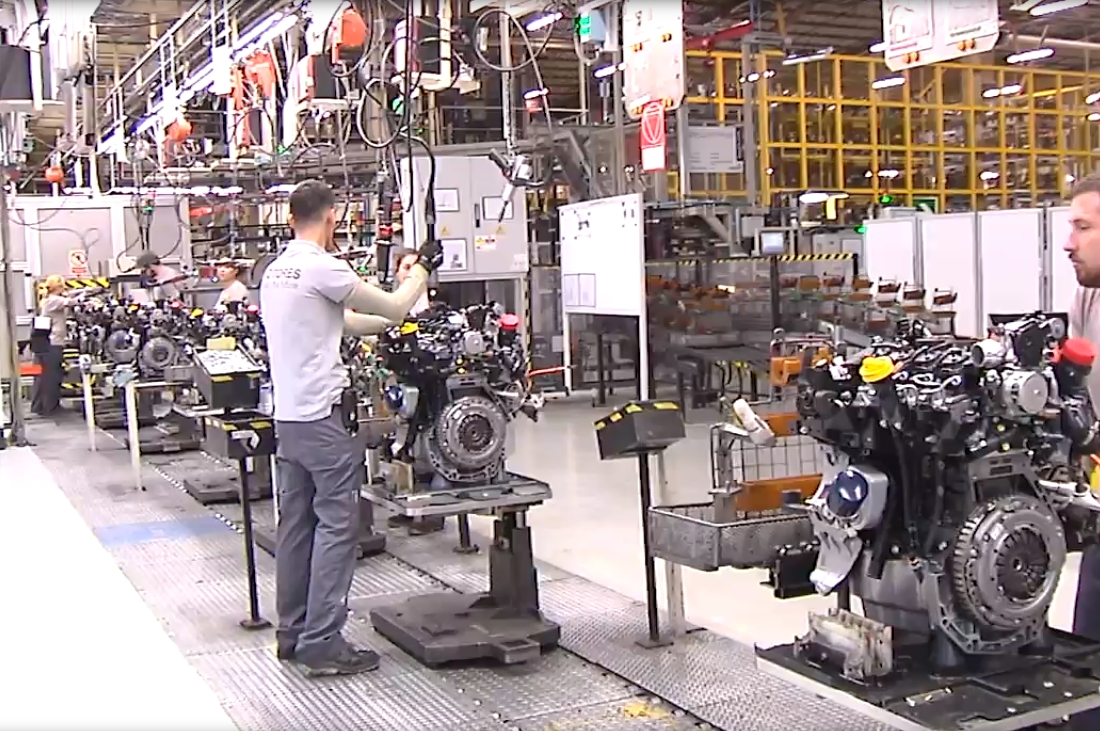
Renault factory in Valladolid

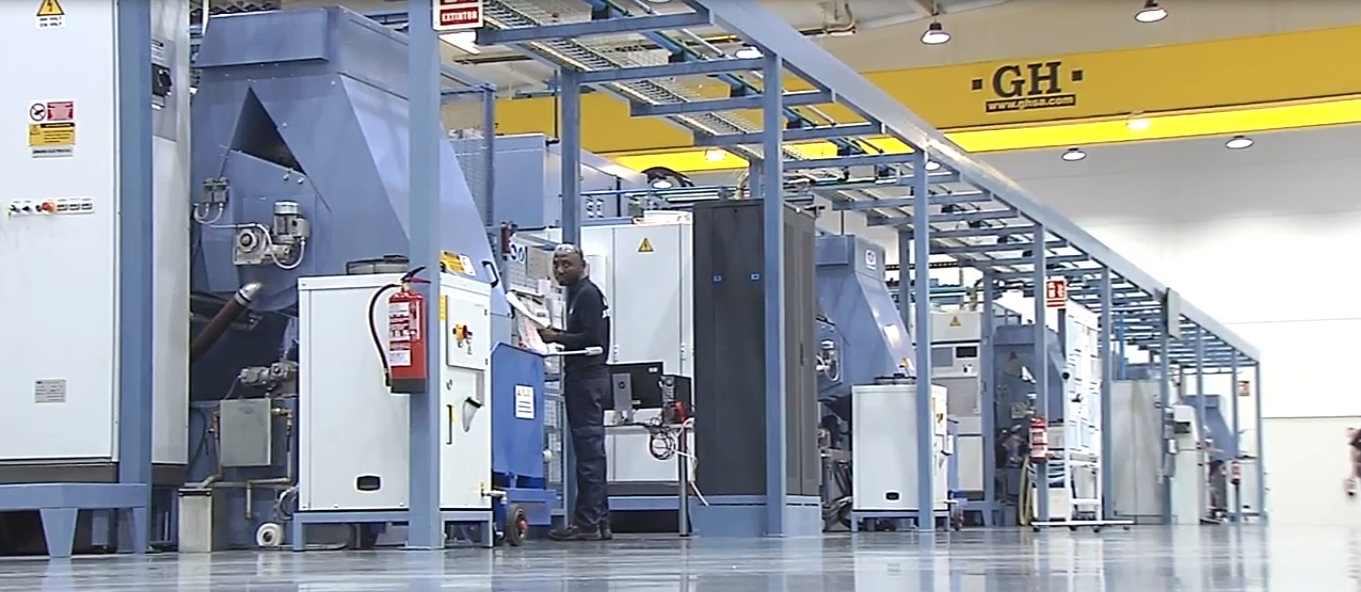
Aciturri Aeroengines plant in Miranda de Ebro

During 2000, the Castile and León industry occupied 18% of the active population and contributed 25% of GDP. The most developed industrial axis is that of Valladolid-Palencia-Burgos-Miranda de Ebro-Aranda de Duero, where there is an important car industry, paper industry, aeronautics and chemistry, and is where most of the industrial activity of the Castilian-Leonese territory is concentrated. The food industry derived from the farm and livestock, with flour, sunflower oil and wines, among others is also important, especially in the Ribera del Duero comarca, especially in Aranda de Duero.

The main industrial poles of the community are: Valladolid (21,054 workers dedicated to the sector), Burgos (20,217), Aranda de Duero (4,872), León (4,521), Ponferrada (4,270) and Ólvega (4,075).

Other industries are textiles in Béjar, roof tiles and bricks in Palencia, sugar in León, Valladolid, Toro, Miranda de Ebro and Benavente, the pharmaceutical company in León, Valladolid and mainly in Aranda de Duero with a factory of the GlaxoSmithKline group, the metallurgical and steel company in Ponferrada and the chemistry in Miranda de Ebro and Valladolid, the aeronautics in Miranda de Ebro and Valladolid. In the remaining capitals there is a food industry derived from the agricultural and livestock exploitation, with flour, sunflower oil and wines, among others. This regional agro-food industry is flagged by Calidad Pascual based in Aranda de Duero. In the agricultural industry, within the production of fertilizers, the Mirat, founded in 1812 in Salamanca, stands out.

In Soria the logging industry and furniture manufacturing is also relevant to the regional economy.

The president of the Castilian-Leonese employers' association is currently Ginés Clemente, owner of the Aciturri Aeronáutica, based in Miranda de Ebro. It is a leading international aeronautical group, with contracts with groups such as Boeing and Airbus, which makes Castile and León a benchmark in the sector.

Construction

The 16,34% of the companies in Castile and León belong to the auxiliary sector of construction. Among the largest companies in the sector, the following stand out: Grupo Pantersa, Begar, Grupo MRS, Isolux Corsán, Llorente Corporation, Volconsa and of auxiliary construction sector, Artepref of Gerardo de la Calle Group.

Mining

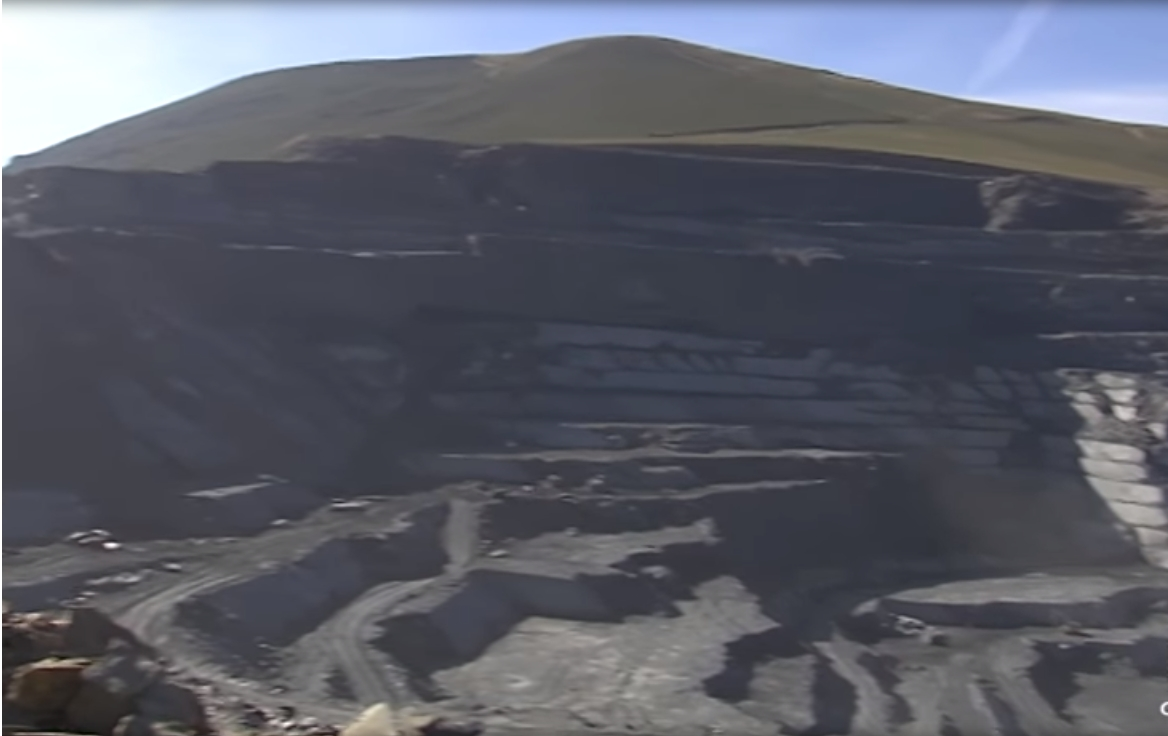
Open-cast slate quarry in the province of León.

In Castile and León, the mining activity acquired great importance in the Roman times, when a road was drawn, the Vía de la Plata, to transfer the gold extracted in the deposits of Las Médulas, in the Leonese comarca of El Bierzo, the route started from Asturica Augusta (Astorga) to Emerita Augusta (Mérida) and Hispalis (Seville).

Centuries later, after the Spanish Civil War, mining was one of the factors that contributed to the economic development of the region. However, the production of iron, tin and tungsten decreased notably from the 1970s, while bituminous coal and anthracite mines were maintained thanks to the domestic demand for coal for thermal power plants. The economic reconversion that affected the Leonese mining basin and Palencian mining basin during the 1980s and 1990s resulted in the closure of numerous mines, social impoverishment, with a sharp increase of unemployment and the beginning of a new migratory movement towards other Spanish regions. Despite the investments of the Mining Action Plan of the Junta de Castilla y León, traditional coal mining operations have entered into a severe crisis.

Energy sources

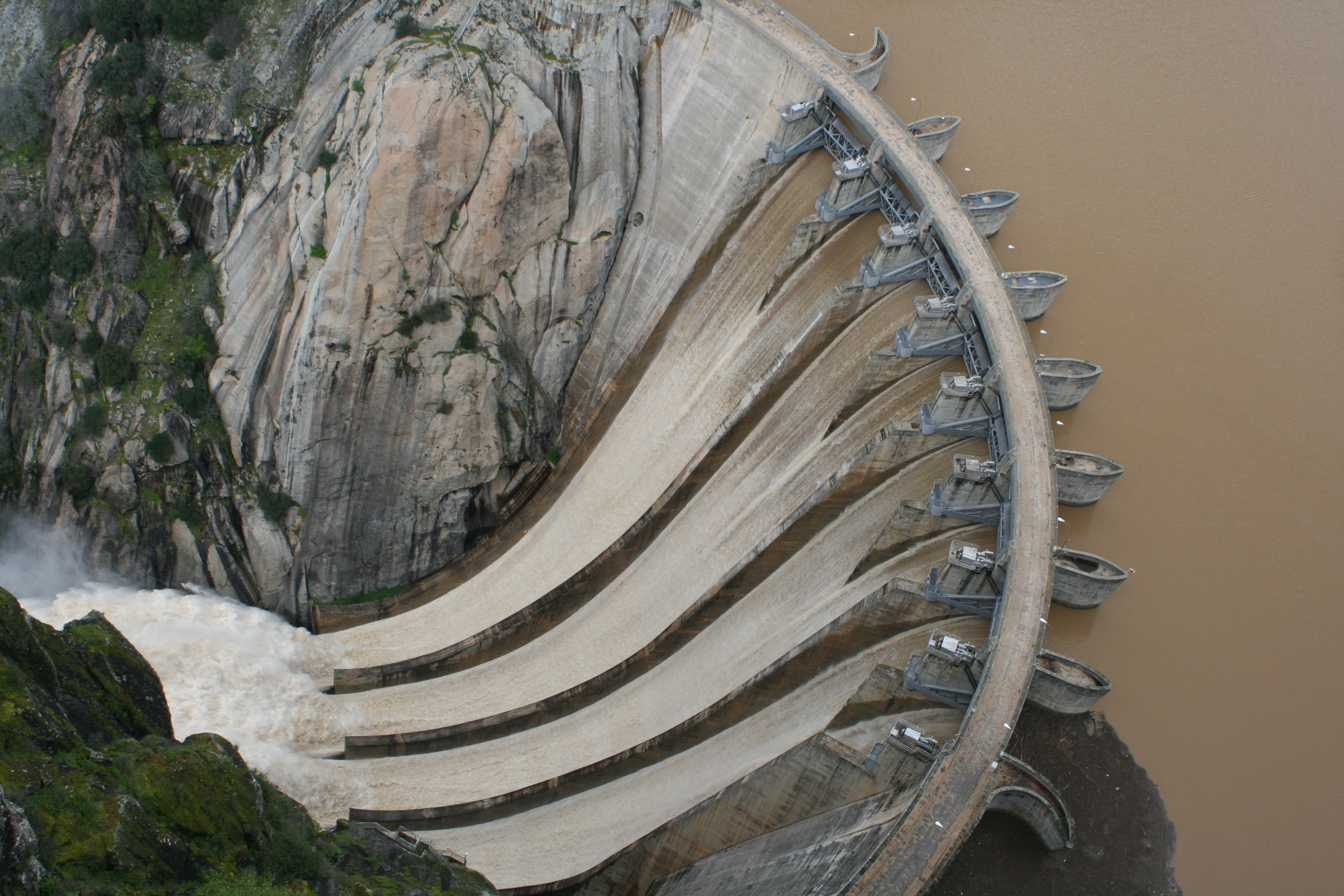
Aldeadávila Dam, which with 1,146 MW is the most powerful in the country.

Castile and León is a net producer of electric energy, with a generation/demand ratio in 2021 of 197% (27,016 GWh vs. 13,670 GWh).

In addition to the northern basin, in those of the Douro and Ebro rivers there are numerous hydroelectric plants that allow Castile and León to be one of the first autonomous communities producing electricity. Among others are those of Burguillo, Rioscuro, Las Ondinas, Cornatel, Bárcena, Aldeadávila I and II, Saucelle I and II, Castro I and II, Villalcampo I and II, Valparaíso and Ricobayo I and II.

The total installed hydraulic power amounts to 3,979 MW and annual production in 2010 was 5,739 GWH. Only in the system Saltos del Duero there are more than 3000 MW installed. In this way, Castile and León is the first Spanish autonomous community in installed capacity and the second in production.

The nuclear power is 466 MW, having produced 3,579.85 GWh in 2009. The only nuclear plant in Castile and León on 1 August 2017, was definitively and irrevocably closed.

The coal thermal produces around 16,956 GWh per year at the following plants:

Thermal power stations in Castile and León

Name	Location	Province	Owner
Thermal power station of Anllares	Páramo del Sil	Province of León	Gas Natural Fenosa and Endesa
Thermal power station of Compostilla II	Cubillos del Sil	Province of León	Endesa
Thermal power station of La Robla	La Robla	Province of León	Unión Fenosa
Velilla Power Plant	Velilla del Río Carrión	Province of Palencia	Iberdrola

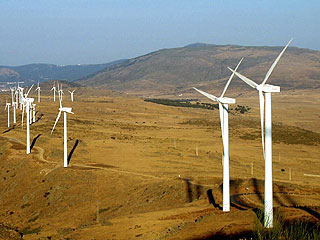
Wind farm in the province of Ávila.

The region stands out for the importance of the production of renewable energy. Castile and León is the community that covers the largest proportion of its electricity demand through renewable energies: 82,9% in 2009. Traditional hydroelectric power It has been added with force since the late 1990s and 2000 wind power, with more than 100 parks in operation and a production of 5,449 GWh in that same year. By provinces, it is at the top Burgos with 46, and a total of 3,128 MW of installed power.

Among the non-renewable energies is also the natural gas (194 MW of installed power) and fuel-diesel fuel (69 MW).

The provinces of Valladolid and Burgos are the most economically advanced regions, with a GDP per capita higher than the national average. Even so, the average GDP per capita of the community of Castile and León is slightly below than average, at 21,244 euros per inhabitant.

=== Tertiary sector ===
==== Tourism ====
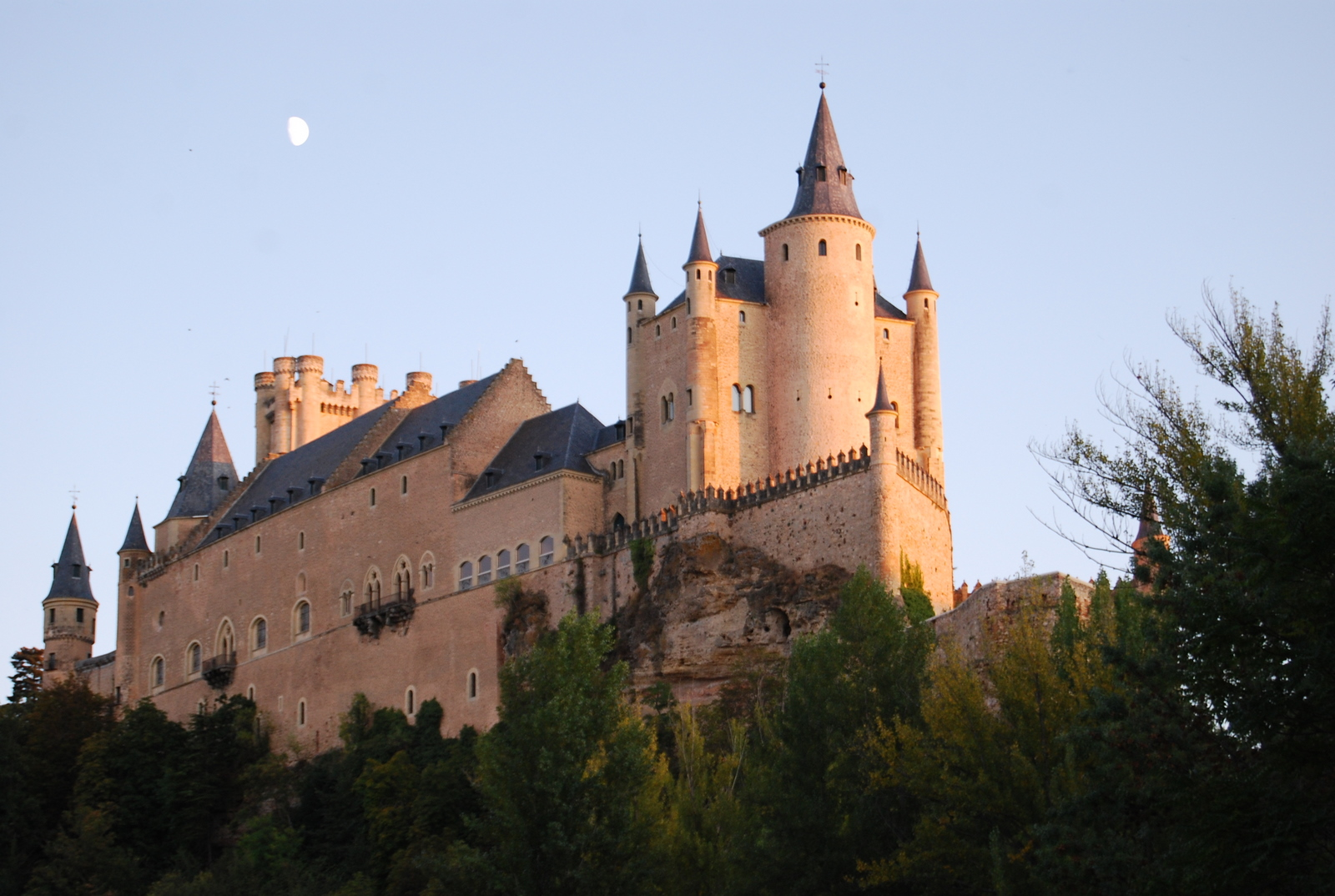
Segovia is one of the main tourist destinations in the region; it, Salamanca and Ávila, are world heritage cities.

Some of its tourism highlights include the walls of Ávila, and the cathedrals of Burgos and Leon.

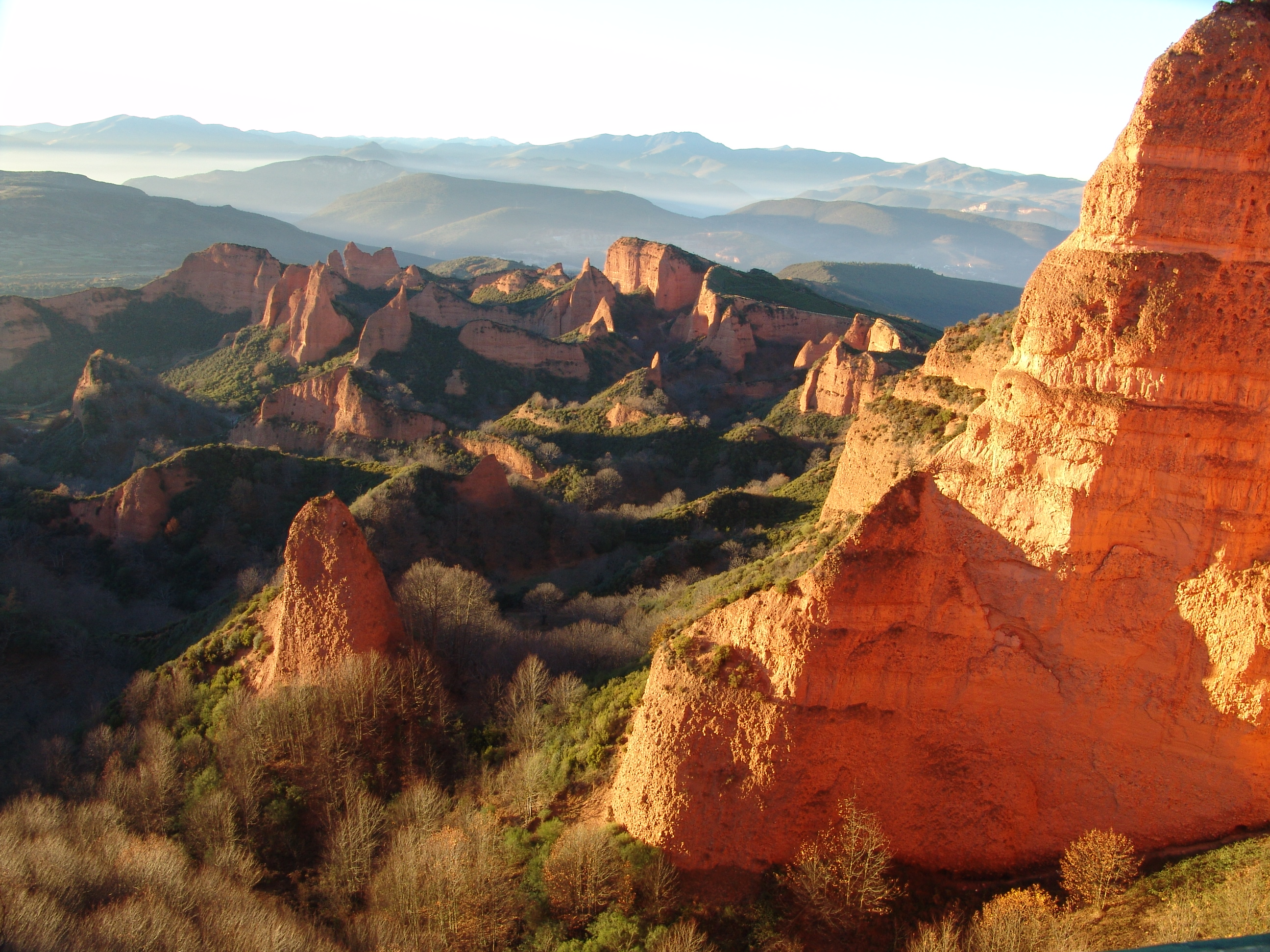
Las Médulas is a world heritage site, with a landscape that reveals Roman mining techniques in what it was a gold-rich area in Antiquity.

Castile and León has several cities whose Holy Week is considered to be of International Tourist Interest. Examples are Holy Week in León, Holy Week in Salamanca, Holy Week in Valladolid or Holy Week in Zamora.

The region also has a wide network of Paradores, hotels of great quality that usually accommodate buildings of great historical value in privileged places to stimulate tourism in the area.

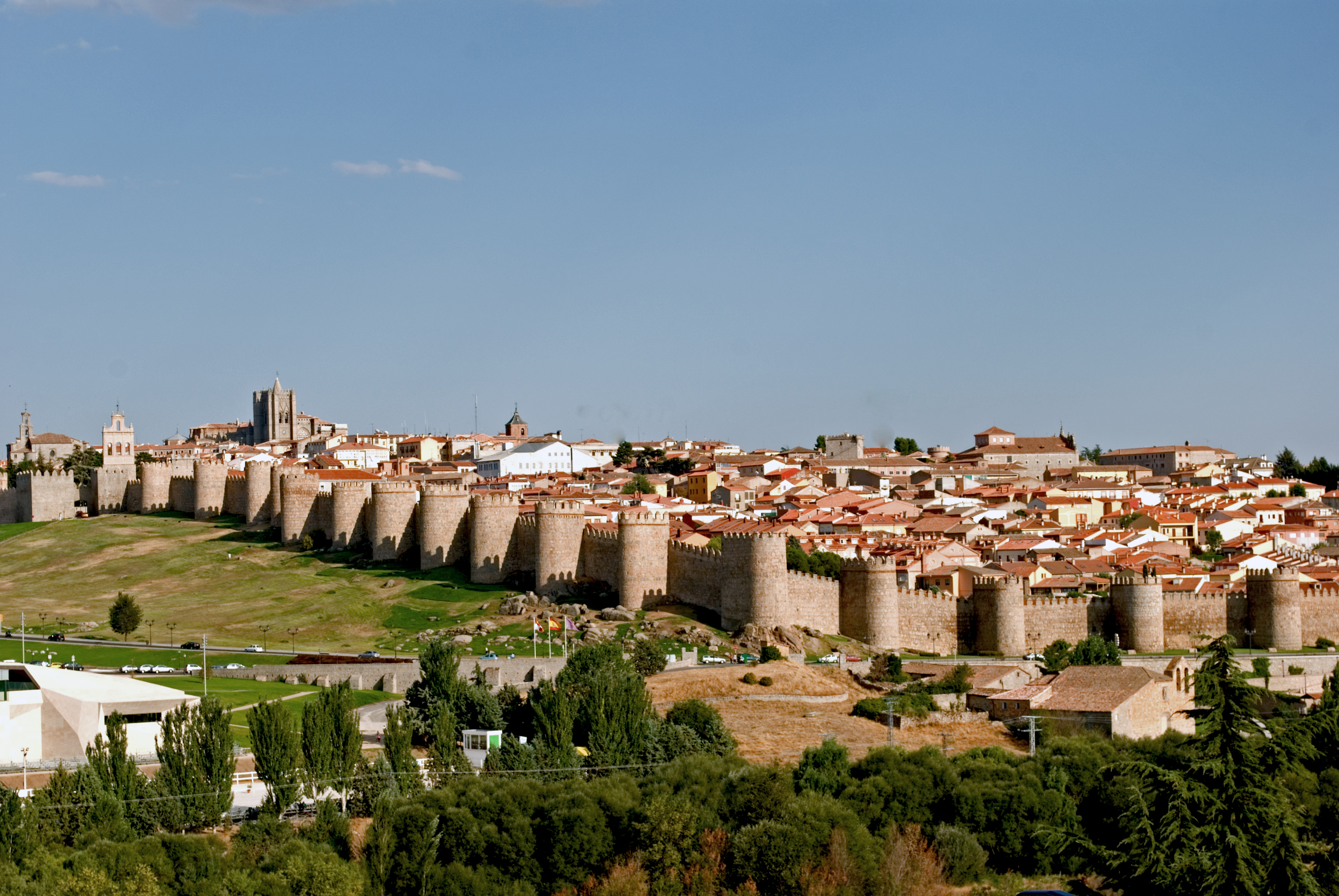
The city of Ávila is one of the places in Castile and León declared a World Heritage Site by UNESCO.

Since 1988, the foundation Las Edades del Hombre has been organizing various exhibitions of religious art in various parts of the national and international geography, highlighting for its interest the exhibitions held in Castile and León. The idea of carrying out these exhibitions was conceived in a chimney of Alcazarén with the writer José Jiménez Lozano and the priest of Valladolid José Velicia. The first "Las Edades del Hombre" were held in the Church of Santiago Apóstol of Alcazarén, with a small exhibition of sacred paintings. Later, and with the support of important personalities, the first known exhibition was held among the public, which was that of Valladolid. In 2012 the initiative was developed under the name of Monacatus in the town of Oña, being one of the most multitudinous editions with about 200 000 visitors. The last sample so far has taken place in the municipality of Arévalo, in 2013. With the title of Credo, the exhibition has revolved around the faith and has received more than 226 000 visitors.

=== Domestic trade and exports abroad ===
The internal trade of Castile and León is concentrated in the sector of food, automotive, fabric and footwear. For foreign trade, according to the region, vehicles and car chassis are mainly exported in Province of Ávila, Province of Palencia and Province of Valladolid, tires in Province of Burgos and Province of Valladolid, steel bars and slate manufactures in León, beef in Province of Salamanca, pigs in Province of Segovia, rubber manufactures in Province of Soria and goat and sheep meat, together with wine, in Province of Zamora.

Castile and León also exports a lot of wine, being Province of Valladolid the one that more bottles sells abroad. As regards imports, vehicles and their accessories, such as engines or tires, are in the lead. The region also imports mainly products from France, Italy, United Kingdom, Germany, Portugal and the United States and exports mostly to the countries of the European Union and to Turkey, Israel and the United States.

== Education ==
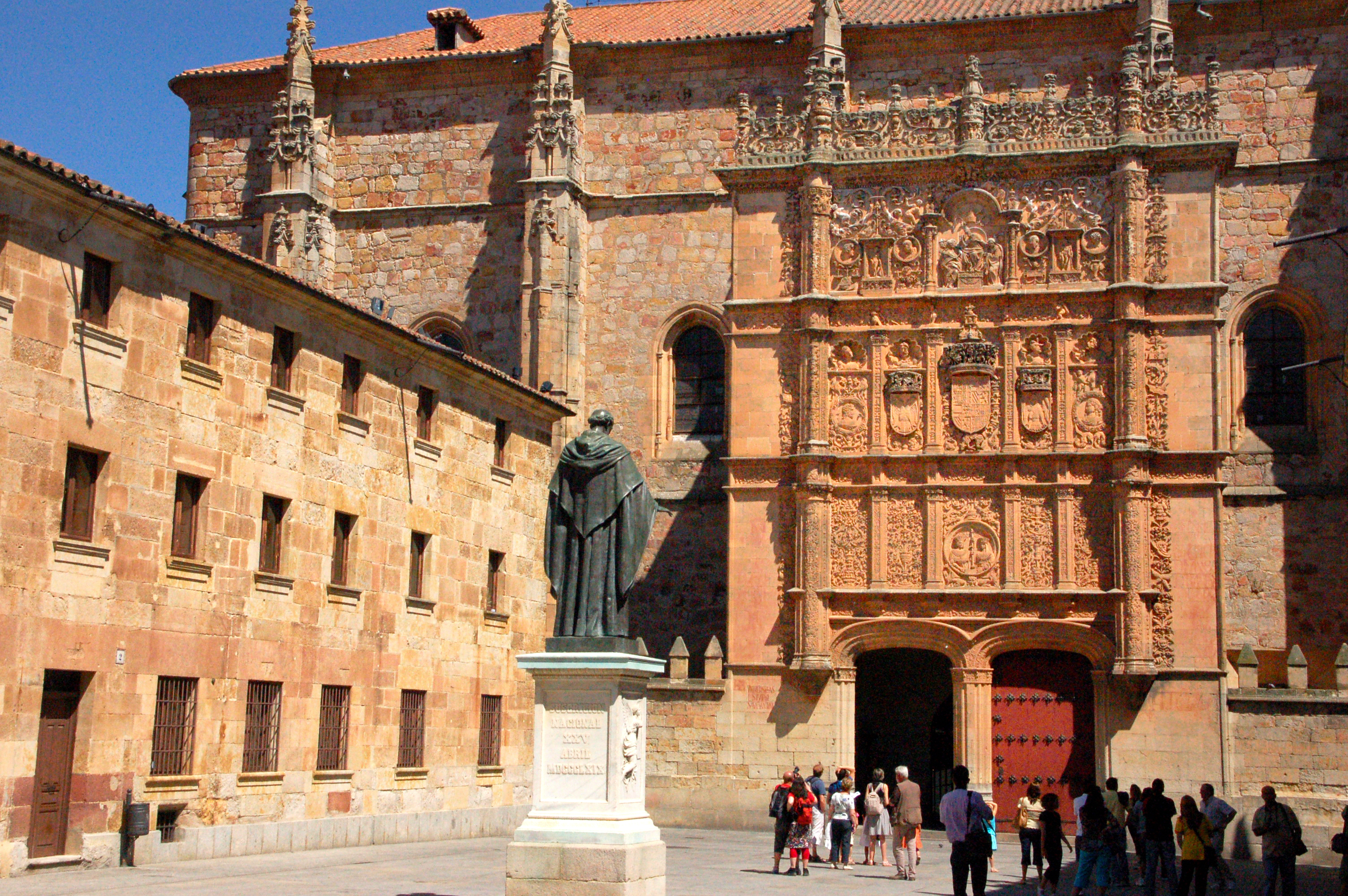
Façade of the University of Salamanca in which Francisco de Vitoria created the School of Salamanca and international law

=== Public Universities ===
- University of Burgos
- University of León
- University of Salamanca
- University of Valladolid
- National University of Distance Education

=== Private Universities ===
- Catholic University of Ávila (Universidad Católica Santa Teresa de Jesús de Ávila)
- Miguel de Cervantes European University (Valladolid)
- IE University (Instituto de Empresa Universidad, Segovia)
- Pontifical University of Salamanca

== Transport ==
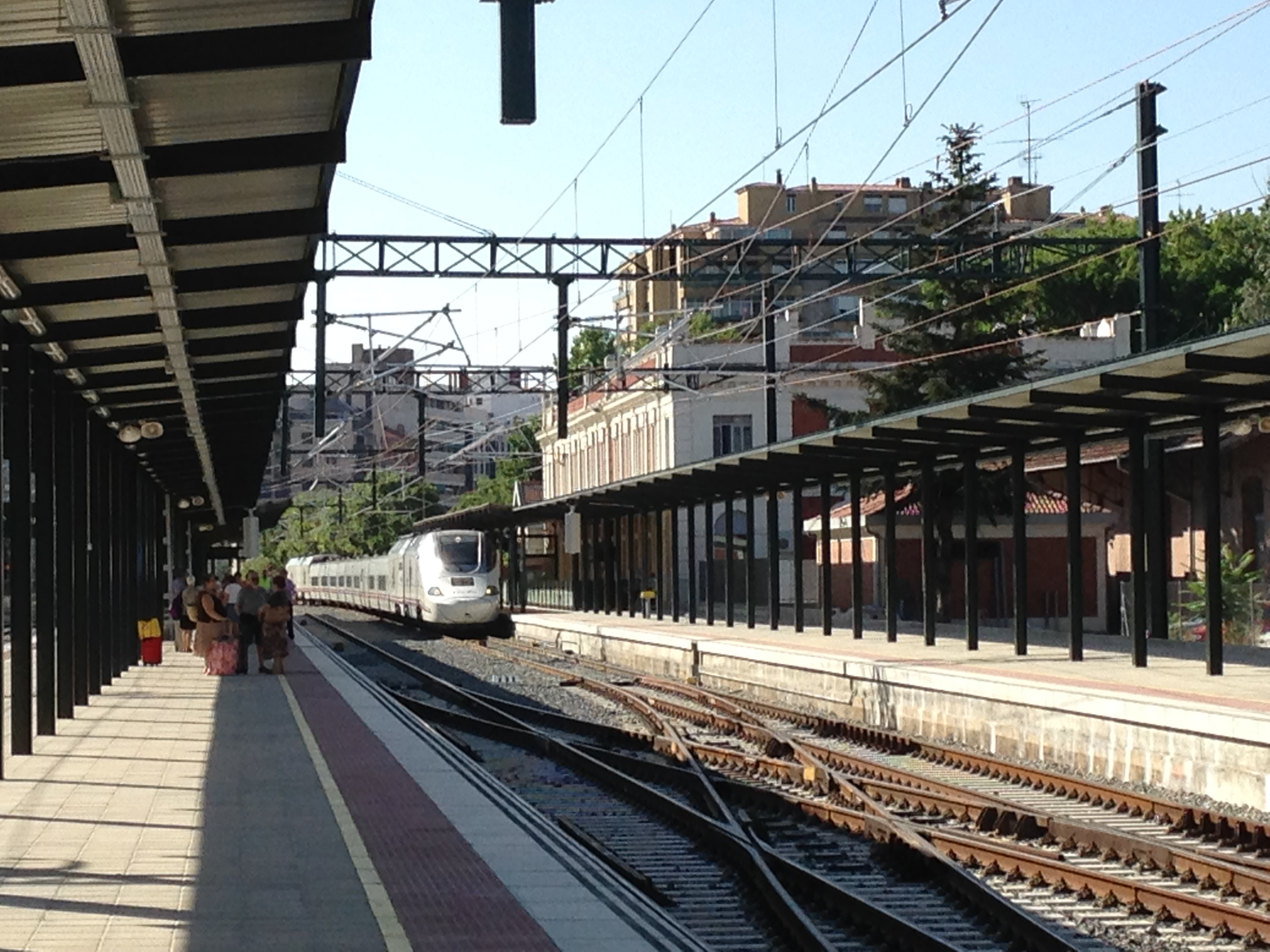
High-speed train in Palencia railway station

=== Rail ===
Castilla y León has an extensive rail network, including the principal lines from Madrid to Cantabria and Galicia as well as the León-Bilbao line across its north, making Europe's longest narrow-gauge line. The line from Paris to Lisbon crosses the region, reaching the Portuguese frontier at Fuentes de Oñoro in Salamanca. Astorga, Burgos, León, Miranda de Ebro, Palencia, Ponferrada, Medina del Campo and Valladolid are all important railway junctions.

Railways operate in several different gauges: Iberian gauge (1,668 mm (5 ft 5 21/32 in)), UIC gauge (1,435 mm (4 ft 8 1/2 in)) and narrow-gauge (1,000 mm (3 ft 3 3/8 in)). Except for the Ponferrada - Villablino line, Ferrocarril MSP under the Junta of Castile and León, trains are operated by Renfe on lines maintained by the Administrador de Infraestructuras Ferroviarias (ADIF); both of these are national, state-owned companies.

=== Roads ===
The region is also crossed by two major ancient routes:

- The Way of St. James, mentioned above as a World Heritage Site, now a hiking trail and a motorway, from east to west.
- The Roman Via de la Plata ("Silver Way"), mentioned above in the context of mining, now a main road through the west of the region.

The road network is regulated by the Ley de carreteras 10/2008 de Castilla y León (Highway Law 10/2008 of Castile and León).

=== Air ===
The region has 4 airports:

- Burgos Airport
- León Airport
- Salamanca Airport
- Valladolid Airport

However, others airports such as Asturias Airport, Bilbao Airport, Santiago–Rosalía de Castro Airport, Vigo Airport, Zaragoza Airport and Madrid–Barajas Airport are also used by air travellers from the region.

== See also ==
- Castilian-Leonese cuisine
- List of oldest church buildings
