= UIL Holdings Corporation =

Former energy company in the United States

- Industry: Holding Company
- Founded: 1971
- Fate: Merged with Avangrid
- Headquarters: Orange, Connecticut, United States
- Key people: James P. Torgerson (CEO) Anthony Vallillo - COO Linda Randell - Chief Legal Counsel Diane Pivirotto - VP of Human Resources Joseph Santamaria - CIO Rich Nicholas - CFO Robert Allessio - President Gas Companies
- Website: www.uil.com

UIL Holdings Corporation was a diversified energy delivery company serving a total of 690,000 electric and natural gas utility customers in 66 communities across two states, with combined total assets of over $4 billion. In 2015 it merged with Iberdrola USA to form Avangrid.

UIL is the parent company for The United Illuminating Company (UI), Connecticut Natural Gas Corporation (CNG), The Southern Connecticut Gas Company (SCG), and The Berkshire Gas Company (BGC), each more than 100 years old. UI provides for the transmission and delivery of electricity and other energy related services for Connecticut's Greater New Haven and Bridgeport areas. SCG and CNG are natural gas distribution companies that serve customers in Connecticut, while Berkshire Gas serves natural gas customers in western Massachusetts. UIL employs more than 1,850 people in the New England region.

== History ==
UIL Holdings Corporation was formed in 2000, after the state of Connecticut embraced deregulation, as the holding corporation for the regulated electric utility UI and United Resources Inc. (URI). At that time, URI was the umbrella for UIL Holdings' non-regulated business units. By 2006, UIL had divested its non-utility businesses and turned its focus back to its core business.

In May 2010, UIL and Iberdrola USA Inc., a wholly owned subsidiary of Iberdrola S.A., announced a definitive agreement under which UIL would acquire SCG, CNG and BGC. In November 2010, the Connecticut Department of Public Utility Control approved the change of control of the Connecticut gas companies to UIL and the acquisition was finalized on 16 November 2010. The Massachusetts Department of Public Utilities determined its approval was not required with respect to the acquisition of BGC.

Along with UIL's existing electric utility, UI, the acquisition of the three natural gas companies created an energy delivery company that serves approximately 690,000 utility customers in 66 communities across two states. As a result of the deal, UIL's total number of employees has grown to approximately 1,858.

Iberdrola USA is now known as Avangrid. The name change was made in conjunction with the company's merger with UIL Holdings. The combined entity's stock is now traded on the New York Stock Exchange under the ticker symbol "AGR." Iberdrola will adopt the Avangrid name when the merger deal closed. Utility regulators in Connecticut and Massachusetts are expected to approve Iberdrola's acquisition of UIL Holdings. Iberdrola USA's NYSEG and Rochester Gas and Electric units serve customers in upstate New York. After the merger with UIL, the company will have about 3.1 million customers in New York and New England. Iberdrola USA is owned by Iberdrola SA of Spain.
