= CNG (disambiguation) =

CNG, or compressed natural gas, is fuel gas mainly composed of methane.

CNG or cng may also refer to:

- Connecticut Natural Gas, an American natural gas distribution company
- Certified Naturally Grown, a nonprofit farm assurance certification program
- Cryptography API: Next Generation, an update of Microsoft CryptoAPI introduced in Windows Vista
- Cyclic nucleotide–gated ion channel, ion channels that function in response to the binding of cyclic nucleotides
- National Council of Government (Haiti), the provisional government of Haiti from 1986 to 1988, natively Conseil National de Gouvernement
- Colegio Nueva Granada, a private international school in Bogotá, Colombia
- Northern Qiang language (ISO 639-3 code: cng)
- Chinese Garden MRT station (MRT code: CNG)

== See also ==
- Auto rickshaw, sometimes referred to in Bangladesh as CNG
