= Linda Ball =

American business executive

Linda Ball is an American business executive. Ball is the president and CEO of Central Maine Power (CMP), the state's largest utility provider. She was previously the company's vice president of customer service.

== Career ==
Ball began working in utilities as an entry-level customer service representative at New York State Electric and Gas, one of CMP's sister companies, where she answered phone calls. In 2012, Ball joined CMP and relocated to Maine. She worked in the process and technologies business area for CMP's parent company, Avangrid.

From 2019 to 2025, Ball was CMP's vice president of customer service. In that role, Ball helped expand the utility's customer service teams and led storm recovery efforts.

In September 2025, Ball became president and CEO of CMP, succeeding Joe Purington. In October 2025, she defended CMP's proposed rate increase tied to a five-year workforce and grid investment plan. Ball said, "If we don't act now, everyone is going to pay more later."

In April 2026, Ball spoke at CMP's first-ever "Resiliency Summit," focusing on long‑term grid planning, investment strategies, and system resiliency.
