= José Ignacio Sánchez Galán =

Spanish businessman

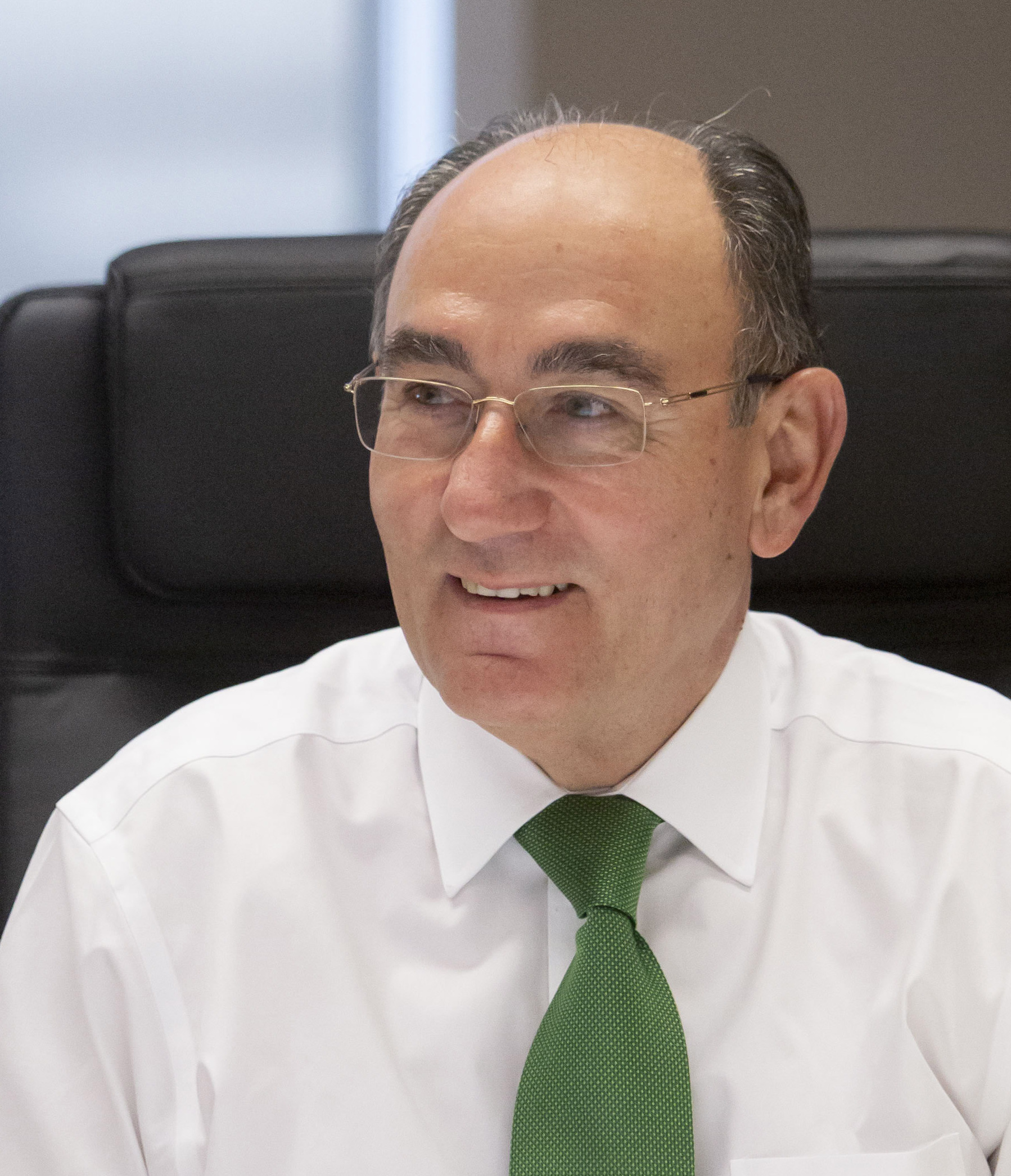
Ignacio Galán in 2020

José Ignacio Sánchez Galán (born 1950) is a Spanish businessman who currently serves as executive chairman of Iberdrola, a multinational energy company.

== Career ==
=== Early career ===
Galán's career got under way in 1972 at Sociedad Española del Acumulador Tudor, where he held various executive posts and oversaw the company's international expansion.

Galán was chairman of Eurojet.

=== Career at Iberdrola ===
In 2001, Galán was appointed the executive vice-chairman and chief executive of Iberdrola and in 2006 he earned the position of executive chairman at the company.^{3}

In 2007 he was appointed Scottish Power Chairman.

Since 2015 he is also Avangrid Chairman.

In 2023, he joined the Global Leaders Council of the UNICEF Generation Unlimited organization.

In 2025, Galán was included in the inaugural group of the Leaders for Growth and Competitiveness in Europe initiative, promoted by the World Economic Forum.

== Controversies ==
In 2022, he testified privately in Spain's High Court for an investigation involving "alleged bribery, breach of privacy and fraud in commercial documents." The allegations under investigation covered a time period between 2004 and 2017, alleged that Iberdrola "paid Cenyt, a private security company operated by [José Manuel] Villarejo, to spy on energy companies and their executives on multiple occasions, either to create negative press or to bribe or influence officials." Alleged activities also included spying on Real Madrid's president Florentino Pérez "when Perez's construction company ACS was fighting for a seat on Iberdrola's board in 2009," trying to eliminate local environmental opposition to the construction of a power plant in Southern Spain, and harassment of a former chairman of a competing Spanish utility. Iberdrola has accused former employee José Antonio Olmo of unlawful appropriation of business documentation and disclosure of company secrets.

== Other activities ==
=== Corporate boards ===
- JPMorgan Chase, Member of the International Council (since 2018)

=== Non-profit organizations ===
- World Economic Forum (WEF), Chair of the Electricity Cluster
- Elcano Royal Institute for International and Strategic Studies, Member of the Board of Trustees
- European Round Table for Industry (ERT), Member of the Board and Steering Committee
- Renewable Hydrogen Coalition (RHC), chairman since 2021

He has chaired the electric utilities group at the World Economic Forum (Davos), of which he is a member. Galán is also a member of the European Round Table of Industrialists (ERT) and the group representing Europe's leading electric companies.

== Recognition ==
Galán is a member of GlobalScot, an international Scottish government network of the business leaders who are most keenly committed to the economic development of Scotland.

Galán is a visiting lecturer at the University of Strathclyde in Glasgow and has also given lectures at the Industrial Engineering College attached to Comillas Pontifical University in Madrid. In 2012, he was appointed chairman of the Social Council of the University of Salamanca.

Throughout his career he has received numerous recognitions, including the following: One of the 100 CEOs included in the Brand Finance Brand Guardianship Index 2021; selected between the best five CEO of the world on the Harvard Business Review Ranking; recognized as one of the 10's more influential CEO in the fight against climate change, according to Bloomberg; best chief executive officer (CEO) within the utilities category (for the eleventh time) according to the Institutional Investor Research Group 201; and best CEO of European utilities and Spanish listed companies in investors relations, according to the Thomson Extel Survey 2011.

In 2008, he was crowned "Business Leader of the Year" by the Spain-U.S. Chamber of Commerce^{8} and that same year he also received the "International Economy Award" from the Cristóbal Gabarrón Foundation.^{9} José Ignacio Galán has also been named Council of Bilbao by the Bilbao Chamber of Commerce and obtained the 2009 Gold Medal from the province of Salamanca.^{10}

In 2011, he was handed the Lagun Onari award by the Basque Government, which is given to prominent non-Basque individuals in recognition of their efforts to promote Basque history and culture and improve the region's economy.^{11}

In 2014, he received the FIRST Award for Responsible Capitalism and that very same year, Elizabeth II of the United Kingdom bestowed on him the honorary title of Commander of the Order of the British Empire.^{12} That same year he was awarded the honorary decoration of Commander of the Most Excellent Order of the British Empire (Civil Division) for his work on behalf of the British energy sector and UK-Spain trade and investment relations.

In 2016, Galán received his tenth Best Chief Executive Officer award in European electric utilities, which is issued by the Institutional Investor Research Group.^{13} ^{14}

In 2017, the Institutional Investor Research Group named him, for the eleventh time, Best Chief Executive of European electric utilities. In 2011 he was named best CEO of European utilities and Spanish listed companies in investor relations, according to the Thomson Extel Survey.

In 2018, he was named Honorary Member of the Spanish Institute of Engineering in recognition of "a long and successful life dedicated to engineering" and "his skills, abilities and value as an engineer".

In 2019 was designated as a Universal Spaniard by the Independent Foundation. This award honours the career of Ignacio Galán, an engineer and prominent manager who has been leading companies in industrial and technological sectors (such as telecommunications, aeronautics and energy) in which he has profoundly changed their profile, reflecting his vision of the future and his ability to anticipate the new needs of society.

In 2019 he also received the National Innovation and Design Award 2019, in the category of Innovative Career, awarded by the Ministry of Science, Innovation and Universities, the León Award from El Español for Best Business Management 2019, was selected among the five best CEOs in the world in the 2019 Harvard Business Review ranking and was recognised as one of the 10 most influential CEOs in the world in the fight against climate change, according to Bloomberg.

That same year he was also recognised among the top five CEOs in the world in the Harvard Business Review's 2019 annual ranking.

In 2020 he won the Alfonso de Salas Award for Economic Personality of the Year, awarded by the newspaper elEconomista, the Management Leadership Award by the Spanish Association for Quality (AEC), the Honour Award of the VII Awards for the Best Executive of Castilla y León, organised by Castilla y León Económica, the Forinvest 2020 Award for professional career21 and the National Innovation and Design Award for Innovative Career, awarded by the Ministry of Science, Innovation and Universities.

In 2023, Ignacio Galán has been awarded the inaugural Foreign Policy Association's ESG Leadership Award during their annual dinner at New York's Harvard Club. The award recognizes business leaders who have shown a strong commitment to incorporating ESG (Environmental, Social, and Governance) principles into their business strategies. Governor George Pataki, New York's former governor, presented the award, commending Galán's visionary approach and social responsibility in leading Iberdrola's growth and advancements in renewable energy. Galán highlighted Iberdrola's ongoing commitment to ESG principles, emphasizing the compatibility of decarbonization and value creation. The event also honored General Mark Milley, the Chairman of the Joint Chiefs of Staff, and Joaquin Duato, Chairman & CEO of Johnson & Johnson, for their notable contributions. Galan also received the Business Leadership in Energy Transition 2023 Award from the Energy Newspaper.

In 2023 Ignacio Galán has been included by Time into the first TIME100 Climate list, recognizing the 100 most innovative leaders driving business climate action.

In June 2025, Ignacio Galán received the Business Person of the Year award from UPF – Barcelona School of Management, in recognition of his business career and his leadership in the energy transformation process.

In October 2025, Galán was recognized as the Best Chief Executive of the European utilities sector at the Extel Europe & Emerging EMEA Equities Awards, honors that acknowledge excellence in management and investor relations within the European business sphere.

In October 2025, Mr. Galan also received in Qatar the Al-Attiya International Energy Award, recognising his Lifetime Achievement in Renewable Energy.
