= Burceña Power Plant =

Decommissioned power station in Spain

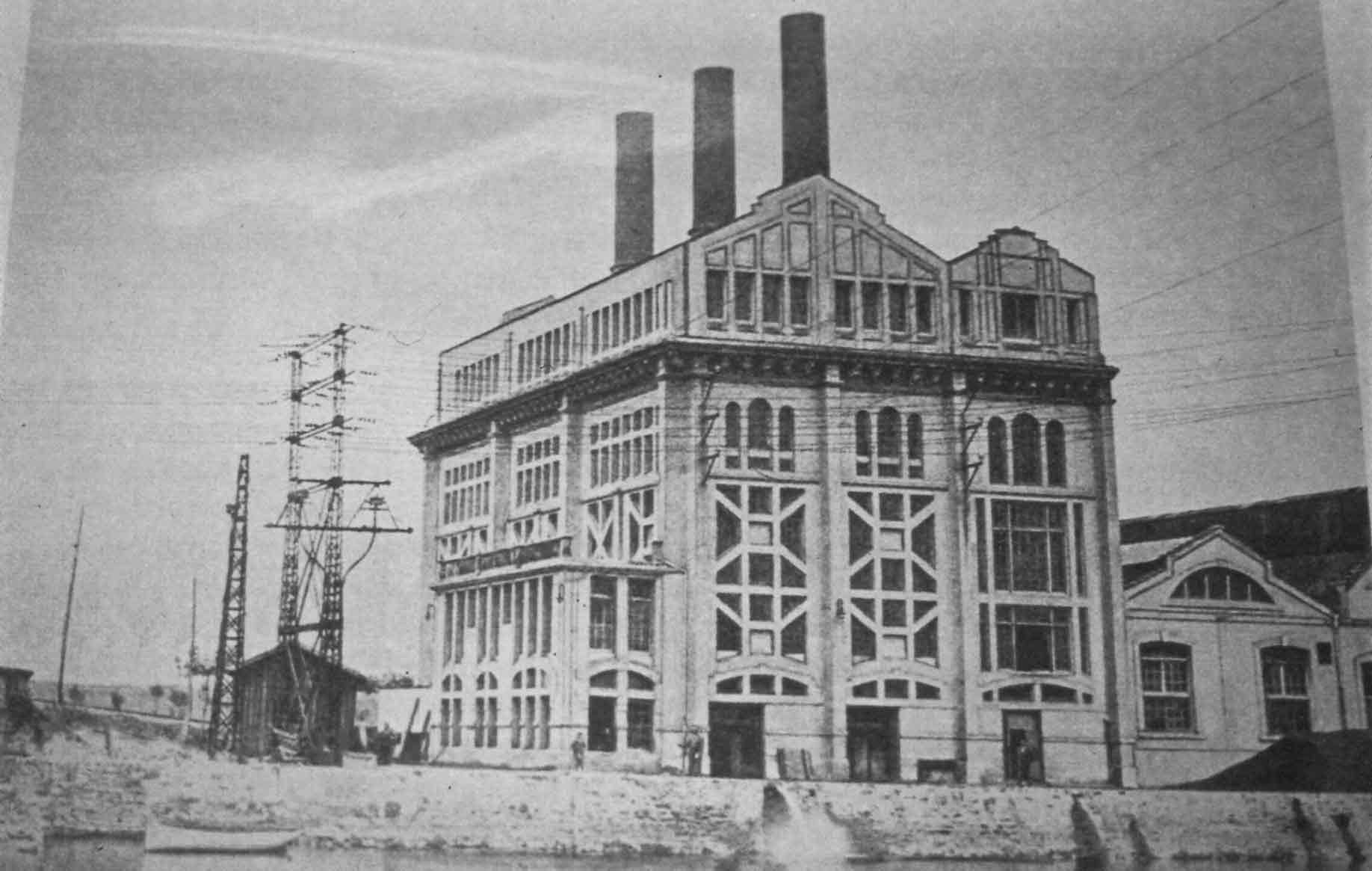
- The original coal-fired plant, inaugurated in 1907. In the foreground, the Cadagua river can be seen.
- Country: Spain
- Location: Barakaldo, Biscay
- Coordinates: 43°16′56″N 2°58′31″E
- Status: Decommissioned
- Commission date: 1907/1948/1965
- Decommission date: 1985
- Owners: Hidroeléctrica Ibérica (1907); Iberduero (1944); Iberdrola (1992)

Thermal power station
- Primary fuel: Coal
- Secondary fuel: Fuel oil
- Combined cycle?: No

Power generation
- Nameplate capacity: 92 MW

The Burceña Power Plant was a power plant located in the district of Burceña in the Biscayan town of Barakaldo (Spain). It was built by Hidroeléctrica Ibérica, which brought its first coal-fired unit into service in 1907. From 1948 onward, Iberduero carried out its expansion in successive phases, the most important of which were the new units brought into operation in 1957 and 1965, which ran on fuel oil. It ceased operation in 1985, and in 2004 Iberdrola began its demolition.

== History ==
=== Construction ===
At the beginning of the 20th century, electricity generation in Spain was dominated by hydroelectric production. In 1901, Hidroeléctrica Ibérica was founded in Bilbao under the engineer Juan de Urrutia Zulueta, and it soon became one of the most important companies in the sector. The company operated several hydroelectric plants in northern Spain, and in its early years expanded its reach to also supply Valencia and Madrid.

To meet growing energy demand, in 1907 HI brought the Burceña power plant into service, in the district of the same name in Barakaldo. It was located next to the Cadagua river near its confluence with the Bilbao estuary and the Pablo Alzola Bridge, and it was coal-fired, making it the first large thermal power plant in the Basque Country. It had three turbines and an installed capacity of 10,000 kVA, and technology from the German company AEG. The main building housed eight boilers built by Babcock & Wilcox in Sestao, each with 340 m² of heating surface, fitted with mechanical stokers, superheaters, economisers, and a bucket-type coal elevator. The project involved the participation of the Bilbao Tramways and Electricity Company, which was one of the main users of its output. The station had its own docks and coal-unloading systems on the Cadagua river, where barges carrying the coal arrived via the estuary.

In 1927, Hidroeléctrica Ibérica remained as the sole owner and carried out the first expansion, installing three new boilers and a Brown Boveri turbine in a new building, under a design by Federico de Ugalde. During the Spanish Civil War, the power plant was one of the sites protected by the defenders of the city and the Iron Ring to prevent it from being attacked, and it remained active for the eleven months the conflict lasted in the area, except when coal ran short. According to Paul Preston, General Emilio Mola had planned the destruction of the Burceña power plant and other industries around Bilbao in order to overcome Republican resistance.

=== Consolidation and transfer to Iberduero ===
In 1944, Hidroeléctrica Ibérica merged with Saltos del Duero to form Iberduero, which took over the assets of both companies, including the Burceña power plant. Iberduero carried out a first expansion in 1948, raising output to 26,000 kW, fuelled by coal and fuel oil, and in 1954 undertook the construction of a new unit —Burceña II— under a design by Ángel Galíndez Celayeta, with the architect Francisco Hurtado de Saracho in charge. A new building was constructed with two L-shaped bays to house the 1927 expansion and the three new boilers, and the old ones were demolished. The new plant was brought into service in 1957, with a capacity of 66 MW, raising its output to 92,000 kW.

In the 1960s, Iberduero undertook a program to build large thermal power plants, which included the Pasajes, Santurce, and Velilla power plants, as well as the addition of another unit at Burceña in 1965, named Burceña III. This new unit was installed by General Electric in a new building attached to the previous one. The young Bilbao-born engineer José María Ryan joined this new installation; he was murdered by ETA in 1981 while he was in charge of the Lemoiz Nuclear Power Plant.

=== Closure and dismantling ===
External images
- Burceña Power Station
- Aerial view of the plant in the 1970s. The Cadagua river can be seen, with its mouth into the Nervión above.
- View from the Cadagua. A coal-transport ship and the conveyor belt system can be seen.

The power plant reached the end of its service life and ceased operation in 1985, and in February 2002 Iberdrola applied for permission to dismantle the facilities, which was granted in October of that year. Dismantling work began in 2004, and a business park was planned for the site. In 2021, the company planned to build an electrical substation on its former site, which met with strong local opposition.

== Bibliography ==
- García Adán, Juan Carlos; Diego Martín, Yolanda (2005). El archivo histórico de Iberdrola y la industria eléctrica en España: fondos para la investigación histórica [The Iberdrola historical archive and the electricity industry in Spain: collections for historical research] (PDF) (in Spanish). Santiago de Compostela: Congreso de Historia Económica.
- Sánchez Molina, Adrián (2014). España sin luz ¿un delito de Estado? [Spain Without Electricity: A Crime of State?] (PDF) (in Spanish). ISBN 8490764824.
