= Pedro Azagra Blázquez =

Spanish businessman

- Born: 1968 (age 57–58); Madrid, Spain
- Education: Business Administration and Management and MBA in Chicago University, in Illinois, United States
- Alma mater: Comillas Pontifical University
- Occupation: chief executive officer (CEO) of Iberdrola

Pedro Azagra Blázquez (Madrid, 1968) is the current chief executive officer (CEO) of the Iberdrola Group, a position he has held since June 24, 2025.

== Biography ==
He holds a degree in Business Administration and Management from Universidad Pontificia Comillas - ICADE (Madrid), and an MBA (Master of Business Administration) from the University of Chicago (Graduate School of Business).

== Professional career ==
Pedro Azagra joined the Iberdrola Group in 1997 as Strategy Director.

After his role as Strategy Director at Iberdrola Group, he relocated to London, where he served as Chief Development Officer until 2022. As head of mergers and acquisitions at the Iberdrola Group, he led the company's international expansion through deals such as the acquisition of ScottishPower and Energy East.

In June 2022, he was appointed CEO of the subholding company Avangrid, Inc.

Previously, he had already been responsible for Iberdrola Group's business operations in the United States, and served as a board member of several listed companies, including Siemens Gamesa Renewable Energy, S.A. and Neoenergia, S.A.

Pedro Azagra has represented Spanish business interests in the United States, participating in international events such as those organized by the Spain-U.S. Chamber of Commerce in New York. He was also a member of the Board of Directors and Executive Committee of the Edison Electric Institute (EEI) in the United States, and on the board of Yale New Haven Hospital in Connecticut.

Since June 2025, Pedro Azagra has been CEO of Iberdrola Group.
