= New York State Electric & Gas =

Electric and gas utility company in New York, USA

New York State Electric and Gas
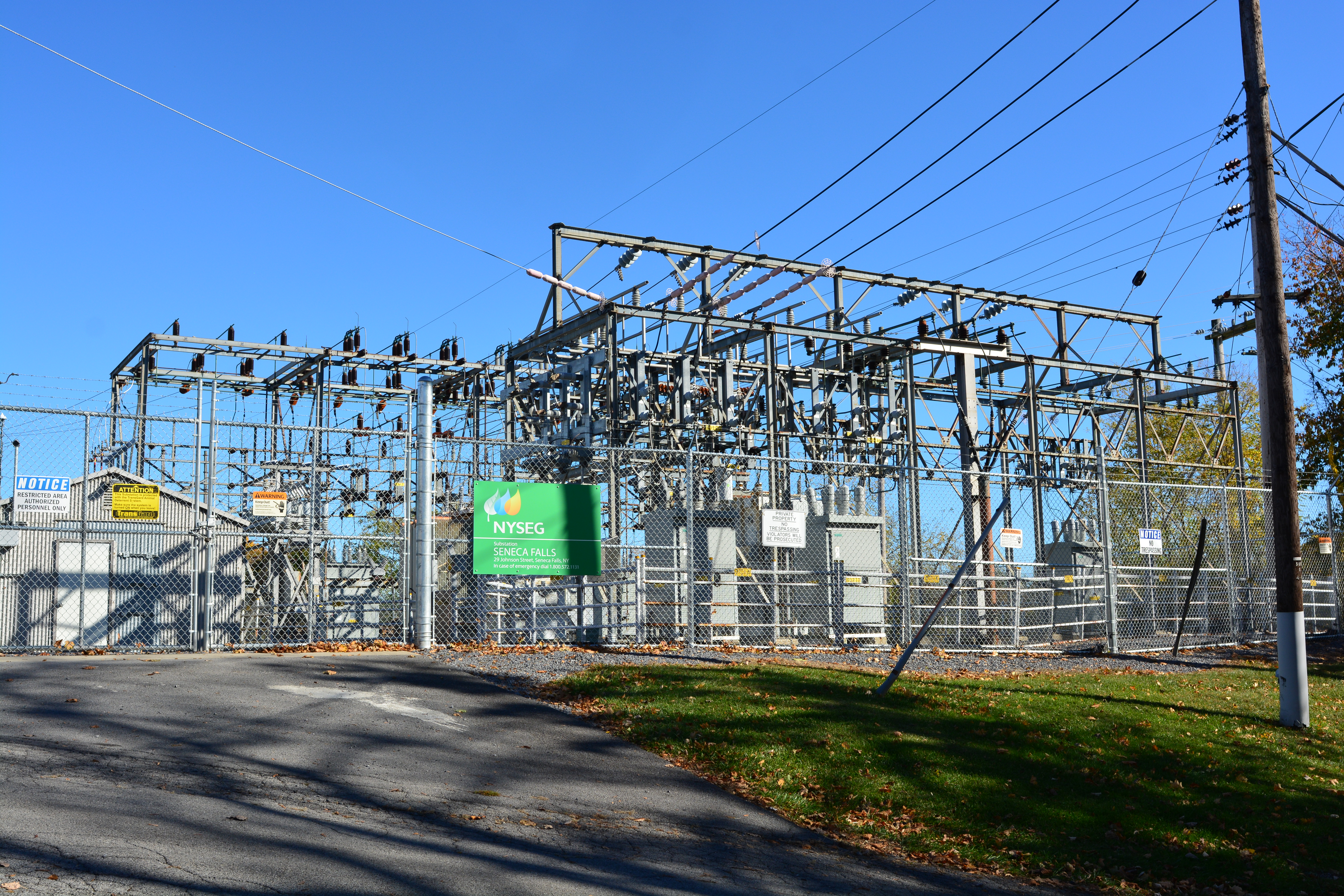
- NYSEG Substation Seneca Falls
- Founded: 1852
- Headquarters: Binghamton, New York, United States
- Owner: Avangrid
- Website: www.nyseg.com

New York State Electric and Gas (NYSEG) is an electric and gas utility company owned by Avangrid that serves customers in New York.

== History ==
NYSEG was incorporated in 1852 as the Ithaca Gas Light Company. Throughout the end of the 19th century and the early part of the 20th century, the corporation went through mergers and acquisitions that combined about 200 utility companies under the name NYSEG. In 1975, the corporation became an 18 percent partner in the Niagara Mohawk Power Corporation’s Nine Mile Point nuclear plant, and in the 1980s, NYSEG completed a series of hydroelectric power plants.

In 2008, NYSEG became part of Iberdrola, when Iberdrola bought Energy East.

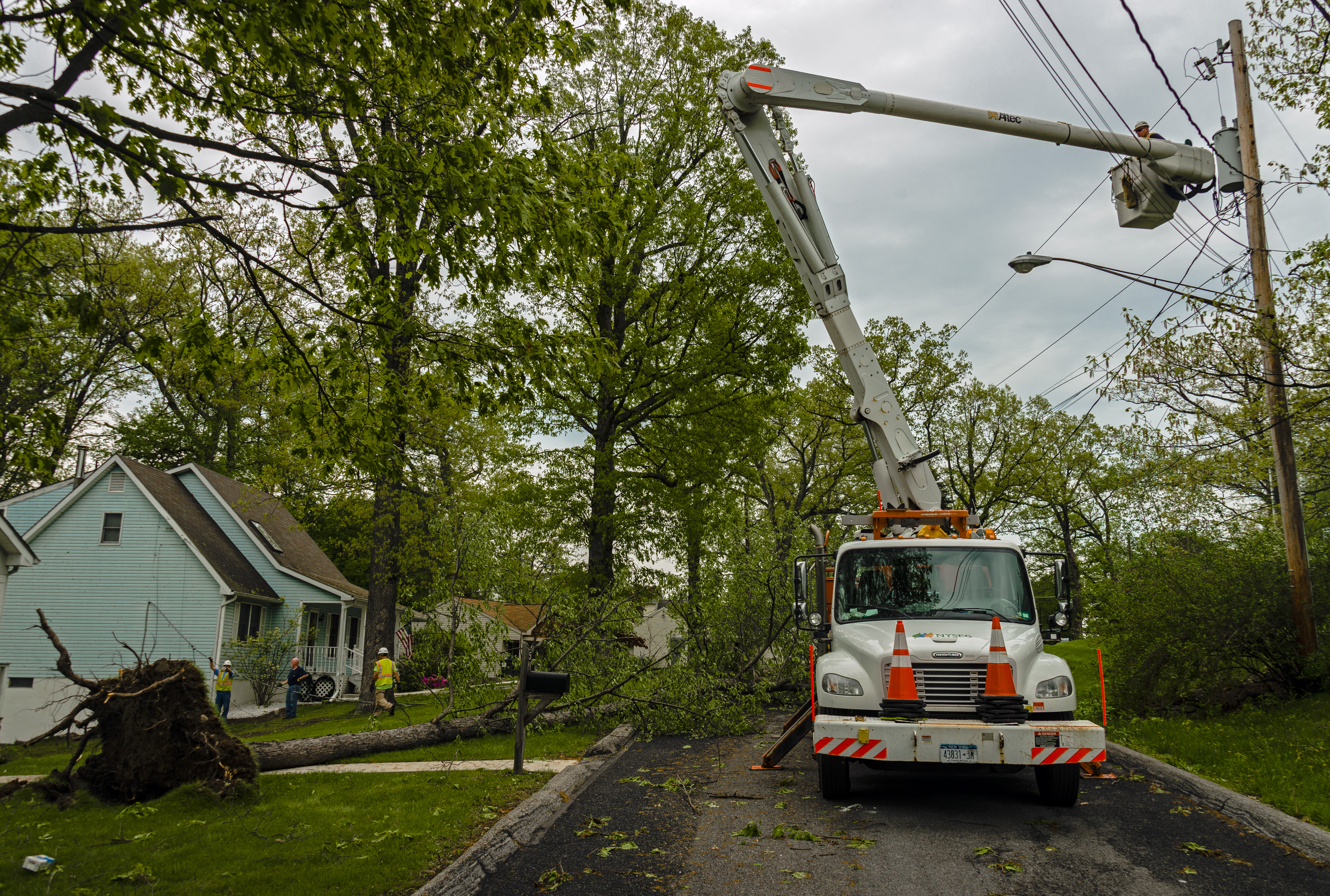
NYSEG lineman clearing a downed tree off a power line after the May 2018 Northeast derecho in Walden, New York

== See also ==
- New York State Public Service Commission
