= Aldeadávila Dam =

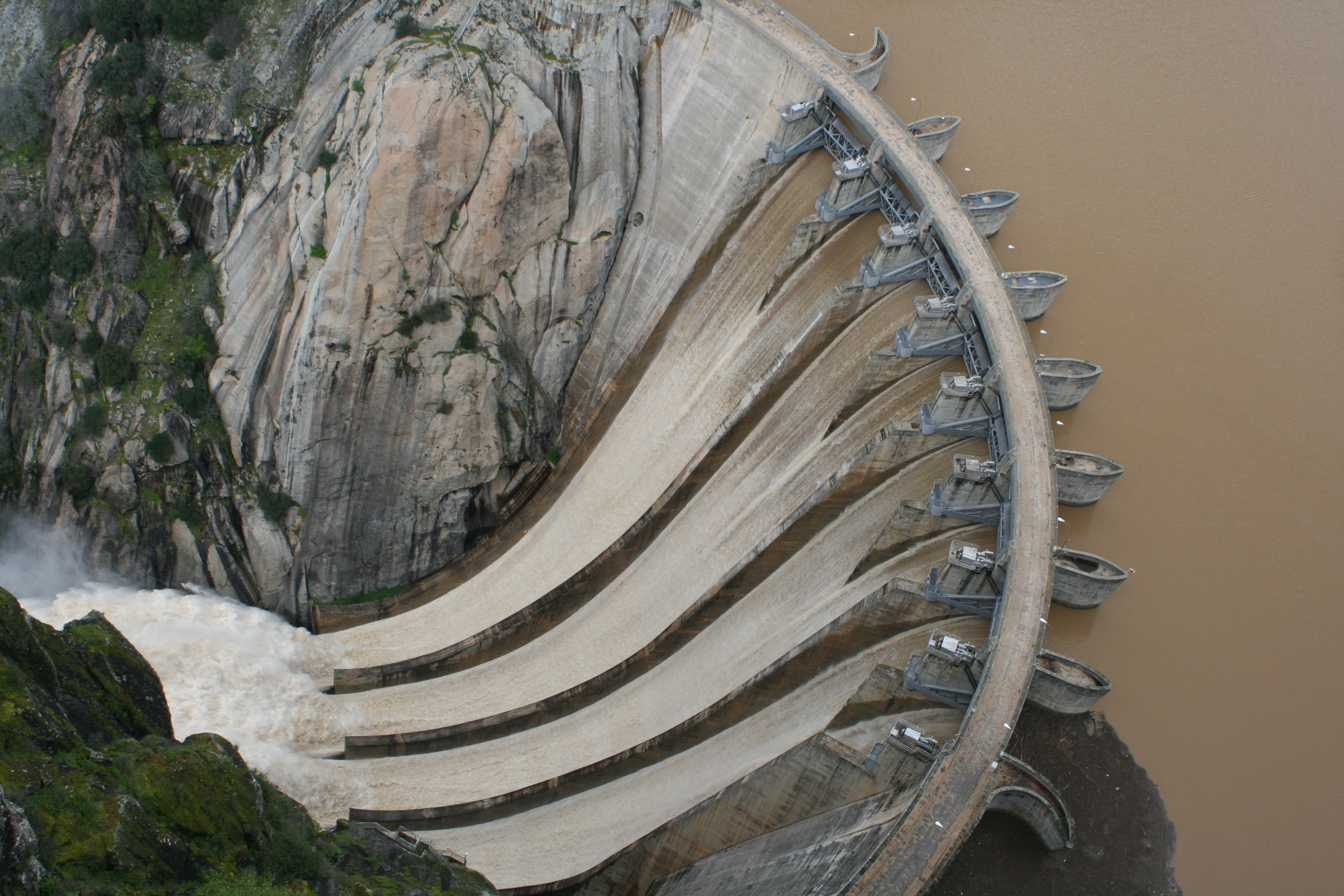
- Aldeadávila Dam in 2010
- Interactive map of Aldeadávila Dam
- Official name: Presa de Aldeadávila
- Location: Near Aldeadávila de la Ribera, Salamanca, Spain
- Coordinates: 41°12′42″N 6°41′08″W
- Construction began: 1956
- Opening date: 1962
- Construction cost: US$60 million in 1962
- Owner: Iberdrola

Dam and spillways
- Type of dam: Concrete arch-gravity
- Impounds: Douro River
- Height: 140 metres (460 ft)
- Length: 250 metres (820 ft)
- Spillway type: Service, chute
- Spillway capacity: 11,700 cubic metres (410,000 cu ft) per second

Reservoir
- Creates: Aldeadávila Reservoir
- Total capacity: 114,800,000 m^{3} (93,100 acre⋅ft)
- Active capacity: 56,600,000 m^{3} (45,900 acre⋅ft)
- Surface area: 3.64 km^{2} (1.41 sq mi)

Power Station
- Operator: Iberdrola
- Commission date: Aldeadávila I : 1962; Aldeadávila II : 1986
- Turbines: 6 x 119.7 MW Francis turbines 2 x 210.5 MW Francis pump-turbines
- Installed capacity: 1,139.2 MW (1,527,700 hp)

The Aldeadávila Dam is a Spanish concrete arch-gravity dam, straddling the border between Spain and Portugal on the Duero River (Douro in Portuguese). The nearest town is Aldeadávila de la Ribera in the province of Salamanca, about 11.3 kilometres (7.0 mi) to the east. The nearest Portuguese town is Fornos in Bragança District, about 8 kilometres (5.0 mi) to the southwest. The Portuguese side of the river around the dam site lies within the Arribes del Duero Natural Park.

== Overview ==
In 1864, Portugal and Spain signed the "Treaty of Limits" (ratified in 1866), which established the present international boundaries of the two nations. A treaty on transboundary rivers, clarifying issues regarding the use of such rivers, was signed and affirmed in 1912.

A treaty regulating the development of hydroelectric facilities on the Duero River was signed in 1927. The Aldeadávila Dam was built by Spain pursuant to these treaties, and was the final dam to be built by Spain on the section of river allotted to that country.

The dam is 140 metres (460 ft) high and its cost was estimated in 1962 at US$60 million (about $443.5 million in 2010 inflated-adjusted dollars). It was one of a series of very high dams built in Europe in the two decades after World War II; these were designed with a downstream face inclined toward the upstream flow. This simplified the dam's design and construction (although it required more concrete to build), and more readily incorporated the spillways into the dam face. The dam's face is nearly vertical. Design work on the dam began in 1956, and construction completed in 1963. The structure was built by the Iberdrola Ingeniería y Construcción construction firm. Pedro Martínez Artola was the design engineer. The dam was built on high-quality granite rock. During construction, grouting was used to fill cracks in the rock which ran parallel to the dam's foundation, and on the Portuguese bank where two fractures in the rock occurred.

The underground power station and tunnels were excavated using a mining procedure known as large-chamber stoping. The use of this technique for the Aldeadávila Dam is considered a textbook example. The turbine and generator hall, and the transformer hall were both cut from solid granite as well. The turbine and generator room is 140 metres (460 ft) long, 18 metres (59 ft) wide, and 40 metres (130 ft) deep. The total volume of excavated material for all halls, rooms, and abutments was 600,175 cubic metres (785,000 yd^{3}).

The structure has eight overflow gates which channel water into four spillways. The spillways incorporate side piers on the upstream face to more correctly channel water over the dam so that each spillway discharges the same amount of water. The spillways release their water slightly above the actual bed of the river, creating a waterfall effect when they are fully open. A spillway tunnel carved from granite in the right bank of the river augments the spillways and provides for additional overflow. The total spillway capacity is half that of Grand Coulee Dam in the United States. The Export-Import Bank of the United States provided $8.9 million (about $67.2 million in 2010 inflation-adjusted dollars) in credits in 1958 to Iberduero to enable it to purchase six 119.7 Megawatt (MW) turbines and other electrical equipment for the power generating station, all of which were supplied by American firms.

The dam won Spain an international reputation as a builder of very large dams. The dam's "ski jump" style spillways are its most noted feature by leading dam engineers.

The canyon through which the Duero River flows is exceptionally deep and narrow, resulting in a reservoir that has a relatively small surface area for its immense size. In some ways, this limits use of the reservoir for recreational activities. However, the Aldeadávila Dam reservoir is a popular one for boating.

=== Power plant ===
Until the Alcántara Dam, also in Spain, was built in 1969, the Aldeadávila Dam was the largest hydroelectric power plant in Western Europe. As of 2018, and after some upgrades, it remains the largest in Spain, with a total output generating power of 1,142 megawatts (1,531,000 hp). The dam's original Aldeadávila I Power Station houses six 119.2-megawatt (159,800 hp) Francis turbines for a total generating output of 718.2 megawatts (963,100 hp). In 1986, the Aldeadávila II Power Station extension was completed, adding two 210.5-megawatt (282,300 hp) Francis pump-turbines, boosting generating capacity by 421 megawatts (565,000 hp).

During periods when the demand for electricity is low (such as evenings, weekends, or during seasonal fluctuations), the dam's two pumped-storage generators can use its excess power-generating capacity to pump water back into the reservoir—enhancing reservoir capacity and storing water for periods when the demand for electricity is high. At the time it was constructed, the Aldeadávila Dam had the largest pumping station capacity in Europe.

The dam has two diversion tunnels, each 1,400 metres (4,600 ft) in length. Each tunnel has a 53-metre (174 ft) high surge tank. The dam also contains more than 12 kilometres (7.5 mi) of tunnels which divert water to the electrical generation turbines. There are six penstock tunnels, each about 5 metres (16 ft) in diameter. The design of the penstocks and auxiliary spillways using these tunnels has proved to be an issue, however. Cavitation problems have damaged these tunnels in the past.

== In popular culture ==
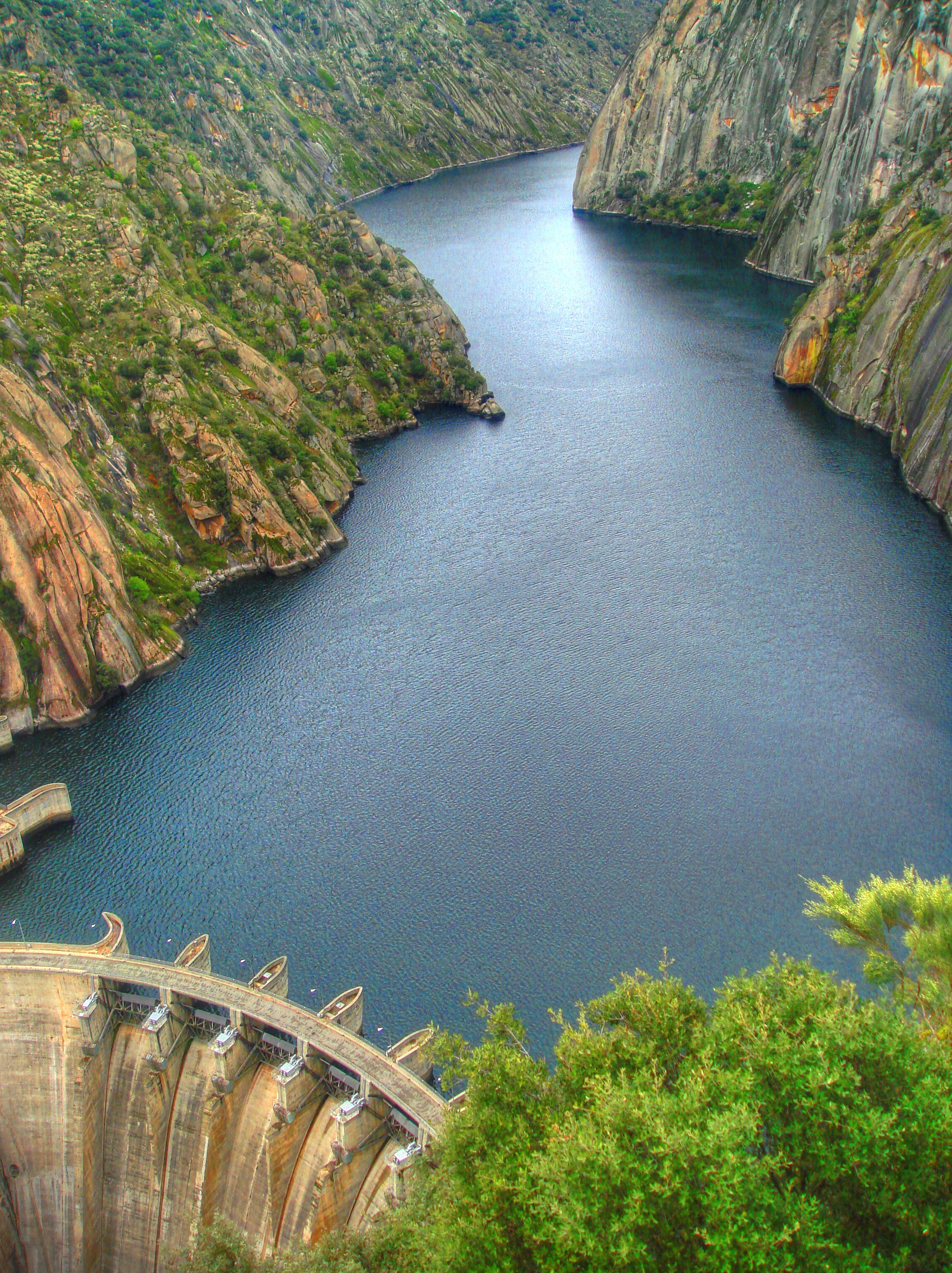
The initial and final scenes of Doctor Zhivago were shot here.

A 30-minute documentary about the dam, La presa de Aldeadávila, was produced by Iberduero (the power company that built the dam) in 1963. Several scenes in the 1965 David Lean film Doctor Zhivago were filmed at the Aldeadávila Dam. The dam's famous spillways were opened for the filming, and are shown in the motion picture open at full force. Another scene depicts workers walking into one of the dam's enormous tunnels. The final scenes of Antonio Mercero's 1972 film, La cabina (The Telephone Box) were also filmed inside the dam. Terminator: Dark Fate filmed a scene at the dam. Fast X was also filmed at the dam.
