= Iberduero =

Spanish electricity company

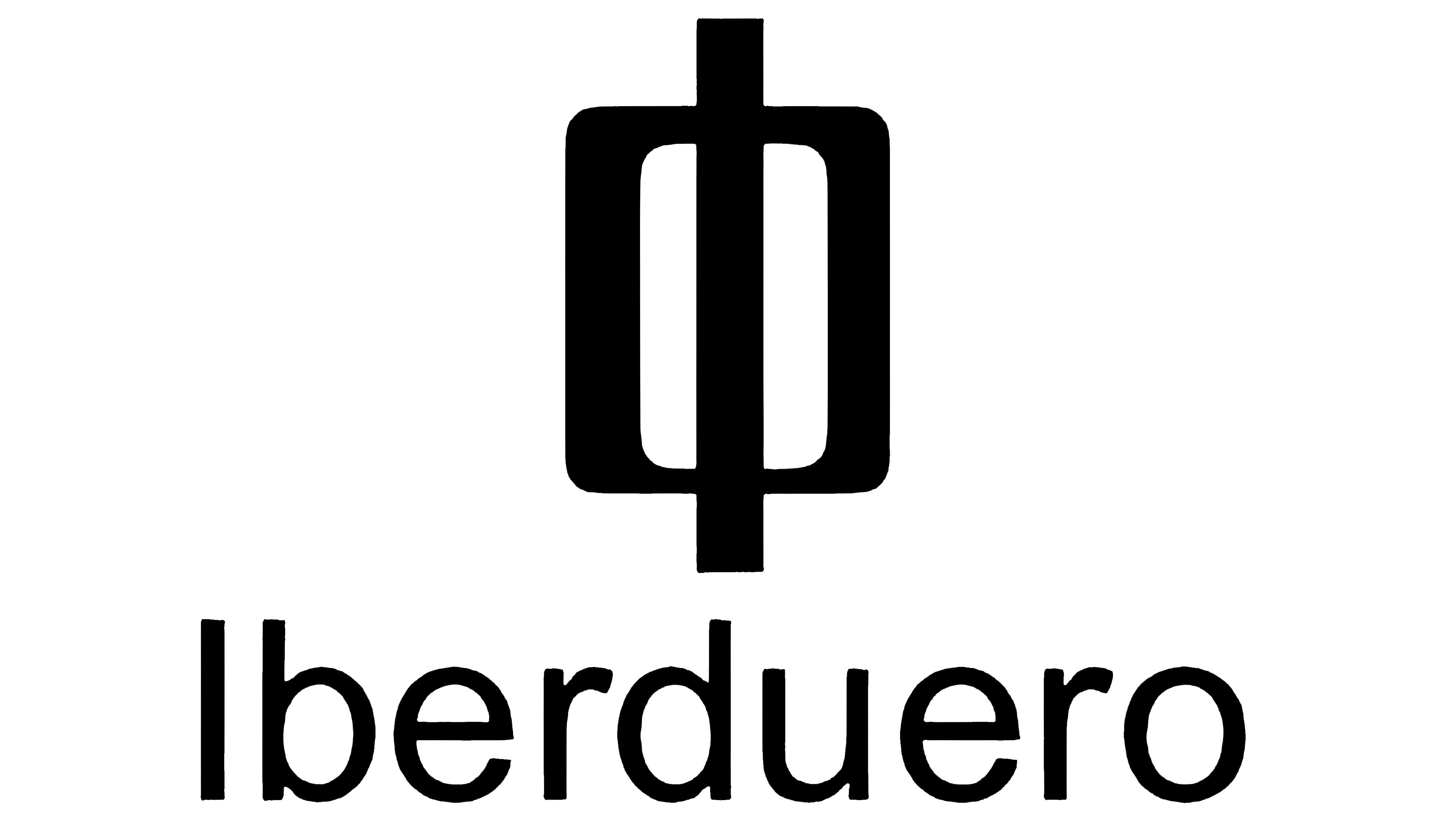
- Abbreviation: ID
- Formation: 1944
- Founder: Pedro Careaga Basabe
- Dissolved: 1992
- Type: Private limited company
- Headquarters: Bilbao, Spain
- Services: Electricity generation and distribution
- Leader: Manuel Gómez de Pablo
- Subsidiaries: Electra Aguera, Electra de Burgos, Electra de Extremadura, Electra Popular Vallisoletana, Electra de Salamanca, Electra de Soria, Electra de Logroño, Compañía Eléctrica del Urumea, Fuerzas Eléctricas de Navarra, El Irati, León Industrial, Vitoriana de Electricidad and Saltos del Sil.
- Staff: 1,000+

Iberduero (IBEX 35: IBE) was a Spanish company, dedicated to the generation and distribution of electricity, founded in Bilbao in 1944, as a result of the merger of Hidroeléctrica Ibérica and Saltos del Duero. Listed on the Madrid Stock Exchange, it was one of the leading Spanish companies in the electricity sector, and in 1992 it merged, through a takeover bid, with Hidroeléctrica Española to create Iberdrola, one of the five most important companies in the sector worldwide.

== Foundation ==
The origin of Iberduero is in the company Hidroeléctrica Ibérica, which was founded in Bilbao by the engineer Juan Urrutia Zulueta on July 19, 1901, with capital provided by the BBVA. Initially, this company was dedicated to the hydroelectric exploitation of several waterfalls that it built in the north of Spain, mainly in the Ebro basin. In 1944, Hidroeléctrica Ibérica absorbed Saltos del Duero, which had been founded in 1918 to exploit the hydroelectric exploitation of the Douro River in its section bordering Portugal. The merger was completed on September 30, 1944, giving rise to Iberduero S.L.

== Expansion ==
In 1970, Iberduero, together with its subsidiaries, already produced 27% of the electrical energy consumed in Spain. Its subsidiaries were Electra Aguera, Electra de Burgos, Electra de Extremadura, Electra Popular Vallisoletana, Electra de Salamanca, Electra de Soria, Electra de Logroño, Compañía Eléctrica del Urumea, Fuerzas Eléctricas de Navarra, El Irati, León Industrial, Vitoriana de Electricidad and Saltos del Sil. In addition, it was part of Nuclenor (operation of nuclear power plants) and Terminor (operation of thermal power stations), both shared 50/50 with Electra de Viesgo.

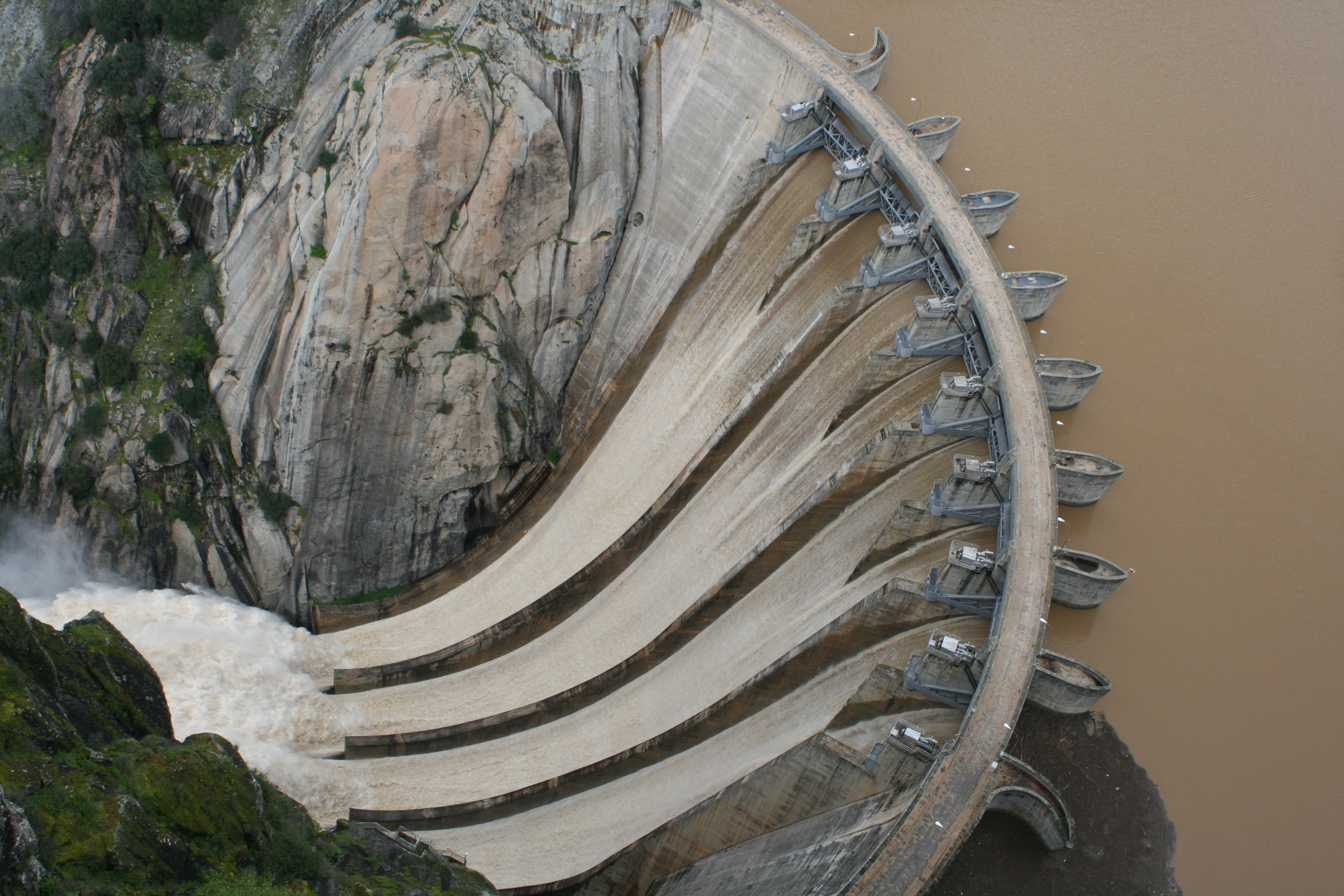
The Aldeadávila Dam, the most important hydroelectric engineering work in Spain in terms of installed power and electricity production. The section where it is located is known as the Arribes del Duero, a deep geographic depression that establishes the border between Spain and Portugal.

Iberduero developed a large hydroelectric system, with more than 100 plants, being especially important the one formed by the plants located on the Douro and its tributaries, which included the Aldeadávila, Saucelle, Almendra, Castro, Ricobayo and Villalcampo dams.

Iberduero's thermoelectric program began in the 1960s. In 1965 it started up the expansion of the Burceña power plant in Barakaldo, in 1968 the Pasajes thermal power plant and in 1969 the Santurce power plant. As part of Terminor, it started up the Velilla power plant in 1964, although in 1984 it bought its part from Electra de Viesgo and built a second group.

It also participated in the generation of electricity from nuclear energy. To this end, it also formed a 50/50 alliance with Electra de Viesgo in the creation of Nuclenor in 1957, which carried out the construction and start-up of the Garoña nuclear power plant in 1971. Iberduero also undertook the construction of the Lemóniz nuclear power plant, which was paralyzed in 1982 when it became the target of the terrorist organization ETA, which attacked its facilities and murdered two of its engineers (José María Ryan and Ángel Pascual Múgica) and three workers. In 1985, it became the sole shareholder in the Almaraz nuclear power plant (53%) and in the Trillo nuclear power plant (51%).

== Merger ==
In 1990, Iberduero and Hidroeléctrica Española (Hidrola, one of its main competitors) began negotiations aimed at a possible union of their interests, seeking an alliance that would balance the electricity market, which was 40% dominated by Endesa, the same percentage that would be reached by the merger of both companies. The final agreement was reached on May 1, 1991, and the system used was a takeover bid presented by Iberduero for the integration of both companies. At the time of the merger, Hidrola had 418,605,724 shares, and Iberduero had 508,526,934; the agreement stipulated that one Iberduero share would have the same value as one share of the new company, while 5 Hidrola shares would be equivalent to 4 Hidrola shares plus 250 pesetas.

On December 12, 1992, the company resulting from the merger was legally incorporated, which would bear a name composed of those of the two previous companies: Iberdrola. This act also involved the absorption of the subsidiaries of both companies: Eléctrica de Langreo, Electra de Logroño, Vitoriana de Electricidad, Fuerzas Eléctricas de Navarra, Compañía Eléctrica del Urumea, Centrales Térmicas del Norte (Terminor) and Edificaciones Iberoamericanas.

== Presidents ==
- Pedro Careaga Basabe (1944-1977)
- Pedro de Areitio (1977-1981)
- Manuel Gómez de Pablo (1981-1992)

== Bibliography ==
- García Adán, Juan Carlos; Yolanda, Diego Martín (2005). "EL ARCHIVO HISTÓRICO DE IBERDROLA Y LA INDUSTRIA ELÉCTRICA EN ESPAÑA: FONDOS PARA LA INVESTIGACIÓN HISTÓRICA" (PDF). CONGRESO DE HISTORIA ECONÓMICA (in Spanish). Santiago de Compostela.
