= Southern Connecticut Gas =

Gas Company in Southern Connecticut

Southern Connecticut Gas Company
- Company type: Subsidiary of Avangrid
- Industry: Natural Gas
- Predecessor: New Haven Gas; Bridgeport Gas
- Founded: 1847
- Headquarters: Orange, Connecticut, United States
- Area served: Southern Connecticut
- Key people: James P. Torgerson - President & CEO of UIL Holdings Corporation
- Website: www.soconngas.com

== Overview & History ==
The Southern Connecticut Gas Company (SCG) is a natural gas distribution company that delivers natural gas and energy services to residential, commercial and industrial customers along or near the Long Island Sound shoreline. SCG is a subsidiary of Avangrid.

The company's service territory includes the Connecticut cities of Bridgeport and New Haven, as well as the towns of Easton, Fairfield, Stratford, Trumbull, Westport and Weston in Fairfield County; Branford, East Haven, Guilford, Hamden, Madison, Milford, North Branford, North Haven, Orange, West Haven and Woodbridge in New Haven County; and Clinton, Westbrook, Essex and Old Saybrook in Middlesex County.
