= The United Illuminating Company =

Electric distribution company in Connecticut

- Company type: Subsidiary of Avangrid
- Industry: Electric Utilities
- Founded: 1899
- Headquarters: Orange, Connecticut, United States
- Area served: Southern Connecticut
- Key people: James P. Torgerson - President & CEO of UIL Holdings Corporation
- Products: transmission and distribution
- Parent: UIL Holdings Corporation
- Website: www.uinet.com

The United Illuminating Company (UI) is a regional electric distribution company based in Orange, Connecticut. Established in 1899, UI is engaged in the purchase, transmission, distribution and sale of electricity and related services to 325,000 residential, commercial and industrial customers in 17 towns and cities in the greater New Haven and Bridgeport areas. It is a subsidiary of Avangrid.

== History ==
UI’s roots can be traced to 1881, with the founding of the New Haven Electric Lighting Company, established to provide electric lighting to the city of New Haven. The company had a troubled start and in 1883 was reorganized as the New Haven Electric Company.

In 1899, the New Haven Electric Company, under the leadership of James English, acquired the Bridgeport Electric Light Company. The new company, renamed The United Illuminating Company, flourished in the new century as Connecticut became an important manufacturing center, and UI’s franchise spread outward from the cities of New Haven and Bridgeport to outlying towns. Regulated as a utility, UI for many years exclusively owned and operated the electric generation, transmission and distribution facilities in the greater New Haven and Bridgeport areas.

In 2000, as a result of Connecticut’s 1998 deregulation legislation, UI was required to sell its electricity generation plants, including the facilities at New Haven and Bridgeport harbors, and to divest from other generation projects including the Connecticut Yankee and Millstone nuclear power plants.

In that same year, UI became a subsidiary of UIL Holdings Corporation, a New Haven-based corporation structured to hold both the regulated UI and other non-regulated business entities.

UI continues to own and operate the transmission and distribution delivery infrastructure within its 17-town service territory. (*)

== Major projects ==
United Illuminating, along with Eversource Energy, previously known as Northeast Utilities (parent company of Connecticut Light and Power), has participated in a number of projects to improve the reliability of the power grid in southwest Connecticut. The first, involving construction of the $350 million 345-kilovolt Bethel-Norwalk transmission line through the western part of the state, was constructed entirely by Eversource Energy.

Both companies together completed the 69-mile (112 km), 345-kilovolt Middletown-Norwalk transmission line at a cost of $900 million. It was energized in 2009.
