= Iberdrola =

Spanish multinational electric utility company

Iberdrola, S.A.

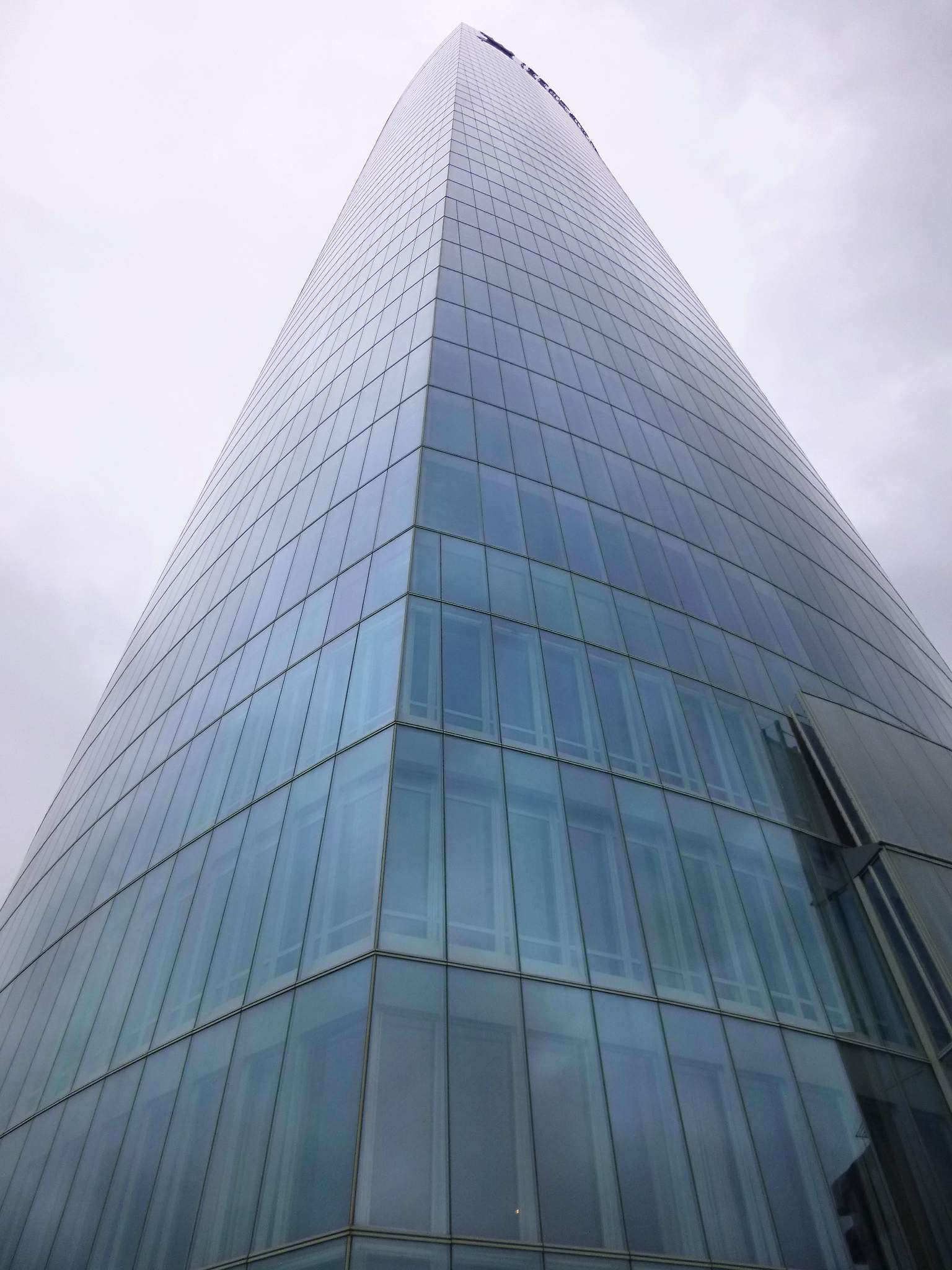
- Headquarters in Iberdrola Tower, Bilbao
- Type: Sociedad Anónima
- Traded as: BMAD: IBE; IBEX 35
- ISIN: ES0144580Y14
- Industry: Electric utility
- Founded: 1 November 1992; 34 years ago
- Headquarters: Iberdrola Tower, Bilbao, Spain
- Key people: Ignacio Galán (Chairman); Pedro Azagra (CEO); José Sainz Armada (CFO)
- Products: Electricity generation and distribution, renewable energy, natural gas production, sale and distribution, telecommunications
- Revenue: ▲€45,546.8 billion (2025)
- Operating income: ▲€10.28 billion (2025)
- Net income: ▲€6,285 billion (2025)
- Total assets: ▲€160 billion (2025)
- Number of employees: ▲45,400 (2025)
- Subsidiaries: Elektro Holding; Avangrid; ScottishPower
- Website: www.iberdrola.com

Iberdrola, S.A. (Spanish pronunciation: [iβeɾˈðɾola]) is a Spanish multinational electric utility company based in Bilbao, Spain. It has around 40,000 employees and serves around 30 million customers.

Subsidiaries include ScottishPower (United Kingdom), Avangrid (United States) and Neoenergia (Brazil), amongst others. As of 2023, the largest shareholder of the company is the Qatar Investment Authority, with BlackRock and Norges Bank (managers of the Norwegian Government Pension Fund Global) also holding significant interests.

Iberdrola is the largest producer of wind power, and the world's second largest electricity utility by market capitalisation. As of 2023, the company operates a capacity of 62,045 MW, of which 41,246 MW are from renewable sources worldwide.

== History ==
=== Pre-WWII ===
Iberdrola was created on 1 November 1992, from the merger between Hidroeléctrica Española and Iberduero. Hidroeléctrica Española, also known as Hidrola, had started in 1907, while Iberduero arose from the merger between Hidroeléctrica Ibérica and Saltos del Duero in 1944.

The origin of Iberdrola lies in the Spanish industrialisation in the early 20th century. In 1840, American entrepreneurs founded the Hartford City Light Company, which led to the incorporation of Energy East on the eastern seaboard of the US, which would much later become Iberdrola USA. Meanwhile, in Bilbao in 1901, Hidroeléctrica Ibérica was established by the engineer Juan de Urrutia. In 1907, Hidroeléctrica Ibérica shareholders created Hidroeléctrica Española to supply Madrid and Valencia. A decade later, Saltos del Duero was founded, opening the country's first hydroelectric facility in 1935, the Ricobayo power plant.

World War I forced the industry to seek new sources of energy and to install large distribution networks. Amid huge instability, US power companies underwent consolidation to decrease their financial uncertainty. The stock market crash of 1929 and the accompanying Great Depression brought many of these companies to the verge of ruin. In Spain, which had experienced a period of economic growth at the start of the 20th century, the industry suffered a severe setback in 1936 whose impact would be felt for the following two decades: the Spanish Civil War abruptly halted development, destroyed facilities and made maintaining the remaining equipment extremely difficult. In the 1940s, Spain experienced extreme difficulty in acquiring technology and materials due to international isolation and soaring prices. The company benefited from the legal and social framework of the francoist dictatorship for its growth in economic and social relevance. Notably, the president between 1935 and 1985 of one of the former mergers, Hidroeléctrica Española, José María de Oriol y Urquijo, was a relevant Spanish nationalist who allegedly declared to have been part in the investigation and prosecution of more than 80,000 people in the Basque Country.

=== Post-WWII ===
In 1944 Hidroeléctrica Ibérica and Saltos del Duero merged to form Iberduero.

In 1955, the South of Scotland Electricity Board (SSEB) came into being, paving the way for the creation of ScottishPower four decades later, in 1990. Two years after that, Hidroeléctrica Española and Iberduero merged to form Iberdrola. In the latter part of the 20th century, Iberdrola began expanding into Latin America, mainly Mexico and Brazil.

With ScottishPower and Iberdrola formed in Europe, in 1998 Energy East Corporation came into being in the US following New York State Electric & Gas's acquisition of Central Maine Power, Southern Connecticut Gas Company, Connecticut Natural Gas Company, Berkshire Gas Company and RGS Energy Group (the parent of Rochester Gas & Electric). Following the arrival of Jose Ignacio Sanchez Galan in 2001 Iberdrola began focusing on renewable energy. In 2007, the company continued its international expansion, increasing its presence in the UK and the US via the integration of ScottishPower and Energy East. As a culmination of his commitment to renewable energy, Jose Ignacio Sanchez Galan has received the ESG Leadership Award from The Foreign Policy Association in New York, which recognizes leaders most committed to ESG principles.

By 2011, Iberdrola had moved into the Brazilian market with the acquisition of Elektro.

In 2015, the company made another significant move in the U.S. by acquiring United Illuminating (UIL), a publicly traded company, for 2,647 million euros. That same year, following the integration of Iberdrola USA and UIL Holdings Corporation, Avangrid was established and began trading on the New York Stock Exchange.

In 2020 multiple acquisitions by Iberdrola were made. The company acquired Infigen Energy in Australia and subsequently renamed it Iberdrola Australia. In France, the company acquired Aalto Power, a renewable energy company with a focus on wind energy projects. In the U.S., Iberdrola made a move to purchase PNM Resources, an electricity provider for Texas and New Mexico, with the acquisition process subject to approval from the New Mexico Regulatory Commission. Additional 2020 acquisitions included CEB-D distributor in Brazil and Acacias Renewables in Japan.

In 2021, Iberdrola ventured into the Taiwanese market by acquiring offshore wind projects. By 2023, the company diversified its portfolio by selling assets from non-renewable sources in Mexico to Mexico Infrastructure Partners (MIP).

Since 2001, the company has been committed to renewable energies and since 2006 it has continued its international expansion, increasing its presence in the United Kingdom, the United States and Brazil.

In 2014, the 850 MW La Muela II pumped-storage hydroelectric power plant began operating, which, together with La Muela I, is the largest complex of its kind in Europe with almost 1,500 MW. The same year Iberdrola's first offshore wind farm in the Irish Sea (United Kingdom), West of Duddon Sands with 389 MW of power was launched, as well as Maine high voltage transmission line connecting the United States and Canada was installed.

In 2015, the company committed to reduce CO_{2} emissions by 50% by 2030 and at the end of 2017 announced its intention to close all of its coal-fired power plants worldwide. Iberdrola announced an investment to a total of €47 billion, of which €17 billion in renewables to increase renewable capacity by 12,100 MW to 52,000 MW in 2025 (6,300 MW of photovoltaic, 3,100 MW of onshore wind, 1,800 MW of offshore, 700 MW of batteries and 200 MW of hydro).

Iberdrola started sponsoring Women's Soccer League in Spain, which adopted its name (Primera Iberdrola), and collaborated with the Consejo Superior de Deportes (The National Sports Council) in the Universo Mujer program in 2016. The same year it launched Calangos complex in Brazil, the largest wind power facility in South America.

In 2019, it launched the call for its 2020 Social Program to support vulnerable groups, with a budget of more than one million euros. The company also inaugurated the Baixo Iguaçu hydroelectric plant, supplying clean energy to one million Brazilians. East Anglia ONE offshore wind farm started generating clean electrical energy. Iberdrola launched i-DE, the new brand of its electricity distribution activity in Spain, which manages 270,000 km of digitalised power lines.

That year Iberdrola entered the ranking of the 100 most sustainable companies in the world, according to the latest classification carried out by Corporate Knights. The European Commission classified Iberdrola as the most innovative Spanish utility and third of Europe. Iberdrola's direct tax contribution worldwide amounted to 8,156 million euros in 2019, 217 million more than in 2018. In 2024, Iberdrola became the first business head-quartered in Spain to secure Fair Tax Mark certification.

In 2020, the company's investments of 8,158 million euros raised Iberdrola's net profit to 3,406 million euros in 2019. That year, the largest photovoltaic plant in Europe was commissioned—the Núñez de Balboa plant (500 MW) in Badajoz. Iberdrola located its global smart grid innovation center in Spain. In Australia, construction was started on Port Augusta, its first wind-solar hybrid plant in the world. In the United States, the purchase operation of PNM Resources, the electricity company of New Mexico and Texas, was pending permission from the Regulatory Commission. Also in 2020 (and 2021), the company was listed among the 10 best companies in the world in terms of integration of women, according to the World's Top Female Friendly Companies 2021 study, as well as in the Dow Jones Sustainability Index (being the only European utility company to be named in 22 editions of the index).

In 2021, Iberdrola announced, through its British subholding ScottishPower, the investment of an additional 6 billion pounds (7,090 million euros) in the construction of the East Anglia Hub offshore wind farm (North Sea – United Kingdom). This offshore wind macro complex is bringing together three projects with a total installed capacity of 2,900 MW: East Anglia ONE North, East Anglia TWO and East Anglia THREE. The works, involving an investment of 10 billion pounds, began in 2022 and planned to last four years.

In 2022, the company inaugurated the Puertollano green hydrogen plant (Puertollano – Ciudad Real), able to produce up to 3,000 tonnes of renewable hydrogen per year and supply clean hydrogen to the Fertiberia Group factory in town, allowing to reduce the consumption of natural gas. The total investment in the Puertollano plant is 150 million euros. It includes both green hydrogen facilities and a dedicated photovoltaic plant. It is able to reach up to 3,000 tons of green hydrogen per year and avoid the emission of 78,000 tons of CO_{2} per year.

In 2022, Iberdrola inaugurated the Tâmega hydroelectric complex (Tâmega River – northern Portugal) with an investment of 1.5 billion euros. It involves the construction of three dams and three power plants (Gouvaes, Daivoes and Alto Tamega) with a combined capacity of 1,158 megawatts (MW), increasing 6% of the total electrical power in the country. In 2022, investments of 10,730 million euros raised Iberdrola's net profit to 4,339 million euros, which represents an increase of 11.6% compared to the previous year. During the year, Iberdrola reached 40 GW of operational renewable energy and expects to add 7,675 MW in the next four years (of which, 3,500 MW will be offshore wind). In addition, it reached an emission of 59 grams CO_{2}/kWh in Europe. At the beginning of 2022, Iberdrola commissioned a 730 km energy transmission line in Brazil, the largest power line across its operations globally.

At the end of 2022, Iberdrola Group had 60,761 MW of total installed capacity, of which 40,066 MW is renewable. In 2023, the company reached a capacity of 62,045MW and 41,246 MW respectively, increasing the renewables by 6.5% worldwide.

In February 2023, the company started developing a solar module factory in Langreo, Spain with an initial investment of €20 million. In March 2023 Iberdrola and BP signed a strategic alliance to accelerate the deployment of electric mobility and decarbonisation of transport. Specifically, their collaboration includes investing €1 billion to deploy a network of 11,700 fast and ultra-fast charging points for electric vehicles in Spain and Portugal.

In April 2023, Iberdrola signed a memorandum of understanding with Mexico Infrastructure Partners to sell 8539 MW of capacity from its gas-fired plants, and its 103 MW wind asset La Venta III as part of the $6 billion deal. The company remained the primary private producer of renewable energy in Mexico, and this initiative is in line with its carbon reduction goals.

The company entered into a strategic partnership with the Abu Dhabi-based company Masdar to jointly develop the 476 MW Baltic Eagle offshore wind farm in the German Baltic Sea in summer 2023.

In July 2023, Iberdrola agreed on a deal with Vodafone to provide renewable energy across three countries – Spain, Portugal and Germany with 410GWh of solar energy from newly constructed solar plants.

As of the summer of 2023, 7,100 MW of new renewables capacity is under construction globally for a total investment of €12 billion, of which 3,000 MW relates to offshore wind.

According to the data published by the National Securities Market Commission (CNMV) in July 2023, the company has increased its renewables installed capacity by 6.5% worldwide in the last 12 months, reaching a total of 41,246 MW.

As of 2023, the company has a workforce of 41,000 employees and assets of more than €160 billion. In 2023, Iberdrola's net profit for the first half rose to €2.52 billion from 2.08 billion euros a year earlier.

The European Investment Bank and Iberdrola have signed a €1 billion financing arrangement in 2023 to develop 19 solar power plants and three onshore wind farms in Spain, Portugal, and Germany. 70% of the plants will be built in rural areas impacted by the transition to net-zero and cohesion zones. The projects will generate enough green energy to power over 1 million households on average each year.

In 2024, Iberdrola reaches an agreement to purchase the remaining 18.4% of its US subsidiary, Avangrid and inauguration of the group's fourth offshore wind farm, Saint-Brieuc in France.

Since the beginning of 2025, Unión General de Trabajadores, Workers' Commissions, and European Labour Authority, representing a majority of Iberdrola employees, have been in negotiations for updated contracts. Unionists allege that executive chairman's José Ignacio Sánchez Galán's salary of "40,000 euros per day, [is] more than the average of the staff per year", and desire wages pegged to inflation and increased labor protections.

In May 2025, the company received a £600 million loan from the National Wealth Fund to upgrade the UK's power grid.

In September 2025, Iberdrola held its Capital Markets Day, where it updated the Strategic Plan first presented in March 2025, increasing investment to €58 billion through to 2028. Eighty-five per cent of this investment will be channelled to countries with an A rating, primarily the United States (€16 billion) and the United Kingdom (€20 billion). Other key areas of investment will include the Iberian Peninsula (€9 billion), Brazil (€7 billion), and EU countries and Australia (€5 billion).

Electricity networks will remain the main focus of investment, particularly in distribution and transmission. As highlighted during the Capital Markets Day, the decision to prioritise the United States and the United Kingdom is based on the fact that these countries offer more favourable regulatory conditions. Between 2029 and 2031, Iberdrola plans to invest a further €45 billion, once again prioritising A-rated countries. The remainder will be allocated to renewables and customer-focused initiatives.

== Acquisitions ==
In 2006, Iberdrola acquired ScottishPower, leading to the integration of this company in April 2007. This gave rise to Europe's third-largest utility.

In 2008, Iberdrola continued its expansion with the acquisition of the US-based company Energy East, further solidifying its global presence.

In 2010 Iberdrola sold their ownership of GESA, majority share owner of EEGSA (Empresa Electrica de Guatemala) to Grupo EPM.

In 2011, the company expanded its operations into Brazil by acquiring the company Elektro, a strategic move to tap into the Brazilian market.

In 2015, Iberdrola acquired the US company United Illuminating for a total of 3 billion euros. This acquisition bolstered Iberdrola's presence in the American market. Also in 2015, Iberdrola established Avangrid through the integration of Iberdrola USA and UIL Holdings Corporation. This move led to the commencement of trading on the New York Stock Exchange, strengthening Iberdrola's position in the United States.

In 2020, Iberdrola acquired the Australian company Infigen Energy. Subsequently, the company was renamed Iberdrola Australia the following year.

In 2020, Iberdrola expanded its renewable energy portfolio with the acquisition of Aalto Power, a French company specialising in renewable energy, and Ailes Marines. Aalto Power was involved in wind energy projects, both in operation and in development.

Also in 2020, Iberdrola made an important move in the United States by purchasing PNM Resources, an electricity company serving Texas and New Mexico. This acquisition's completion is subject to approval from the New Mexico Regulatory Commission. That year, Iberdrola furthered its presence in Brazil by acquiring the CEB-D distributor, enhancing its footprint in the Brazilian energy market. Additionally, Iberdrola expanded its global reach by acquiring Acacias Renewables, a company operating in the renewable energy sector in Japan.

In 2021, Iberdrola acquired offshore wind projects in Taiwan.

In 2023, the company sold its non-renewable assets in Mexico to Mexico Infrastructure Partners (MIP), aligning with its strategic focus on renewable energy.

In August 2024, Iberdrola agreed to acquire a majority stake of 88% in British electricity distribution network operator Electricity North West for €2.5 billion, valuing the company at €5bn including debt. Its biggest deal in almost 10 years, in line with its strategic plan to focus on electricity grids. It has also inaugurated its fourth offshore wind farm in the world, and the first in France, Saint Brieuc.

== Chairmen ==
Hidrola

- José Luis de Oriol y Urigüen (1910–1911) (1936–1941)
- José María de Oriol y Urquijo (1941–1960)
- Íñigo de Oriol e Ybarra (1960–1992)

Iberduero

- Pedro de Careaga y Baseabe, 2nd Count of Cadagua (?–1977)
- Pedro de Areitio (1977–1981)
- Manuel Gómez de Pablos (?–1992)

Iberdrola

- Iñigo de Oriol e Ybarra (1992–2005)
- Jose Ignacio Sanchez Galan (2005 to present)

== Lines of business ==
=== Renewable energy ===
In 2023, the company has 41,250 MW of operational renewables and 7,100 MW under construction.

The Renewables area of the Iberdrola group is responsible for the generation and sale of electrical energy from renewable sources: wind (onshore and offshore), solar, hydroelectric, green hydrogen, etc.

At the end of 2022, Iberdrola Group had 60,761 MW of total installed capacity, of which 40,066 MW is renewable. In 2023, the company reached a capacity of 62,045 MW and 41,246 MW respectively, increasing the renewables by 6.5% worldwide.

==== Offshore wind ====
One of the group's main vectors is offshore wind. It has facilities in UK, Germany, USA, France and develops offshore wind activities in Poland, Sweden, Ireland, the United States, Brazil, the Philippines and Japan, expanding its offshore wind portfolio to 30 GW.

- Japan: Following the acquisition of Acacia Renewables (now Iberdrola Renewables Japan), the company has partnered with Macquarie's GIG for a 3.3 GW offshore wind project in southwest Japan. Additionally, the Seihoku-oki offshore wind project of 600 MW is in development with Cosmo Eco Power and Hitz engineering.
- Taiwan: Iberdrola Taiwan is progressing two offshore wind projects, Da Chung Bu (1,200 MW) and Guo Feng (350 MW), aiming for the 2023 selection in Taiwan's Zonal Development Round 3.2.
- Ireland: Iberdrola is working on the Inis Ealga and Clarus wind farms in County Cork and County Clare, respectively, using floating offshore wind technology. The Shellalere project, off the east coast, will use fixed foundations. Combined, these projects will power about 2.6 million homes.
- Philippines: An agreement with Triconti ECC Renewables grants Iberdrola the option on five offshore wind projects with a potential total capacity of 3.5 GW.
- Brazil: Through Neoenergia, Iberdrola is partnering with Rio Grande do Sul's government on offshore wind endeavours. Key projects include the Águas Claras park and the Jangada Maritime Wind Complex, each with capacities in the gigawatt range.
- Sweden: A collaboration with Svea Vind Offshore AB aims to develop a 9 GW offshore wind energy portfolio, expected to be operational by 2029.
- Poland: Iberdrola's agreement with Augusta Energy will increase its Polish renewable capacity to 261 MW, with a mix of wind and solar projects slated for completion in 2023.

At the end of 2023, Iberdrola had 1,793 MW offshore in operation and 3000 MW under construction or secured with long-term contracts, which will come into operation before 2027 thanks to investments of nearly 30,000 million euros worldwide during this decade.

The company currently has four offshore wind operating plants and four under construction: Baltic Eagle (Germany) and Vineyard Wind I (USA) will come on stream in 2025 and East Anglia 3 (UK) and Windanker (Germany) the following year.

The company's major offshore wind energy projects include:

- East Anglia Hub (United Kingdom) — Iberdrola's biggest offshore wind project worldwide with total installed capacity of 2,900 MW started in 2022 and is able to supply clean energy to 2.7 million British homes.
- Saint-Brieuc (France) — offshore wind power project with a total installed capacity of 496 megawatts (MW) from 62 turbines each generating 8 MW of power, which cover a surface area of 75 km2, located 16 km off the French coast and capable of generating enough clean energy for 835,000 people.
- West of Duddon Sands (United Kingdom) — offshore wind farm, located off the northwest coast of England has a 389 MW capacity.
- Vineyard Wind I (United States) — company's first offshore wind farm in Massachusetts, with a capacity of 800 MW, which is able to meet the energy needs of over 400,000 homes.
- Commonwealth Wind (United Kingdom) — largest offshore wind project in New England that generates enough energy to power. The project is a 1,200-megawatt wind farm planned for about 20 miles south of Martha's Vineyard. Commonwealth Wind was developed by Avangrid Renewables, a part of Iberdrola Group.
- Windanker (Germany) — 300MW offshore wind farm project being developed in the German waters of the Baltic Sea, expected to be operational in 2026.
- Baltic Eagle (Germany) — offshore wind farm, located in the German waters of the Baltic Sea and poised to have an installed capacity of around 476 MW.

==== Onshore wind ====
===== Geographical presence =====
The company has more than 20,000 MW of installed capacity worldwide in onshore wind energy, including the US, Mexico, Brazil, UK, Spain, Portugal, France, Poland, Hungary, Romania, Greece, Cyprus and Australia

Iberdrola has a substantial presence in Brazil's onshore wind sector, with a total capacity of 1,394 MW spread across various states. In Bahia, its Caetité Complex has had 90 MW operational since 2012. Paraíba hosts several of their facilities, including Canoas and Lagoa 1 & 2 with a combined capacity of 96 MW since 2017, and the major Complejo eólico de Chafariz at 471 MW, which began operations in 2021. The Rio Grande do Norte state has been a focal point for Iberdrola, with projects like Rio do Fogo, Mel II, Arizona I, and the expansive Calango Complex, cumulatively contributing over 300 MW. The same state also houses the Santana Complex with 54 MW of capacity.

Iberdrola has several onshore wind facilities in Mexico, totalling 693 MW. In Oaxaca, installations include La Ventosa (80 MW, 2008), Bee Ni Stipa (26 MW, 2010), La Venta III (103 MW, 2011), an expansion of La Ventosa (22 MW, 2013), and Dos Arbolitos (70 MW, 2015). Puebla hosts Pier II (66 MW, 2015) and Pier (221 MW, 2021). Guanajuato has the Santiago Eólico project (105 MW, 2021). Most operate under a commercial PPA, with La Venta III under an Independent Power Producer arrangement.

In the U.S., Iberdrola's Midland onshore wind project in Illinois has a total capacity of 106 MW, fully installed by December 2022, with operations starting in 2023 under a Power Purchase Agreement. The average net capacity factor for Iberdrola's existing onshore wind facilities is around 29%, with new ones at approximately 41%.

In the UK and Ireland, Iberdrola has an extensive onshore wind portfolio. In England, facilities include Carland Cross, Coldham, Lynemouth, and Coal Clough Repowering. Northern Ireland has projects like Corkey, Rigged Hill, Elliots Hill, Callagheen, and Wolf Bog. In the Republic of Ireland, the Barnesmore facility was established in 1997. Scotland is home to a notable number of Iberdrola's onshore facilities, such as Hagshaw Hill, Beinn a Tuirc, Black Law I and II, Whitelee and its extensions, and the more recent Kilgallioch and Halsary projects. Wales features the P&L project. Most of these projects benefit from a 1.0 ROC/MWh support regime, though some later projects transitioned to 0.9 ROC/MWh or corporate PPAs.

Iberdrola Spain has wind plants with installed power that reaches 6,446 MW, enough to supply more than 6,532,352 homes, and with a net production capacity of 5,123 GWh. In Spain, there are almost 200 wind farm installations in 13 autonomous communities.

In Australia, Iberdrola has an onshore wind installation capacity of 880 MW, installed between 2005 and 2021. The support regime for these installations is a combination of the Market and Power Purchase Agreements (PPAs).

In Cyprus, Iberdrola has 20 MW of onshore wind power, installed in 2011. This capacity benefits from a Feed-in Tariff support regime.

Iberdrola's onshore wind installations in Greece total 403 MW, established between 1998 and 2022. These installations are supported by a variety of regimes including Merchant, Feed-in Tariff (FiT), and Feed-in Premium (FiP).

The company boasts an onshore wind capacity of 118 MW in France, installed between 2007 and 2019. The support mechanisms for these plants include FiT, Contracts for Difference (CfD), and Merchant.

In Hungary, Iberdrola has a capacity of 158 MW, installed between 2008 and 2011. The installations in Hungary are supported by a Feed-in Tariff (FiT).

Iberdrola's onshore wind installations in Portugal total 92 MW, installed from 2005 to 2009. These installations benefit from a FiT cap/floor support regime.

In Romania, the company has an onshore wind capacity of 80 MW, set up in 2011. These installations leverage a combination of PPA and Green Certificate as their support regime.

Iberdrola established onshore wind installations totalling 134 MW in Poland, between 2021 and 2022. The installations benefit from a PPA combined with Green Certificates as their support regime.

Iberdrola has more than 20,000 MW of onshore wind installed capacity worldwide.

According to the company's strategic plan, 25% of the investment in renewables will be allocated to increase its installed capacity in this technology by 3,100 MW. In 2023, Iberdrola's onshore wind capacity increased by 4%, compared to 2022, reaching 20,202 MW.

The company's major onshore wind energy projects include:

- Oitis (Brazil) – an onshore wind farm complex in Brazil consisting of 12 wind farms with a total installed capacity of 566.5 MW, which makes it the largest onshore wind farm project in Latin America and the second largest in the world. The project started in 2020 and has a total area of 2.1 million m^{2} and is able to supply around four million people.
- El Escudo (Spain) — the project involves the construction of a wind farm with a capacity of 105 MW in the province of Cantabria. The project is expected to generate enough clean energy to power over 95.000 homes and reduce carbon emissions by 45,000 tons per year.
- Port Augusta Renewable Energy Park (PAREP) (Australia) — a 317 MW hybrid renewable energy project under development in Port Augusta city.
- El Cabo Wind Farm (USA) — a 1,000MW onshore wind power project. It is planned in New Mexico.
- Amazon US East Farm (USA) — located in Virginia, is one of the renewable energy commitments of large North American multinationals. It has been operational since 2017 and generates clean energy through wind power. The farm consists of 100 turbines and has the capacity to produce 300 MW of electricity, enough to power over 100,000 homes.

In 2024, Iberdrola acquired the British electricity distributor Electricity North West (ENW) for EUR 5,000 million, becoming the second largest electricity network operator in the United Kingdom. As a result of this purchase, Iberdrola's regulated assets in networks in the country reach EUR 14 billion.

==== Geographical presence ====
As of 2023, Iberdrola's installed PV capacity exceeds 4,500 MW in USA, Mexico, Brazil, UK, Spain, Australia, Portugal, Italy and Greece.

In July 2023, Iberdrola Germany completed the installation of its inaugural turnkey photovoltaic system at AkzoNobel Powder Coatings GmbH in Reutlingen. Finalized in under a year by an international team, the system is expected to reduce CO_{2} emissions by 125 tons annually.

In Brazil, subsidiary Neoenergia plans to install a floating photovoltaic plant. The project will be built on the Xaréu dam, on the island of Fernando de Noronha, in the northeast of the country. With nearly 940 panels, the plant will cover more than 50% of the energy needs of the island's water and sewage distribution network.

Santiago and Hermosillo photovoltaic power plants (Mexico) are Iberdrola's largest photovoltaic power plants. Located in Mexico and commissioned in 2018. They have 660 000 PV modules and an installed capacity of 170 MW, generating 460 GWh per year. It is capable of supplying electricity to 138,000 homes.

In Great Britain, Iberdrola, through its British subsidiary ScottishPower, agreed to purchase seventeen photovoltaic solar energy projects in the United Kingdom, totalling a combined capacity of more than 800 MW. The plants spread across central England, south Wales and northern Scotland.

In Australia, Port Augusta Renewable Energy Park hosts the first wind-solar hybrid plant in the world. Located in the state of South Australia, the plant combines a 210 MW capacity wind farm and a 107 MW photovoltaic plant.

Iberdrola has expanded its presence in Italy with its first 23 MW photovoltaic installation in Montalto di Castro, Lazio. The company aims to triple its Italian project portfolio by 2025. Upon completion, the facility will power over 12,000 homes and reduce CO_{2} emissions by 9,600 tons annually.

The company is also developing a resilient and dynamic pipeline of new projects with a balanced mix of mature wind, solar, and storage projects in Greece, with plans to install significant additional capacity by 2025.

Fernando Pessoa Solar Farm is a renewable energy project in Santiago do Cacém, Portugal. The farm consists of over 100,000 solar panels spanning across 100 hectares of land. The project has a capacity of 25 MW and generates enough electricity to power over 10,000 homes.

In 2023 the company installed more than 4,500 MW of solar energy capacity. Among its plans for growth in clean energy, solar photovoltaic technology will receive 24% of the investments for renewables in the company's strategic plan, allowing installed solar capacity to increase by 6,300 MW.

The company's major solar energy projects include:

- Cedillo photovoltaic project (Spain) – with 250,000 solar panels located in the municipalities of Majada Alta and San Antonio, these plants produce 156,000 megawatt hours (MWh) of electricity per year, enabling the distribution of clean energy to more than 45,000 households.
- Núñez de Balboa (Spain) – one of the biggest photovoltaic plants in Europe with an installed capacity of 500 megawatt peak (MWp), this facility will supply clean energy to 250,000 homes.
- Photovoltaic power stations of Santiago and Hermosillo (Mexico) – Iberdrola's largest photovoltaic power station. Located in Mexico and commissioned in 2018, it has 660,000 photovoltaic modules and an installed capacity of 170 MW, generating 460 GWh per year. It is capable of supplying electricity to 138,000 households.
- Lund Hill photovoltaic plant (United States) – photovoltaic plant located in Klickitat, Washington, USA. It has an installed capacity of 194 MW.
- Francisco Pizarro photovoltaic plant (Spain) – has an installed capacity of 590 MWp, and supplies clean energy to 334,400 homes.

==== Green hydrogen ====
===== Geographical presence =====
Green hydrogen is produced by breaking down water using electrolysis powered by renewable energy sources. Iberdrola has 60 green hydrogen projects in eight countries – The USA, Mexico, Brazil, UK, Spain, Portugal, Italy and Australia – for electrification and decarbonisation in industry and heavy transport sectors:

- In Spain, Iberdrola has a solid footprint with two operational plants in Puertollano, in collaboration with Fertiberia, and in Barcelona with TMB. Furthermore, they are exploring the potentials of green H2, ammonia, and methanol in ongoing ventures.
- In the UK, the company laid out a roadmap with three significant green hydrogen projects. The Felixstowe project, set to produce 100 MW, is focusing on port operations. The Whitelee project, with a 10 MW capacity, targets mobility, while the Cromarty initiative, boasting a 29 MW capacity, serves the whisky industry.
- In Australia, Iberdrola's green initiatives span Tasmania and the mainland, emphasising the production of green hydrogen, methanol, and ammonia.
- In Brazil, strategic agreements have been inked with key regional authorities and ports, including Estado Rio Grande do Sul, Estado Rio Grande do Norte, Porto Açu, and Ceará, aiming to cultivate the growth of Green H2 and its derivatives.
- In Portugal, Iberdrola's approach leans toward evaluating the viability of projects surrounding green steel and green ammonia.
- In the US, the company is diversifying its green hydrogen efforts, undertaking projects suitable for both mobility and the industrial sector in six states. Texas will soon host a green ammonia plant.
- Iberdrola, in collaboration with AECOM, Ancitel Energia e Ambiente, and Cinque International, is advancing a green hydrogen project in Italy to rejuvenate areas impacted by earthquakes from 2009 to 2017. The initiative includes the development of the "Two Seas Railway", aiming to introduce green hydrogen-powered into Roman trains.
- In Mexico, the company signed an agreement with the Mexican government to develop a hydrogen production plant in the state of Veracruz, which will use renewable energy sources to produce green hydrogen. This project is part of Iberdrola's effort to promote clean energy and reduce carbon emissions in Mexico.

Among the company's major green hydrogen projects is Puertollano (Spain) – the largest plant producing green hydrogen for industrial use in Europe, with a production capacity of more than 200,000 tonnes/year. It comprises a 100-MW solar photovoltaic plant, a lithium-ion battery system with a storage capacity of 20 MWh and one of the world's largest hydrogen production systems using electrolysis (20 MW) from fully renewable sources. The operation of this plant allows avoiding emissions equivalent to 48,000 tCO2/year.

In Barcelona, Iberdrola also has the first commercial renewable hydrogen production and filling facility in Spain, which is used by Transports Metropolitans de Barcelona (TMB) buses and other fleets and industries in the Zona Franca industrial estate, where it is located.

In May 2021, the company started a joint project with Cummins regarding the 500MW-per-year facility hydrogen electrolyser gigafactory in Spain, in the central region of Castilla-La Mancha, near Madrid.

Iberdrola together with H2 Green Steel in December 2021 announced €2.3 billion Green hydrogen venture, a 1GW plant to produce and feed Green Hydrogen to a 2-million-tonne direct reduction tower, enabling Green Steel production with a reduction of CO_{2} emissions by 95 percent. In May 2022, the company partnered with low-carbon development firm Storegga to develop, build and operate green hydrogen production plants across Scotland. The first project is the Cromarty Hydrogen Project, located north of Inverness and designed to deliver up to 20 tonnes of green hydrogen per day.

In July 2022, Iberdrola began working with BP to create a joint venture for large-scale (6GW) green hydrogen production in Spain, Portugal and the UK, as well as the production of clean ammonia and methanol.

==== Data Center ====
The company has announced in 2024 the launch of a subsidiary specialized in Data Centres: CPD4Green which aims to be Europe's largest hub for data centers and AI processing.

=== Hydroelectric energy ===
With a global installed capacity exceeding 14,000 MW, the company supports this form of power generation. It has facilities in the US, Brazil, Spain.

Tâmega hydroelectric complex project involves the construction of three power plants: Gouvães, Daivões, and Alto Tâmega with installed capacity totalling 1,158 MW.

Iberdrola España has a presence in eight hydroelectric plants and three mini-hydroelectric plants in the basin of the Douro River, the largest hydrographic basin in the peninsula, as it passes through Castile and León. More than 2,069 MW of installed capacity with the capacity to offer sustainable energy to almost one and a half million families, with the Aldeadávila dam and the Saucelle dam being the most important producers.

Iberdrola manages multiple hydroelectric facilities in Brazil, such as the Sobradinho Dam in Bahia with a 1,050 MW capacity and the Baixo Iguaçu Hydroelectric Plant on the Iguaçu River, spanning the states of Paraná and Santa Catarina. Additionally, the company oversees the 180 MW Salto Caxias Hydroelectric Plant in Santa Catarina, the 192 MW Garibaldi Hydroelectric Plant, and the Machadinho Hydroelectric Plant, which harnesses the Pelotas River's power between Santa Catarina and Rio Grande do Sul to produce 1,140 MW.

In the US, Avangrid Hydroenergy, a subsidiary of Avangrid, Inc., operates several hydroelectric facilities across the country, with the capacity to generate a significant amount of clean, renewable energy. For instance, in Maine, Avangrid Hydroenergy operates the Forest City Hydroelectric Facility, which has a capacity of 23.5 MW, providing power to approximately 15,000 households annually. In New Hampshire, the company operates the Bear Swamp Hydroelectric Facility, capable of generating 600 MW of electricity, enough to power around 250,000 homes. Additionally, in Connecticut, Avangrid Hydroenergy operates the Shepaug Hydroelectric Facility, which has a capacity of 10 MW, supplying power to thousands of households.

Tâmega Hydroelectric Complex (Portugal) is a project in the north of Portugal, which includes three new dams and hydroelectric plants: Gouvães, Daivões, and Alto Tâmega.

Baixo Iguaçu Hydroelectric Plant (Brazil) is a project located in Paraná state. This plant helps supply energy to thousands of Brazilian homes and reinforces the company's commitment to renewable energy in the country, with installed capacity of over 350 MW and supplies renewable energy to one million people.

The Aldeadávila Hydroelectric Power Station (Spain) is a plant located in the canyon of the lower section of the river Duero as it flows through the province of Salamanca, in the area known as the Arribes del Duero Natural Park. This infrastructure is one of the largest electricity generators in Spain, as its production accounts for more than 8.5% of the country's average hydroelectric generation, enough to supply 733,000 homes.

Iberdrola produces 14,716 GWh of hydroelectric power worldwide. Hydroelectric energy is essential for the energy transition, and is a leader in energy storage with a capacity of 4,000 MW installed through pumped hydroelectric plants.

=== Smart grids ===
==== Geographical presence ====
The company operates one of the world's largest distribution systems, with 1.2 million kilometres of distribution and transmission lines worldwide. The Networks area of the Iberdrola Group is in charge of the construction, operation and maintenance of smart grids, power lines, substations, transformation centres and other infrastructures to transfer electricity from the production centres to the end user.

Iberdrola is involved in the construction of an undersea power transmission highway between Scotland and north-east England.

The electric power line connecting the states of Minas Gerais and São Paulo, with a length of more than 1,700 kilometres, is Iberdrola's largest grid project worldwide.

As of 2023, Iberdrola operates one of the largest electricity distribution systems in the world: 1.2 million kilometres of power lines, 4,500 substations and 1.6 million transformers, which distribute electricity to 34.40 million points around the world.

Iberdrola has also created the Global Smart Grids Innovation Hub (GSGIH), a global centre for innovation in smart grids. This technology hub is sponsored by Iberdrola and the Provincial Council of Bizkaia. It is involved in research and development in new materials and technologies to reduce the environmental impact of electrical installations, equipment to facilitate the integration of renewable energies and boost the deployment of electric vehicles, power electronics and energy storage systems, digitalisation of the distribution grid supported by the telecommunications systems, energy savings and efficiency based on demand management and reduction of losses from the grid.

In 2024, Iberdrola acquired the British electricity distributor Electricity North West (ENW) for EUR 5,000 million, becoming the second largest electricity network operator in the United Kingdom. As a result of this purchase, Iberdrola's regulated assets in networks in the country reach EUR 14 billion.

== Main subsidiaries ==
=== Iberdrola España, S.A.U. ===
Iberdrola España, S.A.U. is Iberdrola group's subholding company in Spain, which operates through its subsidiaries: Iberdrola Energía Sostenible España, S.A.U., i-DE Redes Eléctricas Inteligentes, S.A.U. and Iberdrola Energía España, S.A.U. Iberdrola España, S.A.U. was founded in 1989 and is headquartered in Bilbao, Spain. The subsidiary operates in Spain and carries out the deregulated activities of electricity generation electric power, and natural gas retailing.

=== ScottishPower ===
ScottishPower was formed in 1990, in preparation for the privatisation of the previously state-owned Scottish electricity industry the following year. The company is the distribution network operator for Central and Southern Scotland, Merseyside, North Wales, and parts of Cheshire and Shropshire. It is also the transmission owner for the south of Scotland. The UK's 4th largest energy provider, ScottishPower has 3.6 million supply points across the country with 15,377 GWh of distributed energy in the first half of 2023. It operates in the United Kingdom with Scottish Power Retail Holdings Ltd. (SPRH), Scottish Power Energy Networks Holdings Ltd (SPENHL) and ScottishPower Renewable Energy Ltd (SPREL) subsidiaries.

It focuses on wind energy and smart grids, and has a distribution network covering 65,000 km of underground cables and 47,000 km of overhead lines. ScottishPower is involved in smart grid projects in Glasgow and Liverpool, and provides charging points as a member of the Glasgow consortium which is developing an electric vehicles project. The installed capacity in the United Kingdom has reached 6,342 MW and production has been 19,936 GWh in 2013.

=== Avangrid ===
Avangrid (Iberdrola USA), which became part of the group in September 2008. In 2015 Iberdrola USA merged with UIL Holdings (parent of Connecticut's United Illuminating and other companies) to become Iberdrola-controlled Avangrid. It distributes electricity and gas to 3.3 million electricity customers and 930,000 natural gas customers. It is headquartered in Orange, Connecticut (CT), operates in 25 states and has two lines of business: Avangrid Networks and Avangrid Renewables.

Avangrid Networks manages eight electricity, natural gas and combination utilities Avangrid Renewables owns and operates renewable energy generation facilities across the United States.

Avangrid promotes important infrastructure projects in both Maine and New York. In Maine, CMP began construction in September 2010 of the Maine Power Reliability Program (MPRP), a $1.4 billion upgrade of the state's transmission network which will also improve grid connections to Canada. It also began the roll-out of a smart meter installation plan for 625,000 customers in Maine. In New York, important infrastructure projects have been undertaken at Ithaca and Corning Valley. In 2024, Iberdrola reaches an agreement to purchase the remaining 18.4% of its US subsidiary, it did not control in Avangrid for USD 2,551 million.

=== Neoenergia, S.A. ===
Neoenergia is the Iberdrola Group's subholding company operating in Brazil, founded in 1997. Its shares are listed in the Brazilian stock exchange, and it comprises interests in the companies of distribution, generation, renewable energy, transmission, and electricity retail businesses operating in Brazil.

Neoenergia is present in 18 states and manages 13.9 million supply points in a concession area of around 840,000 km^{2}.

=== Iberdrola Mexico, SA de CV ===
Iberdrola México, S.A. de C.V. is a subholding company of Iberdrola in Mexico, founded in 2000. Iberdrola México operates through two head of business companies: Iberdrola Generación México, S.A. de C.V. and Iberdrola Renovables México, S.A. de C.V. Iberdrola México is responsible for defining and implementing the Group's strategy in Mexico. The companies provides electricity and gas services to residential, commercial, and industrial customers across the country. Iberdrola Mexico operates in several states, including Mexico City, State of Mexico, Guadalajara, and Monterrey.

=== Iberdrola Energía Internacional, S.A.U. ===
Iberdrola Energía Internacional, S.A.U. is a subholding company that operates outside Spain, United Kingdom, United States of America, Brazil and Mexico. Its area of operation includes the generation, transmission, and distribution of electricity, as well as the provision of energy services.

== Assets in Spain ==
Iberdrola's total installed capacity in Spain is 29,816 MW as of 2023, of which 20,598 MW are from renewables, 3,186 MW from nuclear, 5,695 MW CCGT and 347 MW cogeneration.

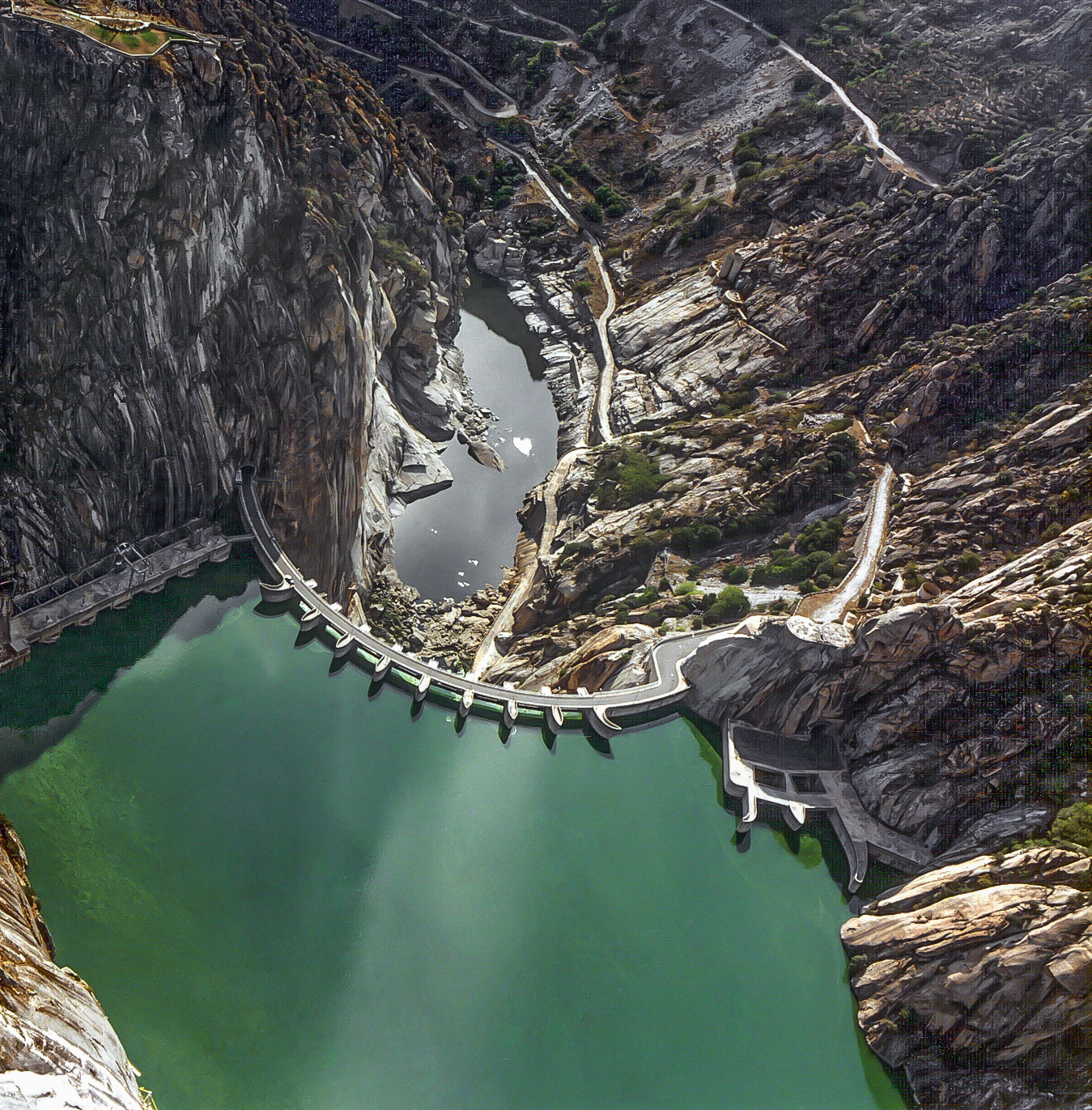
Aldeadávila Dam (Salamanca)

=== Renewables ===
==== Onshore wind ====
Iberdrola has around 190 onshore wind facilities with a 6,446 MW of installed capacity in more than 30 locations across Spain.

The company's major onshore wind energy project in Spain is El Escudo wind farm, 105 MW onshore wind farm able to supply clean energy to 95,350 homes.

==== Hydroelectric ====
Iberdrola also owns hydroelectric plants with a total installed capacity of 10,700 MW, especially in the Duero river basin (provided by Iberduero) and the Tajo and Segura river basins. (provided by Hidroeléctrica Española). The company has 86 facilities in 16 locations across Spain.

In 2013 construction was finished on the 848 MW La Muela plant (at Cortes de Pallás, Valencia) – one of Europe's largest pumped-storage hydropower plants that generates 5,000 GWh (18,000 TJ) annually; as well as Santo Estevo hydroelectric complex (175 MW) on the river Sil, and the San Pedro II project.

The company's major hydroelectric projects in Spain include:

- Tâmega hydroelectric complex – three new power plants: Gouvães, Daivões and Alto Tâmega on the Tâmega river, with a total installed capacity of 1158 MW.
- Cortes-La Muela hydroelectric power plant in the province of Valencia, Valencia region, with an installed capacity of 1720 MW.
- Aldeadávila hydroelectric power station, in the province of Salamanca Castilla y León, with 1275 MW of installed capacity.
- José María Oriol-Alcántara II hydroelectric power station, in the province of Cáceres, Extremadura, with 915 MW of installed capacity.
- Villarino hydroelectric power station, in the province of Salamanca, Castilla y León, with 810 MW of installed capacity.
- Saucelle hydroelectric plant, in the province of Salamanca, with 525 MW of installed capacity.

=== Solar ===
Iberdrola's solar energy production in Spain includes 37 facilities in 15 locations with a total installed capacity of 3,186 MW.

The company's major solar energy projects include:

- Cedillo photovoltaic project – 250,000 solar panels producing 156,000 MWh of electricity per year.
- Núñez de Balboa – one of the biggest photovoltaic plants in Europe with an installed capacity of 500 MW.
- Francisco Pizarro – the largest solar power plant in Europe, with a capacity of 590 MW.

=== Wind-solar ===
In 2023, the company built the first hybrid wind and solar complex in Spain, in the province of Burgos. It constructed two photovoltaic (PV) plants of 41MW and 33MW respectively, which will have more than 170,000 modules.

=== Green Hydrogen ===
The company's major green hydrogen projects include:

Puertollano – largest plant producing green hydrogen for industrial use in Europe with a production capacity of more than 200,000 t/year.

=== Combined cycle plants ===
- C. T. de Castejón 2, in Castejón (Navarre), with 386 MW.
- C. T. de Castellón, in Castellón, with two units with a combined 1,650 MW.
- C. T. de Santurce, in Santurce (Vizcaya), with 402 MW.
- C. T. Tarragona Power, in Tarragona, with 424 MW.
- C. T. de Arcos de la Frontera, in Arcos de la Frontera (Cádiz), with two groups with a combined 1,613 MW.
- C. T. Bahía de Bizkaia, in Ciérvana (Vizcaya), which is operated jointly with three other operators (EVE, Repsol YPF and BP with 25% each), of 780 MW.
- C. T. de Aceca, in Villaseca de la Sagra (Toledo), of 391 MW.
- C. T. de Escombreras, in Cartagena (Murcia), with 831 MW.

=== Nuclear plants ===
Iberdrola operates the following five nuclear plants individually or jointly with other companies:

- Almaraz Nuclear Power Plant (1983/1984)
- Trillo Nuclear Power Plant (1988)
- Cofrentes Nuclear Power Plant (1984)
- Vandellòs II (1988)
- Ascó II (1986)

== Assets worldwide ==
Iberdrola has various power plants worldwide, with a considerable focus on renewable energies, especially wind and hydroelectric power. There are the most notable power plants and renewable installations:

- Wikinger Offshore Wind Farm (Germany): located in the Baltic Sea. With 70 wind turbines, it can produce up to 350 MW.
- Whitelee Wind Farm (Scotland): the largest onshore wind farm in the UK, Whitelee has a capacity of 539 MW.
- East Anglia One Offshore Wind Farm (UK): located off the coast of Suffolk, this is one of the world's largest wind farms, with a total capacity of approximately 714 MW.
- Tâmega Complex (Portugal): this major hydroelectric project consists of three plants and will have a total installed capacity of over 1,158 MW upon completion.
- Rocha Candeias Hydro Plant (Brazil): an essential hydroelectric plant in Iberdrola's South American portfolio.
- Baixo Iguaçu Hydroelectric Power Plant (Brazil): another significant hydroelectric facility in Brazil, with a capacity of 350 MW.
- Cenace Wind Farm (Mexico): part of Iberdrola's extensive operations in Mexico, this wind farm has a capacity of over 100 MW.
- Saint Brieuc (France): the main project is the Saint-Brieuc offshore wind farm, due to open in 2024, with 496 MW of installed capacity.
- Fernando de Noronha (Brazil): Iberdrola has been developing the Noronha Verde project since November 2025. It features a photovoltaic plant with more than 30,000 panels and a capacity of 22 MWp, which will be integrated with a 49 MWh battery storage system.

== Renewable energy ==
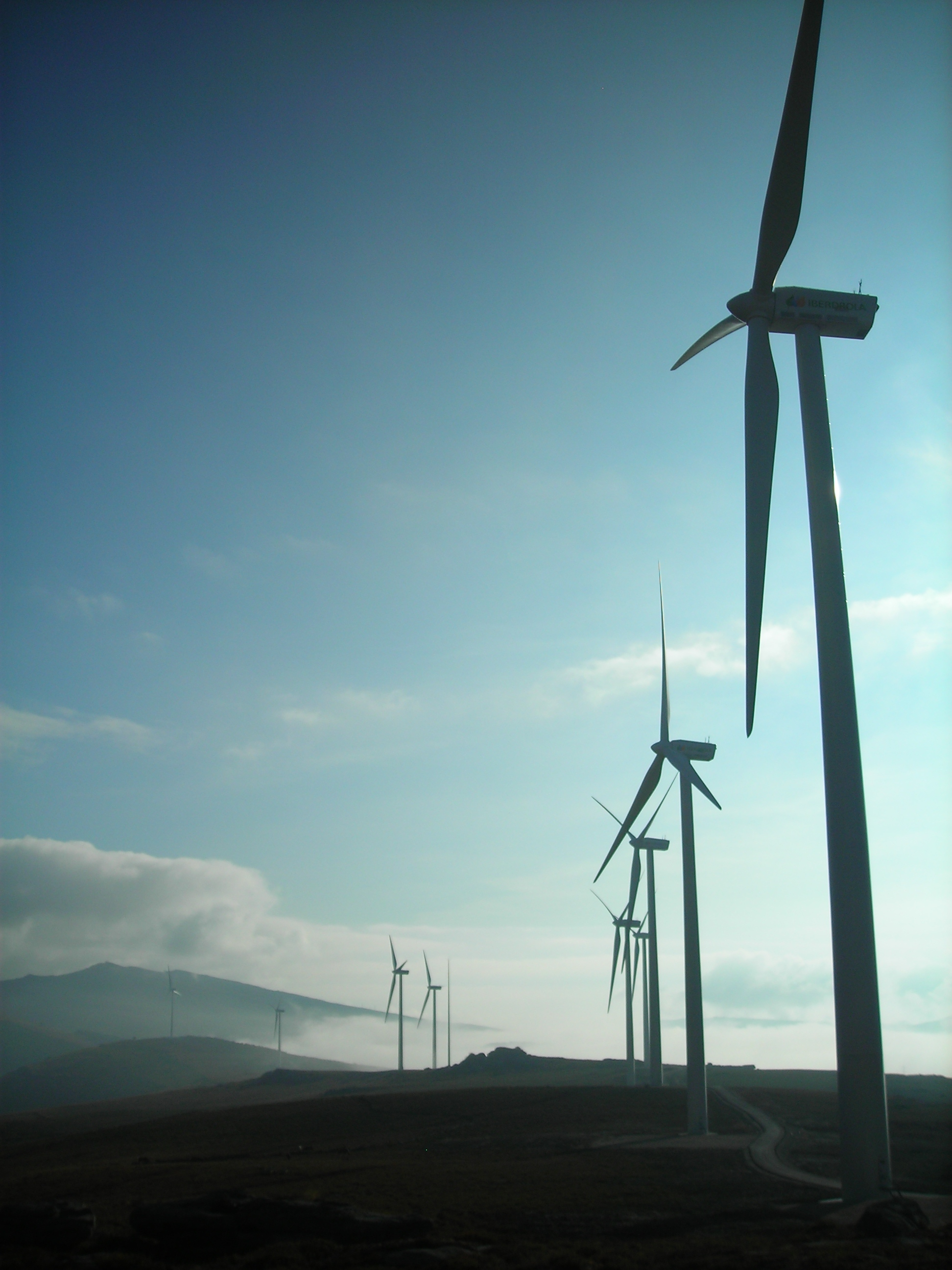
Iberdrola wind generators in the Park La Cotera (Burgos)

Headquartered in Valencia (Paseo de la Alameda), the Iberdrola Renovables subsidiary had been listed on the stock exchange from December 2007 until July 2011, when Iberdrola decided to re-acquire the minority shares and integrate it into the parent company.

In Q1 2023, Iberdrola reported having operating installed capacity of 62,045MW of which 41,246 MW is renewable. Its clean energy capacity increased by 5.7% compared to 2022.

Iberdrola increased its investments in renewables with 8% and has 7,100 MW of renewable energy under construction. It plans to build 52,000 MW until 2025.

Major assets

- Renewable Energy Operations Centres – CORE (Toledo, Portland and Glasgow). Iberdrola's Renewable Energy Operations Centres (CORE for its initials in Spanish) in Toledo, Portland and Glasgow control all Iberdrola's renewables facilities and its related substations worldwide. Iberdrola's first CORE was set up in Toledo in 2003, with the other two coming on stream since.
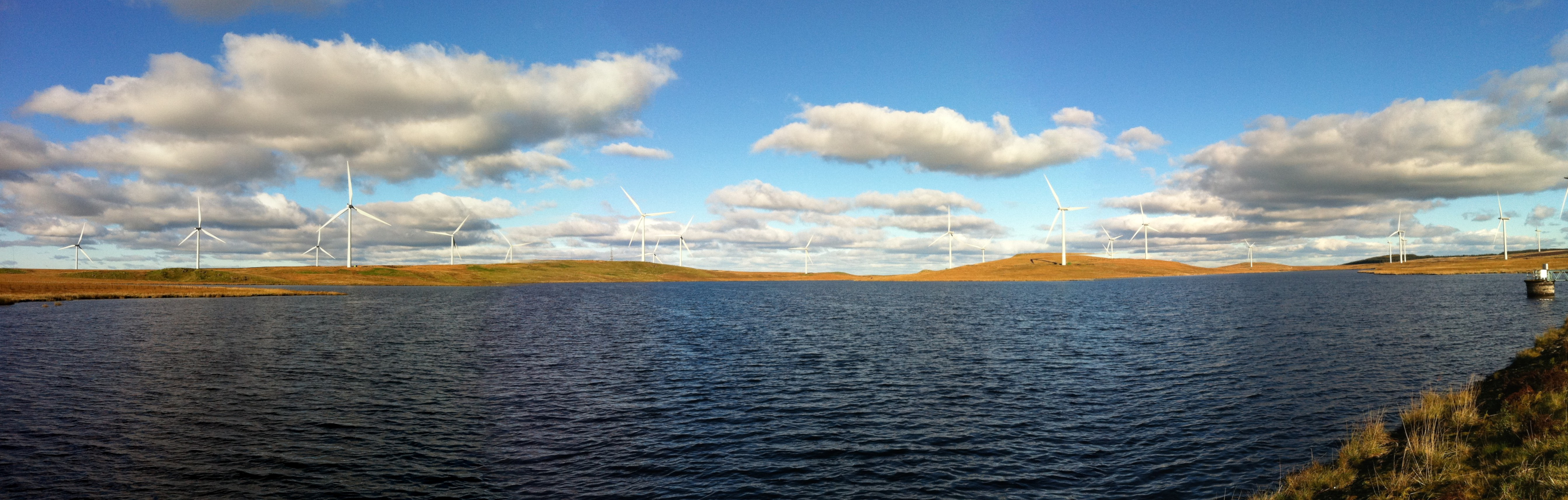
- Whitelee wind farm Glasgow
  The Whitelee Wind Farm (Glasgow, Scotland). With initial installed capacity of 322 MW, it is currently being enlarged to 539 MW. The complex is situated south of Glasgow and covers an area of 55 square kilometres, the same as that occupied by Glasgow itself.
- The El Andévalo wind farm (Huelva, Spain). The El Andévalo wind farm, which was commissioned in 2010, is the largest wind power facility in Spain and continental Europe. It has installed capacity of 292 MW and is located between the towns of El Almendro, Alosno, San Silvestre and Puebla de Guzmán in the south of Huelva province. To transfer the power generated by these wind farms and connect them to the transmission grid, Iberdrola has built a new 120-kilometre line between Spain and Portugal, which means this complex occupies a key strategic position in the power interconnections between the two countries.
- Peñascal Wind Power Project (Texas, US). The Peñascal wind farm is the largest facility operated by the company worldwide, with installed capacity of 404 MW. Located in Kennedy County, Texas, its innovative features include a radar that detects the arrival of large flocks of migratory birds and shuts down the turbines if visibility conditions represent a danger.
- Núñez de Balboa solar plant (Badajoz Province, Spain). The 500-megawatt Núñez de Balboa photovoltaic facility entered its testing phase in January 2020.

Commissioned in April 2020.

== Public activities ==
In 2006 Iberdrola founded the Corporate Volunteering Program, a global initiative aimed at supporting Iberdrola's employees in their participation in social projects in integrating members of vulnerable groups into society, improving the environment and sustainable development.

In 2022, more than 16,800 volunteers participated in the Corporate Volunteering Programme delivering help to more than half a million people. Some of its projects include: Protagonists of their Future (aimed at women victims of gender-based violence and at risk of social exclusion), SUMA (aimed at the return of women to work after a break in their professional career), INVOLVE (International Volunteering Vacation for Education, within which Iberdrola employees help vulnerable teenagers to improve their employability through computer science and web applications), Lights... and Action! (a project carried out since 2011 with the Tomillo Foundation aimed at improving the training and employability of young people who study basic vocational training for teenagers with experiences of school failure), The Job Ambassadors Programme (volunteers have participated in the training of people from the Multiple Sclerosis Foundation (EMF) who are seeking employment), Environmental Volunteering (Forest Restoration on International Forest Day, with 1,100 trees planted through various initiatives in which people with intellectual and school disabilities have also participated), initiatives to encourage scientific vocation and equal opportunities on International Women's and Girls' Day in Science and on Women's Day, World Cancer Day (initiatives to raise awareness of the importance of supporting research and hair donation for vulnerable, underprivileged women), International Happiness Day (1,600 meals distributed to vulnerable families), SDGs at school (a school awareness project on SDGs) I Can (a project that prepares people with intellectual disabilities to secure and keep a job and lead an independent life). Through Iberdrola with Refugees volunteer initiative founded in 2015, it has assisted to a thousand refugees from Syria, Palestine, Afghanistan and Mali in adapting, integrating and improving their autonomy.

In 2022, after the beginning of Russian invasion of Ukraine, Iberdrola's Corporate Volunteering Program involved 12,000 people in the Volunteers for Ukraine programme to collaborate in helping Ukrainian people, including providing shelter, warm clothes, mattresses, blankets, water and food for the people who were leaving Ukraine. The company has sent eight tonnes of humanitarian aid donated by its employees in Spain to Ukraine in March 2022. The company also raised funds, doubling the amounts donated by its employees for the United Nations High Commissioner for Refugees (UNHCR) to provide shelter, immediate food and emergency care.

Also in 2022, Iberdrola guaranteed gas and power supply for five months to customers in Spain who were deemed vulnerable by the humanitarian group the Red Cross. The company also provided the ability to spread out payments over 12 months at no extra cost. Residential customers also received help in paying their bills over longer periods if the Red Cross assessed their circumstances and considers that they were vulnerable.

In February 2022, Ignacio Galán, the Chairman of Iberdrola, together with businessmen from the European Round Table for Industry (ERT), the President of France Emmanuel Macron, the German Chancellor, Olaf Scholz and the President of the European Commission, Ursula Von der Leyen, held a meeting in Paris to address the Russian aggression against Ukraine and to promote ways for peace in Europe.

== Sports sponsorships ==
Iberdrola serves as an Equality Partner for the Spanish Olympic Committee and supports both the Olympic and Paralympic. The company supports Spanish sports for more than two decades through global agreements with the Spanish Higher Sports Council (Consejo Superior de Deportes – CSD) and the Spanish Olympic and Paralympic Committees (COE and CPE), as well as with various sports federations. The company has been a sponsor of the Spanish Paralympic Team since its inception in 2005, contributing to the Paralympic Objective Sport Support (ADOP) plan. The ADOP plan comprises a Scholarship Programme aimed at granting athletes financial assistance alongside a Services Program encompassing a comprehensive training support system with access to advanced training facilities, medical care, and more.

The company promotes 32 National Federations (including the National Federations of Athletics, Badminton, Handball, Boxing, Ice Sports, Fencing, Football, Gymnastics, Hockey, Karate, Canoeing, Rugby, Surfing, Table Tennis, Triathlon and Volleyball, to which in 2018 were added Underwater Activities, Bowling, Winter Sports, Weightlifting, Judo, Olympic Wrestling, Mountaineering and Climbing, Swimming, Skating, Ball, Rowing, Squash, Taekwondo, Tennis, Archery and Sailing), and has more than 100 competitions with the naming right Iberdrola, including 32 leagues. Iberdrola supports sailing, including the Iberdrola Sailing Team, achieving notable results in national and international competitions. Since 2016, Iberdrola has been promoting and sponsoring women's sport in Spain, supporting 600,000 federated women. In 2016, Iberdrola became the main promoter of the Universo Mujer (Women Universe) programme of the National Sports Council.

Iberdrola signed a sponsorship agreement with The Royal Spanish Football Federation (RFEF) as a main sponsor of the Spain national football team in 2009–2010 season. During the company's sponsorship, the National Team won the 2010 World Cup.

In August 2016, Iberdrola became the main promoter of women's football in Spain under an agreement with the Federation of Universo Mujer and as of 2023, the company is the main sponsor of the Spain women's national football team, the Under-19 and Under-17 national teams, the First Division of Women's Football – the Primera Iberdrola, as well as the Copa de La Reina-Iberdrola and Supercopa-Iberdrola, among others.

In August 2023, during the Iberdrola's sponsorship, Spanish Women's National Team won the world championship in Australia and New Zealand.

Iberdrola also promotes women's football in Brazil and Scotland. Iberdrola's subsidiary Neoenergia became first dedicated sponsor of Brazilian women's football when it signed an agreement with Brazilian Football Confederation (CBF) in 2021. Other Iberdrola's subsidiary ScottishPower is a sponsor of women and girls football in Scotland. It has agreed a three-year partnership and sponsorship deal with Scottish Women's Football (SWF) and the Scottish Women's Premier League (SWPL) to support women's football at every age and stage, and becoming the exclusive Principal Partner for Scottish Women's Football and the Scottish Women's Premier League, sponsoring the Scottish Youth Challenge Cups at all three age groups as well as the Scottish Women's Highlands and Islands League.

== See also ==
- Jose Ignacio Sanchez Galan
- Wind power in Spain
- María Antonia Herrero
