= Connecticut Natural Gas =

American natural gas distribution company

Connecticut Natural Gas Corporation
- Type: Subsidiary of Avangrid
- Industry: Natural Gas
- Predecessor: Hartford City Light
- Headquarters: East Hartford, Connecticut, United States
- Area served: Greater Hartford and Greater Greenwich, Connecticut
- Key people: James P. Torgerson, President & CEO of UIL Holdings Corporation

Connecticut Natural Gas (CNG) is a natural gas distribution company that delivers natural gas and energy services to residential, commercial, and industrial customers in the Greater Hartford area and Greenwich, Connecticut areas. CNG is a subsidiary of UIL Holdings Corporation, headquartered in New Haven, Connecticut.

CNG's service territory in Connecticut includes the cities of Hartford and New Britain, Connecticut, as well as the communities of Avon, Berlin, Bloomfield, Canton, East Hartford, Farmington, Glastonbury, Manchester, Newington, Rocky Hill, Simsbury, Unionville, West Hartford, Wethersfield and Windsor in Hartford County; Hebron and Mansfield in Tolland County; Portland in Middlesex County and Greenwich in lower Fairfield County.

The relocation of CNG's headquarters from Adriaen's Landing to East Hartford cost $37 million which was paid for by the state. The move was controversial because the contractor chosen to do the job (Tomasso Group) had a corrupt relationship with then Governor John G. Rowland, who was overseeing the development of Adriaen's Landing, that eventually cost him his job. Tomasso Group principal Angelo Tomasso Jr. also served on the CNG board at the time.

== Workers union ==
Employees at CNG are represented by Connecticut Independent Utility Workers.
