= Avangrid =

Energy company in the United States

Avangrid, Inc.
- Logo used since 2023. It is based on the Iberdrola logo.
- Type: Wholly-owned subsidiary
- Traded as: NYSE: AGR
- Industry: Energy and Utilities
- Predecessor: Energy East and Iberdrola USA
- Headquarters: Orange, Connecticut, United States
- Area served: New York, New England
- Key people: José Antonio Miranda, CEO
- Services: hydroelectric generation, electric transmission and distribution, natural gas distribution, propane/air distribution, energy services
- Number of employees: 7,000
- Parent: Iberdrola
- Subsidiaries: Avangrid Renewables, Berkshire Gas, Central Maine Power, Connecticut Natural Gas (CNG), Maine Natural Gas, New York State Electric & Gas (NYSEG), Rochester Gas and Electric Corporation (RG&E), Southern Connecticut Gas (SCG), NM Green Holdings INC and United Illuminating (UI)
- Website: www.avangrid.com

Avangrid, Inc. (formerly Energy East and Iberdrola USA), is an energy services and delivery company. Avangrid serves about 3.1 million customers throughout New England and New York in the United States. Its subsidiaries include Central Maine Power, Rochester Gas and Electric (RG&E) and New York State Electric & Gas.

== History ==
In 2008, Iberdrola S.A. purchased Energy East. Iberdrola renamed the company Iberdrola USA.

In November 2010, Iberdrola USA sold its gas distribution companies in Connecticut and Massachusetts, the Southern Connecticut Gas Company, Connecticut Natural Gas Corporation, and the Berkshire Gas Company, to UIL Holdings Corporation.

In 2012, Iberdrola USA sold its energy services companies, Energetix and NYSEG Solutions, to Direct Energy.

In February 2015, Iberdrola USA announced that it had entered into a merger agreement with UIL Holdings Corporation under which UIL Holdings Corporation would merge into a subsidiary of Iberdrola USA, Inc. In December 2015, the acquisition was finalized and the company was rebranded as Avangrid.

In March 2017, Avangrid won the rights to North Carolina's first offshore wind farm with a $9 million bid in a federal auction conducted by the Bureau of Ocean Energy Management (BOEM). The company later divided the lease into North and South portions. In 2024, Avangrid sold the Kitty Hawk North portion to Virginia Electric and Power Company, a subsidiary of Dominion Energy, for $160 million. It retained the rights to develop Kitty Hawk South, which remains in the planning and permitting phase. In 2023, Avangrid requested a federal permitting timetable extension to secure additional paths to market and interconnection options.

Avangrid supports the adoption of electric vehicles. In 2017, Avangrid donated $2 million to the Connecticut Hydrogen and Electric Automobile Purchase Rebate program. The program was launched in 2015 and gives money in the form of rebates to consumers who purchase zero-emissions vehicles, which includes electric vehicles. The company also installed electric vehicle charging stations at several of its facilities. In 2018, Avangrid held an "electric vehicle fair" for its employees, with the goal of enabling these employees, if they so chose, to purchase electric vehicles.

In 2021, Avangrid's subsidiary, Central Maine Power Company (CMP), was fined $360,000 for violating for violating industry testing standards intended to maintain electrical stability and prevent outages.

In 2024, Iberdrola reached an agreement to purchase the remaining 18.4% stake in Avangrid that it did not already control for approximately $2.55 billion. The transaction closed in December 2024, making Avangrid a wholly-owned subsidiary of Iberdrola.

Avangrid partnered with Copenhagen Infrastructure Partners to build Vineyard Wind, the second largest offshore wind farm in the United States. The farm began generating electricity in January 2024. In February 2024, Avangrid and Amazon expanded their partnership to source renewable energy with a 98.4 megawatt wind project located in Oregon. That same year, Avangrid partnered with Boston Dynamics to launch a pilot project that uses robots and artificial intelligence to enhance inspections of substations. They also partnered with a rancher in Oregon to launch one of the largest solar grazing operations in the Pacific Northwest.

In 2025, Avangrid installed more than 650 smart devices on power grids in Maine and New York. That same year, CMP filed a proposal for a five-year workforce and grid strengthening initiative with the Maine Public Utilities Commission. As of September 2025, Linda Ball is president and CEO of CMP.

== Subsidiaries ==
- Avangrid Renewables
- Berkshire Gas Company (BGC)
- Central Maine Power (CMP)
- Connecticut Natural Gas (CNG)
- New York State Electric & Gas (NYSEG)
- Rochester Gas and Electric (RG&E)
- Maine Natural Gas (MNG)
- Southern Connecticut Gas (SCG)
- The United Illuminating Company (UI)
