= Ricobayo =

Coordinates: 41°32′05″N 5°59′10″W

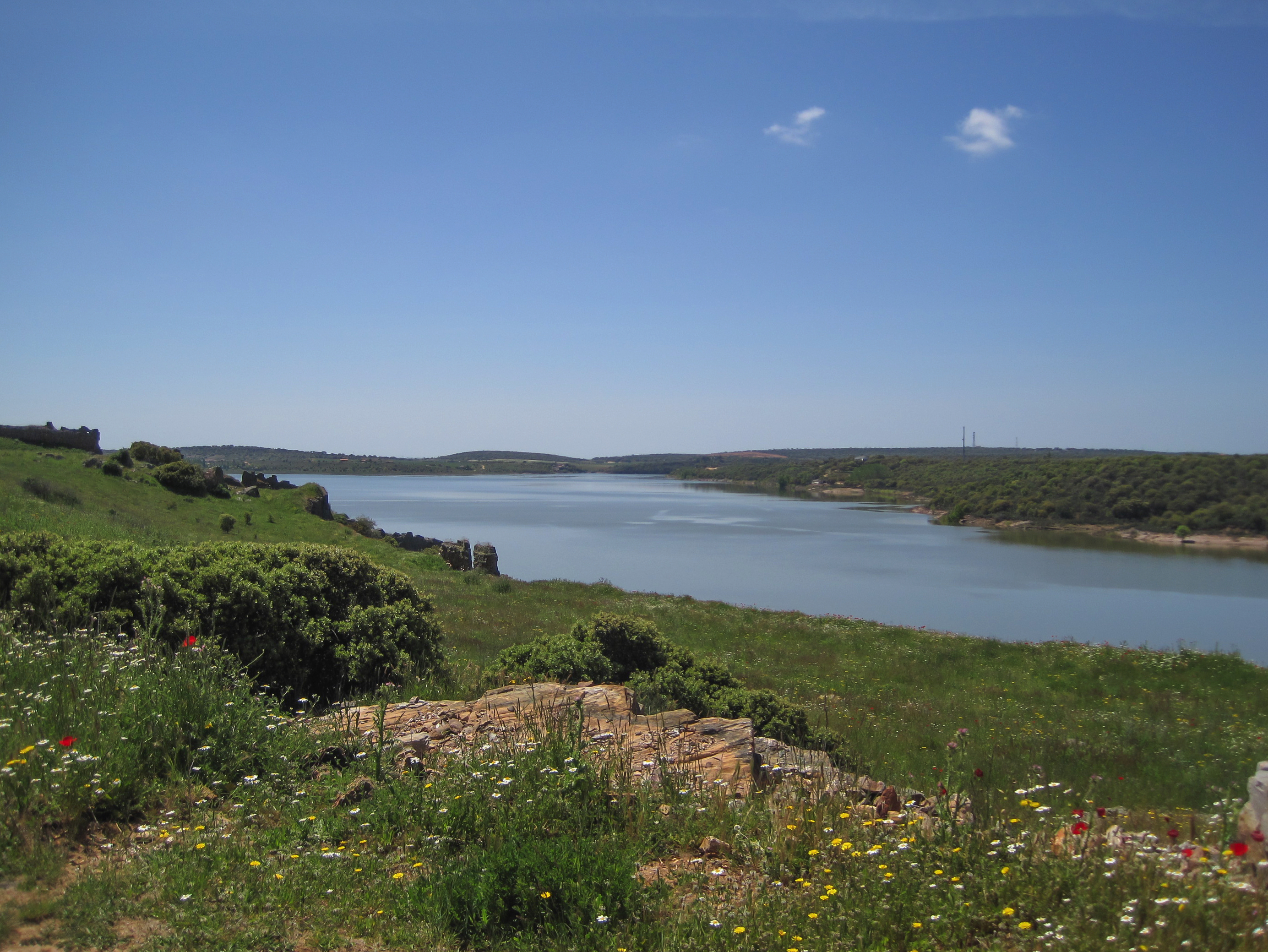
Ricobayo Reservoir

Ricobayo is a locality in the province of Zamora, Spain. Until mid-1964 a municipality in its own right, it is part of Muelas del Pan.

== Bridge ==
Long important as a crossing-point on the River Esla, Ricobayo's original bridge is now under water, having been drowned by the construction of the Ricobayo reservoir. Since the 1990s the main bridge has been the Ricobayo Arch Bridge.

== Dam and reservoir ==
In the 1920s it was agreed to build a gravity dam on the River Esla at Ricobayo. It impounds the Ricobayo Reservoir.

The dam is part of a hydroelectric scheme known as Saltos del Duero. This scheme involves other dams in the catchment area of the Duero such as the Almendra Dam.

As well as electricity generation, Ricobayo Reservoir is used for recreation. In the summer of 2021 the two uses came into conflict, when the reservoir was largely drained by the electric utility company Iberdrola, making Ricobayo less attractive to tourists.
