= ASLA =

ASLA may refer to:

- Academia de Științe, Literatură și Arte, in Romania
- American Society of Landscape Architects
- Asla, Algeria, a municipality in Naâma Province

== See also ==
- Əşlə, a village and municipality in the Lankaran Rayon of Azerbaijan
