= Esla =

Esla or ESLA can refer to:

- Əşlə, Azerbaijani municipality
- Esla river, Spain
- Enterprise South Liverpool Academy, located in Liverpool, England
