= San Pedro de la Nave-Almendra =

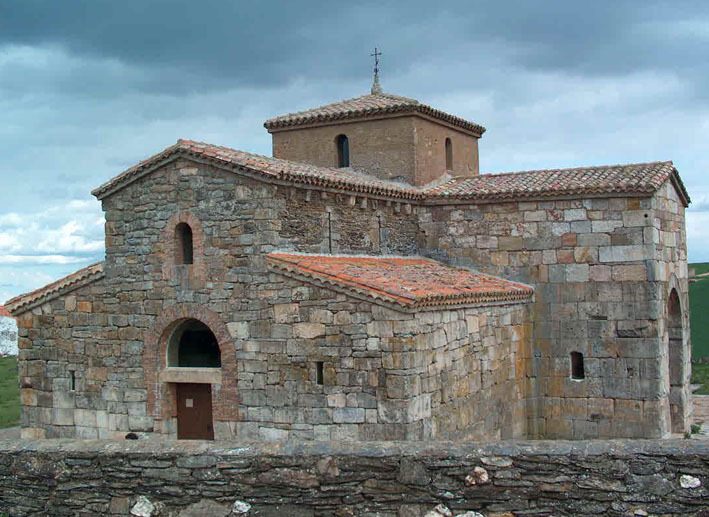

- Location in Spain.
- Coordinates: 41°35′1″N 5°57′43″W
- Country: Spain
- Autonomous community: Castile and León
- Province: Zamora
- Comarca: Tierra del Pan

Government
  - Mayor: Braulio Prieto Macías

Area
  - Total: 22 km^{2} (8.5 sq mi)

Population (2025-01-01)
  - Total: 313
  - Density: 14/km^{2} (37/sq mi)
- Time zone: UTC+1 (CET)
  - Summer (DST): UTC+2 (CEST)

San Pedro de la Nave-Almendra is a municipality located in the province of Zamora, Castile and León, Spain. According to the 2004 census (INE), the municipality has a population of 477 inhabitants.

It is home to the medieval church San Pedro de la Nave, a structure which was relocated when it was threatened by the construction of the Ricobayo reservoir.

== Town hall ==
San Pedro de la Nave-Almendra is home to the town hall of 4 towns:

- San Pedro de la Nave-Almendra (337 inhabitants, INE 2020).
- Almendra (156 inhabitants, INE 2020).
- Valdeperdices (148 inhabitants, INE 2020).
- El Campillo (33 inhabitants, INE 2020).
