= Ricobayo Dam =

Dam in the river Esla, province of Zamora, Castile and León, Spain

Coordinates: 41.5273°N 5.9852°W

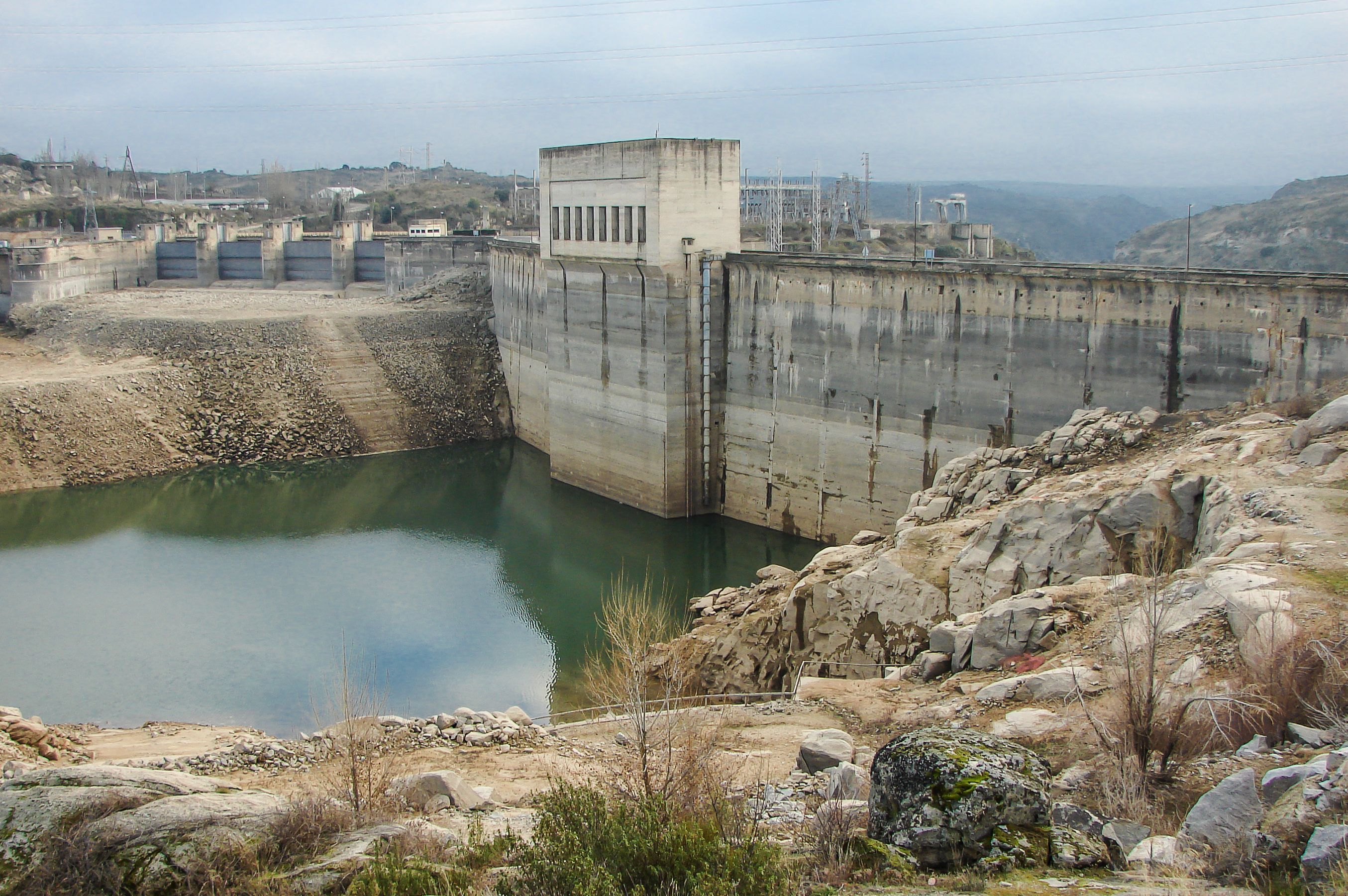
- View of the Ricobayo Dam.
- Official name: Presa de Ricobayo
- Country: Spain
- Location: Zamora, Castile and León
- Purpose: Hydroelectricity
- Status: Operational
- Construction began: 1929
- Opening date: 1935
- Owner(s): Iberdrola

Dam and spillways
- Type of dam: Gravity dam
- Impounds: Esla, Douro
- Height (foundation): 99 m.
- Length: 270 m.

Reservoir
- Creates: Duero river
- Total capacity: 5725 hPa.

Power Station
- Turbines: Ricobayo I: 4 Francis; Ricobayo II: 1 Francis

The Ricobayo Dam (in Spanish: presa de Ricobayo or salto de Ricobayo) is a hydroelectric engineering work built on the lower course of the Esla river. It is located less than 1 km from Ricobayo de Alba, in the province of Zamora, Castilla y León, Spain.

The section in which it is located is known as the arribes of Esla, a deep geographic depression caused by the millenary erosion of the river.

It is part of the Saltos del Duero system together with the infrastructures installed in Aldeadávila, Almendra, Castro, Saucelle and Villalcampo.

== History ==
The first project dates from 1919, although the projected height and capacity of the reservoir were lower. Soon the engineers of the Sociedad Hispano Portuguesa de Transportes Eléctricos realized that the flows of the Esla river were capable of creating the largest reservoir in Europe at that time (1200 hm³) with a large regulating capacity that would allow winter water to be stored. This is why in the Agreement of August 11, 1927, signed between Spain and Portugal to regulate the hydroelectric exploitation of the international section of the Douro River, Article 11 stipulates: "The works to be carried out in Spanish territory, directly aimed at the regulation of the Douro in its international section, referred to in Article 10 of the Royal Decree-Law of August 23, 1926, will begin with the construction, on the Esla River, of the dam called Ricobayo, province of Zamora".

Work began in May 1929. The new Ricobayo Dam will regulate the flow of the Esla River and supply electricity to the north of Spain. It was put into operation in January 1934 with an installed power of 100 MW, which in 1947 will be increased to 133 MW. Notwithstanding the above, the official date of the start of operation is February 4, 1935, which is the date recorded by the Government in official documents.

During the construction of the dam, the village of Salto del Esla was built to house the workers who participated in its construction. Some of these houses are still inhabited.

Its construction led to the stone by stone transfer of the Visigothic temple of San Pedro de la Nave to the town of El Campillo.

It was granted a concession period of 75 years from 1935 when it began to operate, so that in 2010 the infrastructure should be handed over to the State. In 1990, Iberdrola presented a new reform and expansion plan that would add to the existing plant, Ricobayo I, another new plant, Ricobayo II, with 151 MW. With this investment of 7651 million pesetas, the Government extended by 30 years the date on which Iberdrola would have to return the reservoir to the State, in 2040, so that it would enjoy its use for a total of 108 years, until 2040.

However, Decree 1022/1964, of April 15, which approves the articulated text of the State Heritage Law, establishes that no concession can last more than 99 years, so that, regardless of what was agreed at the time by the Government of Felipe González, in any case the State will necessarily and inexcusably regain control of the plant at 00:00 hours on Sunday, February 5, 2034. At that time, the Government will be obliged by law to demolish the existing power plant, having exhausted its useful life, to return the land expropriated at the time to the descendants of its former owners and to restore the natural environment damaged by the reservoir, as established in the regulations currently in force. Under no circumstances will the extension of the concession or the maintenance of the dam be appropriate, since the regional, national and European environmental regulations in force require the demolition of this type of dam at the end of its concession period.

=== Weir problems ===
Its surface weir, about 700 m long and with a 14% slope, caused serious erosion, as the water filtered through a breach, the land sank and the spillway was consumed 350 m upstream, which meant that between 1933 and 1939 half of the mountain was badly eroded, causing a cazuela 100 m wide and 100 m deep, excavating approximately 1,136,000 m^{3} of rocks. The problems of this weir made it necessary in 1943 to build a Hydraulics Laboratory, the first R&D facility of its kind, in the village of Salto del Esla, to solve and study in a reduced model the problems derived from the large evacuations of water from the spillways. German professor Theodor Rehbock advised the Spanish engineers on the preliminary project.

=== 2021 controversy ===
Iberdrola released more than 70% of the water stored in June and July 2021 to produce electricity, which meant a significant damage to the tourist companies in the area that offer activities linked to the reservoir, as their activity was significantly reduced. The controversy spread nationally at a time when the final price of electricity reached historic highs. The Spanish Minister for Ecological Transition, Teresa Ribera, described the maneuver as scandalous.

The price of electricity in the that system was fixed based on the most expensive energy source, at that time gas, at historic highs, so that other energies are paid at the price of gas, including renewable energies such as wind and hydroelectric power, which are much cheaper because they use natural resources. Therefore, the energy produced with the release of water has been paid at a price much higher than the cost of production. This system has been widely criticized because it maximizes the profits of the country's four major power companies.

== Reservoir ==
The Salto de Ricobayo consists of a gravity dam, curved plant, 93 m high and 220 m long, and two power plants: one at the foot of the dam with 133 MW and a subway one, on the right bank, with 150 MW.

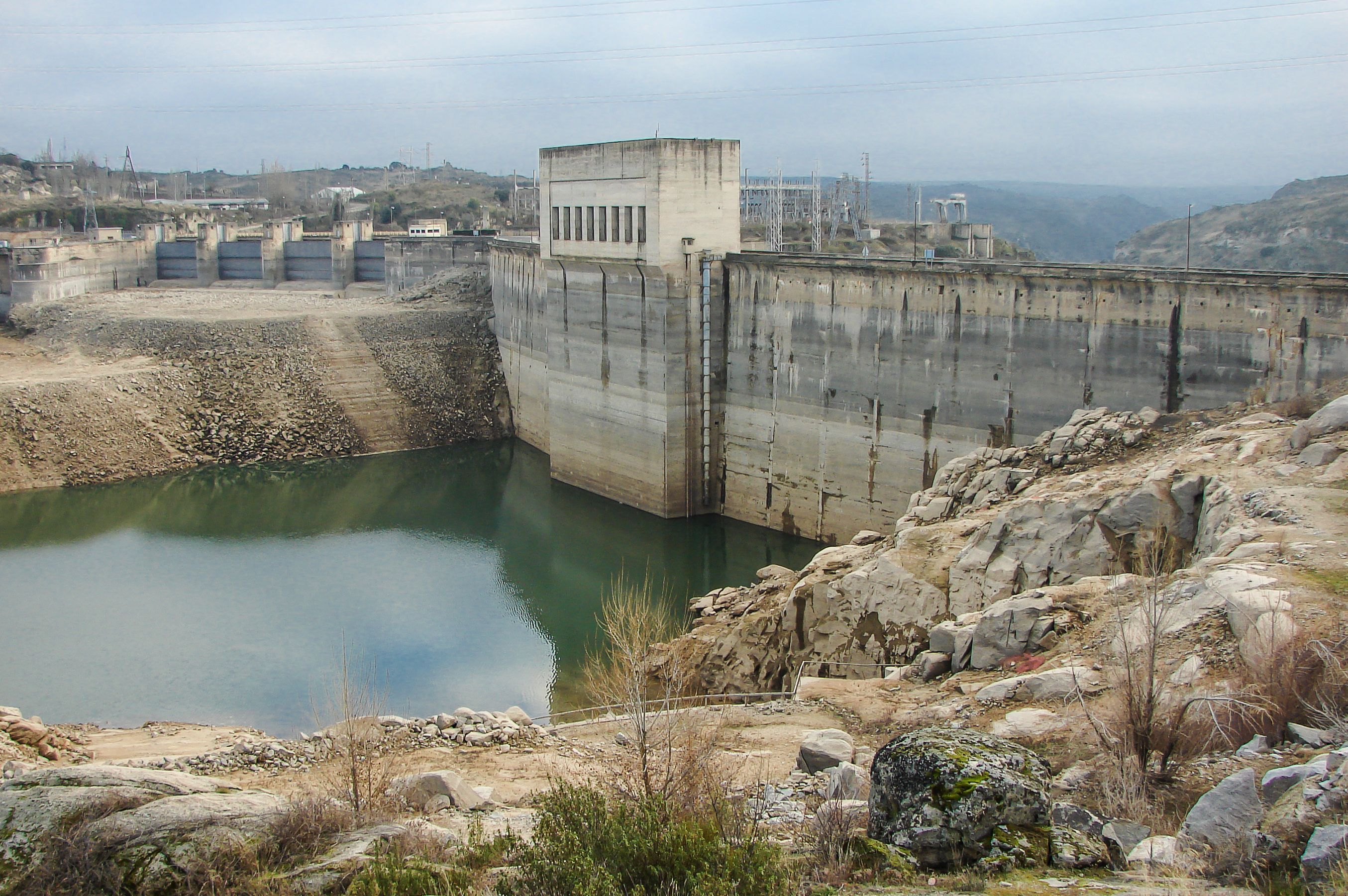
Rear view of the dam.

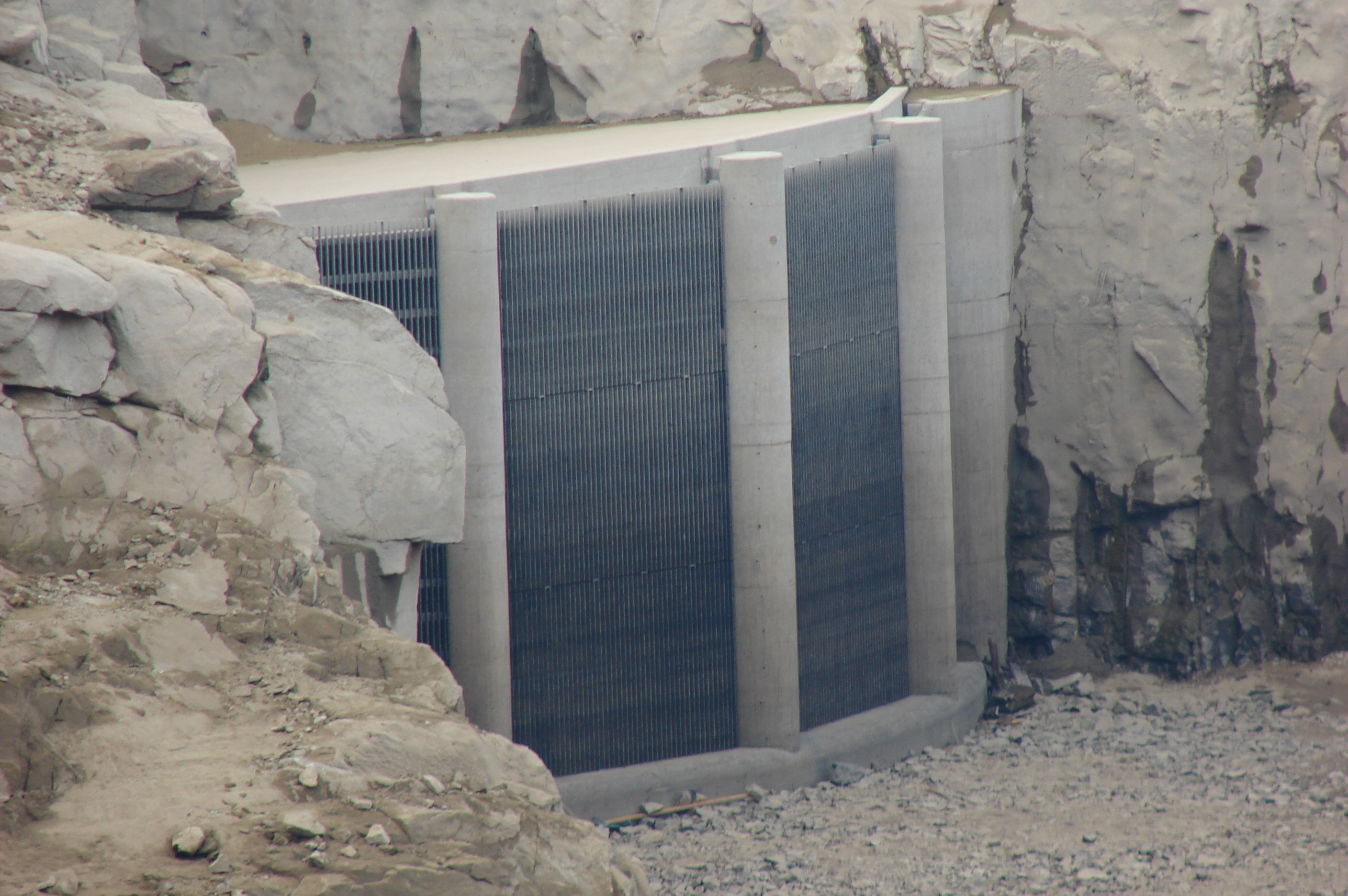
Ricobayo II.

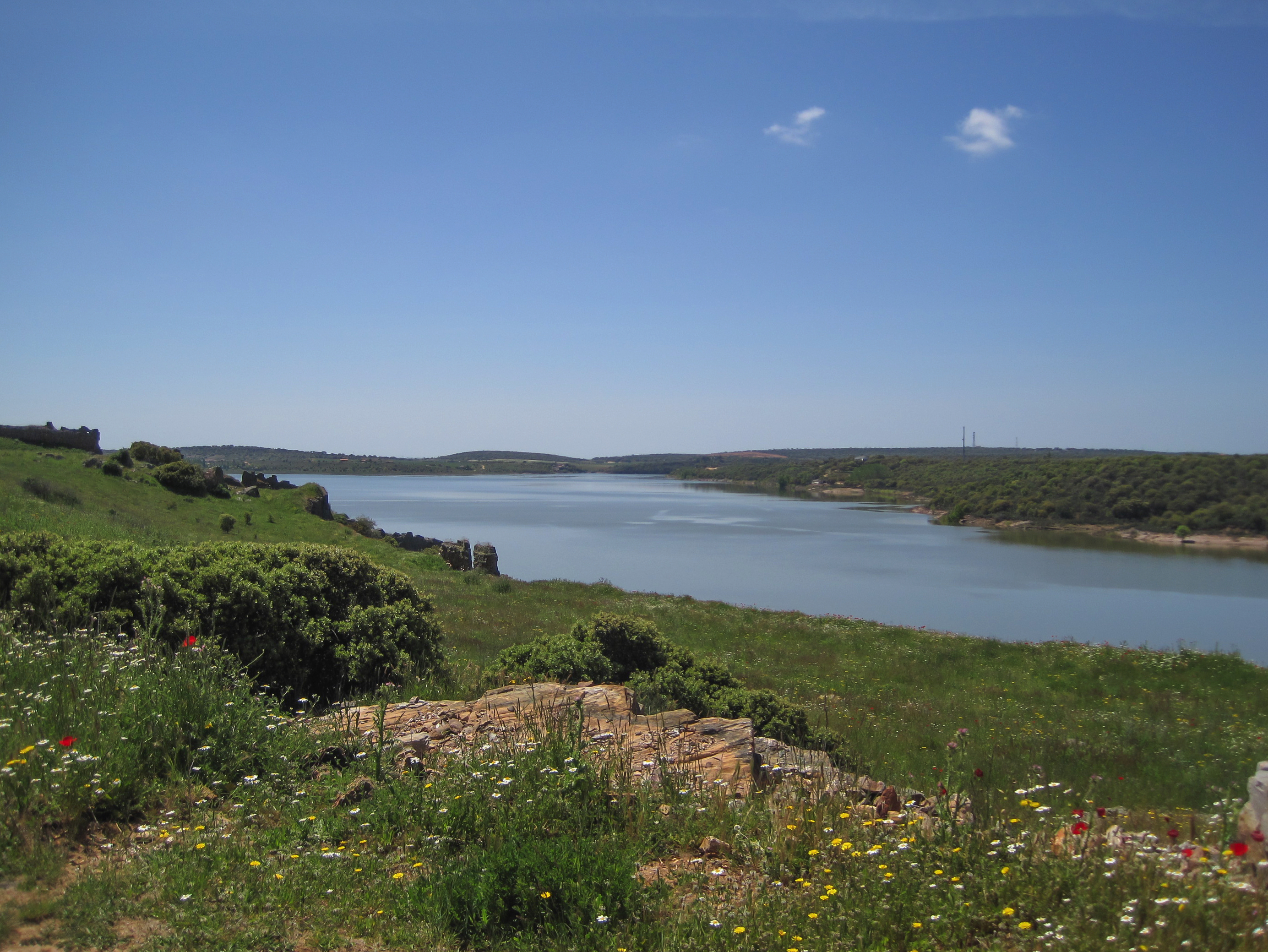
View of the reservoir.

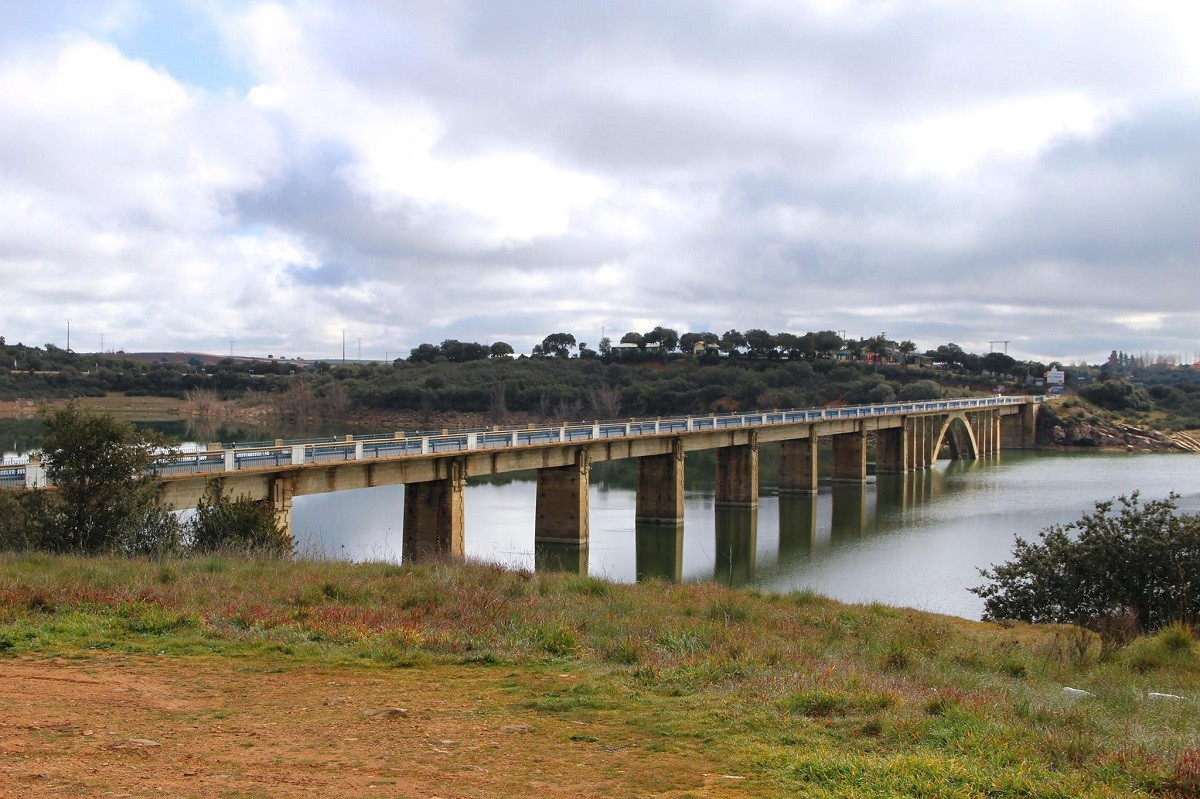
Estrella Bridge, N-631.

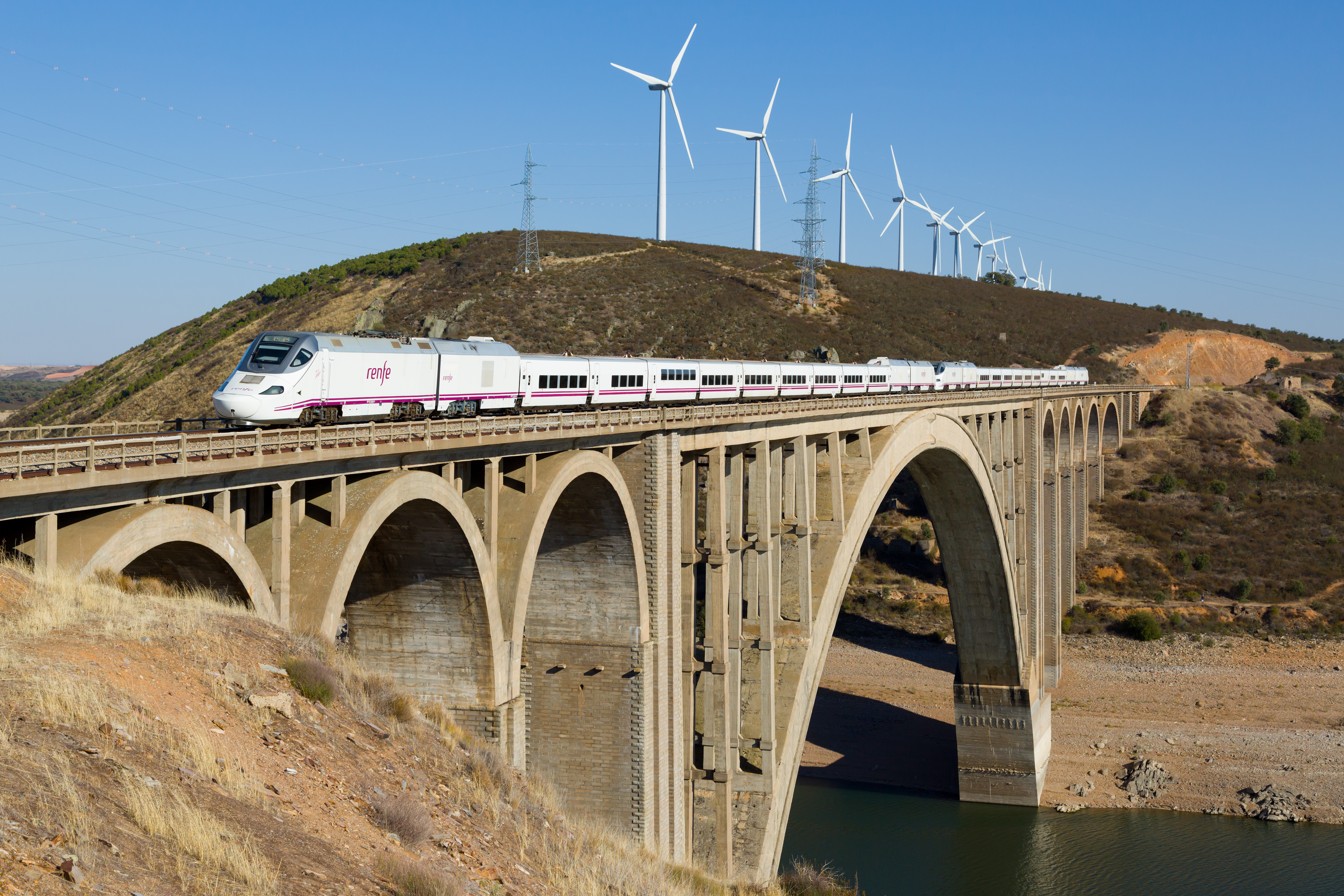
San Pedro de la Nave.

== See also ==
- Arribes del Duero Natural Park
- Douro
- Muelas del Pan
- Esla (river)
- Douro International Natural Park
- Ricobayo
