= San Pedro de la Nave =

Medieval church building in Zamora Province, Spain

Coordinates: 41°34′59.8″N 05°57′51.3″W

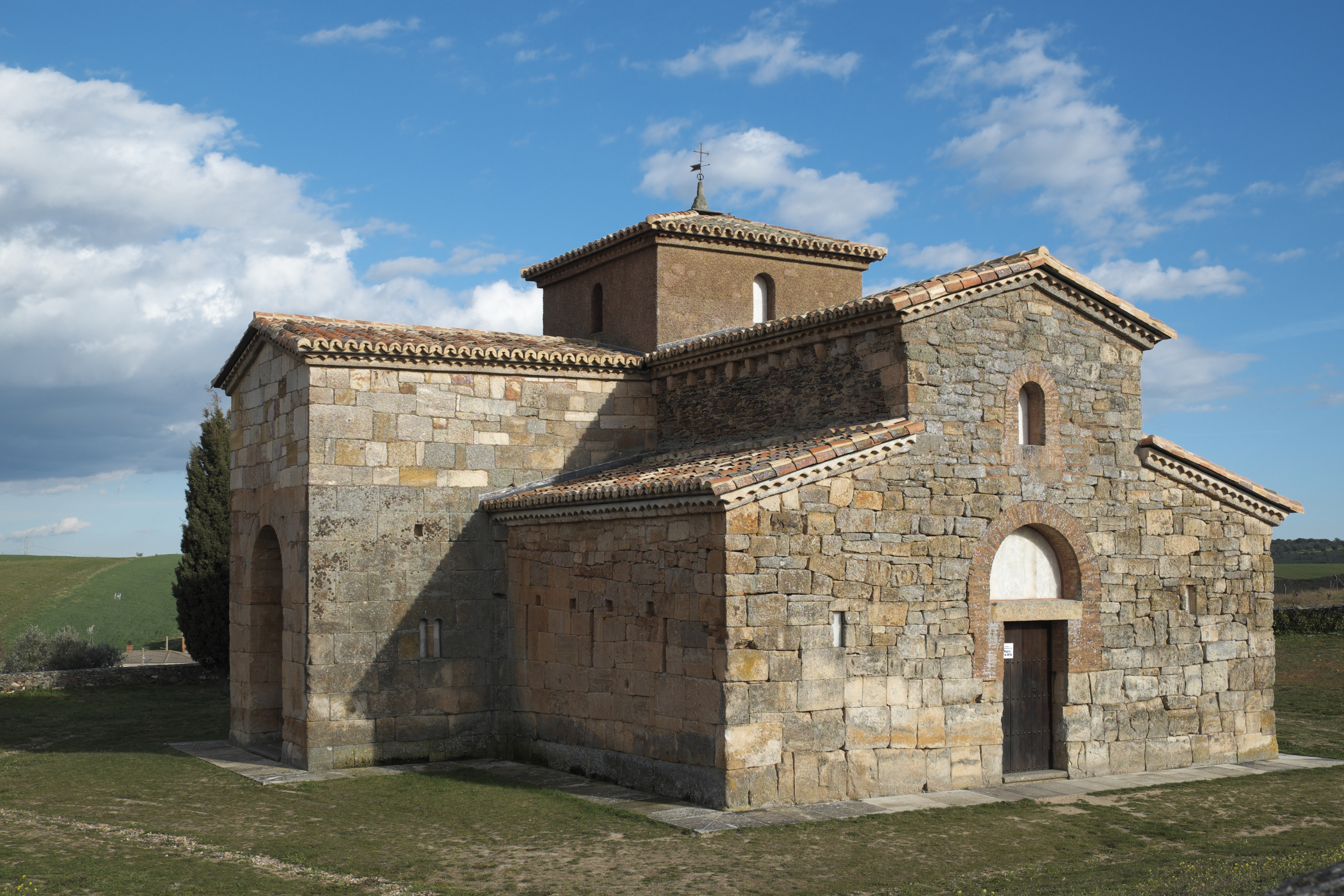
San Pedro de la Nave (Northwest view)

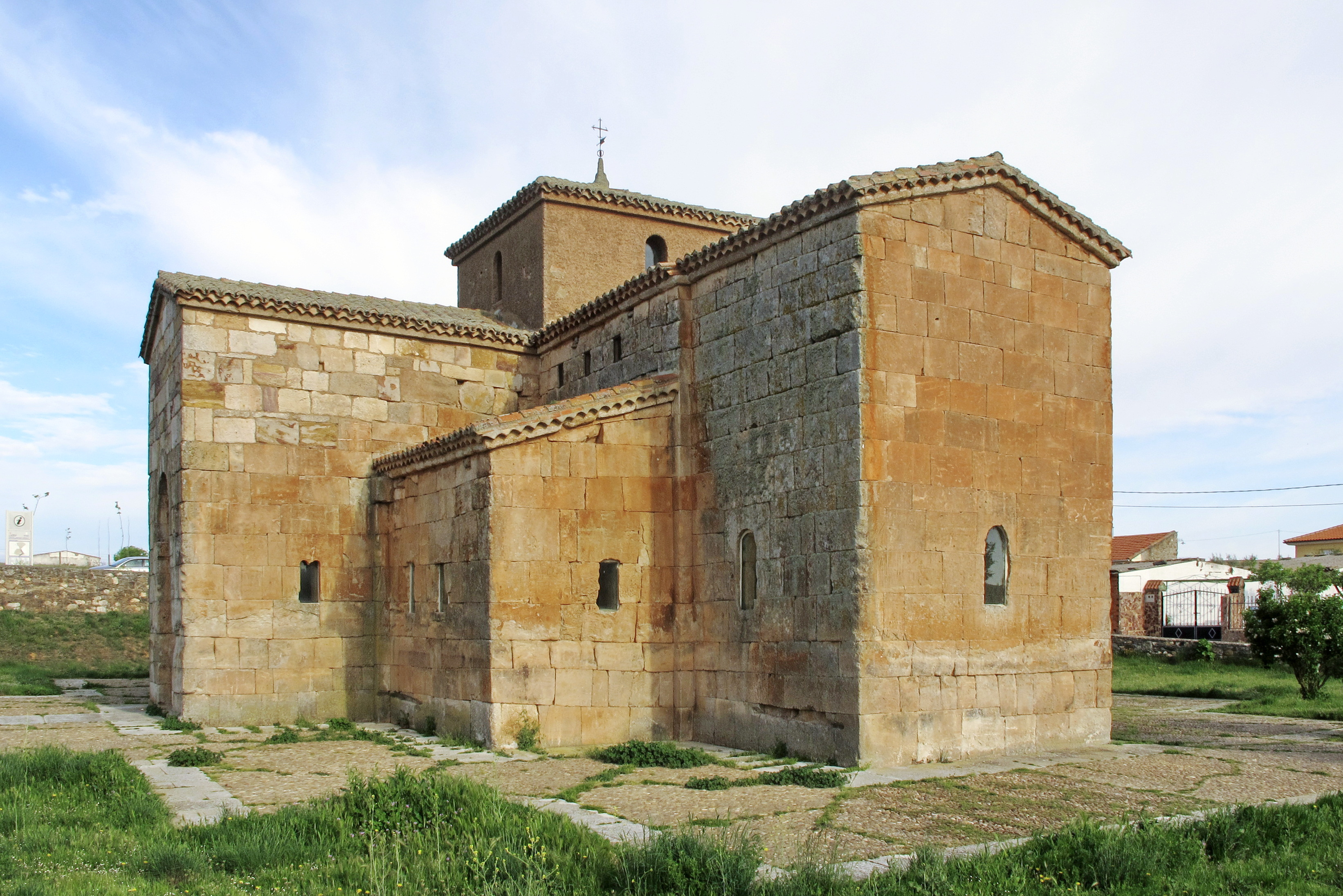
Southeast view

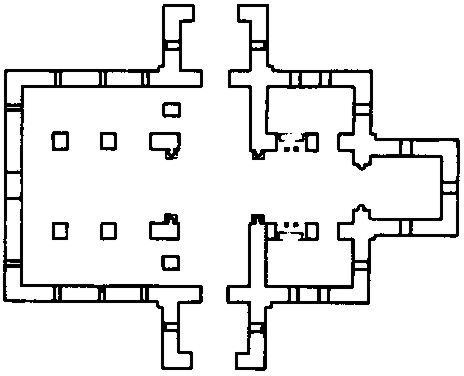
Plan of the church (on window level)

San Pedro de la Nave ("St. Peter of the Nave") is a Visigothic church located in El Campillo, a small village in the municipality of San Pedro de la Nave-Almendra, just under 20 km northwest of the city of Zamora, in the Spanish province of the same name within the autonomous community of Castile and León.

== History ==
San Pedro de la Nave is considered a late example of Visigothic architecture. The church was likely built shortly before the Moorish conquest of Spain, which began in 711. Construction is dated to the reign of the Visigothic King Egica (reigned 687–702)—specifically to the late 7th or early 8th century. The actual construction period is believed to have lasted no more than a year. Originally, the church was part of a monastery in the Esla River valley, near the Vía de la Plata—the Roman road connecting the cities of Emerita Augusta (Mérida) and Asturica Augusta (Astorga). There is no record of how long the monastery remained in existence. The church was later used as a parish church.

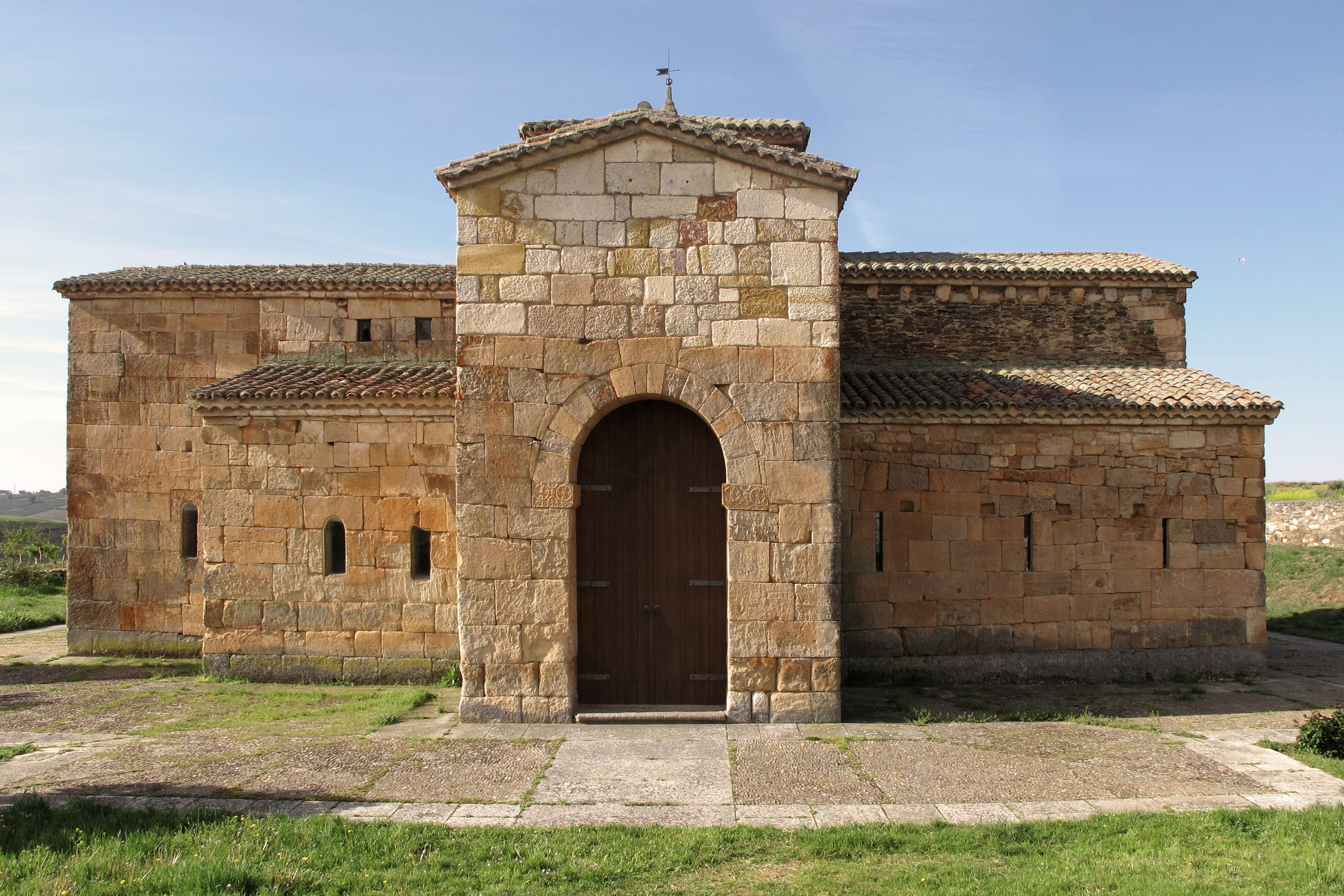
View from north

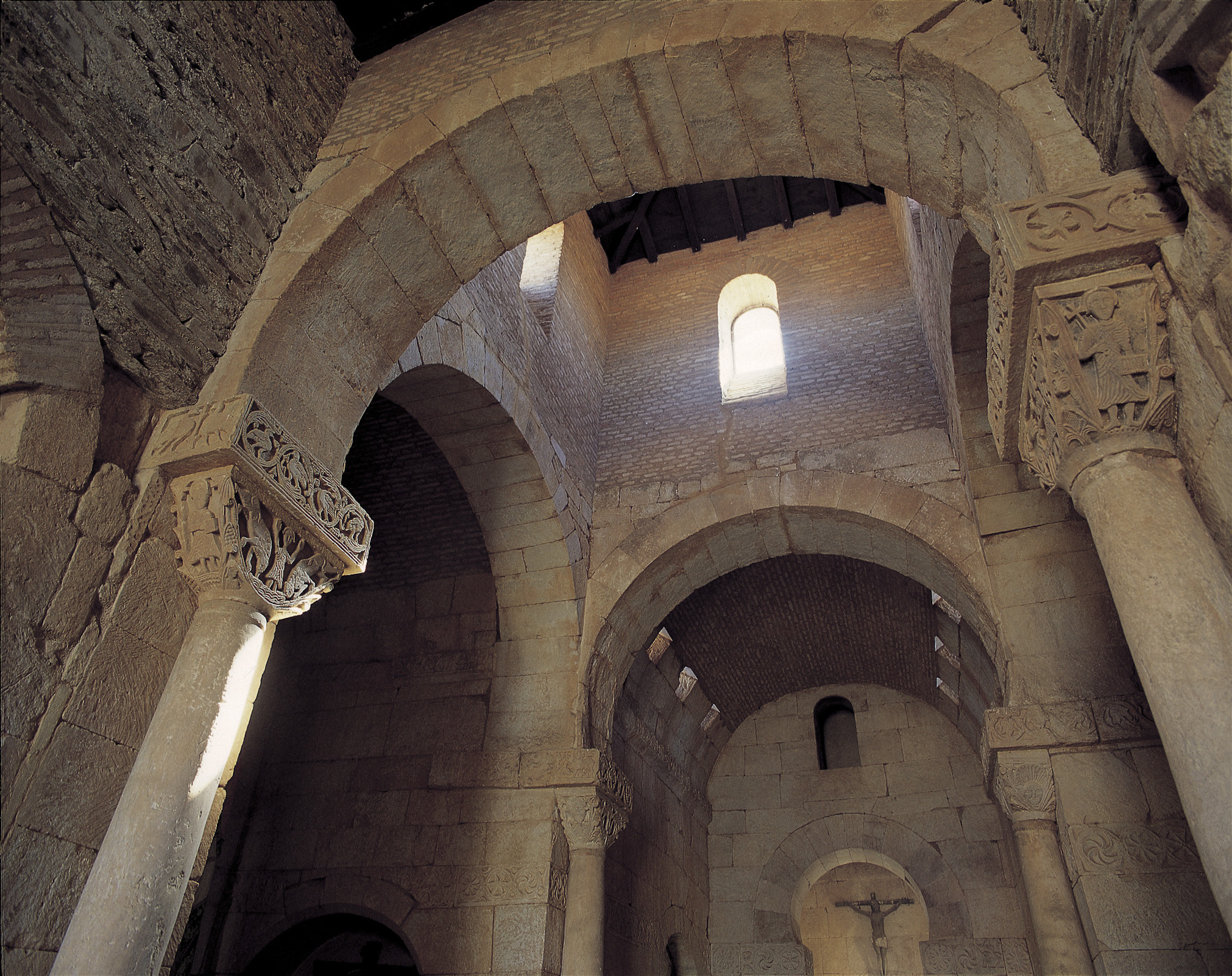
A look into the tower of the crossing

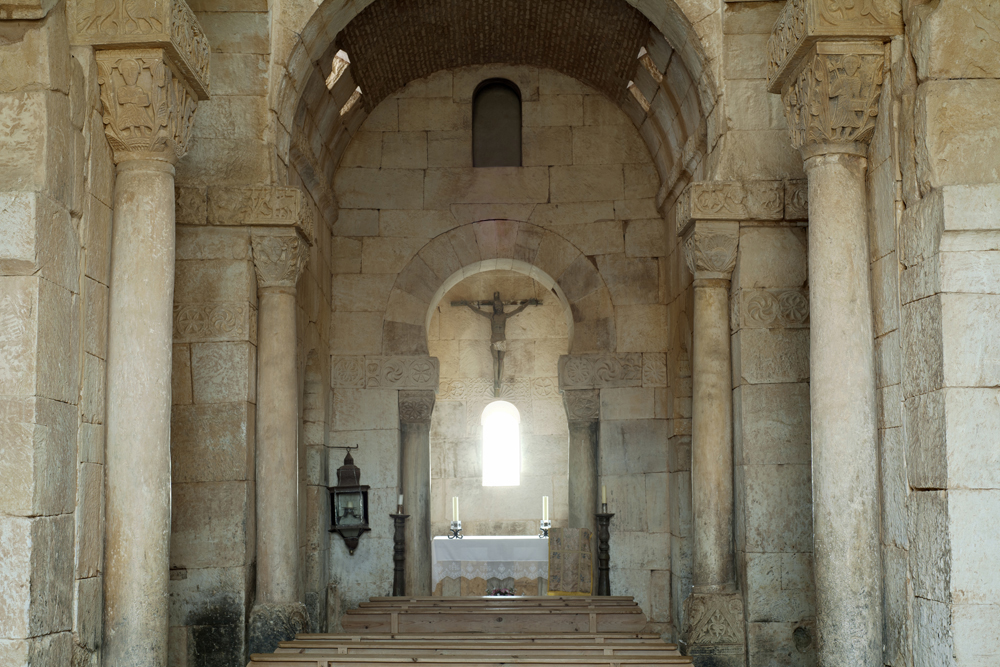
View of the apse

== Conservation ==
In 1912 (April 22), it was designated a national cultural heritage site (Bien de Interés Cultural, RI-51-0000103). In 1931, the church had to make way for the Ricobayo Reservoir and was rebuilt at its current location, approximately two kilometers to the southeast. Thanks to the efforts of Manuel Gómez-Moreno this operation was decided and carried out under the direction of the architect Alejandro Ferrant Vázquez. The renovation of the crossing tower, the cámara oculta, and the lintel above the main portal date from this period.

The building was restored and fitted with a lighting system in the early 2010s and reopened in 2014.

== Architecture ==
Despite the structure's relocation in 1930–31—which resulted in the loss of much potential data—the conscientious documentation of its dismantling and subsequent identical reconstruction in the 1990s allowed for a productive analysis and mapping of the masonry's stratigraphy.

San Pedro de la Nave is a three-aisled basilica featuring projecting rectangular transepts and an almost square chancel apse. Occupying a footprint of 17.7 × 21.10 m—with double-leaf walls approximately 80 cm thick—the interior has a depth of 19.60 m and a maximum width of 16.10 m across the transept arms. The building is constructed from reddish sandstone blocks of varying sizes; these are fitted together without mortar, and almost every course incorporates embedded wooden clamps that span up to three blocks. Harder granite blocks are occasionally used in areas subject to particular stress. The masonry, featuring ashlar blocks measuring up to 1.40 m or even larger, is executed with "extreme precision"; opposing courses of masonry are aligned at the same height, even in the curved sections of the wall. Fabric from the earliest construction phase is distributed throughout the building—most consistently between the transept and the presbytery, and diminishing towards the floor of the nave; only the nave arcades no longer show traces of such an early date. The "homogeneity" of the structure is viewed as evidence that its current form still corresponds to the plan originally implemented. Notable features include the comparatively large portals and the variously designed light openings. The six square clerestory windows beneath the presbytery’s barrel vault—which was restored using brick—are unusual for early medieval structures; they are thought to have been added in 1931 or later, though this is undocumented. The spaces flanking the presbytery—which externally extend the line of the side aisles beyond the transept—are connected to it by a doorway with an oversized arch and a triforium. The windows in these spaces (two on each long side, one in the east wall) and the three windows in the apse were always fitted with grilles. The light shafts of the side aisles (three along the length, one facing west in each case) widen conically towards the interior to maximize both protection and the intake of light. A window divided by a central column (an ajimez) opens in the east wall of the northern transept. The capital of this rudimentary column—carved from a single stone—is adorned with a relief of a grapevine, a motif that dominates the interior decoration.

A low tower with a flat pyramidal roof rises above the crossing, illuminating the interior through four window openings. The crossing piers are flanked on the side facing the nave by columns whose capitals and bases feature relief ornamentation. The imposts projecting from them support a frieze (see Sculptural Decoration below).

The side aisles connect to the nave and transepts via arcades of horseshoe arches—varying in the degree of their curvature—with two opening onto the nave and two passing through the western transept walls. The triumphal arch opening from the presbytery to the apse is also designed as a horseshoe arch. Above it lies a so-called "hidden chamber" (cámara oculta)—a feature found in other pre-Romanesque churches (such as San Baudelio de Berlanga, San Salvador de Priesca, or Santiago de Peñalba)—which is accessible only from the interior via a ladder. It was reconstructed in 1931.

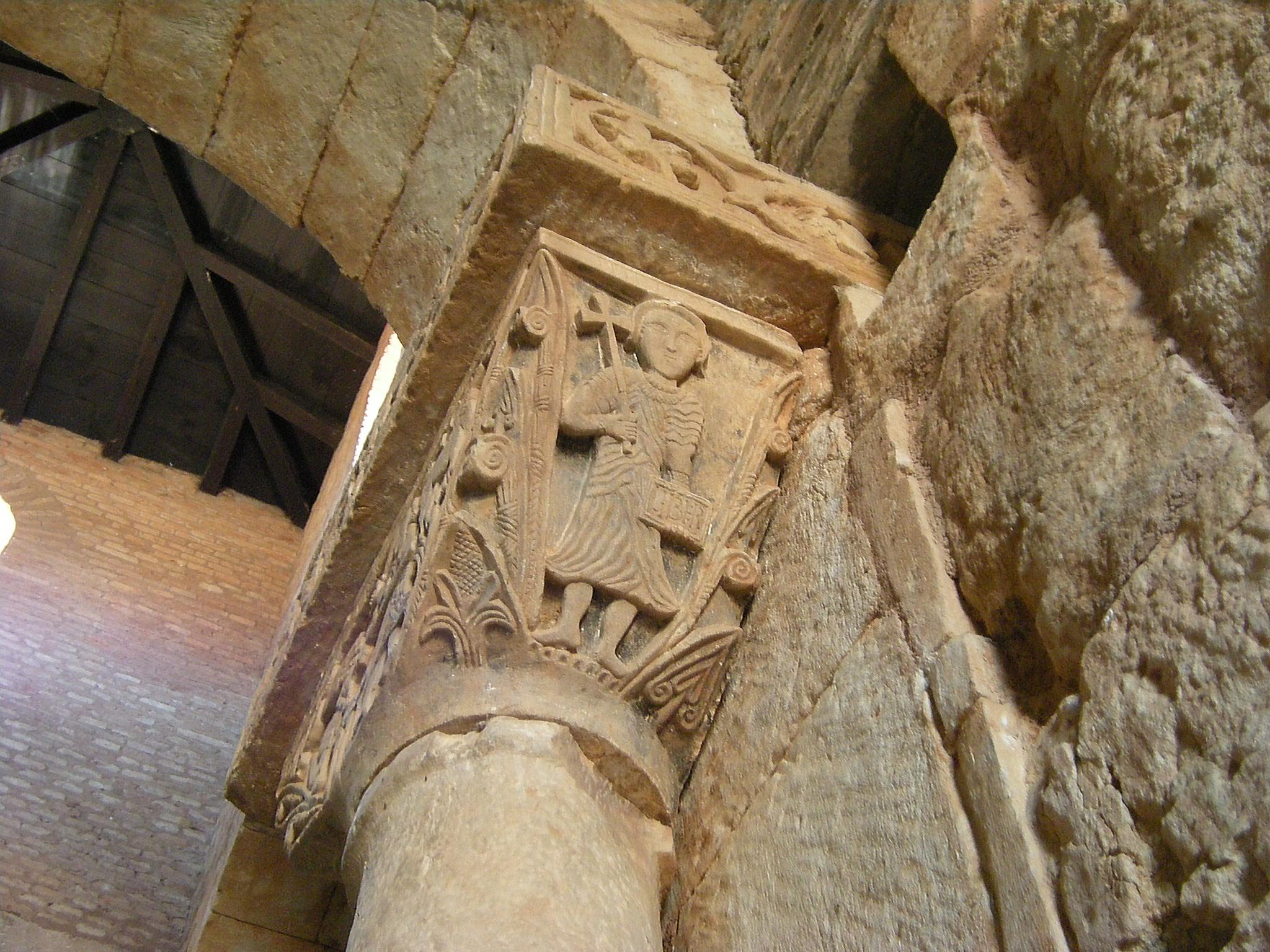
Southwest capitalmwith Paul holding a cross and a book (reading: LIBER, Latin, "book")

== Sculptural Decoration ==
=== Relief Decoration ===
Columns with elongated rectangular capitals, adorned with figurative reliefs, are set against the piers of the crossing square. The capitals facing the choir depict birds pecking at grapes, while faces appear on the short sides. Biblical scenes are visible on the two western capitals. In one scene, Abraham raises a knife against his son Isaac, who lies on an altar before him; the hand of God intervenes to prevent the killing. A ram stands ready behind Abraham as a sacrificial animal. A Latin inscription is carved along the upper edge of the capital, translating to: "Where Abraham offered his son Isaac to the Lord as a sacrifice." Another scene depicts the prophet Daniel in the lions' den, with the inscription above: "Where he was sent into the lions' den." The apostles Peter, Paul, Thomas, and Philip are depicted on the sides of these two capitals.

The impost blocks of the crossing arches rest upon the capitals, projecting slightly outward. Their frieze extends around the piers, displaying vine tendrils that form circles framing birds, human heads, or grapes.

The relief decoration of the eastern section—comprising the apse, triumphal arch, presbytery, and transept—is attributed to a different stonemason or workshop of sculptors. These reliefs are less three-dimensional and feature a distinctly graphic style. The long sides of both capitals feature four blind arches representing the Heavenly Jerusalem. Above them, on the imposts, serpentine vines intertwine; from there, geometric motifs—such as squares, circles framed by cable moldings, vines, petals, and sun-wheel swastikas—extend across the apse walls (above the windows) and the presbytery as far as the crossing. The alfiz-style framing of the apse window echoes the blind arches—evoking the Jerusalem of Revelation—and is crowned by a fan-shaped rosette. The north and south windows are likewise adorned with an alfiz. A slightly narrower frieze also runs along the long sides of the presbytery at the level of the apse ceiling. Ornamentation also appears on the imposts of the transept portals, the imposts projecting from the reveals of the arches connecting the transepts and side aisles, and the capitals of the paired windows. Small fragments of the friezes have been reinstalled elsewhere. There is also a sun-dial inscribed on a stone in the interior wall of the church. The clock was never finished.^{Where?}

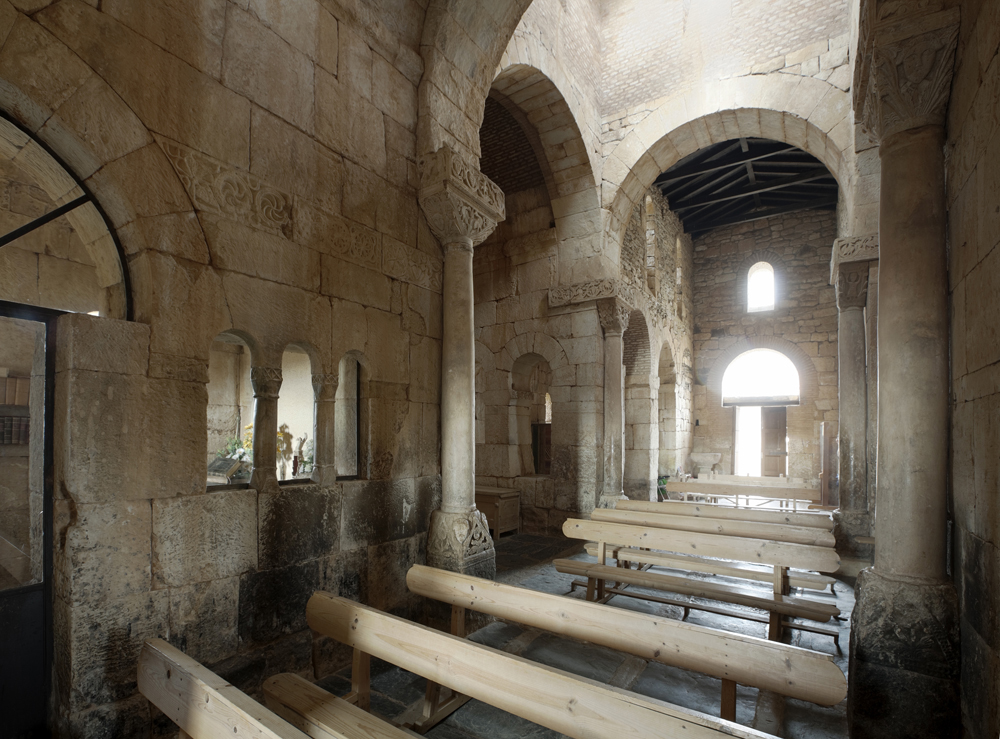
View across the nave from the presbytery to the west portal

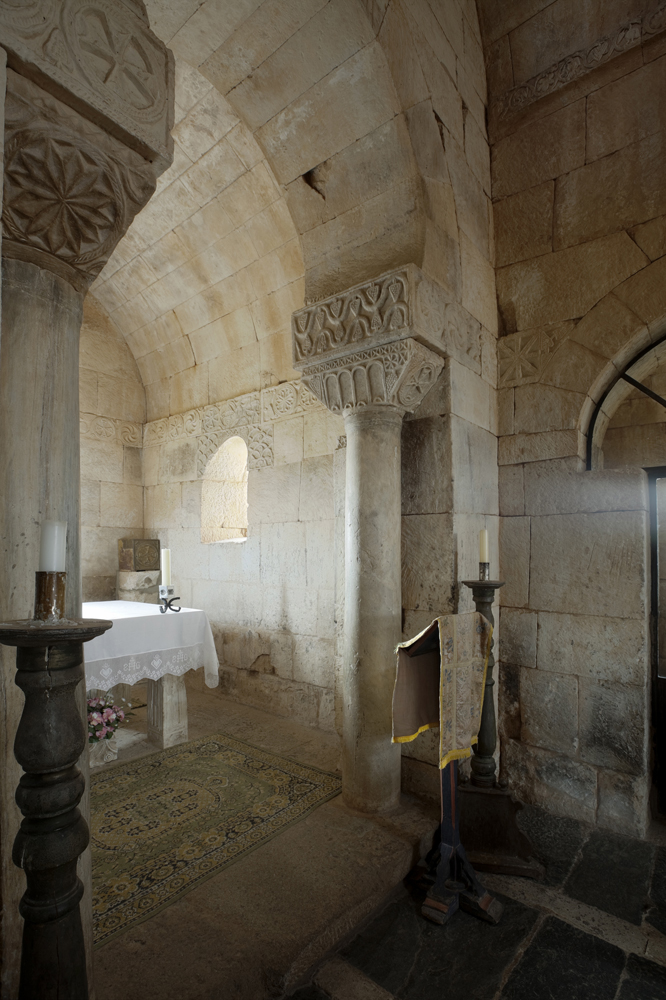
Triumphal arch and choir

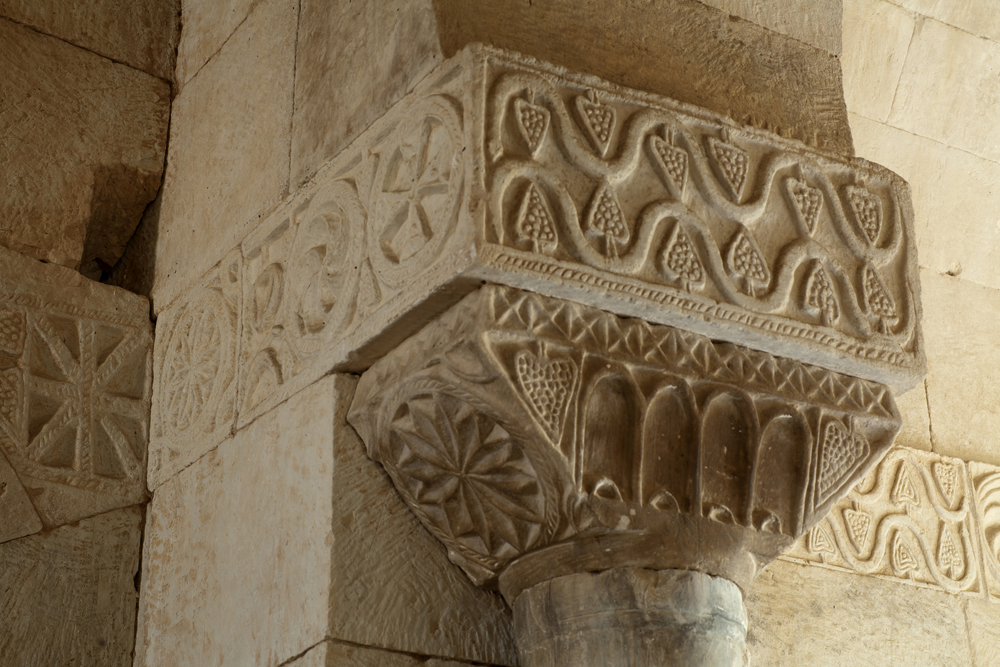
Northern capital of the triumphal arch

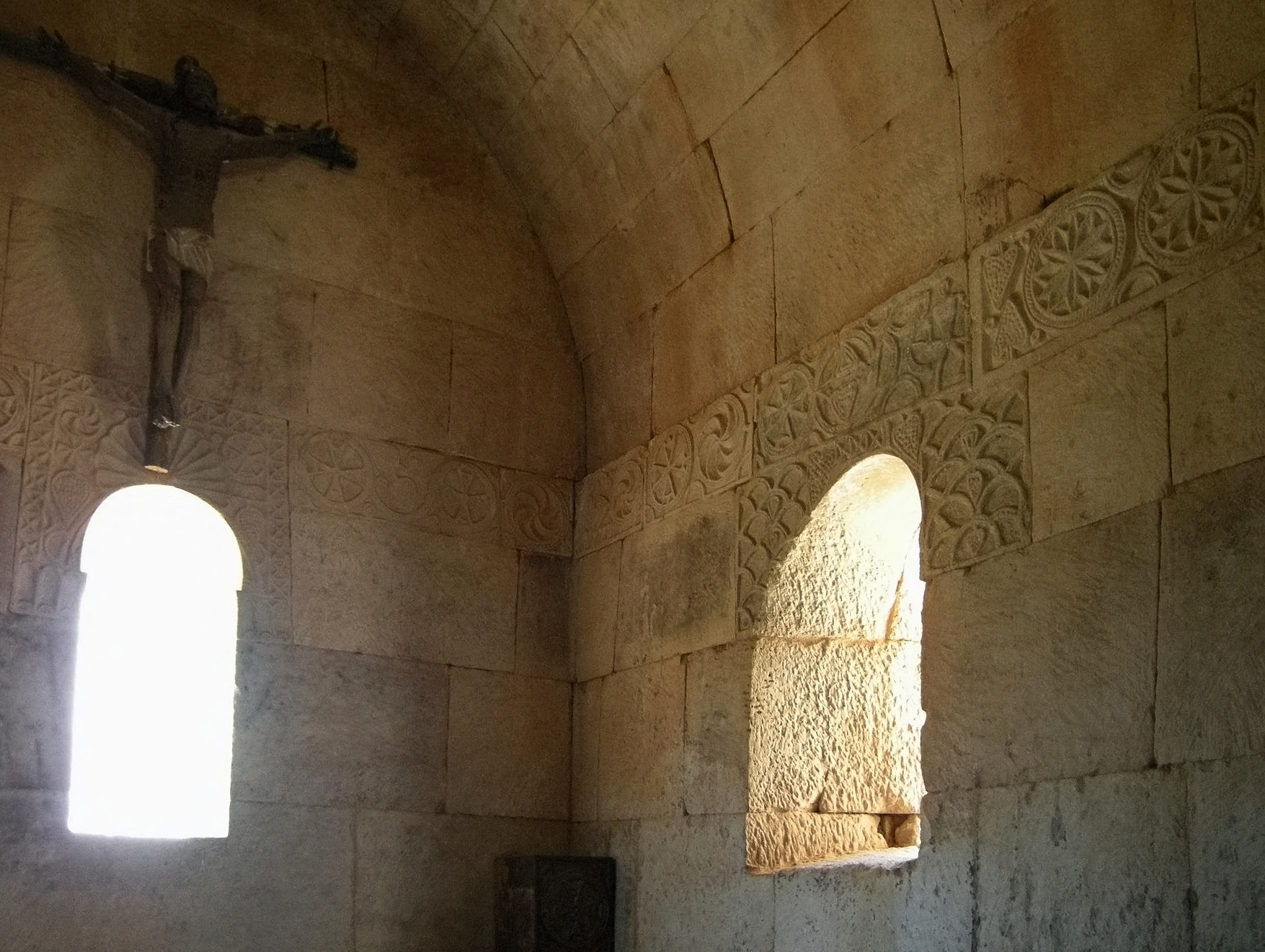
Choir apse with sculptoral frieze and half rosette in the alfiz

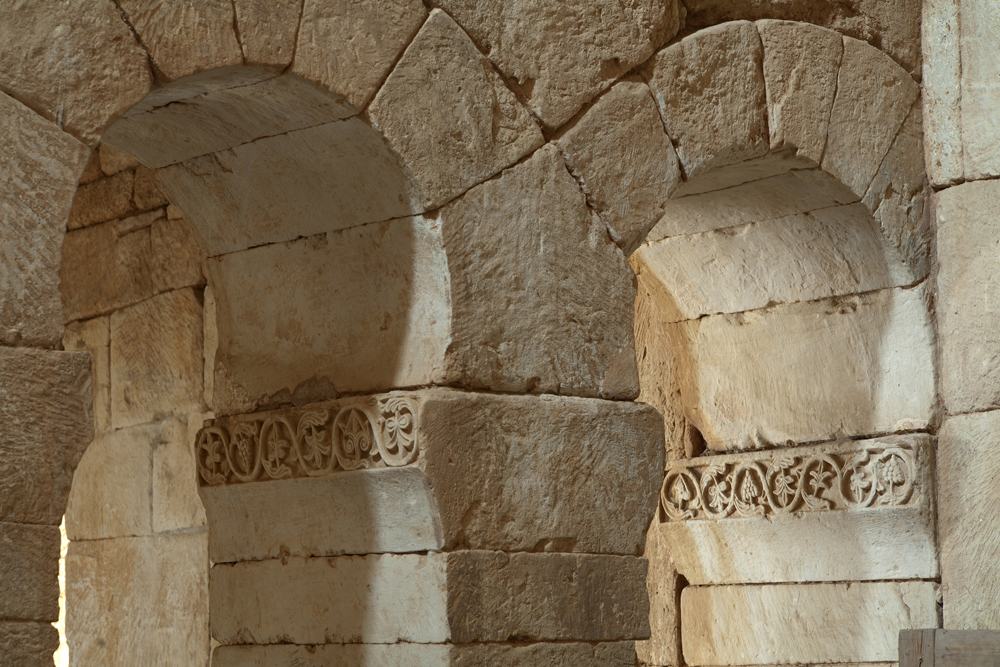
Horseshoe arches of the windows between the northern aisle and the transept

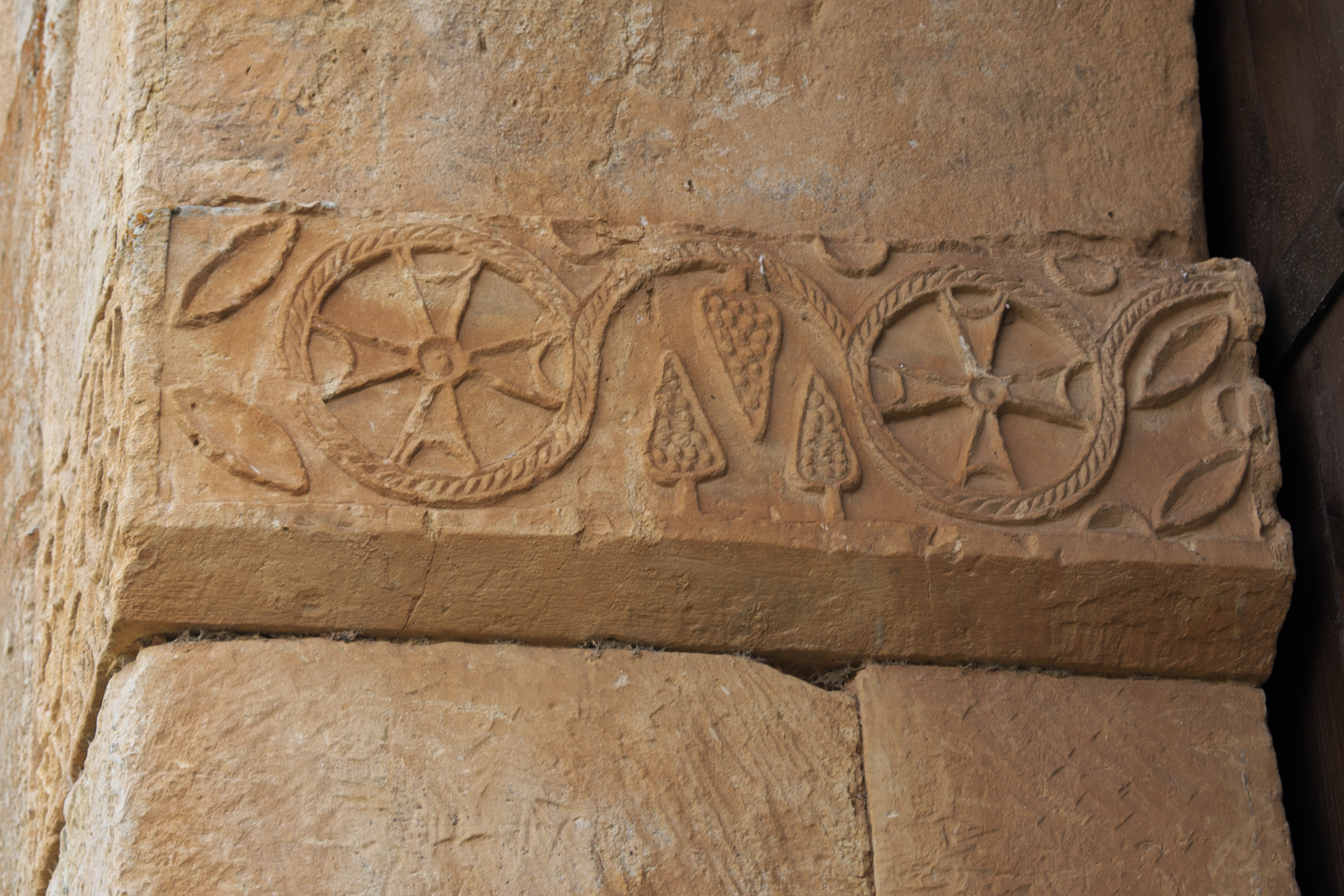
Impost of the west portal

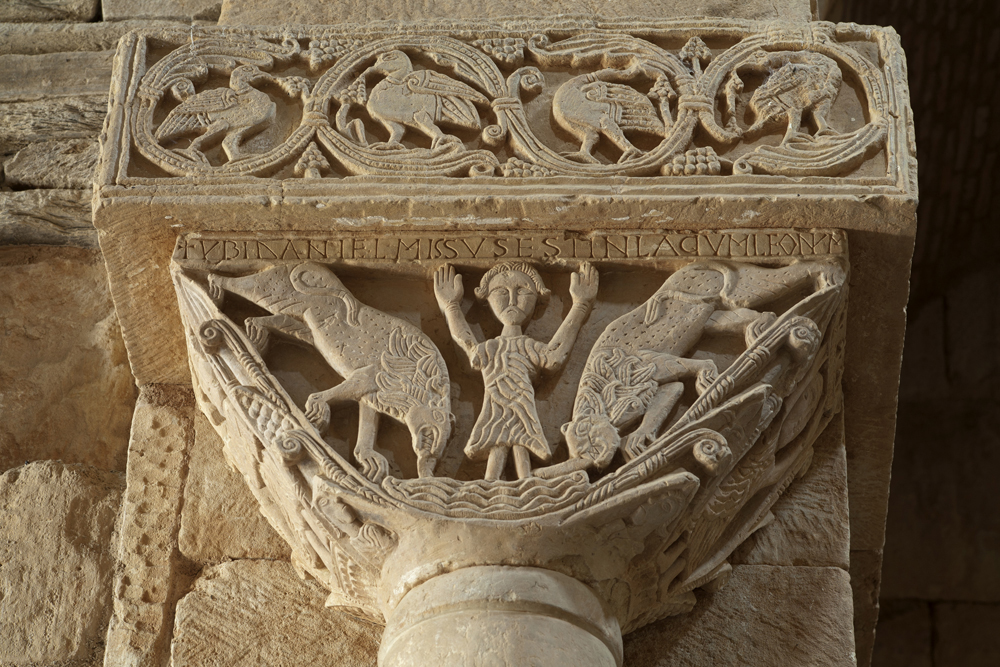
Daniel in the lion's den (northwest capital)

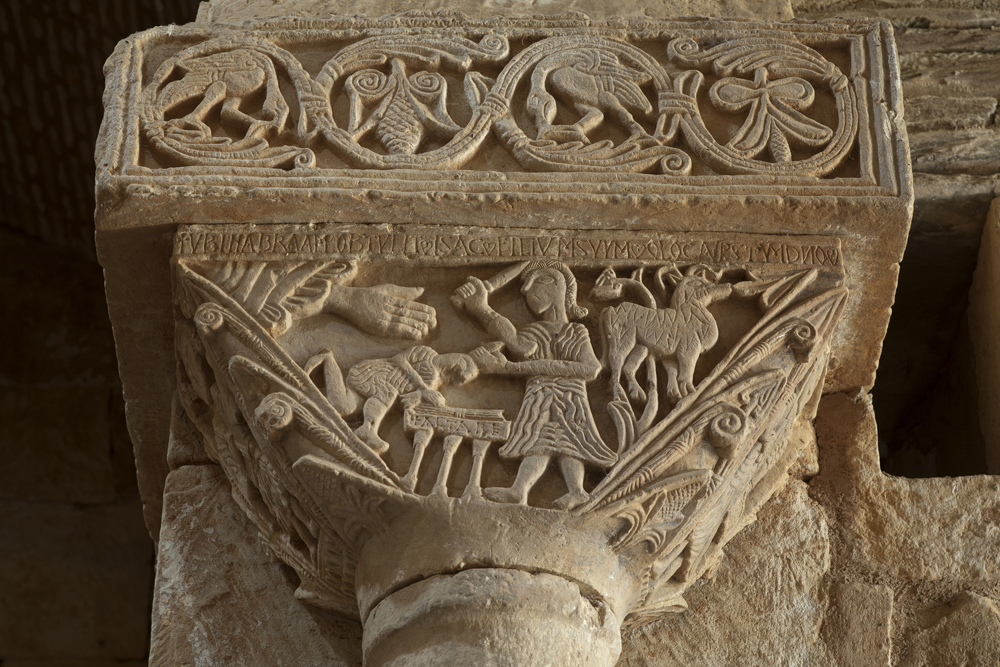
The Binding of Isaac (southwest capital)

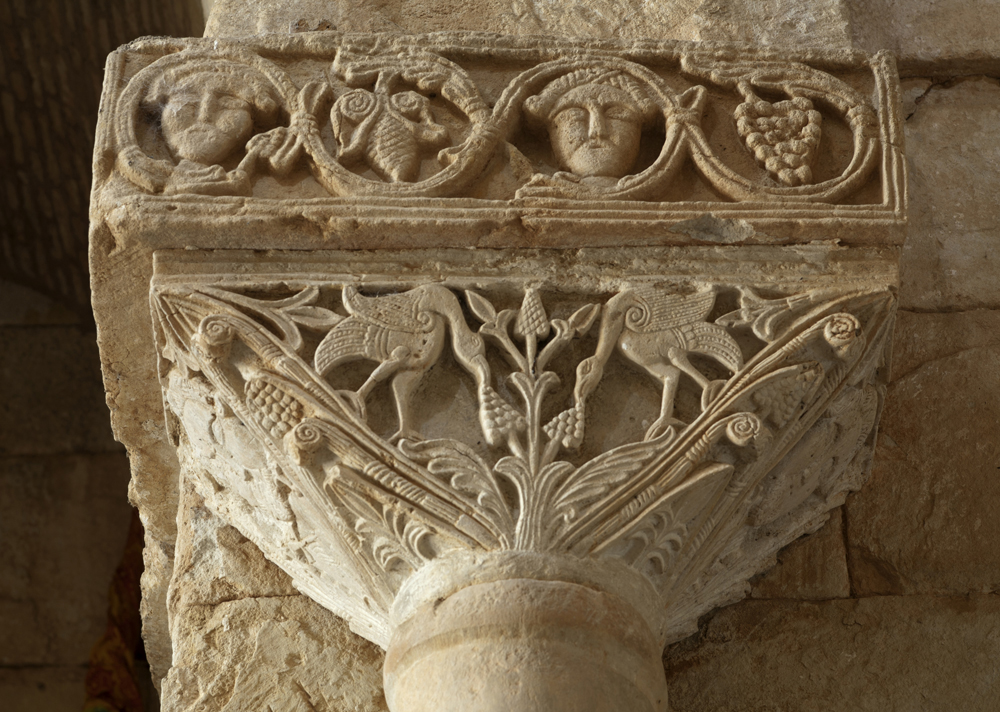
Birds picking grapes (northeast capital)

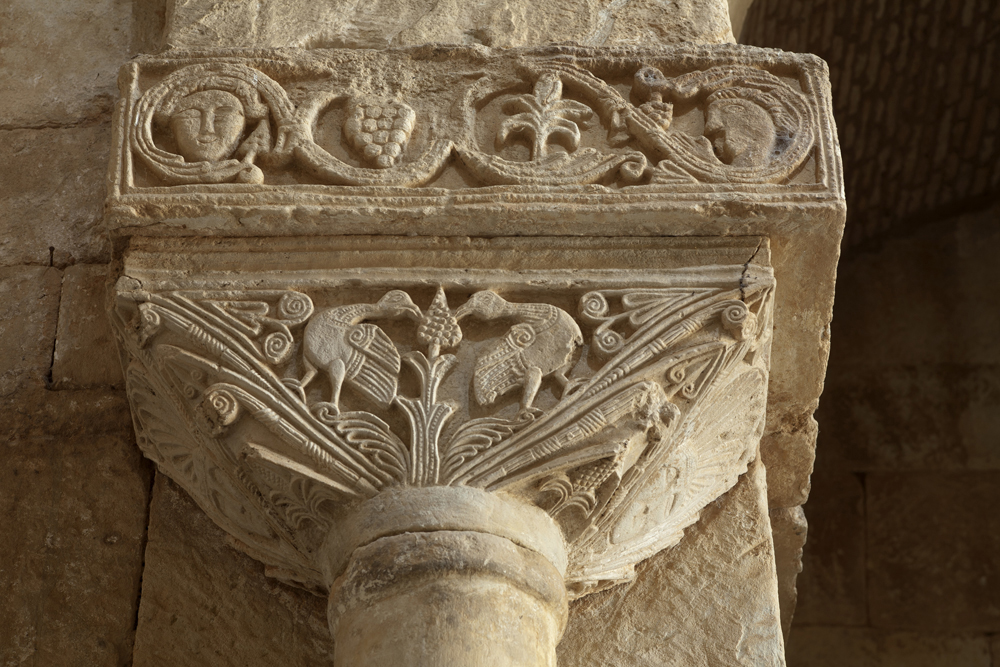
Birds picking grapes (southeast capital)

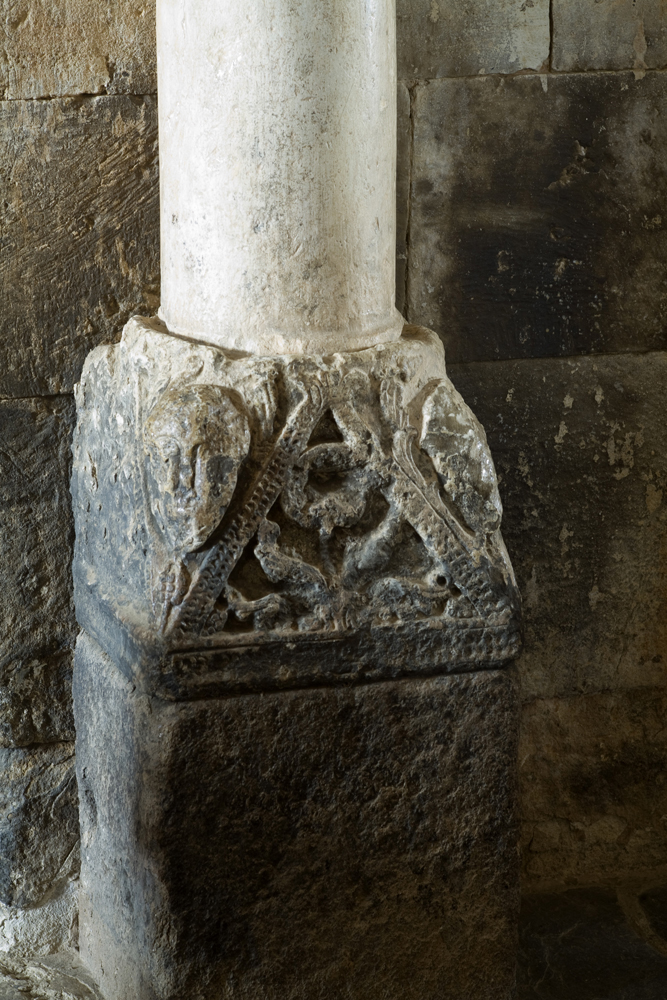
Base of southeast pier of the crossing with flowers and two heads

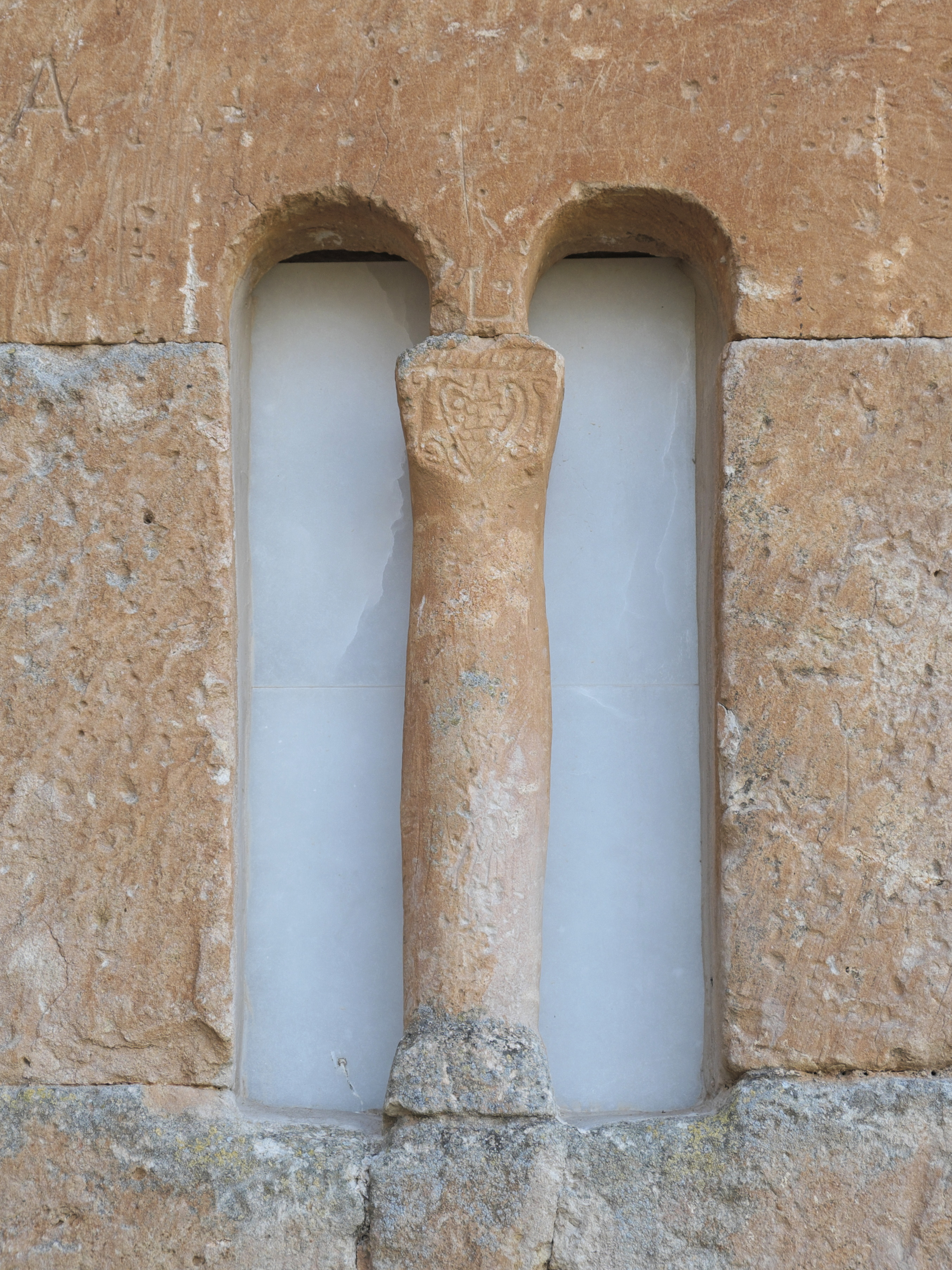
Bifora or ajimez

== See also ==
- List of oldest church buildings
- Visigothic art and architecture

== Literature ==
- Luis Caballero Zoreda und Fernando Arce. La Iglesia de San Pero de la Nave (Zamora). Arqueología y Architectura (PDF). AEspA 70, 1997, pp. 221–274 (in Spanish).
- Jaime Cobreros. Guía del Prerrománico en España. Madrid 2006, ISBN 84-9776-215-0, pp. 137–141 (in Spanish).
- André Corboz. Frühes Mittelalter (Henri Stierlin (ed.). Architektur der Welt, vol. 14), Office du Livre, Fribourg 1971, pp. 15 f., tables pp. 26–33 (in German).
- Jacques Fontaine. L'Art Préroman Hispanique. Vol. 1, 2nd ed., Éditions Zodiaque, Abbaye de la Pierre-Qui-Vire 1973, pp. 199–205 (in French).
