= Ioan Țepelea =

Ioan Țepelea (3 June 1949 – 26 March 2012) was the president of the international Academy of Sciences, Literature and Arts (ASLA), based in Oradea, Romania.

He was born on 3 June 1949, in the village of Beznea, near Bratca, Bihor County, Romania. He studied history and philosophy at Cluj-Napoca and has written many books about Romania and Europe in general at the time of World War I.

Țepelea died on 26 March 2012.
