= Almendra Dam =

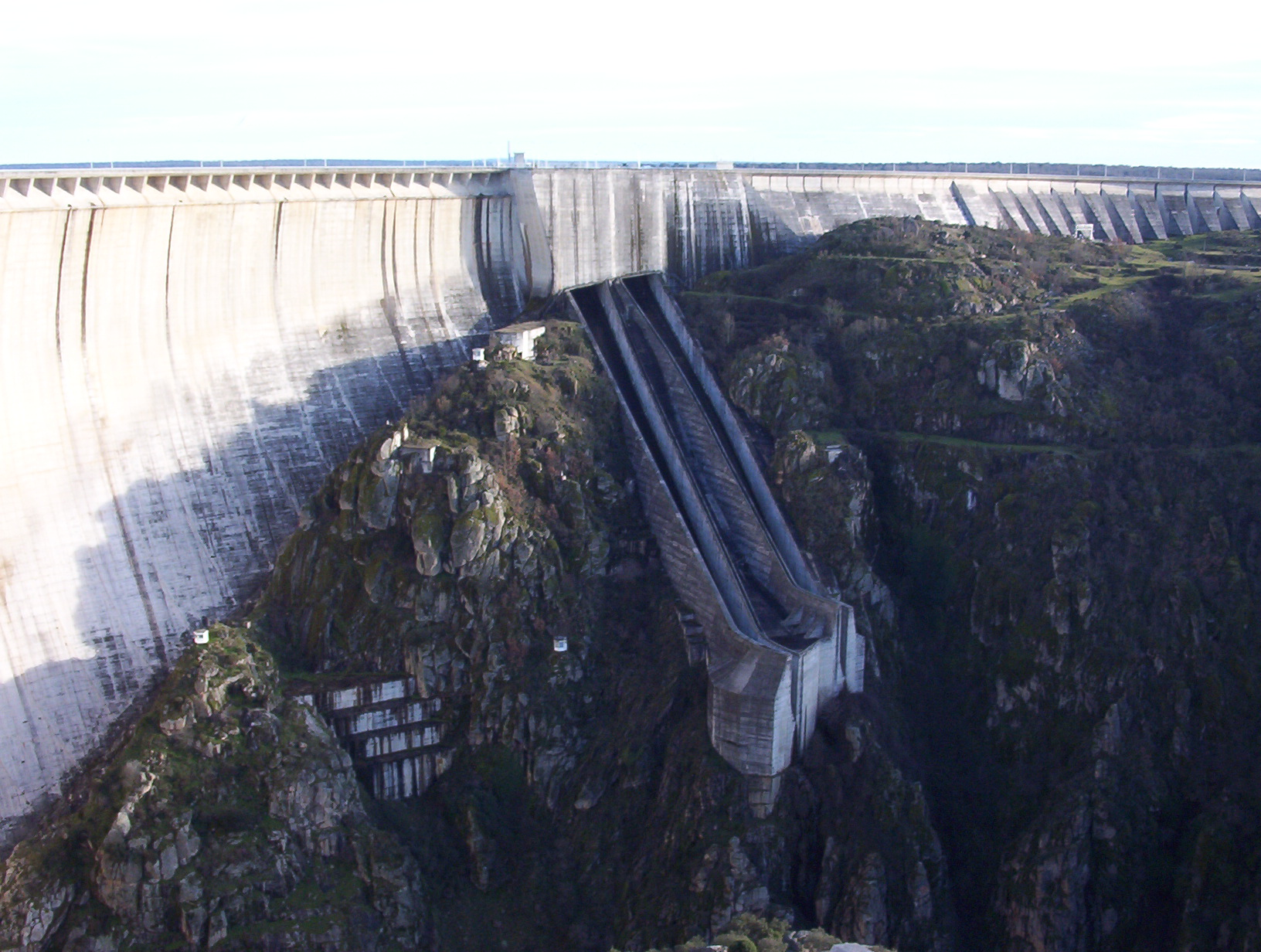
- Main arch section (left); Buttress section (right)

- Location within Spain
- Coordinates: 41°16′7.83″N 6°19′13.43″W
- Construction began: 1963
- Opening date: 1970

Dam and spillways
- Type of dam: Arch with buttress section
- Impounds: River Tormes
- Height: 202 m (663 ft)
- Length: 567 m (1,860 ft)
- Dam volume: 2,186,000 m^{3} (2,859,180 cu yd)
- Spillways: 2
- Spillway capacity: 3,039 m^{3}/s (107,321 cu ft/s)

Reservoir
- Total capacity: 2,500,000,000 m^{3} (2,026,783 acre⋅ft)
- Catchment area: 7,100 km^{2} (2,741 sq mi)
- Surface area: 86.5 km^{2} (33.4 sq mi)

Villarino Power Station
- Coordinates: 41°15′42.69″N 6°29′36.38″W
- Operator: Iberdrola
- Commission date: 1970-1977
- Type: Conventional, diversion
- Turbines: 6 x 135 MW Francis-type
- Installed capacity: 810 MW

The Almendra Dam, also known as Villarino Dam, in Salamanca, Spain, interrupts the course of the River Tormes five kilometres from the village from which it takes its name: Almendra (literally, almond). It was constructed between 1963 and 1970.

The arch dam forms part of the hydroelectric system known as the Saltos del Duero (in English "the Duero Drops"), along with the Castro, Ricobayo, Saucelle and Villalcampo dams of Spain, and the Bemposta, Miranda and Picote Dams of nearby Portugal.

The reservoir that backs up behind the dam covers 86.5 square kilometres and contains 2.5 billion cubic metres of water as well as several drowned villages, among them Argusinos. The dam is more than half a kilometre wide and, at a height of 202 metres, one of Spain's tallest structures.

The dam supplies the Villarino Power Station with water via a tunnel for hydroelectric power generation. It is located underground about 14 km (8.7 mi) west of the dam. Water discharged from the power station enters the Douro River. The power station has an installed capacity of 810 MW and was completed in 1977.

== Gallery ==
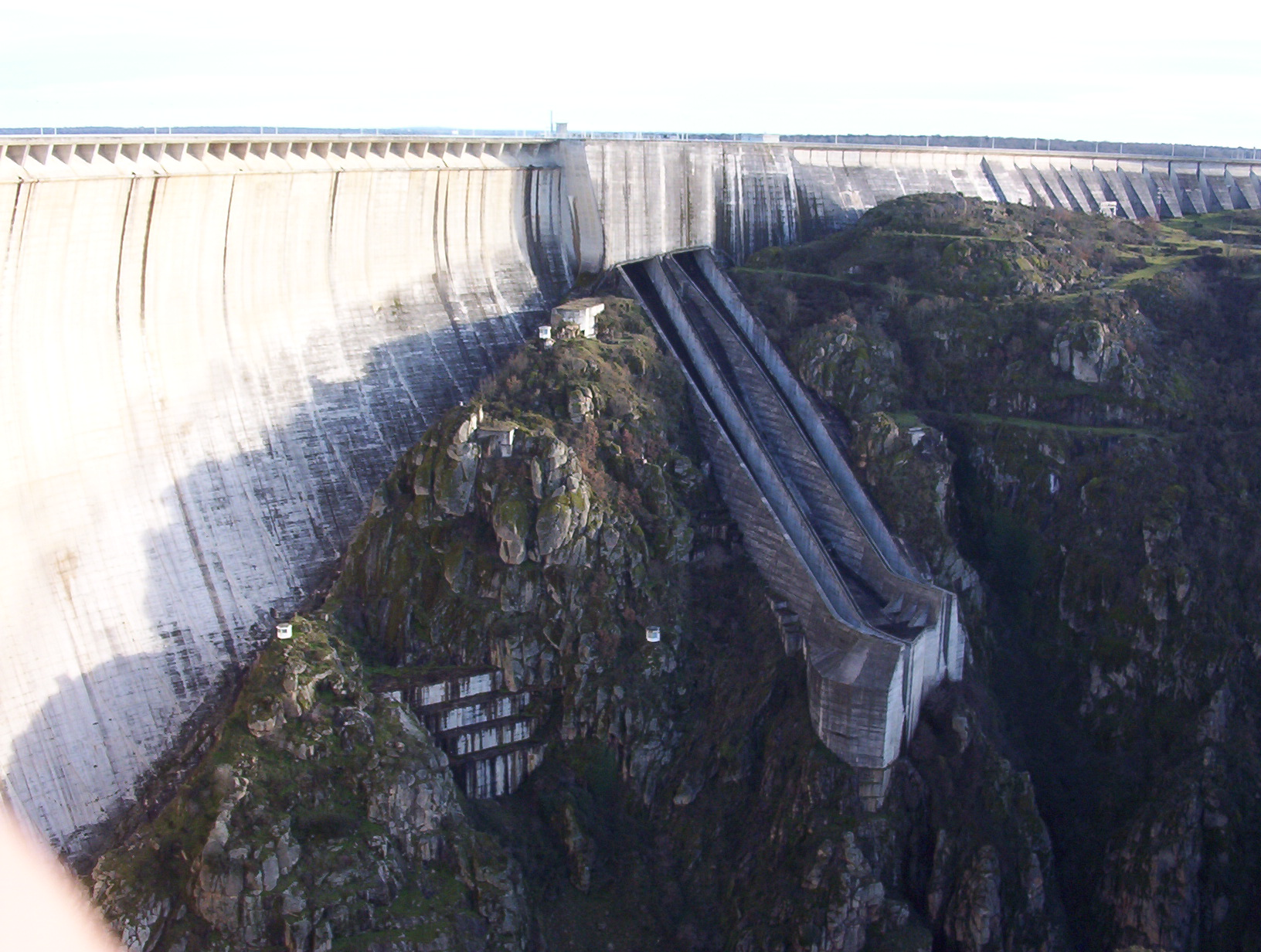

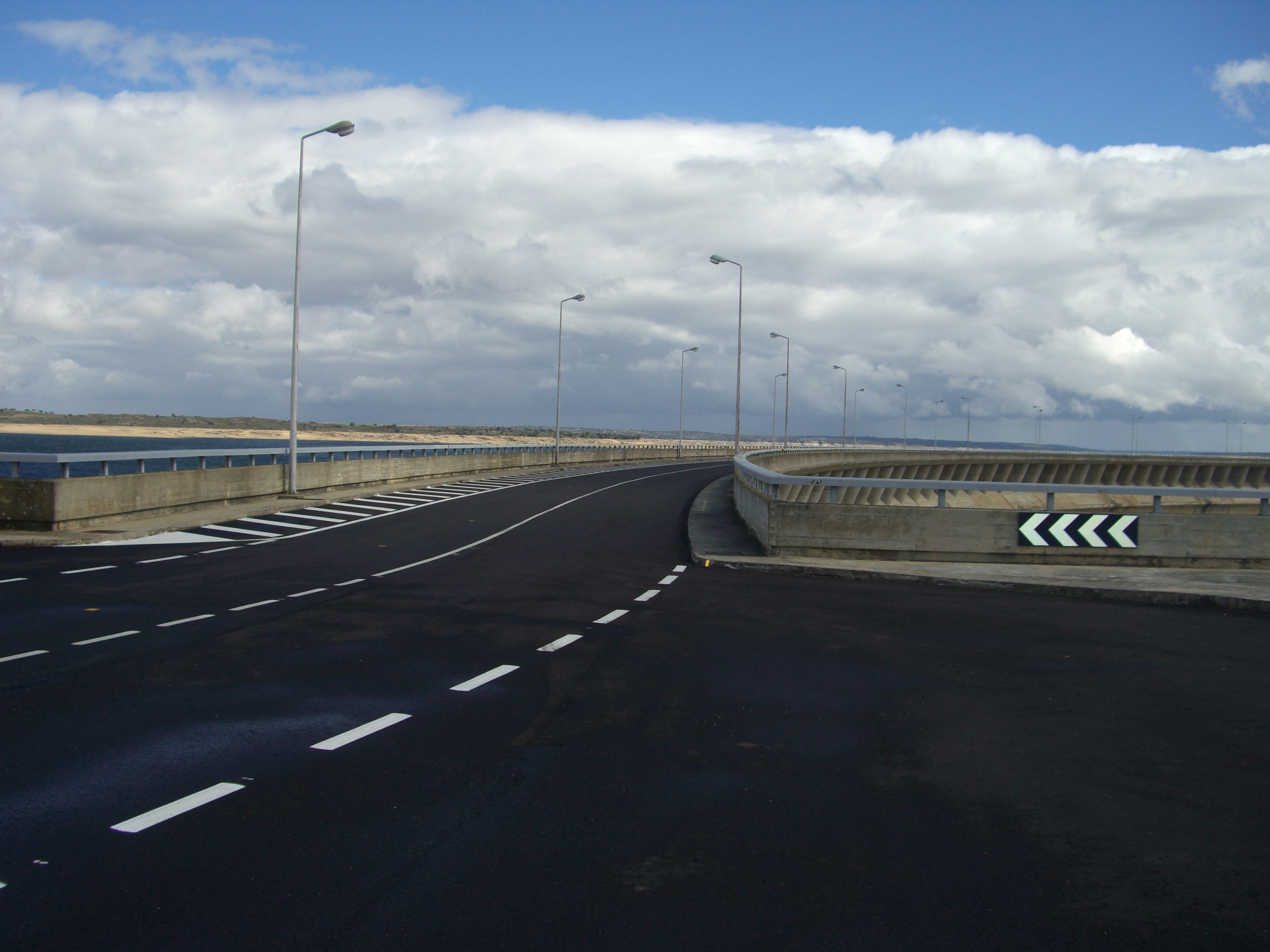

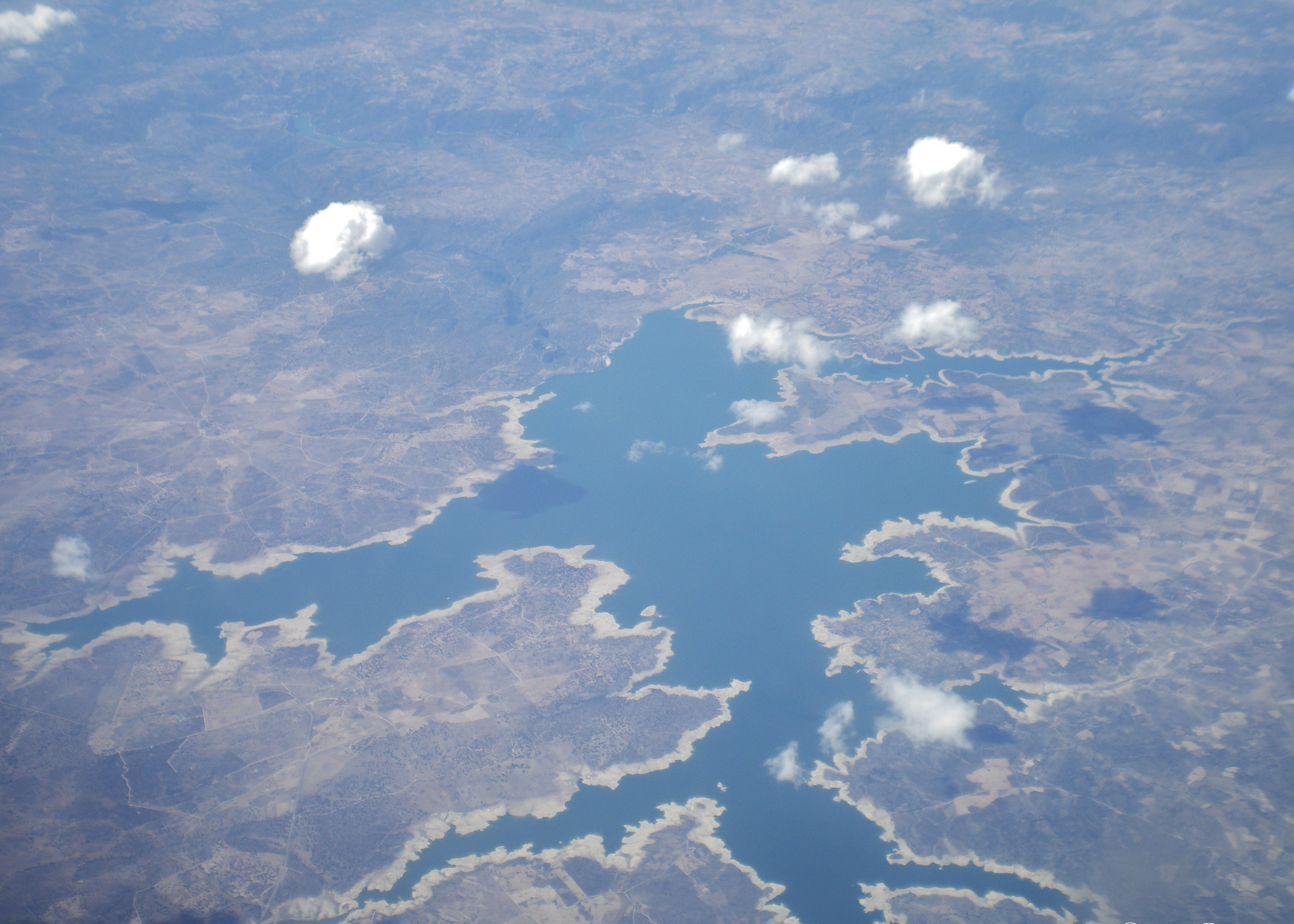

== See also ==
- Ricobayo Dam
