= Ricobayo Arch Bridge =

Supported deck arch bridge in Spain

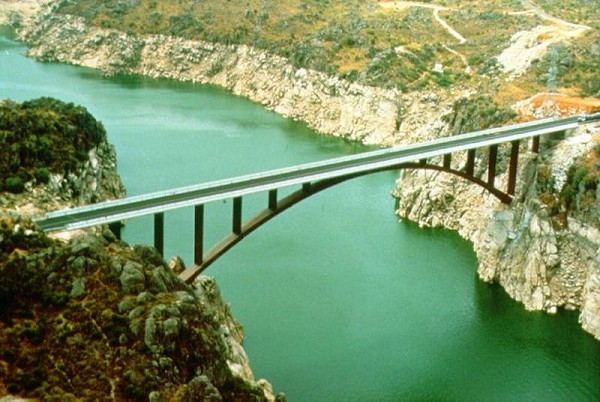
- Coordinates: 41.5354°N 5.9787°W
- Crosses: Esla River
- Locale: Ricobayo, Zamora

Characteristics
- Design: Arch
- Total length: 219m (718.5 ft)
- Width: 11 m (33ft), 2 lanes
- Longest span: 164m (540 ft).

History
- Opened: 1990s

The Ricobayo Arch Bridge (Spanish: Puente de San Esteban or Arco de Ricobayo) is a supported deck arch bridge that carries the National 122 Road over the Esla River at Ricobayo in the province of Zamora, Spain.

The original bridge at Ricobayo was drowned after the river was dammed impounding the Ricobayo reservoir. The arch bridge rises 23 m (75.5 ft) above the maximum water level of the reservoir. Its arch is a composite hollow box section of steel and concrete. The total length of the bridge is 219 m (718.5 ft) with an arch spanning 168 m (551 ft).

== Other bridges nearby ==
- Requejo viaduct has a steel arch stretching 120 m (394 ft) across the Duero River at Pino del Oro. It was designed by engineer Jose Eugenio Ribera
- Martin Gil Viaduct, measuring 192 m (630 ft), a world record in its day. The team included Eduardo Torroja. Construction of the Martín Gil Viaduct was disrupted by the Spanish Civil War, resulting in sources giving differing dates for completion:
  - Zamora 1942
  - 1936 Rio Esla-Brücke Zamora, 192 m.

== See also ==
- Ricobayo Dam
