= Academia de Științe, Literatură și Arte =

Academic society based in Oradea, Romania

Academia de Ştiinţe, Literatură şi Arte (ASLA) is an academic society based in Oradea, Romania. Through the actions of ASLA, Oradea is now known as a major Romanian cultural and academic centre.

ASLA was founded in 1993. It is associated with the American-Romanian Academy, and in 2002 held a joint conference. ASLA seeks to promote the arts, literature and sciences. Its current president is Ioan Ţepelea. In addition to Romania, the academy has over 300 members in around 15 countries, including such places as Haiti and Australia.
