= Muelas del Pan =

Place in Castile and León, Spain

Coordinates: 41°31′N 5°58′W

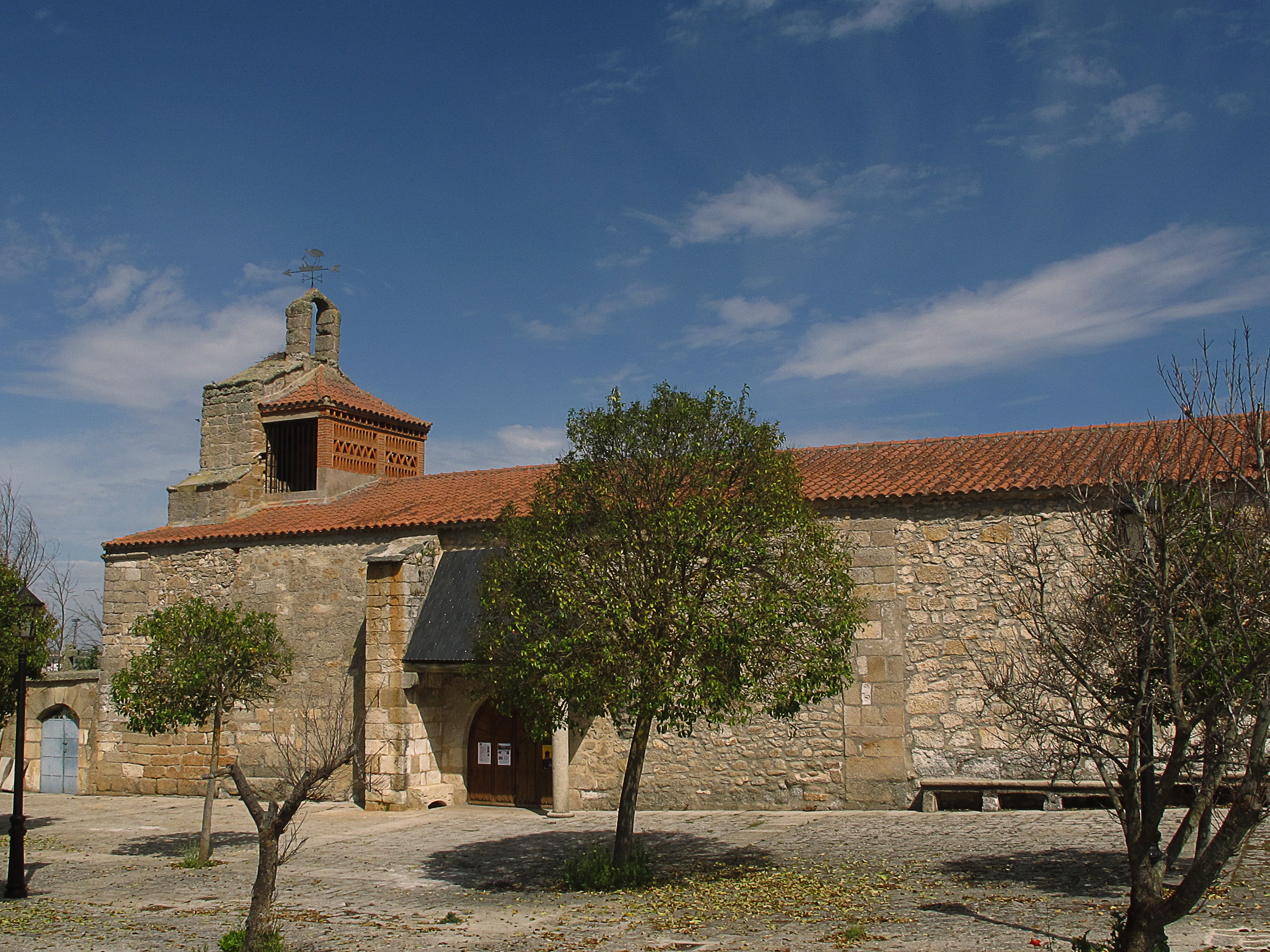

- Flag Coat of arms
- Interactive map of Muelas del Pan
- Country: Spain
- Autonomous community: Castile and León
- Province: Zamora
- Municipality: Muelas del Pan

Area
  - Total: 72.61 km^{2} (28.03 sq mi)
- Elevation: 772 m (2,533 ft)

Population (2025-01-01)
  - Total: 592
  - Density: 8.15/km^{2} (21.1/sq mi)
- Time zone: UTC+1 (CET)
  - Summer (DST): UTC+2 (CEST)
- Climate: Csb

Muelas del Pan is a municipality located in the province of Zamora, Castile and León, Spain.

According to the 2004 census (INE), the municipality had a population of 844 inhabitants.

== See also ==
- Tierra del Pan
