= Saucelle Dam =

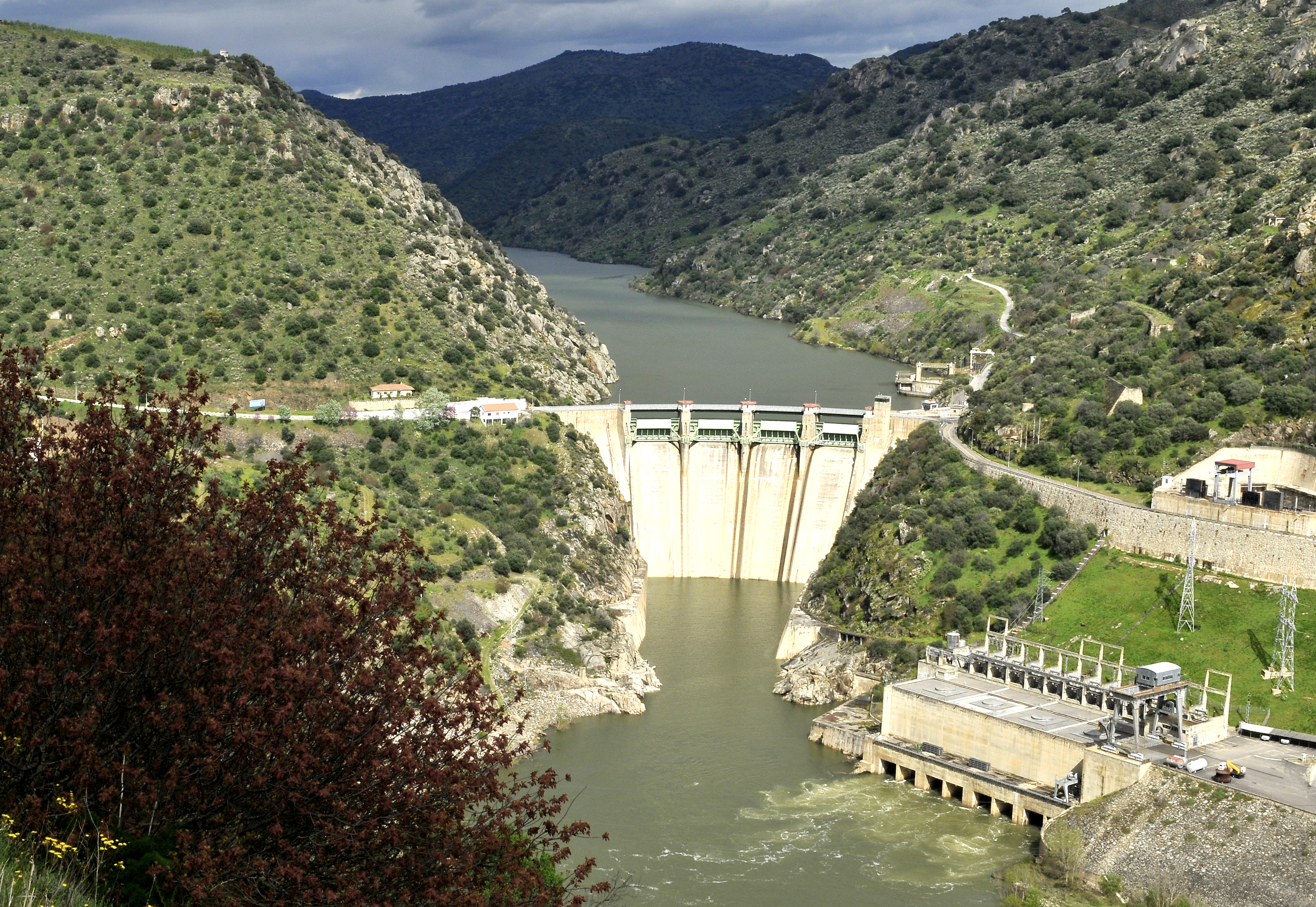
- Downstream face of the dam

- Location within Spain
- Country: Spain
- Location: Saucelle, Salamanca, Castile and León
- Coordinates: 41°2′50.05″N 6°48′14.69″W
- Purpose: Power
- Status: Operational
- Construction began: 1950
- Opening date: 1956; 70 years ago

Dam and spillways
- Type of dam: Gravity
- Impounds: Douro River
- Height: 83 m (272 ft)
- Length: 189 m (620 ft)
- Dam volume: 233,560 m^{3} (305,480 cu yd)
- Spillway capacity: 12,940 m^{3}/s (457,000 cu ft/s)

Reservoir
- Total capacity: 181,500,000 m^{3} (147,100 acre⋅ft)
- Catchment area: 73,715 km^{2} (28,462 mi^{2})

Power Station
- Operator: Iberdrola
- Commission date: Saucelle I: 1956; Saucelle II: 1985
- Turbines: Saucelle I: 4 x 62.5 MW; Saucelle II: 2 x 134.5 MW Francis-type
- Installed capacity: Saucelle I: 251 MW; Saucelle II: 269 MW; Total: 520 MW

The Saucelle Dam is a gravity dam on the Douro River. It is located about 4 km (2.5 mi) west of Saucelle in the province of Salamanca, Castile and León, Spain. The dam straddles the border of Spain and Portugal but is owned and operated by Spain's Iberdrola. Construction on the dam began in 1950 and was completed in 1956. The primary purpose of the dam is hydroelectric power production and it has an installed capacity of 520 MW. The power is produced by two power stations, both located just downstream. Saucelle I was commissioned in 1956 and contains four 62.5 MW Francis turbine-generators for an installed capacity of 251 MW. Saucelle II is located underground and was commissioned in 1985. It contains two 134.5 MW Francis turbine-generators for an installed capacity of 269 MW.

== See also ==
- Aldeadávila Dam – upstream
