= Əşlə =

- Municipality
- Location within Azerbaijan
- Coordinates: 38°42′36″N 48°44′02″E
- Country: Azerbaijan
- Rayon: Lankaran

Population
  - Total: 317
- Time zone: UTC+4 (AZT)
  - Summer (DST): UTC+5 (AZT)

Əşlə (also, Əshlə, Eshlya, and Eşlə) is a village and municipality in the Lankaran Rayon of Azerbaijan. It has a population of 317.
