= Esla (river) =

River in Spain

Coordinates: 41°35′29.33″N 5°58′46.12″W

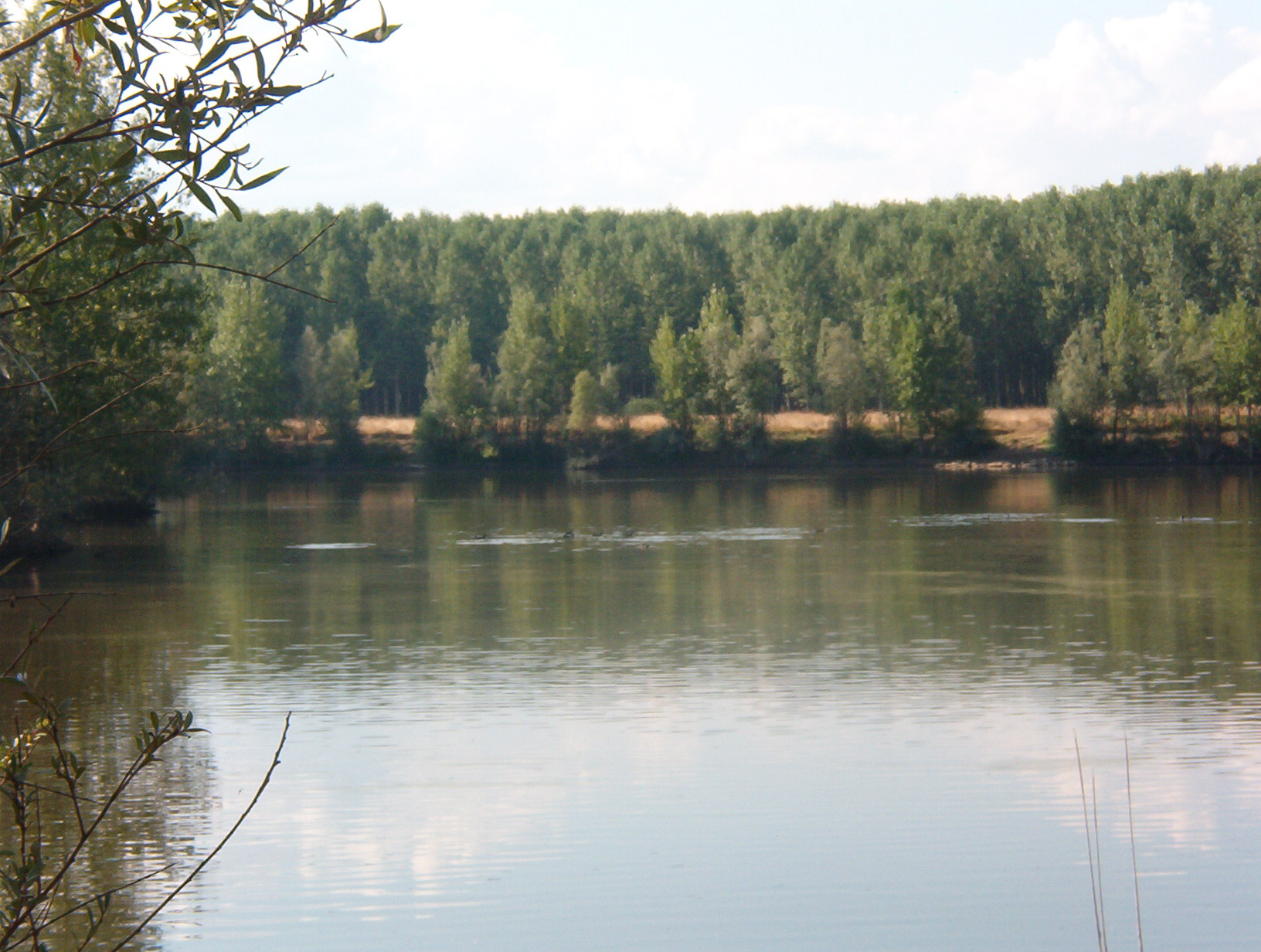
- View of the Esla River

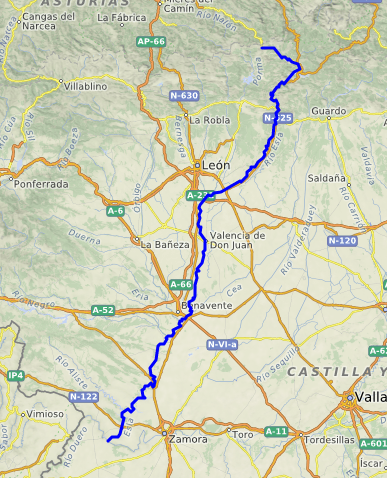

Location
- Country: Spain

Physical characteristics
- Source
  - elevation: 1,500 metres (4,900 ft)
- Mouth
  - location: Duero River
- Length: 275 kilometres (171 mi)
- Basin size: 16,081 square kilometres (6,209 mi^{2})
- Discharge
  - average: 135 cubic metres per second (4,800 cu ft/s)

Basin features
- Progression: Douro→ Atlantic Ocean

The Esla is a river in the provinces of León and Zamora in the northwest of Spain. It is a tributary of the Duero River that starts in the Cantabrian Mountains and is 275 kilometres (171 mi) long. Its direction of flow is from north to south. It is the largest tributary of the Duero in terms of discharge; in fact, at its mouth at the confluence with the Duero, it has a greater discharge than the volume in the main river.

The most official source of the river is the “Fuente del Naranco” in Valdosín (near La Uña in León province).

This river was known as the Astura to the ancient Romans, from which the Asturian people took their name. They were ancestors of the modern inhabitants of Asturias and León, living on both sides of the Cantabrian Mountains. Many of the toponyms in the area owe their name to the river; for example, Villafalé (Villa Fértil a orillas del Río Astura), Vega del Esla, Mansilla del Esla, etc.

In the 19th century, the Canal del Esla was built to irrigate the Vega de Toral. In the 1980s, a dam and reservoir project to generate hydroelectric power required the submersion of seven villages along the Esla in León, including Riaño. New villages were built along the reservoir to replace these historic towns.

The principal tributaries of the Esla are:

- Bernesga
- Cea
- Órbigo
- Porma River
- Tera River
- Aliste River

== See also ==
- List of rivers of Spain
- Ricobayo Arch Bridge
- Ricobayo Dam
