= N-122 road (Spain) =

Highway in Spain

National road N-122
- Carretera nacional N-122

Route information
- Length: 115 km (71 mi)

Major junctions
- From: Soria
- To: San Martín del Pedroso

Location
- Country: Spain

Highway system
- Highways in Spain; Autopistas and autovías; National Roads

The N-122 is a highway in Spain. It connects Valladolid and Zaragoza to the Portugal–Spain border, where it connects to the A4 motorway (Portugal), this section was formerly the IP-4 and is now part of the European route E82 to Matosinhos. The border is formed by the Rio Macãs it heads east crossing the Esla river to Zamora and the Duero river valley. The N-630 crosses to the north and south.

After Zamora the N-122 follows the river passing Toro. Most traffic now takes the Autovía A-11. At Tordesillas there are junctions with the Autovía A-62 and Autovía A-6 The road becomes the A-62 to Valladolid where it meets the N-601. The road heads east as the A-11 and then after 14 km the N-122 again. The road crosses to the south bank of the Rio Duero to the town and castle of Peñafiel. It continues to Aranda de Duero and the Autovía A-1. After 52 km the road meets the N-110 and heads north out of the Duero Valley past El Burgo de Osma onto Soria. Here the road meets the N-111 and N-234.

To the northeast the road crosses Sierra del Morto by the Puerto del Madro and then heads through the Sierra del Moncayo. The Parque natural de la Dehesa del Moncayo lies to the east. The N-113 passes to the north. The road heads into the Ebro valley passing the Monasterio de Veruela, overlooked by the Balcón de El Buste and the Santuario de Nuestra Sra. de la Misericordia. The road ends at Junction 19 of the Autopista AP-68 and N-232 43 km north west of Zaragoza.

== History ==
In January 2024, the Spanish Army was required to rescue 600 motorists stuck in snow on the N-122 road between Soria and Agreda.

== Settlements en route ==
- Magallón
- Borja
- Maleján
- Bulbuente
- Tarazona
- Torrellas
- Ágreda
- Matalebreras
- Villar del Campo
- Aldealpozo
- Fuensaúco
- Soria
- Golmayo
- Carbonera de Frentes
- Villaciervos
- Valdealvillo
- Torralba del Burgo
- El Burgo de Osma
- San Esteban de Gormaz
- Velilla de San Esteban
- Langa de Duero
- Fresnillo de las Dueñas
- Aranda de Duero
- Castrillo de la Vega
- Fuentecén
- Nava de Roa
- Peñafiel
- Padilla de Duero
- Quintanilla de Arriba
- Quintanilla de Onésimo
- Sardón de Duero
- Tudela de Duero
- La Cistérniga
- Valladolid
- Tordesillas
- Villaester de Arriba
- Villaester de Abajo
- Morales de Toro
- Toro
- Monte la Reina
- Fresno de la Ribera
- Zamora
- Muelas del Pan
- Ricobayo
- Fonfría
- Fornillos de Aliste
- Alcañices
- Sejas de Aliste
- Trabazos
- San Martín del Pedroso
