= Torremocha =

Torremocha can refer to:

The name of several places in Spain:

- Torremocha, Cáceres
- Torremocha de Ayllón, a village in Soria, part of the municipality of San Esteban de Gormaz
- Torremocha del Campo, a town in the province of Guadalajara, Castile-La Mancha
- Torremocha de Jadraque, a town in the province of Guadalajara, Castile-La Mancha
- Torremocha de Jarama, a town in the province of Madrid
- Torremocha de Jiloca, a town in the province of Teruel, Aragon
- Torremocha del Pinar, a town in the province of Guadalajara, Castile-La Mancha
