= E82 =

E82 may refer to:

- European route E82, an international road
- A model of the BMW 1 Series car
- King's Indian Defence, Sämisch Variation, Encyclopaedia of Chess Openings code
- Chiba-Tōgane Road, route E82 in Japan
