= Frutos María Martínez =

Spanish sculptor and painter

- Born: 21 January 1959; Hontoria de Valdearados, Burgos, Spain
- Occupation: Artist
- Years active: 1974 - present
- Known for: Recycled art
- Notable work: Eclosion of the Form, JANO
- Spouse: Ana Perosanz
- Children: Miguel María Perosanz, Paula María Perosanz and Julián María Perosanz
- Parents: Julián María (father); Aurelia Martínez (mother)

Frutos María Martínez (born 21 January 1959) is a Spanish sculptor and painter. He lives and works in Alicante, Spain.

== Biography ==
Frutos María Martínez was born in Hontoria de Valdearados, in the province of Burgos, Spain. He began sculpting and painting from an early age, building his own toys and gimmicks, thus showcasing an artisting inclination and interest in manual tasks.

At the age of 10, he began selling his creations and decorative objects in his immediate circle. Later, at the age of 15 he became a student at the "La Sindical", a trade school in Aranda de Duero where he specializes in "Industrial Mastery" with emphasis on metallurgy.

In 1986, at the age of 27, Frutos moved with his family to Alicante, Valencia, where he met Juan Guardiola Gaya, an architect and plastic artist who became his mentor. Guardiola Gaya introduced Frutos to the circle of artists, galleries and exhibitions of Alicante.

== Work ==
The artistic style and trajectory of Frutos María Martínez is marked by an environmental concern with a focus on the pollution and damage caused by discarded garbage in the ecosystems of the seas and oceans

"Many things are thrown into the sea that should not end up there, and we have to be aware that it is bad for wildlife, as well as humans. I make works of art out of rusty metal sheets and tarpaulins, for example."

This concern drives Frutos to collect materials such as wood, iron, stone, lead, cork, resins, sand and natural pigments from the coast of the Mediterranean Sea, which he uses to create his works. He made his first collective exhibition in 2008, and since then he has carried out numerous collective and individual exhibitions, working with both sculpture and painting.

On 1 June 2024, Frutos María donated a sculpture for auction during the first Benin-Africa Solidarity Gala. The event took place in Benidorm for Mensajeros de la Paz del Padre Ángel and the piece was purchased for 7,000 euros.

== Awards ==
Frutos María is the author of the award handed to the winners of the "Importantes" Prize. It is a piece called "Armonía Vertical", or "Vertical Harmony" made of solid forged iron with a welded base, oxidation and patina finish. The piece was exhibited during the 2024 "IMPORTANTES" gala by INFORMACIÓN, held at the Alicante Provincial Government Auditorium (ADDA).

During this 39th edition, the 18 awardees were presented with a Frutos María statuette, a prized artwork that was exhibited in New York City last year. As for the 40th edition of this outstanding gala, the winners will also receive a statuette of the famous sculptor.

== Exhibits ==
=== Solo exhibitions ===
Year	Title	Place	Location
2011	“Hatching of form”	INFORMACIÓN Club	Alicante
2013	“Hatching of form II”	Former Chapell of the Franciscan Venerable Third Order	Elche (Alicante)
2013	“Hatching of form III”	Cultura Frax Foundation	Albir (Alicante)
2014	“Hatching of form IV”	Cultural Centre Jaume i Fluixà	Calpe (Alicante)
2015	“Hatching of form V”	Cultural Centre of San Juan	San Juan (Alicante)
2015	“Hatching of form VI”	D. Pedro la Barbera Salon	Villajoyosa (Alicante)
2015	“Shapes and strength”	Arena Gymnasium	Alicante
2016	"Painted Architecture"	Museum of Mar y Castillo Fortaleza	Santa Pola (Alicante)
2016	“Part of my life"	Provincial Council of Alicante	Alicante
2016	"Renewal of nature"	Foundation Caja Mediterráneo	Orihuela (Alicante)
2017	"New life"	Santa Pola Cape	Alicante
2018	“JANO”	Esplanade of the Alicante Museum	Alicante
2019	“Migrations”	San Lorenzo del Escorial	Madrid
2019	“Sea of wood”	Santa Bárbara Castle	Alicante
2020	“Steel and sea wrecks”	Museum of the University of Alicante	Alicante
2021	"Motivation"	«Eduardo Chicharro» Showroom	Madrid
2021	"Sobre mi manto"	Diario Información Club	Alicante
2022	"Creatividad natural"	Mediterráneo Foundation	Alicante
2023	"Contemporary Art Exhibition"	La Nacional - Spanish Benevolent Society	New York
2023	"Construcción de la Mirada"	Exhibition Hall "Pablo Serrano"	Madrid
2023	"Arte Infinito"	Eduardo Chicharro Exhibition Hall	Madrid
Permanent Display	"Nature hatching"	FUNDESEM Business School	Alicante

=== Collective exhibitions ===
Year	Title	Place	Location
2008	“A tres”	Culture Centre of Busot	Busot (Alicante)
2010	“Exhibition of the work of Ko Kwinkelenberg and Frutos María”	-	Las huertas cape (Alicante)
2015	“The form for the form”	Cultura Frax Foundation	Albir (Alicante)
2019	“Open Geometries”	Official College of Surveyors and Technical Architects of Madrid	Madrid
2019	"Galaxy Space"	Fernández de los Ríos 93	Madrid
2021	"More life, more road (COVID-19)" - Salvador Dalí Exhibit	Santana Art Gallery	Madrid
2021	"Festiarte" - III International Art Fair	Costa del Sol	Avenida del Mar, Marbella
2021	Collective Exhibition	Espacio Cultural Abierto	Madrid
2022	"ART FAIM" - 18th Edition of Independent Art Madrid	Fundación Pons Gallery	Madrid
2023	"Primavera en Madrid"	Espacio Cultural Abierto	Madrid

== Personal life ==
Frutos currently resides in Alicante with his wife of more than 35 years Ana, and their three children, Miguel, Paula and Julián.
