= Peter de Regalado =

Spanish Friar Minor and saint (1390–1456)

Saint Peter Regalado O.F.M.
- Priest and Religious
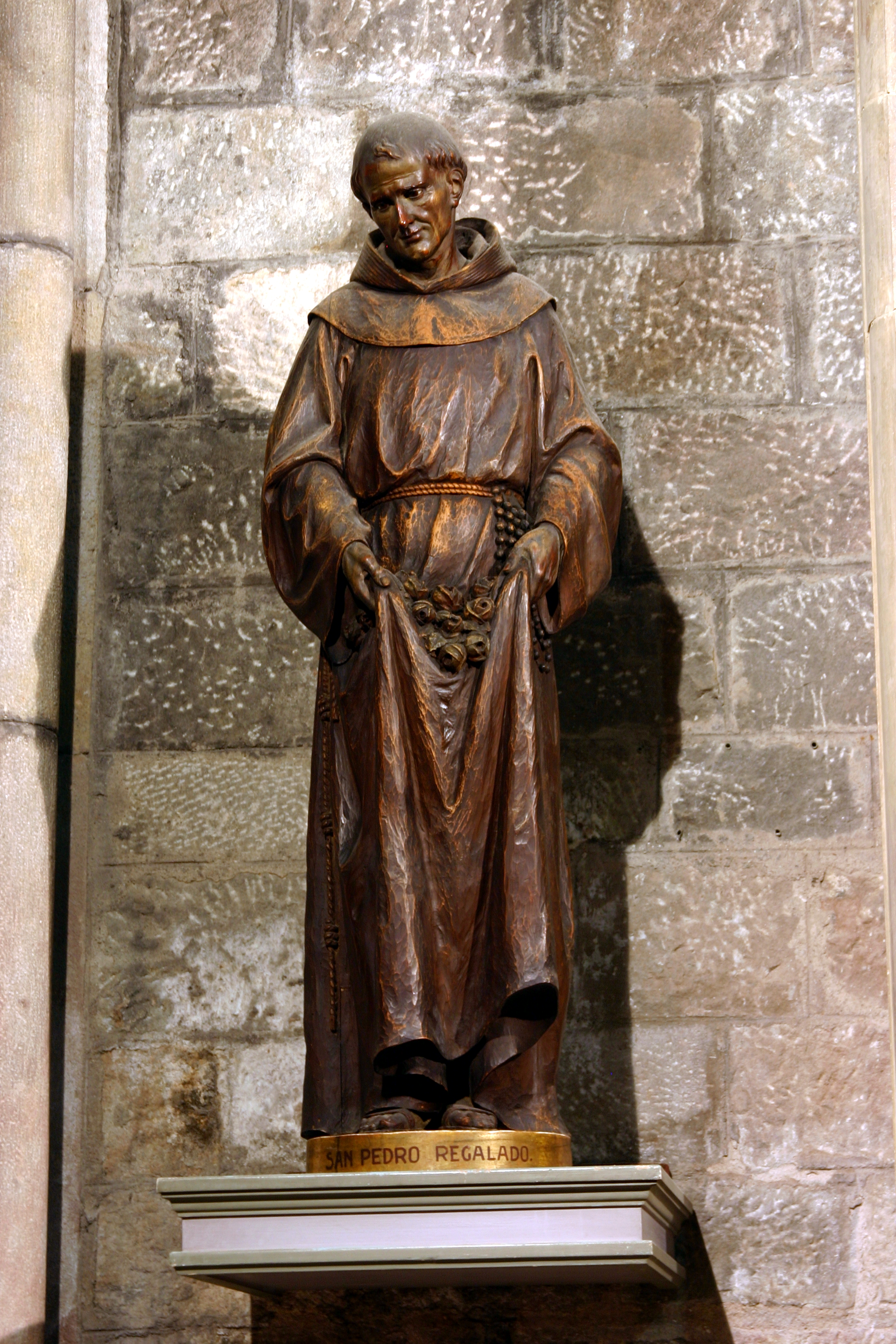
- Statue in the church of Santa Maria del Pi.
- Native name: Pedro Regalado y de la Constanilla
- Church: Catholic Church

Orders
- Ordination: 1412

Personal details
- Born: 1390 Valladolid, Burgos, Spain
- Died: 30 March 1456 (aged 65–66) La Aguilera, Burgos, Spain

Sainthood
- Feast day: 13 May
- Venerated in: Catholic Church (Order of Friars Minor in Spain) & Archdiocese of Valladolid)
- Beatified: 11 March 1684; Saint Peter's Basilica, Papal States, by Pope Innocent XI
- Canonized: 29 June 1746; Saint Peter's Basilica, Papal States, by Pope Benedict XIV
- Attributes: Flames bursting from his heart
- Patronage: Valladolid & Archdiocese of Valladolid

Peter Regalado y de la Constanilla, O.F.M. (Spanish: Pedro Regalado; Latin Regalatus), known as Peter of Valladolid during his lifetime (1390 – 30 March 1456), was a Spanish Friar Minor and Catholic priest who was a noted itinerant preacher and major reformer of his Order. He has been declared a saint by the Catholic Church.

== Life ==
Regalado was born at Valladolid, about 1390, to the nobleman Pedro Regalado and his wife, Maria de la Costanilla. After losing his father in his early youth, he was piously educated by his mother, who often prayed at the nearby Franciscan church, where he began to serve at the daily Mass.

At the age of ten years Regalado begged to be admitted into the Friars Minor who administered the church. This favor was granted him three years later, at the legal age of 14, in the friary of his native town. In 1404, however, the community was visited by Pedro de Villacreces, a fellow friar who in 1397 had begun to lead a movement to reform the life of the Order in Spain to reflect more closely the fervor and simplicity of life of their founder, Francis of Assisi, in a movement known as the Observance. Regalado became one of his first disciples.

In the newly founded friary at La Aguilera, the headquarters of the reform community, Regalado found a life of solitude, prayer, and poverty. In 1415, he became guardian of the friary; upon the death of Villacreces (1422), the community at Tribulos (del Abroyo) as well. He effected many important reforms in the discipline of its Spanish friaries. Regalado fasted almost all of the year from meat and dairy products. In 1442, he was appointed leader of all the Spanish friars in the reform group. He was known for his charity to the poor.

After Regalado's death on March 31, 1456, his grave became a place of pilgrimage. When his body was exhumed 36 years later, at the insistence of Queen Isabel I, it was found to be incorrupt and was placed in a more precious tomb.

Regalado was beatified by Pope Innocent XI on 11 March 1684, and canonized by Pope Benedict XIV on 29 June 1746. He was then named patron saint of both his native city and of its diocese

Regalado's feast day is celebrated on 13 May, the day of the translation of his body. In art he is represented with flames bursting from his heart.
