= Matanza de Soria =

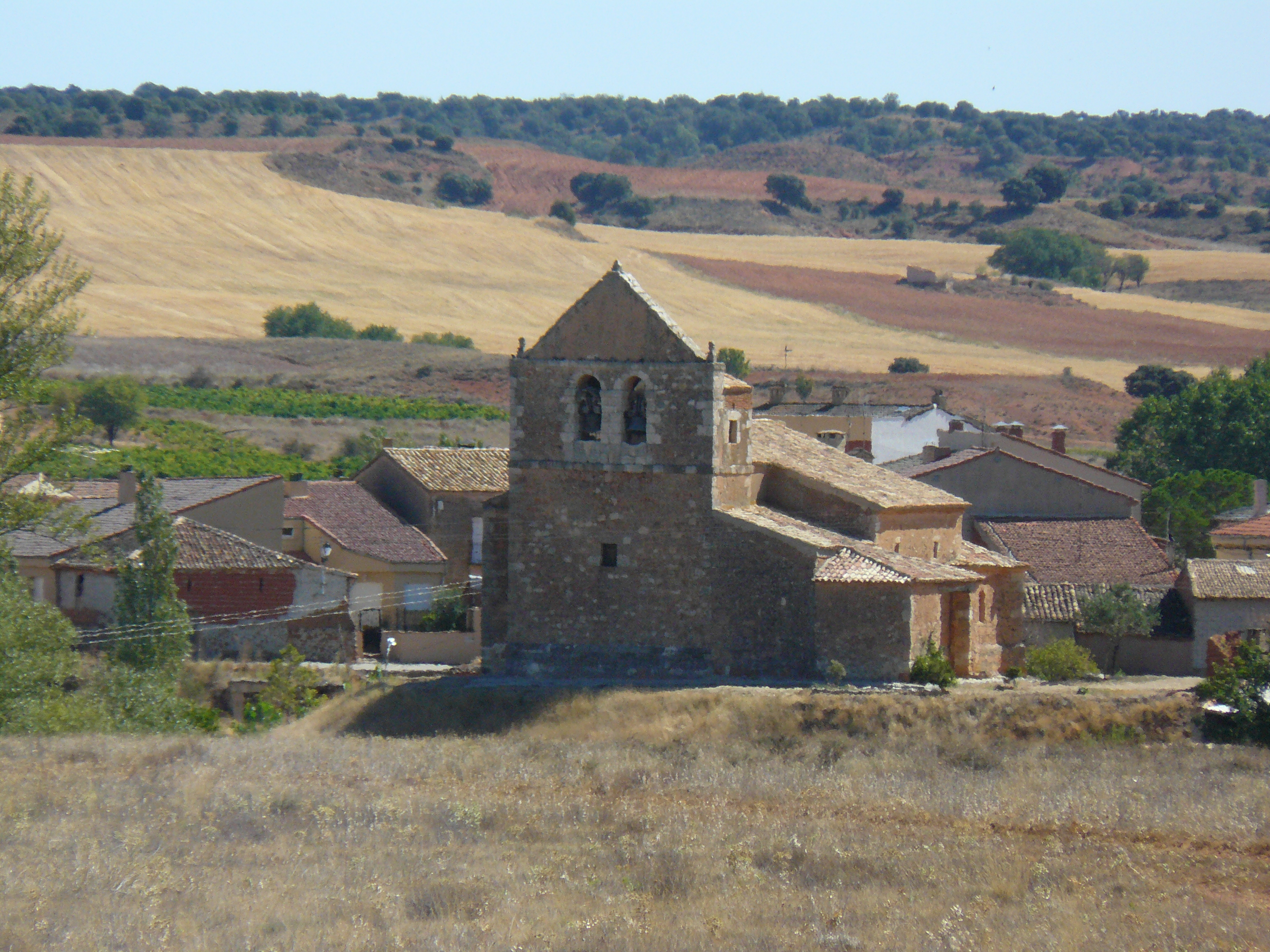
- View of the village

- Location in Spain
- Coordinates: 41°38′04″N 3°12′46″W
- Country: Spain
- Province: Soria
- Municipality: San Esteban de Gormaz
- Comarca: Comarca de Burgo de Osma
- Elevation: 914 m (2,999 ft)

Population (2017)
  - Total: 37
- Time zone: UTC+1 (CET)
  - Summer (DST): UTC+2 (CEST)
- Website: sanestebandegormaz.org

Matanza de Soria is a village in Soria, Spain. It is part of the municipality of San Esteban de Gormaz. The village had 62 inhabitants in 2000.
