= Soto de San Esteban =

- Location in Spain
- Coordinates: 41°34′54″N 3°16′50″W
- Country: Spain
- Province: Soria
- Municipality: San Esteban de Gormaz
- Comarca: Comarca de Burgo de Osma
- Elevation: 847 m (2,779 ft)

Population (2017)
  - Total: 91
- Time zone: UTC+1 (CET)
  - Summer (DST): UTC+2 (CEST)

Soto de San Esteban is a village in Soria, Spain. It is part of the municipality of San Esteban de Gormaz. The village had 116 inhabitants in 2010.
