= Pedraja de San Esteban =

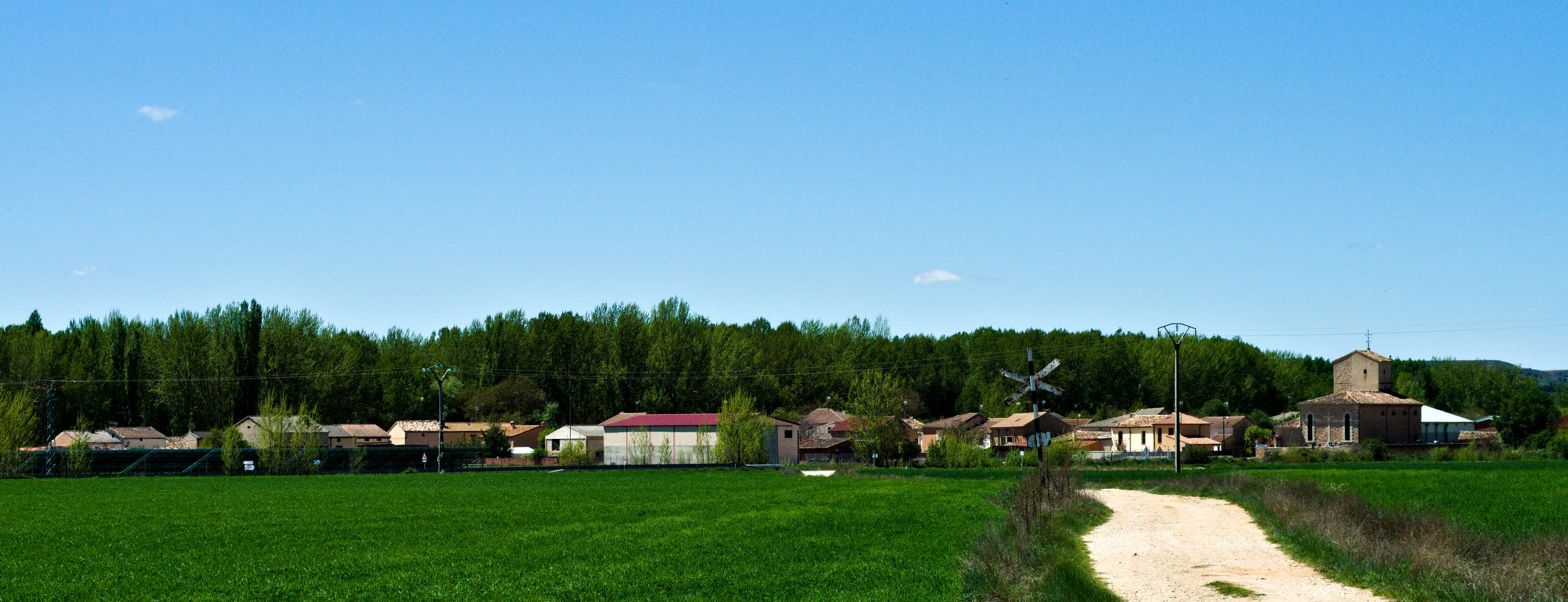

- Location in Spain
- Coordinates: 41°32′58″N 3°08′47″W
- Country: Spain
- Province: Soria
- Municipality: San Esteban de Gormaz
- Comarca: Comarca de Burgo de Osma
- Elevation: 862 m (2,828 ft)

Population (2016)
  - Total: 15
- Time zone: UTC+1 (CET)
  - Summer (DST): UTC+2 (CEST)
- Website: sanestebandegormaz.org

Pedraja de San Esteban is a village in Soria, Spain. It is part of the municipality of San Esteban de Gormaz. The village had 38 inhabitants in 2000.
