= Villálvaro =

- Location in Spain
- Coordinates: 41°39′40″N 3°13′02″W
- Country: Spain
- Province: Soria
- Municipality: San Esteban de Gormaz
- Comarca: Comarca de Burgo de Osma
- Elevation: 918 m (3,012 ft)

Population (2017)
  - Total: 123
- Time zone: UTC+1 (CET)
  - Summer (DST): UTC+2 (CEST)

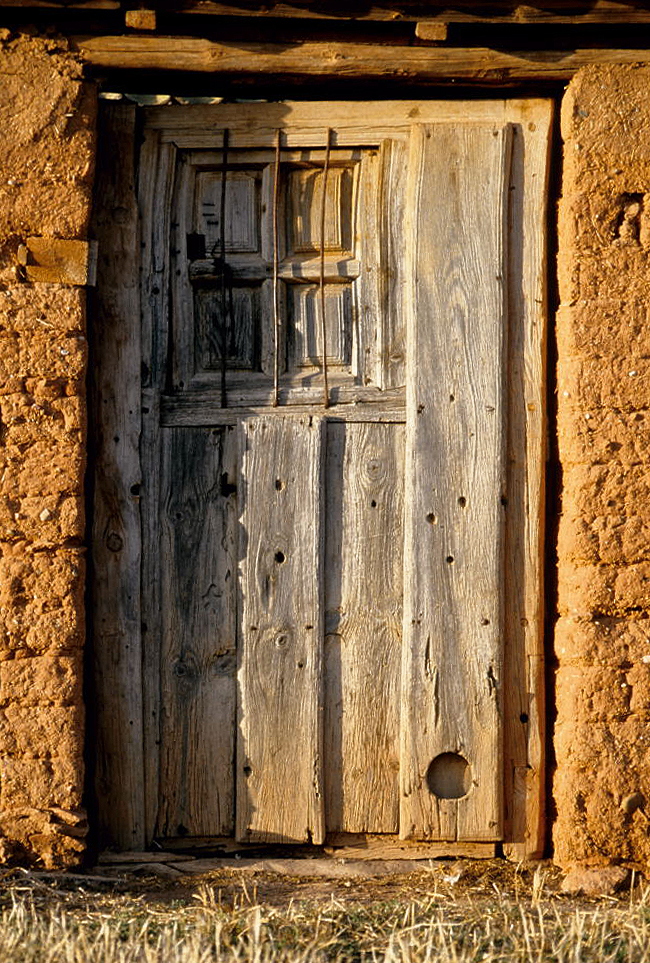
A door with another cat door. Villálvaro, San Esteban de Gormaz, Soria, Castile and León, Spain.

Villálvaro is a village in Soria, Spain. It is part of the municipality of San Esteban de Gormaz. The village had 156 inhabitants in 2010.
