= Piquera de San Esteban =

Coordinates: 41.5075°N 3.2581°W

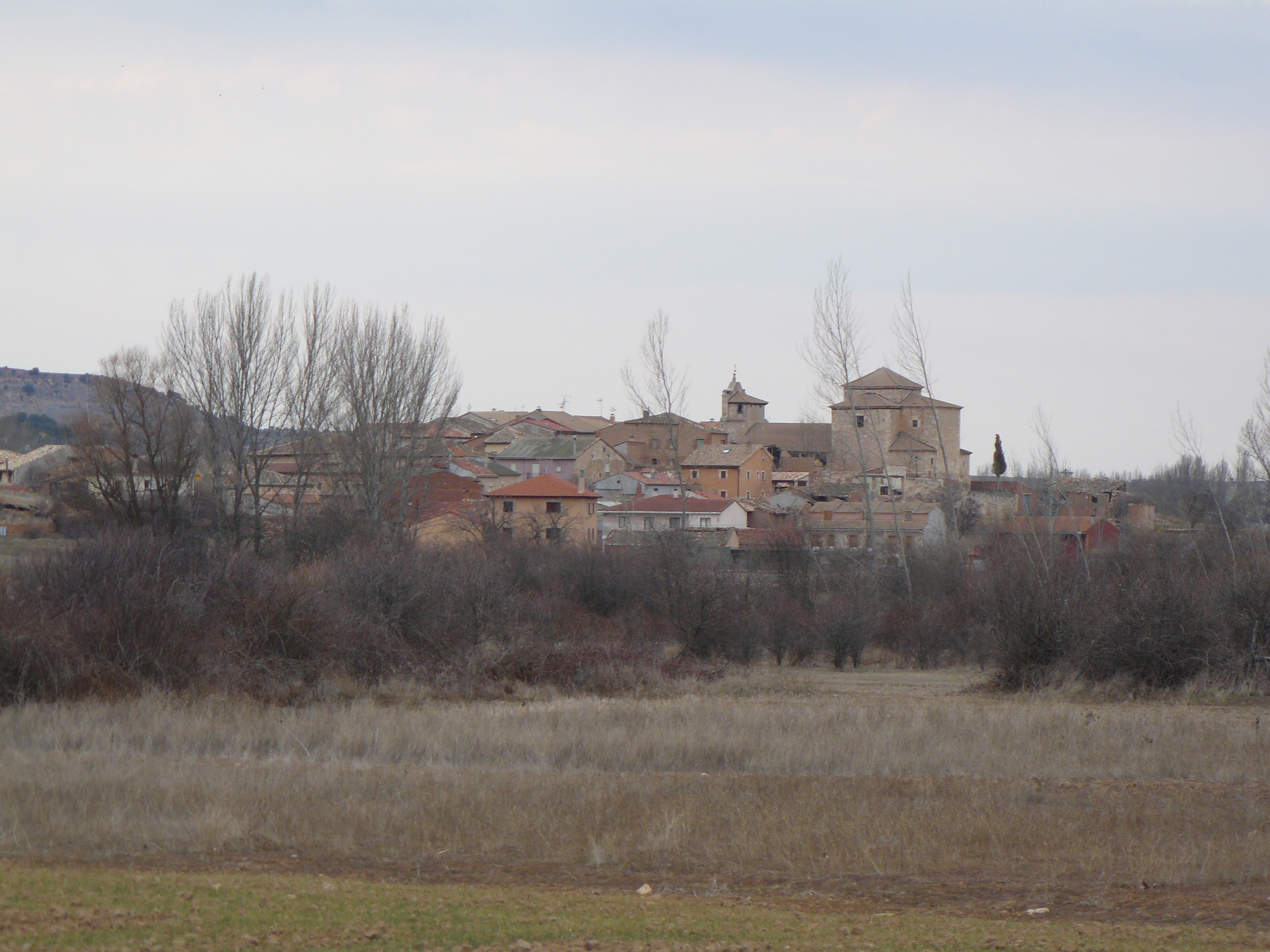
- View of the village
- Interactive map of Piquera de San Esteban
- Country: Spain
- Province: Soria
- Municipality: San Esteban de Gormaz
- Comarca: Comarca de Burgo de Osma
- Elevation: 899 m (2,949 ft)

Population (2017)
  - Total: 24
- Time zone: UTC+1 (CET)
  - Summer (DST): UTC+2 (CEST)
- Website: sanestebandegormaz.org

Piquera de San Esteban is a village in Soria, Spain. It is part of the municipality of San Esteban de Gormaz. The village had 50 inhabitants in 2001.
