= Autovía A-11 =

Motorway from Soria to San Martín del Pedroso (Spain)

Autovía A-11
- Autovía del Duero
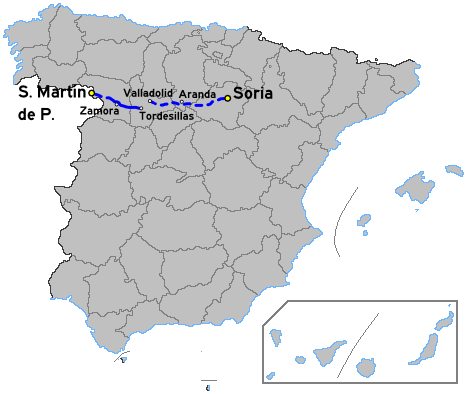

Route information
- Part of E82
- Length: 383 km (238 mi)

Major junctions
- From: Soria
- To: San Martín del Pedroso (Zamora)

Location
- Country: Spain

Highway system
- Highways in Spain; Autopistas and autovías; National Roads

The Autovía A-11 (also known as Autovía del Duero) is a highway in Spain.

It runs between Soria and Quintanilha in Portugal in the Rio Duero valley. It supersedes the N-122.

It is currently under construction.
