= Rejas de San Esteban =

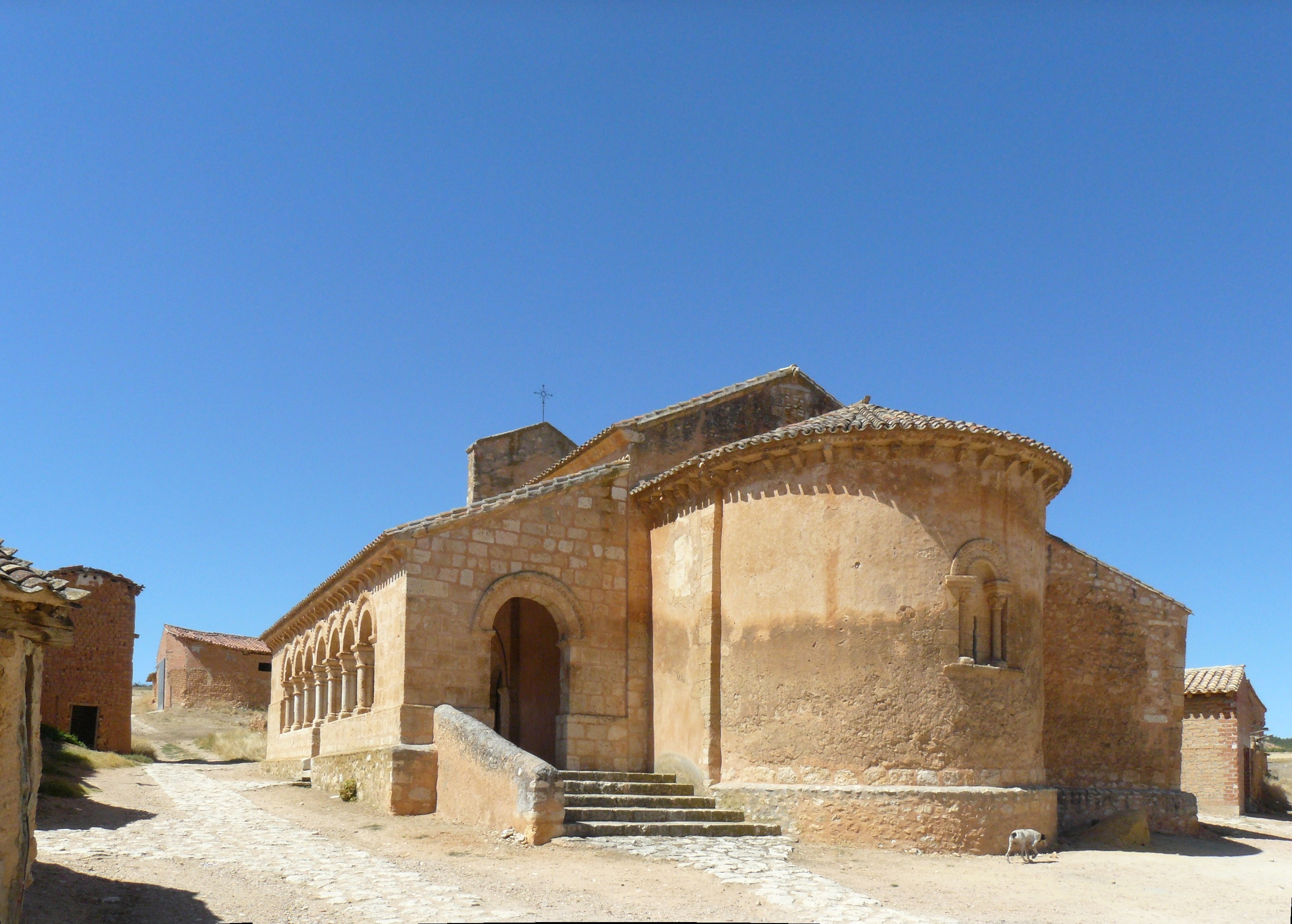
- Church of San Martín in Rejas

- Location in Spain
- Coordinates: 41°37′18″N 3°15′42″W
- Country: Spain
- Province: Soria
- Municipality: San Esteban de Gormaz
- Comarca: Comarca de Burgo de Osma
- Elevation: 873 m (2,864 ft)

Population (2010)
  - Total: 58
- Time zone: UTC+1 (CET)
  - Summer (DST): UTC+2 (CEST)
- Website: sanestebandegormaz.org

Rejas de San Esteban or Rejas is a village in Soria, Spain. It is part of the municipality of San Esteban de Gormaz. The village had 153 inhabitants in 1981.

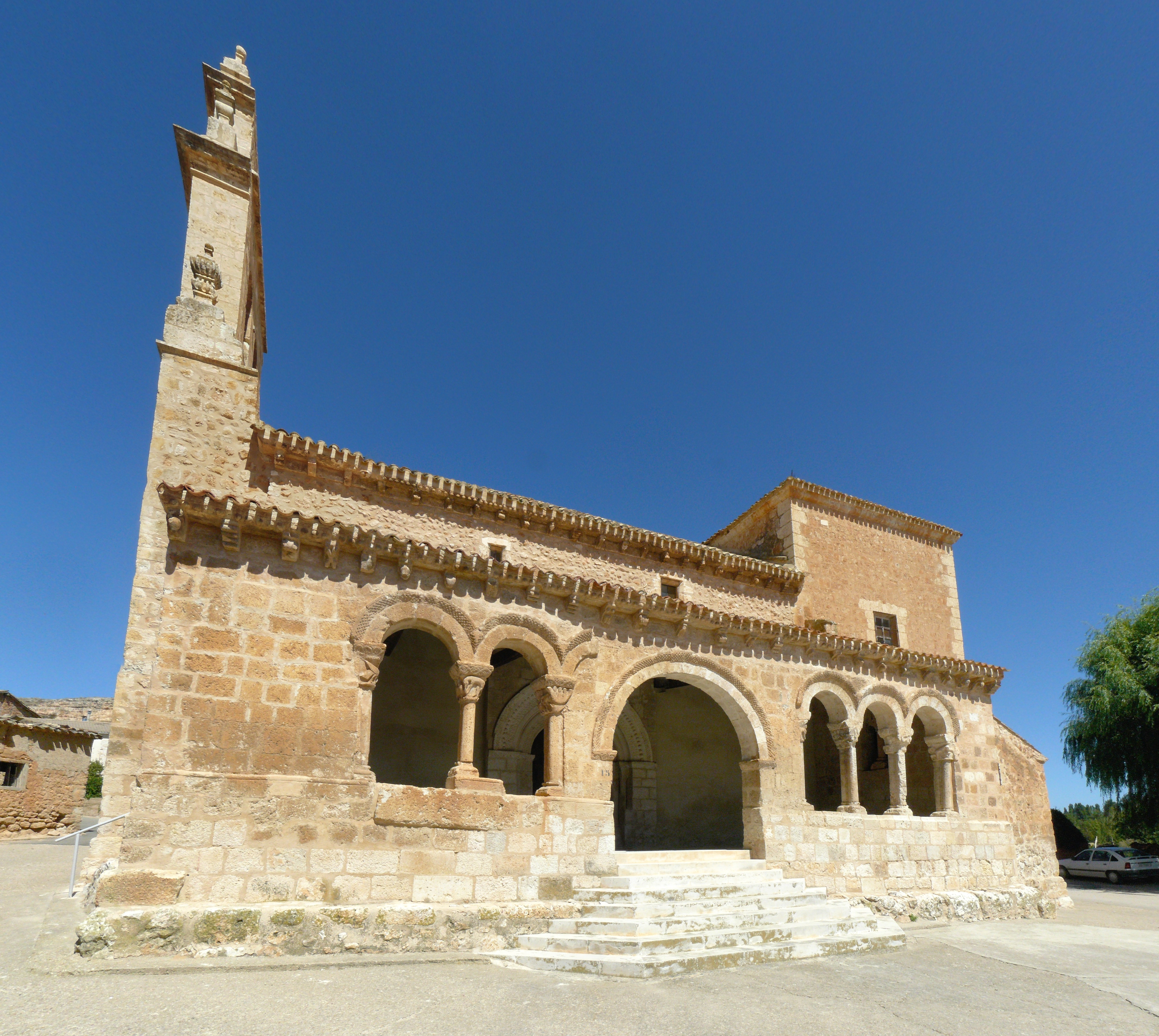
Church of San Gines.
