= Torraño =

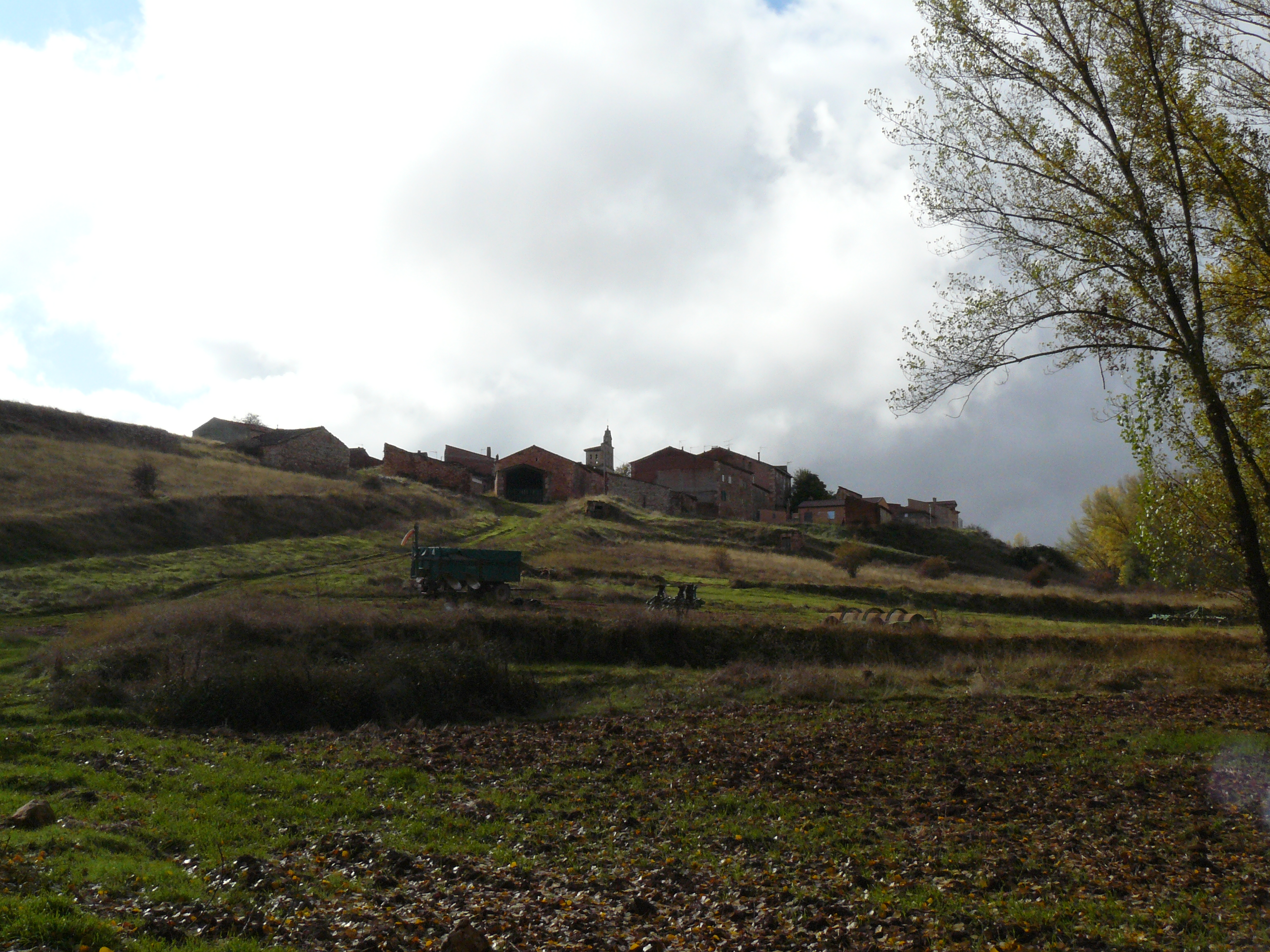

- Location in Spain
- Coordinates: 41°25′51″N 3°19′31″W
- Country: Spain
- Province: Soria
- Municipality: San Esteban de Gormaz
- Comarca: Comarca de Burgo de Osma
- Elevation: 1,032 m (3,386 ft)

Population (2010)
  - Total: 13

Torraño is a village in Soria, Spain. It is part of the municipality of San Esteban de Gormaz.

== History and demographics ==
The village was listed as having 112 inhabitants and was part of the municipality of Ayllón during the 1789 Census of Floridablanca. In 1842 there were 20 homes and 86 inhabitants.

In the census of 1842 there were 20 homes and 86 neighbors. Since 1972 the village has belonged to the municipality of San Esteban de Gormaz. At the time of the 1981 census there were 30 residents and in 2010 there were 13, 9 males and 4 females.

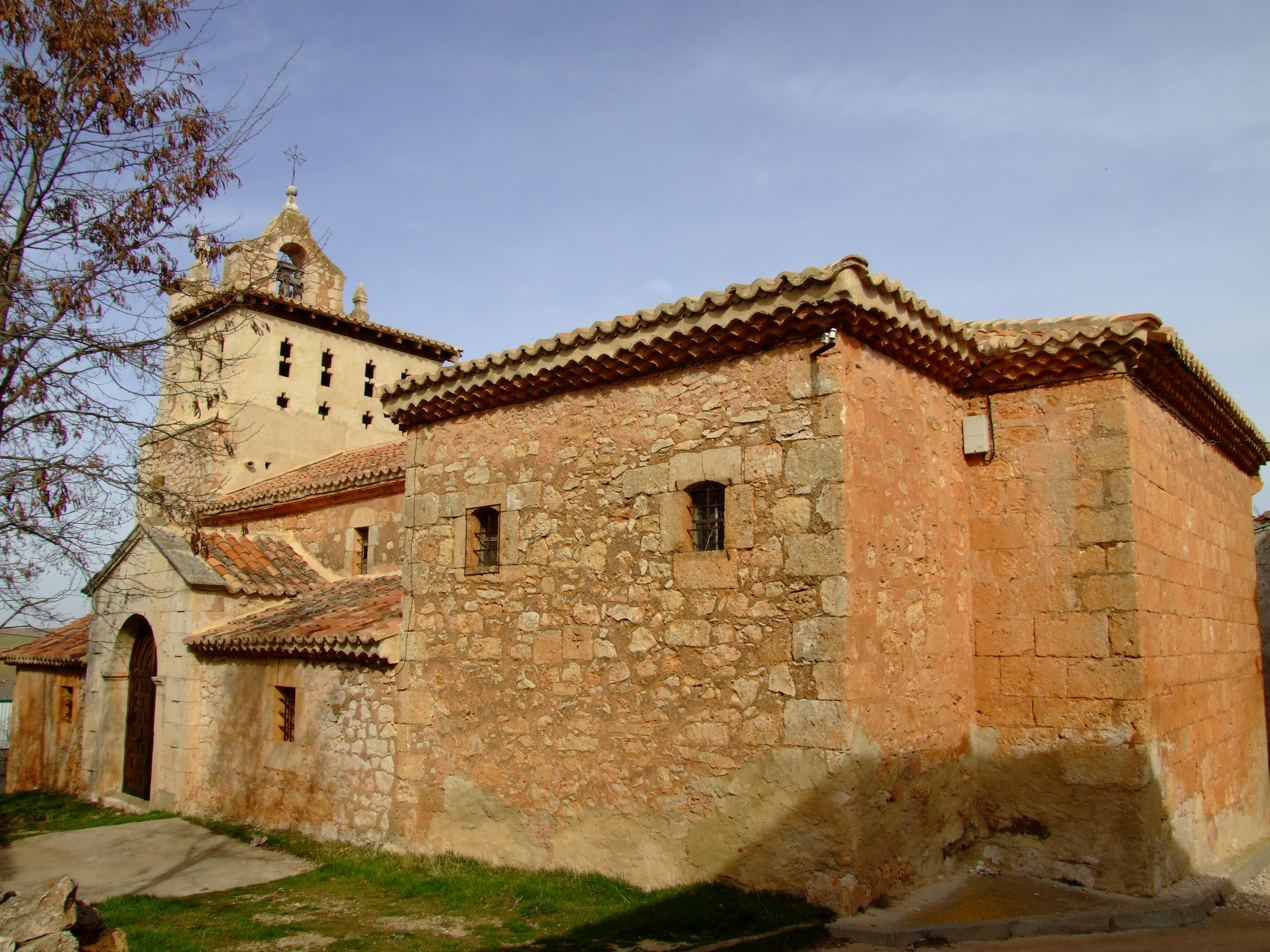
Church of St. Mary Magdalene in Torraño
