= Matalebreras =

- Municipality
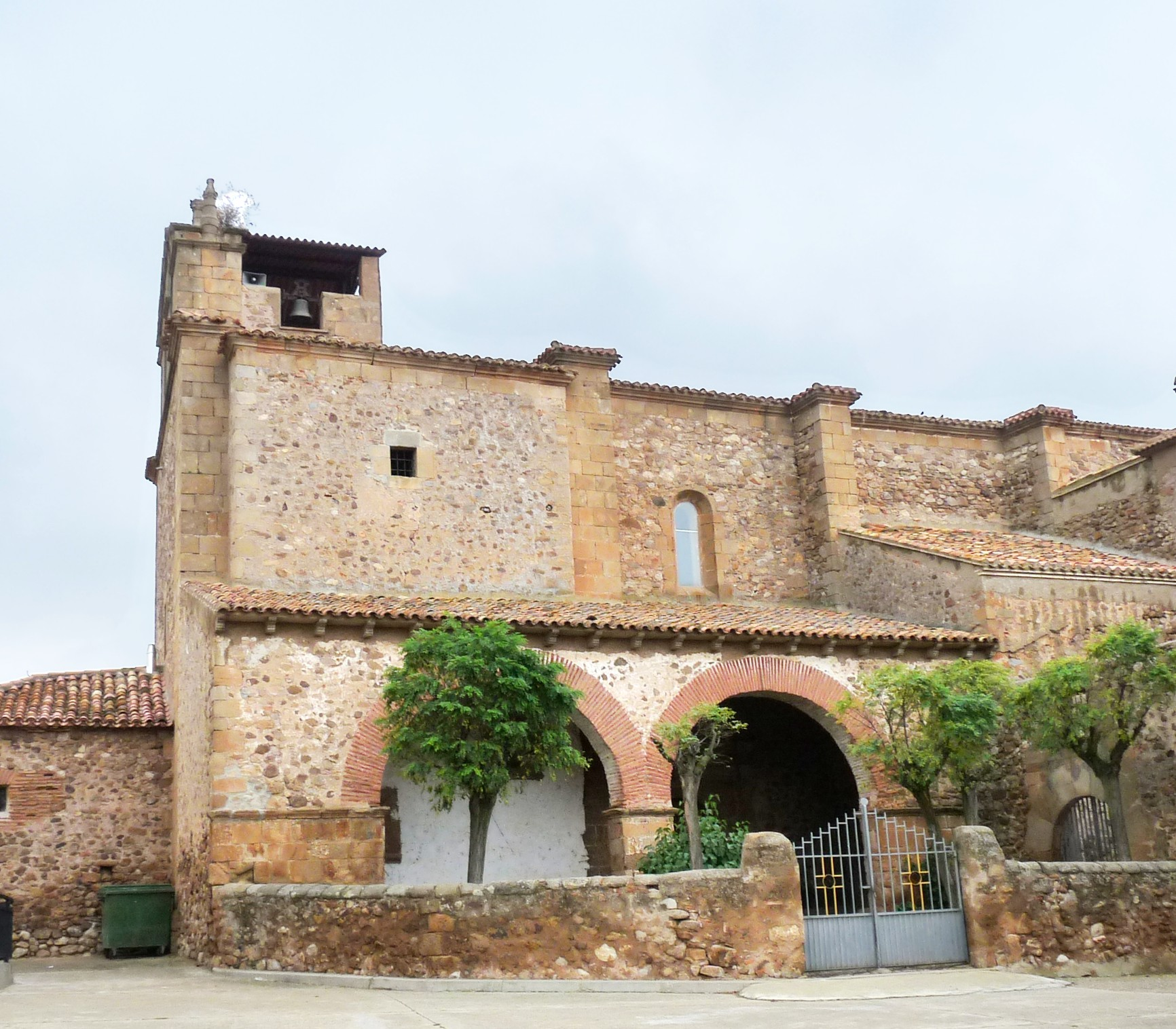
- The church of San Pedro in Matalebreras

- A map of Matalebreras in Soria

- Location in Spain. Matalebreras (Spain)
- Coordinates: 41°50′26″N 2°02′48″W
- Country: Spain
- Autonomous community: Castile and León
- Province: Soria
- Municipality: Matalebreras

Area
  - Total: 41.63 km^{2} (16.07 sq mi)
- Elevation: 995 m (3,264 ft)

Population (2025-01-01)
  - Total: 81
  - Density: 1.9/km^{2} (5.0/sq mi)
- Time zone: UTC+1 (CET)
  - Summer (DST): UTC+2 (CEST)
- Website: Official website

Matalebreras is a municipality located in the province of Soria, Castile and León, Spain. In 2019, (INE) the municipality had a total population of 66 inhabitants.

The municipality is made up of the localities of Matalebreras and Montenegro de Ágreda.
