= Quintanilla de Arriba =

Coordinates: 41°37′N 4°13′W

Quintanilla de Arriba, Spain
- Flag Coat of arms

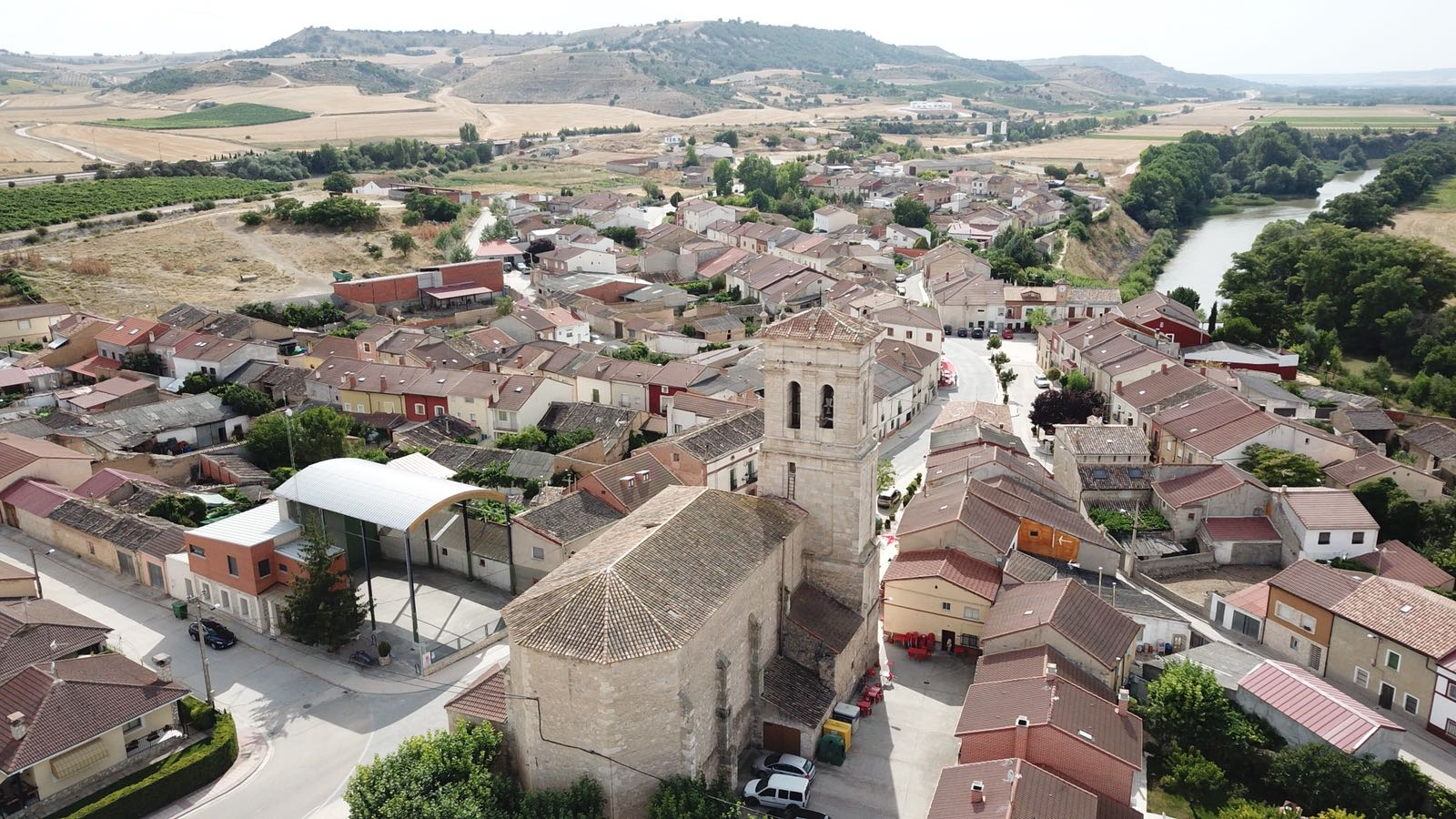
- view
- Country: Spain
- Autonomous community: Castile and León
- Province: Valladolid
- Municipality: Quintanilla de Arriba

Area
  - Total: 28 km^{2} (11 sq mi)
- Elevation: 740 m (2,430 ft)

Population (2025-01-01)
  - Total: 161
  - Density: 5.8/km^{2} (15/sq mi)
- Time zone: UTC+1 (CET)
  - Summer (DST): UTC+2 (CEST)

Quintanilla de Arriba is a municipality located in the province of Valladolid, Castile and León, Spain. According to the 2017 census (INE), the municipality has a population of 155 inhabitants.

== See also ==
- Cuisine of the province of Valladolid
