= Velilla de San Esteban =

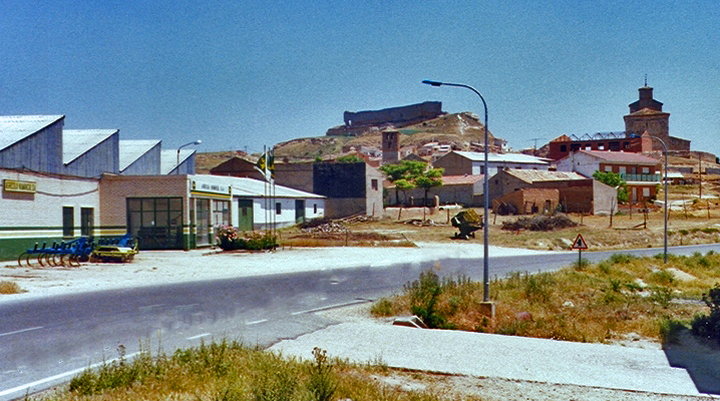
- Velilla de San Esteban

- Location in Spain
- Coordinates: 41°35′19″N 3°18′31″W
- Country: Spain
- Province: Soria
- Municipality: San Esteban de Gormaz
- Comarca: Comarca de Burgo de Osma
- Elevation: 850 m (2,790 ft)

Population (2017)
  - Total: 10
- Time zone: UTC+1 (CET)
  - Summer (DST): UTC+2 (CEST)
- Website: sanestebandegormaz.org

Velilla de San Esteban is a village in Soria, Spain. It is part of the municipality of San Esteban de Gormaz. The village had 37 inhabitants in 2000 and just 10 in 2017.
