= Torremocha de Ayllón =

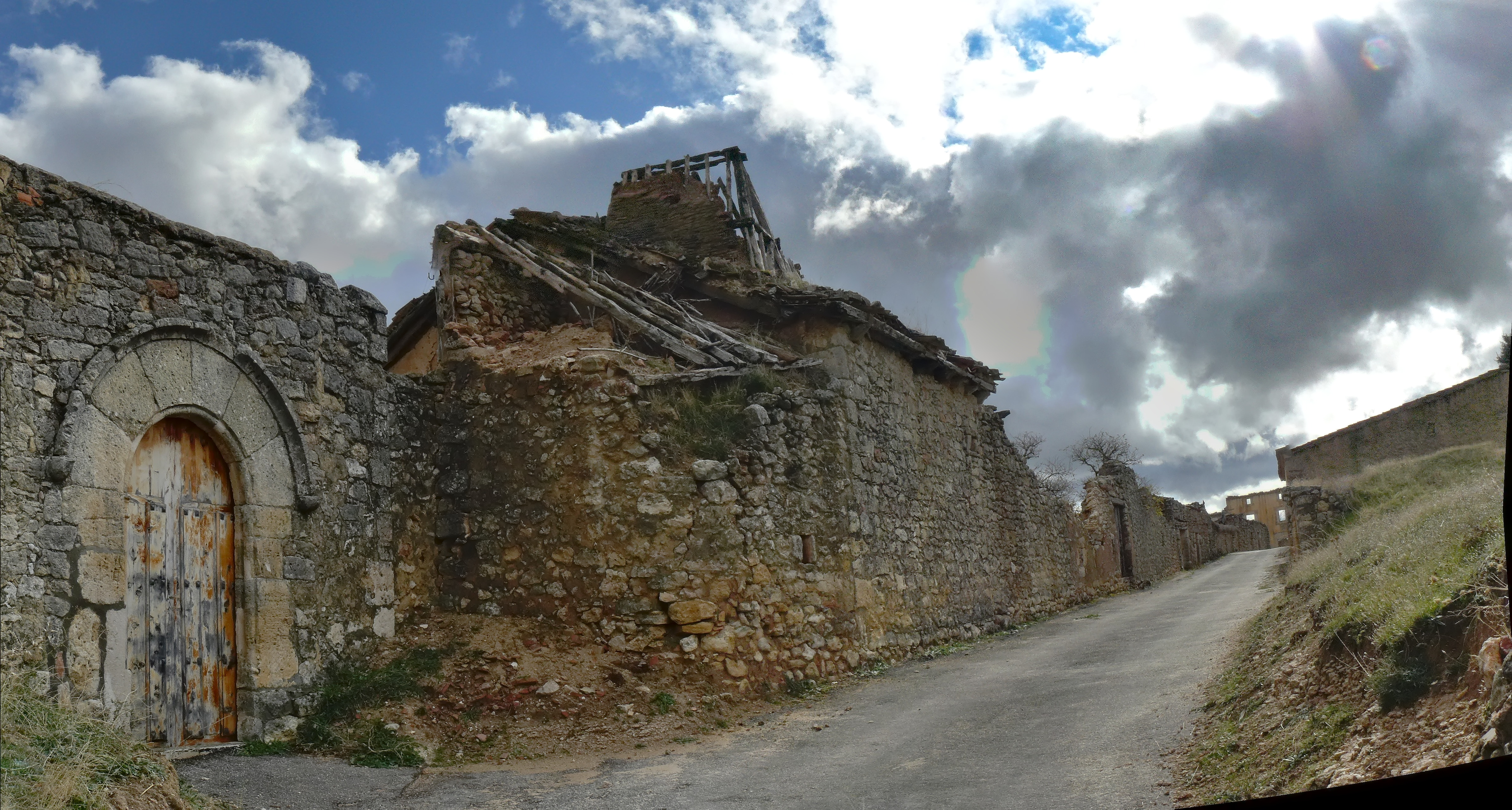
- An abandoned street in Torremocha de Ayllón

- Location in Spain
- Coordinates: 41°26′49″N 3°15′04″W
- Country: Spain
- Province: Soria
- Municipality: San Esteban de Gormaz
- Comarca: Comarca de Burgo de Osma
- Elevation: 1,021 m (3,350 ft)

Population (2017)
  - Total: 14
- Time zone: UTC+1 (CET)
  - Summer (DST): UTC+2 (CEST)
- Website: sanestebandegormaz.org

Torremocha de Ayllón is a village in Soria, Spain. It is part of the municipality of San Esteban de Gormaz.
