= Villaciervos =

- Municipality
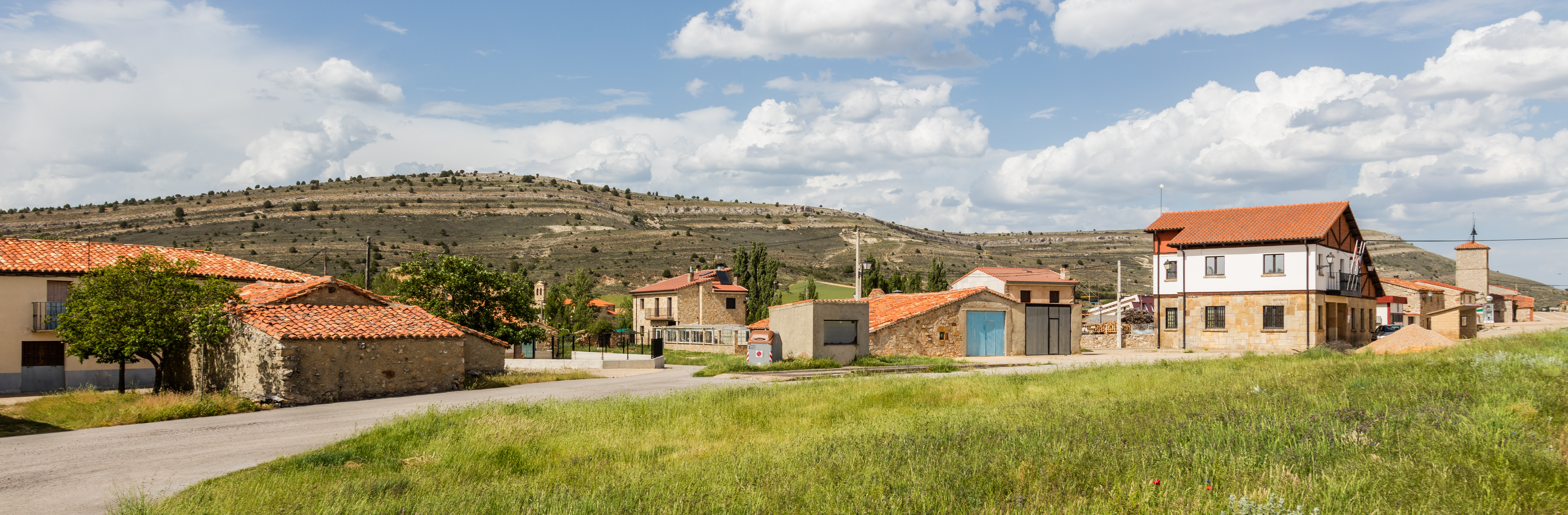

- Location within Castile and León Location within Spain
- Coordinates: 41°45′45″N 2°37′36″W
- Country: Spain
- Autonomous community: Castile and León
- Province: Soria
- Municipality: Villaciervos

Area
  - Total: 81.34 km^{2} (31.41 sq mi)

Population (2025-01-01)
  - Total: 86
  - Density: 1.1/km^{2} (2.7/sq mi)
- Time zone: UTC+1 (CET)
  - Summer (DST): UTC+2 (CEST)
- Website: Official website

Villaciervos is a municipality located in the province of Soria, Castile and León, Spain. According to the 2004 census (INE), the municipality had a population of 117 inhabitants.
