= Aldealpozo =

- Municipality
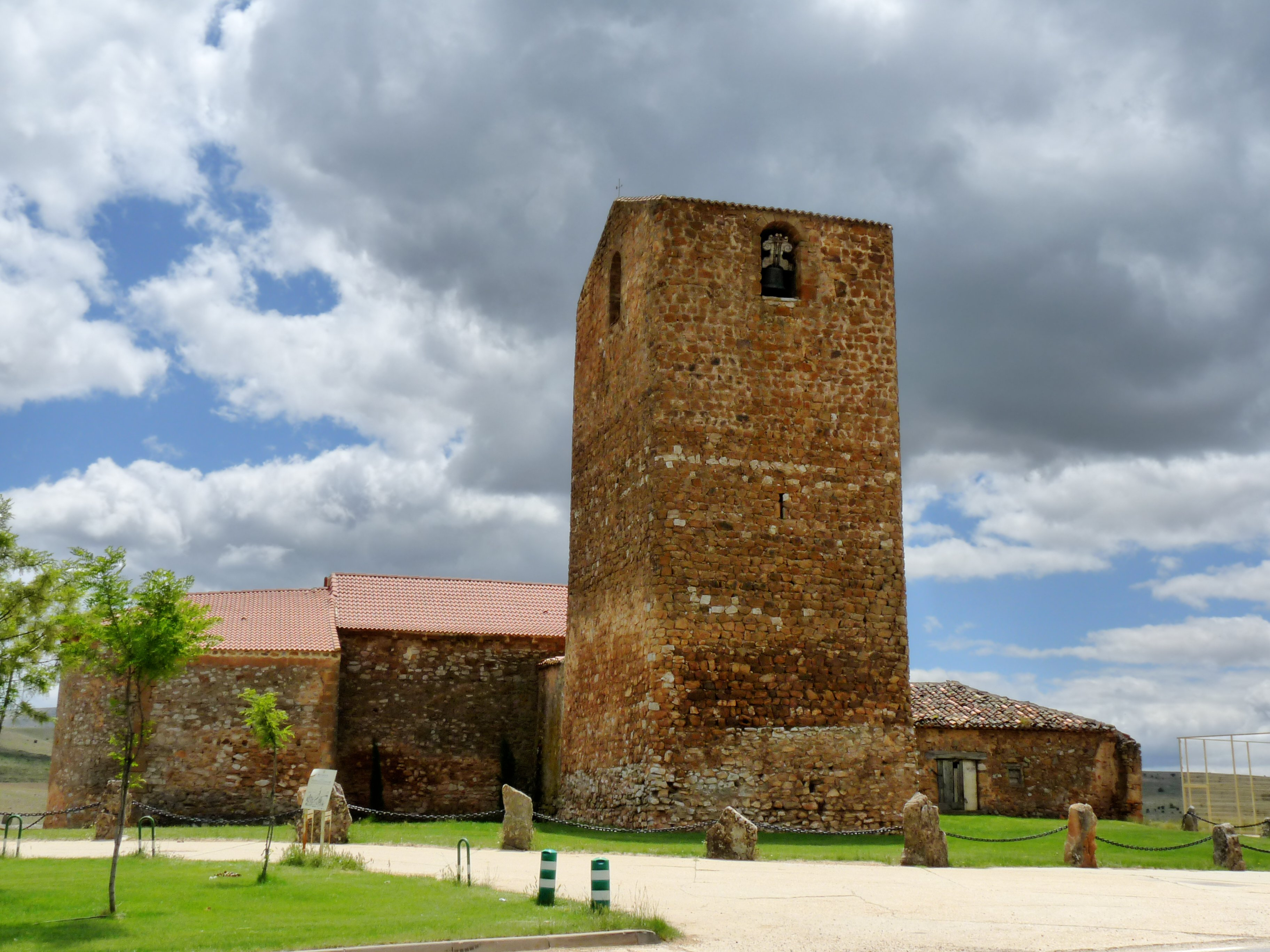
- Iglesia de San Juan Bautista, Aldealpozo

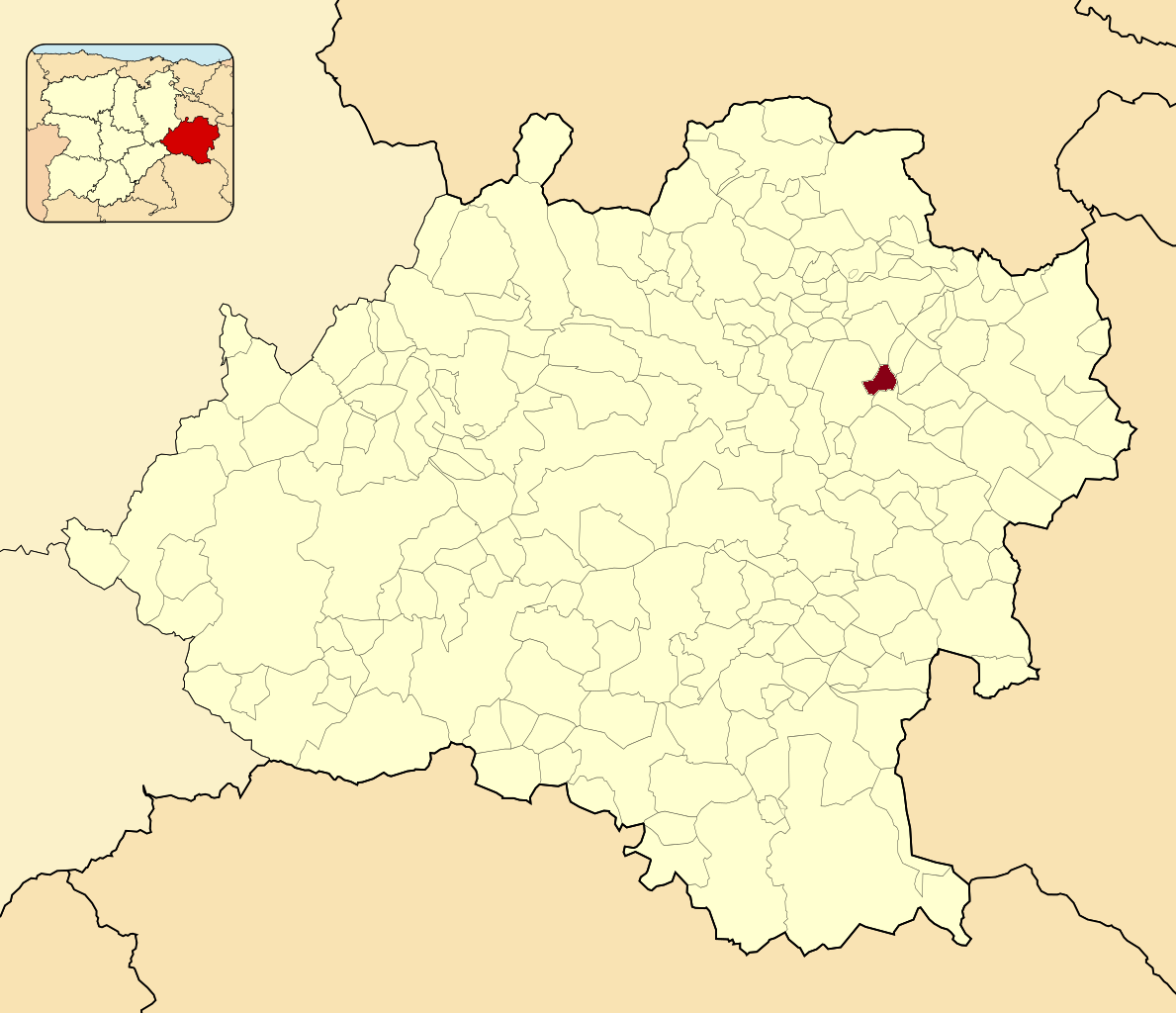
- Municipal location in the Province of Soria.

- Location in Spain Aldealpozo (Spain)
- Coordinates: 41°46′58″N 2°12′19″W
- Country: Spain
- Autonomous community: Castilla y León
- Province: Soria
- Comarca: Campo de Gómara

Government
  - Alcalde: María Luisa Morales Carramiñana (2015-) (PP)

Area
  - Total: 11.87 km^{2} (4.58 sq mi)
- Elevation: 1,053 m (3,455 ft)

Population (2025-01-01)
  - Total: 18
  - Density: 1.52/km^{2} (3.9/sq mi)
- Time zone: UTC+1 (CET)
  - Summer (DST): UTC+2 (CEST)
- Postal code: 42
- Website: Official website

Aldealpozo is a municipality located in the province of Soria, in the autonomous region Castile and León, in Spain. As of 2018 it had a population of 18 people.
