= San Esteban de Gormaz =

- Municipality
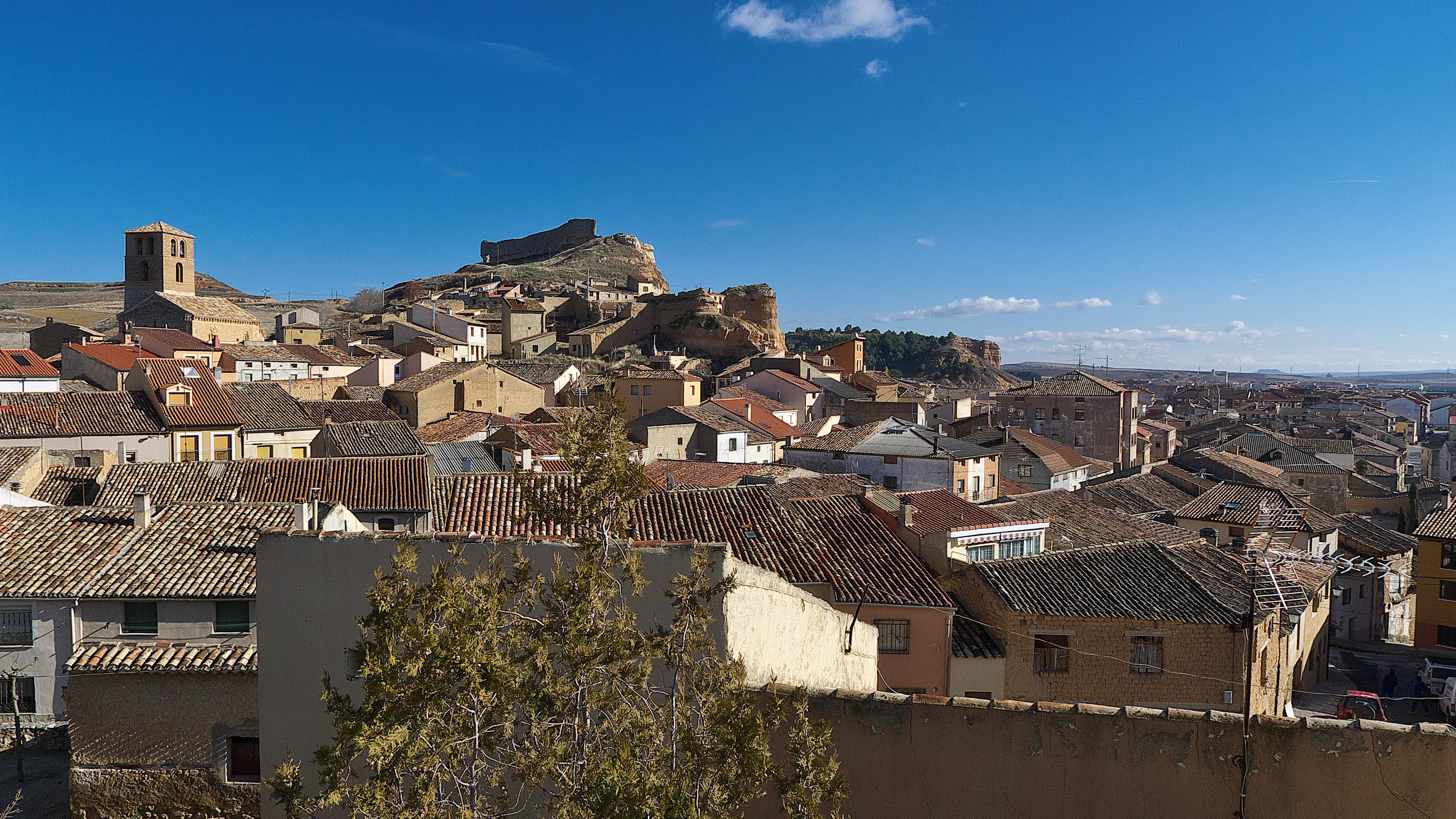

- Flag Coat of arms

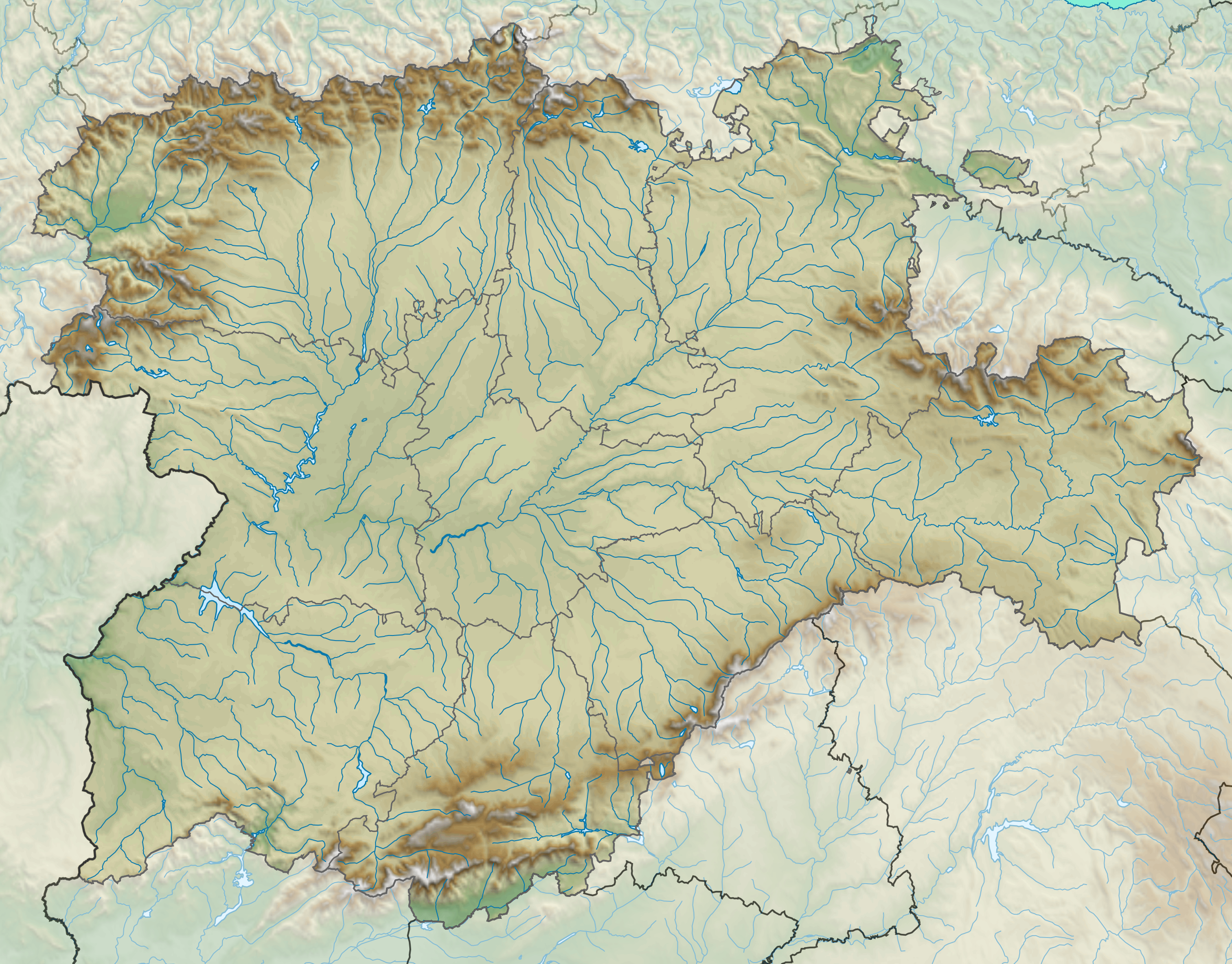
- Location within Spain Location within Castile and León
- Coordinates: 41°34′24″N 3°12′18″W
- Country: Spain
- Autonomous community: Castile and León
- Province: Soria

Government
  - Mayor: María Luisa Aguilera Sastre (PSOE)

Area
  - Total: 406.71 km^{2} (157.03 sq mi)

Population (2025-01-01)
  - Total: 2,962
  - Density: 7.283/km^{2} (18.86/sq mi)
- Time zone: UTC+1 (CET)
  - Summer (DST): UTC+2 (CEST)
- Website: Official website

San Esteban de Gormaz is a municipality in the province of Soria in the autonomous community of Castile-Leon, Spain. Its population is approximately 3,500. The town is located in the Wool Route and the Way of the Cid, the route of the exile of the Cid.

The village lies between the bank of River Duero and a small hill, 70 km west of the capital of the province (Soria), 28 km from Tiermes and 45 km from Aranda de Duero.

The Arab Gormaz Castle is located nearby.

The zone where it is located has known settlements from prehistory.

Historically, both Roman and Arab, constructed establishments of which some heritage is conserved.

The Arabs considered it a very important Christian center. This caused it to become a military objective for 200 years, from the beginning of the construction of its castle by the Arabs in the ninth century (at which time the population was called Castromoro) until it fell finally into the hands of the kingdom of Castile. The innumerable fights that took place this time throughout were the reason so that this place located in the border of Castile consolidated as an urban nucleus.

In 1187 the first Cortes of Castile were celebrated in the town and its importance continued growing until the end of the thirteenth century, when it reached its maximum splendor. By this date it had 3000 inhabitants (120 knights), four parishes and two monasteries located outside the limits of the village.

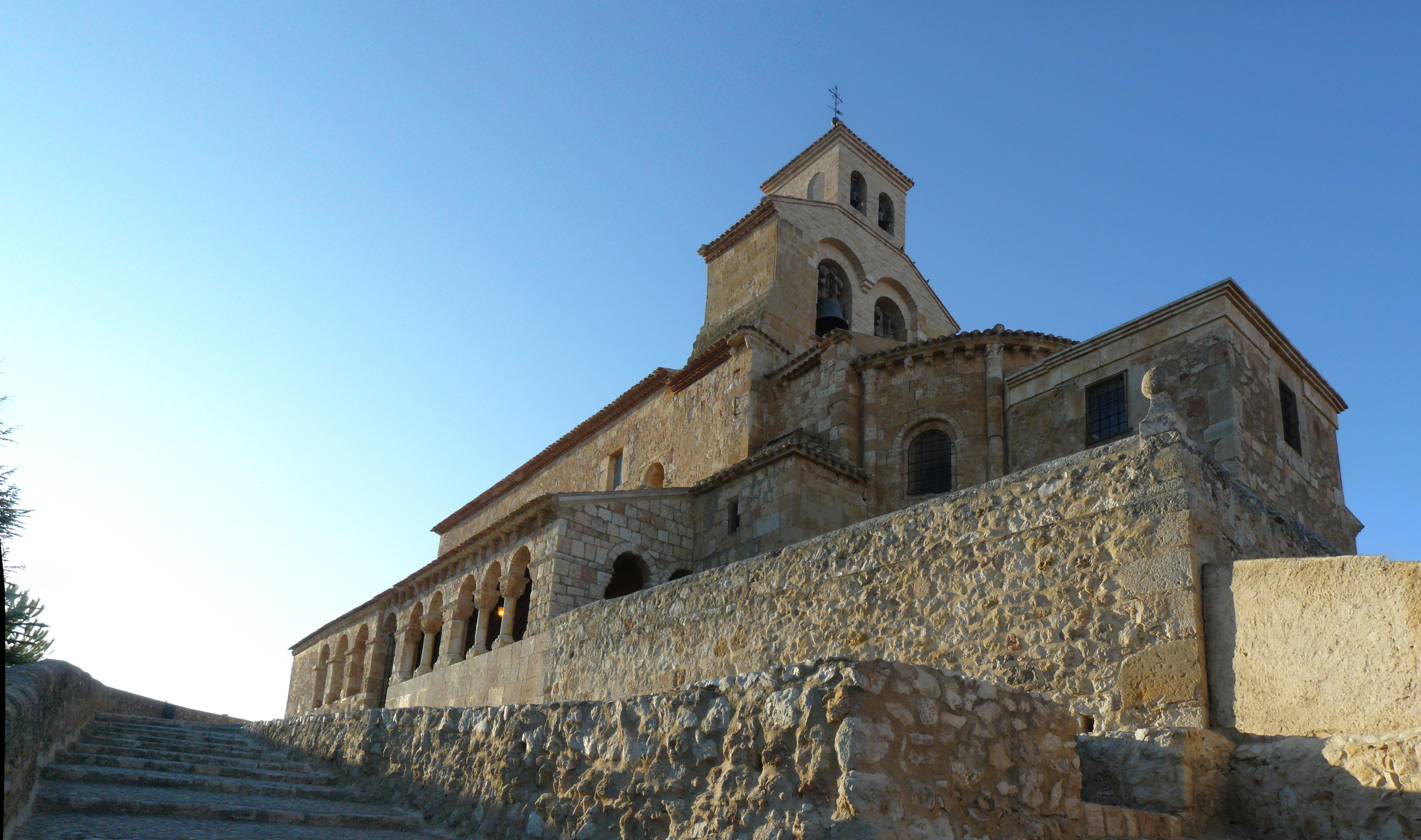

After the thirteenth century, the town decayed slowly. It experienced periods of great poverty and loss of population until the twentieth century. However, recently it has carried out an industrialization project that helped elevate the population to the levels that it had known in better times.

== List of settlements included in the municipality ==
- Aldea de San Esteban
- Atauta
- Inés
- Morcuera
- Matanza de Soria
- Olmillos
- Pedraja de San Esteban
- Peñalba de San Esteban
- Piquera de San Esteban
- Quintanas Rubias de Abajo
- Quintanas Rubias de Arriba
- Quintanilla de Tres Barrios
- Rejas de San Esteban
- Soto de San Esteban
- Torraño
- Torremocha de Ayllón
- Velilla de San Esteban
- Villálvaro
