= Torremocha de Jadraque =

Torremocha de Jadraque, Spain
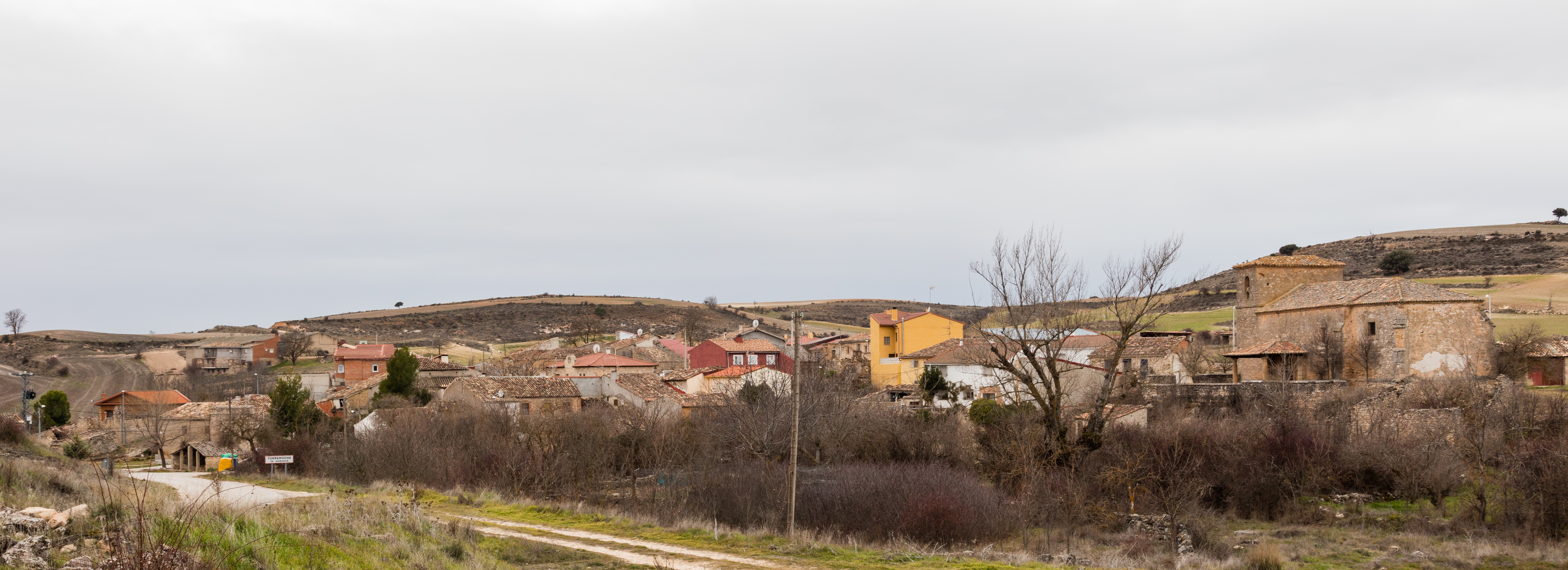

- Location within Province of Guadalajara Location within Castilla-La Mancha Location within Spain
- Coordinates: 41°01′13″N 2°53′53″W
- Country: Spain
- Autonomous community: Castile-La Mancha
- Province: Guadalajara
- Municipality: Torremocha de Jadraque

Area
  - Total: 11.17 km^{2} (4.31 sq mi)
- Elevation: 934 m (3,064 ft)

Population (2025-01-01)
  - Total: 23
  - Density: 2.1/km^{2} (5.3/sq mi)
- Time zone: UTC+1 (CET)
  - Summer (DST): UTC+2 (CEST)

Torremocha de Jadraque is a municipality located in the province of Guadalajara, Castile-La Mancha, Spain. According to the 2004 census (INE), the municipality had a population of 19 inhabitants.
