= La Aguilera =

Village in Burgos province, Spain

Coordinates: 41.732°N 3.770°W

- town
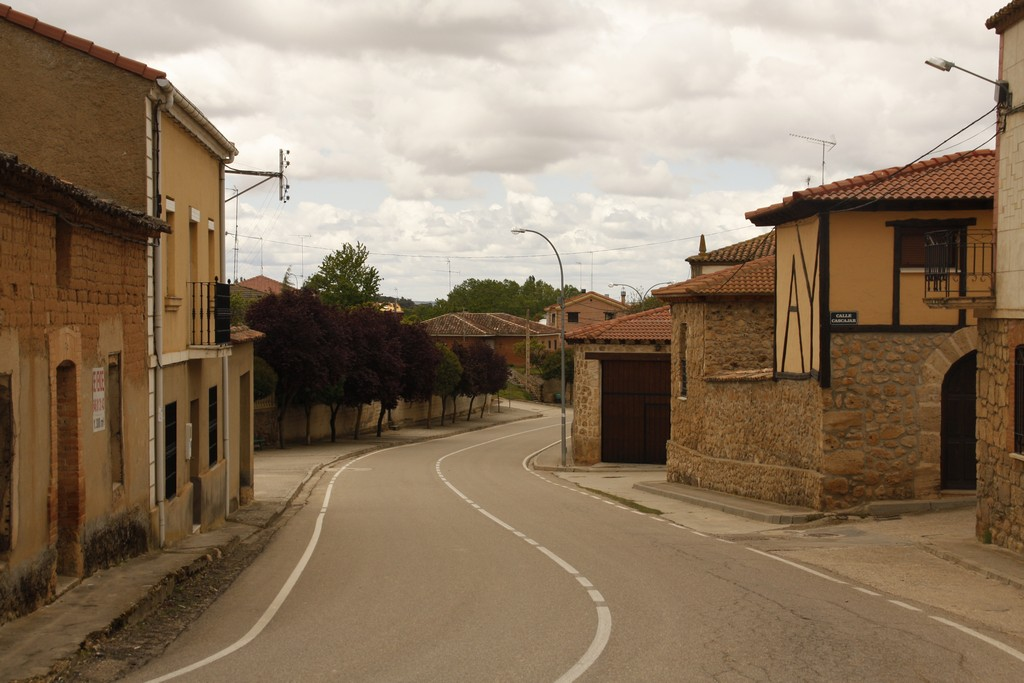
- View of La Aguilera, 2010
- Interactive map of La Aguilera
- Country: Spain
- Autonomous community: Castile and León
- Province: Burgos
- Comarca: Ribera del Duero
- Municipality: Aranda de Duero

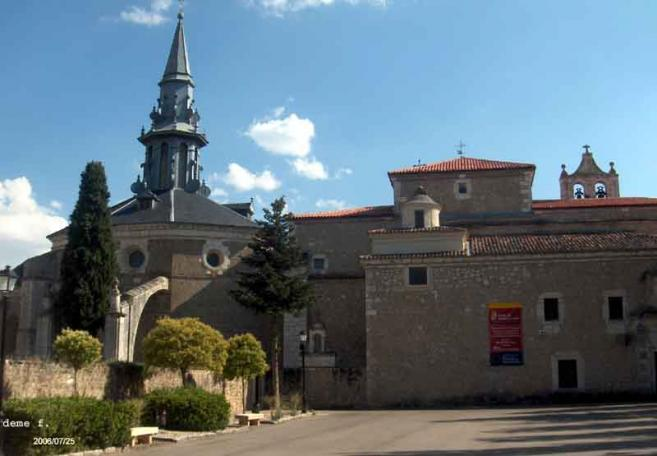
San Pedro Regalado shrine

La Aguilera is a small Spanish village about 7 km from Aranda de Duero in the province of Burgos, Castile and León. Wine cellars and "merenderos" (personal BBQ areas) built into the side of a hill overlook the village. It is located in the grape-growing region of the Ribera del Duero wine region.
