= Villar del Campo =

- Municipality
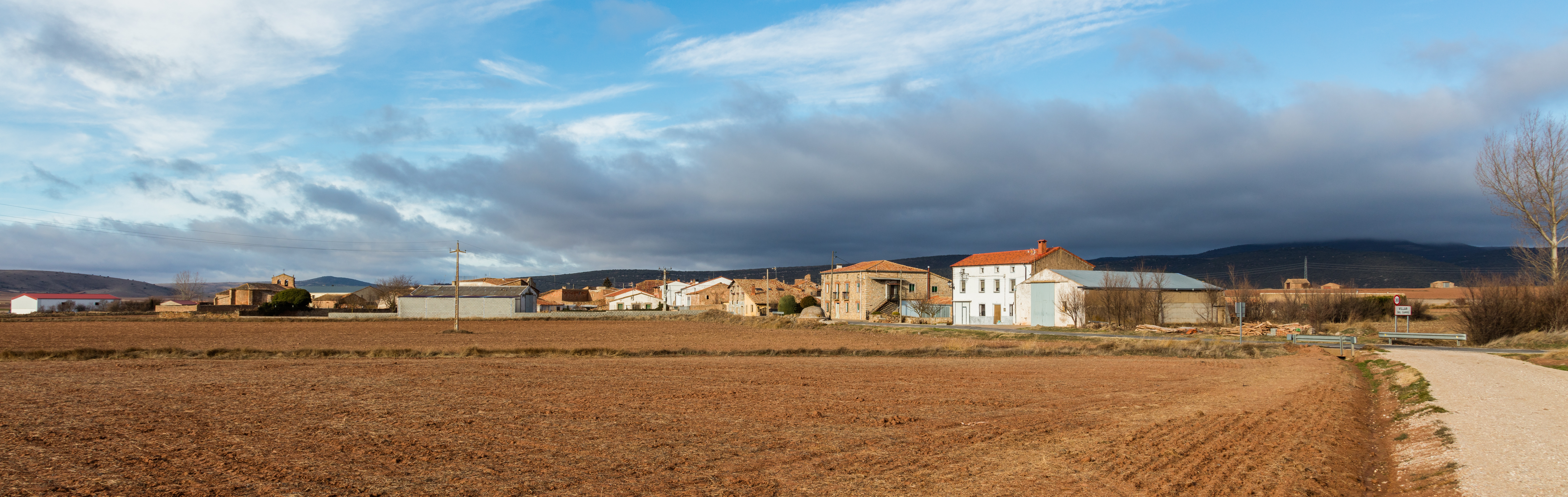

- Location in Spain. Villar del Campo (Spain)
- Coordinates: 41°47′13″N 2°08′54″W
- Country: Spain
- Autonomous community: Castile and León
- Province: Soria
- Municipality: Villar del Campo

Area
  - Total: 25 km^{2} (9.7 sq mi)

Population (2025-01-01)
  - Total: 29
  - Density: 1.2/km^{2} (3.0/sq mi)
- Time zone: UTC+1 (CET)
  - Summer (DST): UTC+2 (CEST)
- Website: Official website

Villar del Campo is a municipality located in the province of Soria, Castile and León, Spain. According to the 2004 census (INE), the municipality had a population of 35 inhabitants.
