= Aranda de Duero =

- Municipality
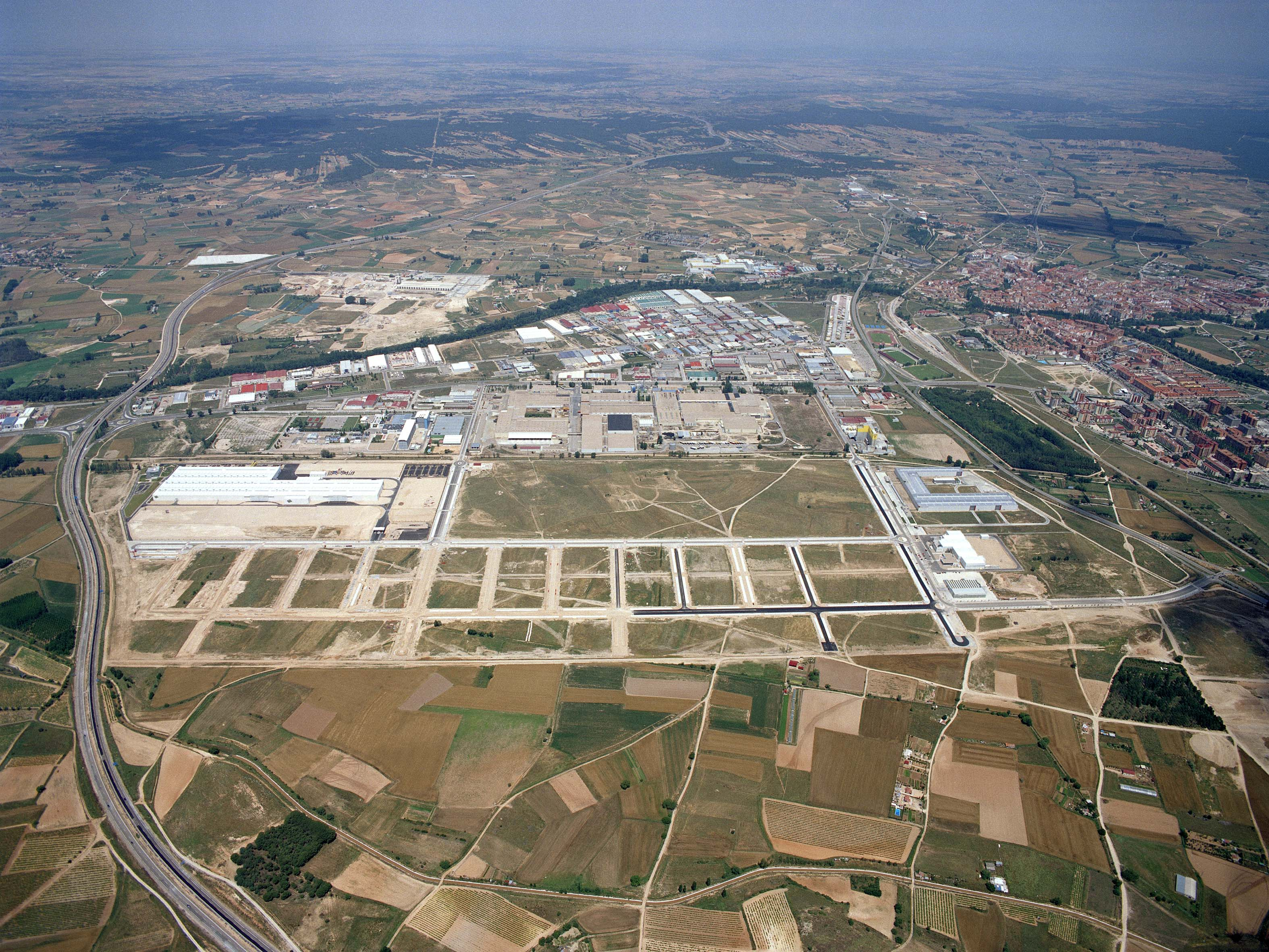
- Aerial view

- Flag Coat of arms
- Interactive map of Aranda de Duero
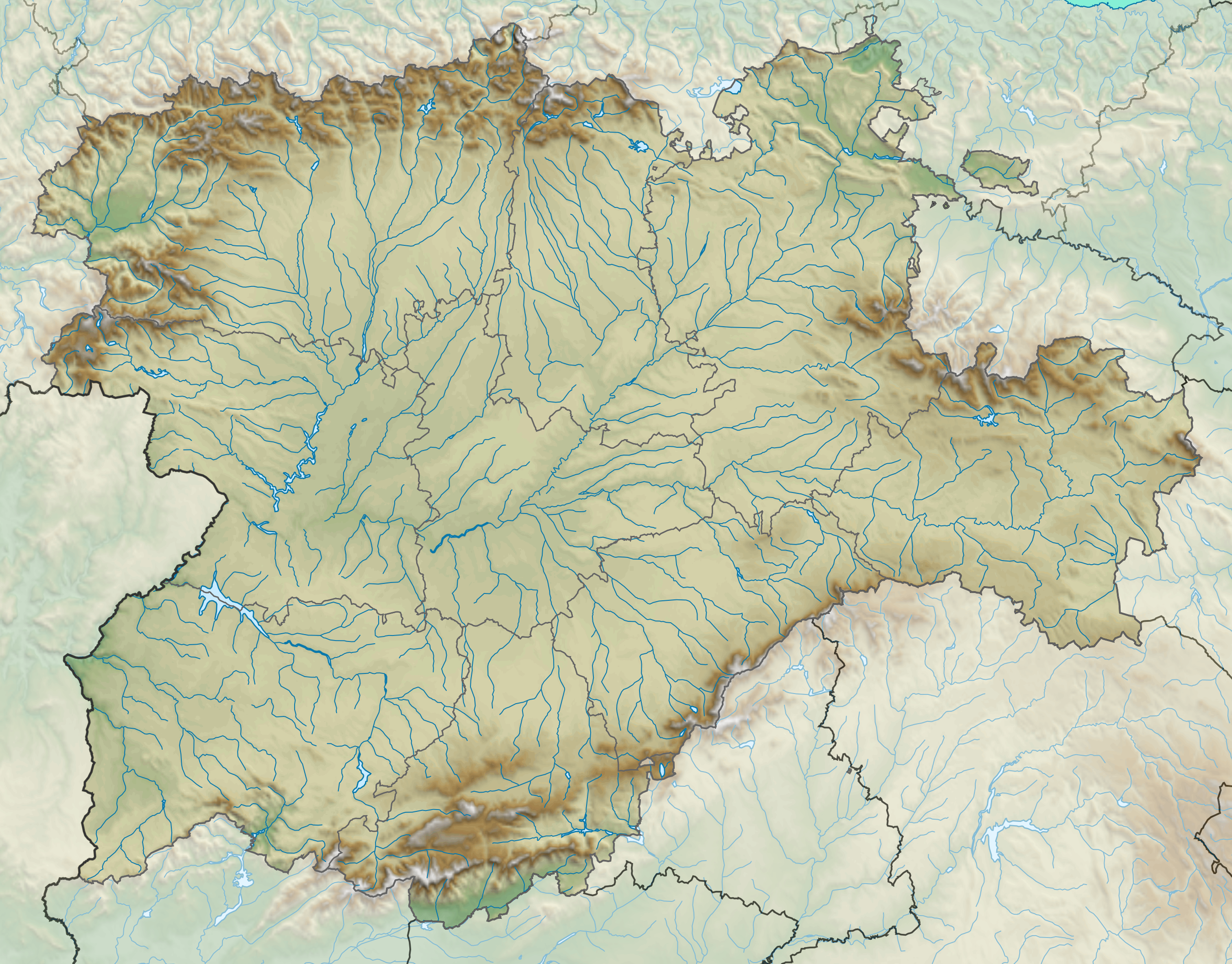
- Location within Castile and León Location within Spain
- Coordinates: 41°41′N 3°41′W
- Country: Spain
- Autonomous community: Castile and León
- Province: Burgos

Government
  - Mayor: Antonio Linaje Niño (Sentir Aranda)

Area
  - Total: 127.28 km^{2} (49.14 sq mi)
  - Land: 126 km^{2} (49 sq mi)
- Elevation: 798 m (2,618 ft)

Population (2025-01-01)
  - Total: 33,956
- Demonyms: Arandino, arandina
- Time zone: UTC+1 (CET)
  - Summer (DST): UTC+2 (CEST)
- Postal code: 09400
- Website: arandadeduero.es

Aranda de Duero is a city and municipality of the province of Burgos, in Castile and León, Spain. The municipality has a population of roughly 33,000. The city lies at the confluence of the Douro and Arandilla rivers, in the south of the province, at the crossroads of the A-1 and A-11 roads. Aranda is the capital of the Ribera del Duero wine region and the third largest industrial centre in Castile and León.

== Description ==
The municipality of Aranda de Duero is made up of three towns: Aranda de Duero (seat or capital), La Aguilera and Sinovas.

Aranda de Duero is the capital of the Ribera del Duero wine region. The town is unique for having wine cellars that interconnect below the streets of the town centre. Wine clubs (peñas) celebrate special events in these cellars.

== Location ==
Aranda de Duero is at the junction of several transport routes across Spain. The N1 autovía (known as A-1) runs north / south by Aranda, along which visitors and import/export goods travel between Madrid and the south coast. Another important road running east to west connects Portugal with important cities on the way (e.g. Zamora, Valladolid, Soria) and the east coast. Its location at the juncture of these routes has led to Aranda de Duero acquiring a growing recognition and function as a business centre. Several multinational corporations, such as Michelin and GlaxoSmithKline have large facilities in the area.

== Climate ==
Aranda de Duero has a warm-summer Mediterranean climate (Köppen Csb) with cold winters.

Climate data for Aranda de Duero, 1981–2010
Month	Jan	Feb	Mar	Apr	May	Jun	Jul	Aug	Sep	Oct	Nov	Dec	Year
Mean daily maximum °C (°F)	8.5 (47.3)	10.9 (51.6)	14.6 (58.3)	16.1 (61.0)	20.3 (68.5)	26.1 (79.0)	30.0 (86.0)	29.4 (84.9)	25.0 (77.0)	18.8 (65.8)	12.6 (54.7)	9.1 (48.4)	18.5 (65.2)
Mean daily minimum °C (°F)	−1.5 (29.3)	−1.4 (29.5)	0.5 (32.9)	2.6 (36.7)	6.0 (42.8)	9.5 (49.1)	11.4 (52.5)	11.1 (52.0)	8.3 (46.9)	5.2 (41.4)	1.5 (34.7)	−0.6 (30.9)	4.4 (39.9)
Average rainfall mm (inches)	29.9 (1.18)	24.1 (0.95)	22.0 (0.87)	43.7 (1.72)	50.2 (1.98)	33.6 (1.32)	14.8 (0.58)	12.4 (0.49)	25.0 (0.98)	48.3 (1.90)	39.3 (1.55)	40.6 (1.60)	383.9 (15.12)
Source: World Meteorological Organization

== History ==
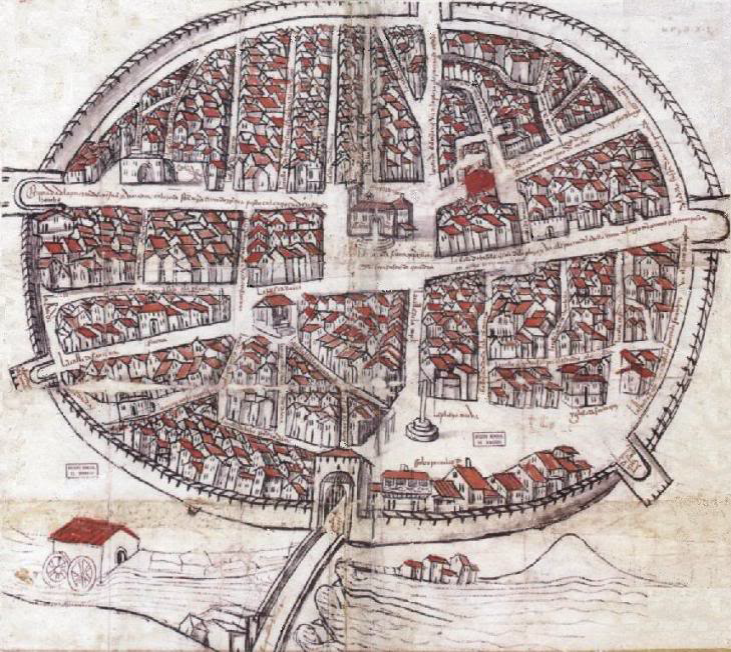
1503 map of the town

Aranda developed in the middle ages on a small hill in between the course of the Arandilla, the Bañuelos creek and the Douro. Its origins are moot, and a settlement predating the 10th century cannot be substantiated.

In the late 13th and early 14th centuries, Aranda grew because of the increasing commercial activity of the town, that became the seat of a weekly market and a fair.

The Council of Aranda, an ecclesiastical synod, was held at Aranda de Duero in 1473 by Alfonso Carillo, Archbishop of Toledo, to overcome the ignorance and evil lives of ecclesiastics. (Note: Among the twenty-nine canons of the council is one which says that orders shall not be conferred on those who are ignorant of Latin. Several canons deal with clerical concubinage, simony, clandestine marriages, etc.)

The town had at least two synagogues prior to the expulsion of the Jews in 1492. (Note: One was purchased by the local official Iñigo de Barahona, but the sale led to disputes involving the council and ecclesiastical authorities, prompting investigations ordered by the Crown of Castile in 1493. The fate of the second synagogue is uncertain, though it may have been transferred to the local church.)

== Culture ==
The roast suckling lamb known as Lechazo is a local speciality. It is usually served with a basic salad and much "torta" bread for dipping in the meat juices.

=== Festivals and events ===
The Fiestas to honour la Virgen de las Viñas (Our Lady of the Vines) take place on the first Sunday after 8 September. They last for nine days from the eve of that Sunday (the Big Day) until the following Sunday when the Fiestas end with the traditional fireworks at midnight, followed by "the sardine burial".

The annual Sonorama music festival is held in the city in mid-August.

=== Architecture ===
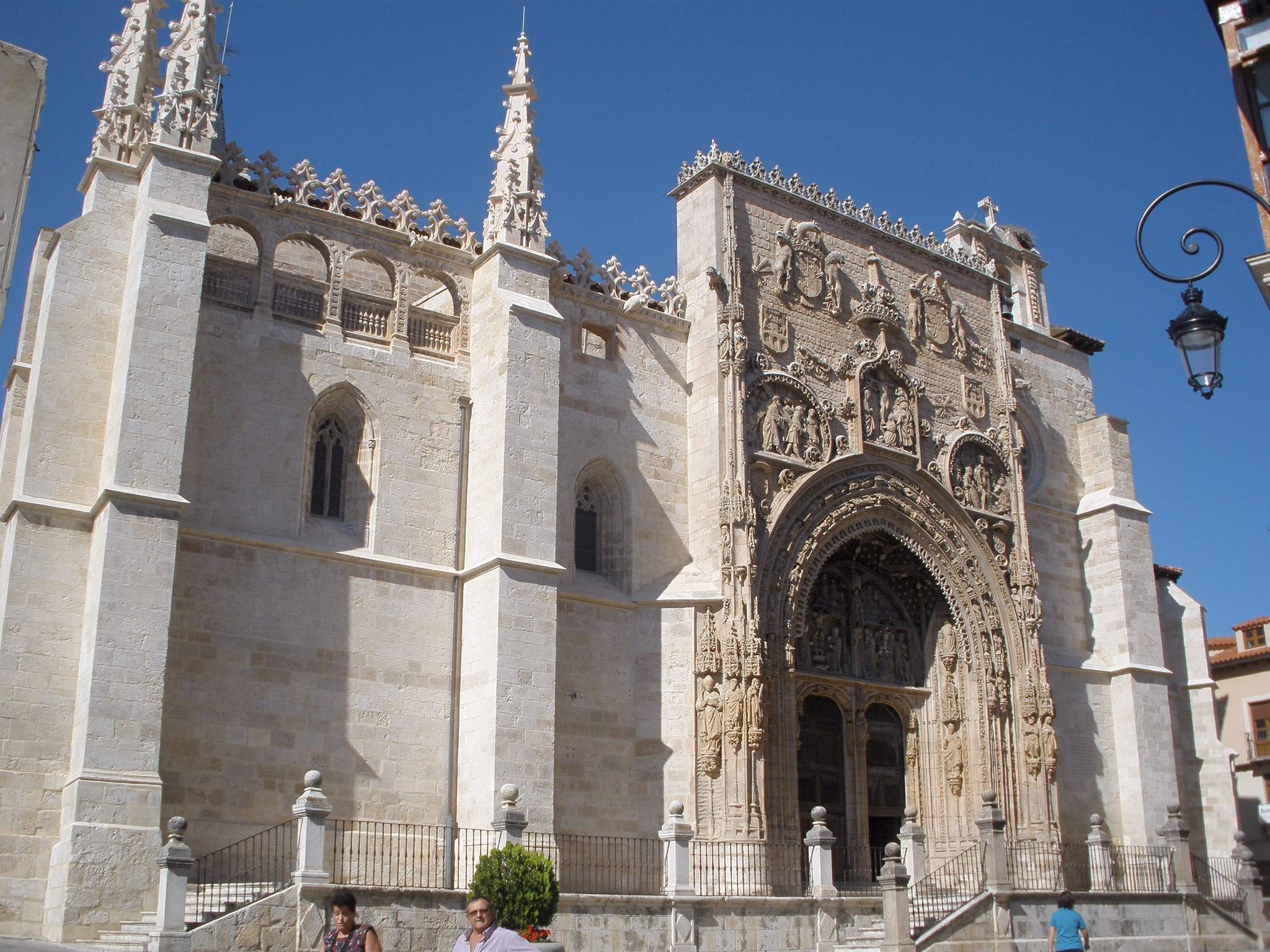
"Santa María la Real" church

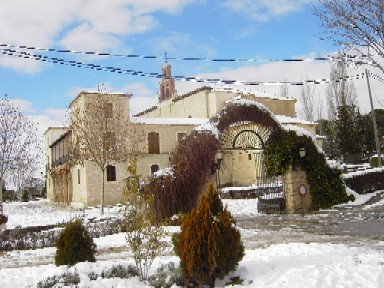
Hermitage of Our Lady of the Vines (Virgen de las Viñas).

Santa María la Real is a church built by Simon de Colonia during the 15th and 16th centuries. Its most notable feature is the main doorway. Above the doorway, three carved stone reliefs show Christ carrying the Cross, The Crucifixion and The Resurrection. The doorway is topped by the coat of arms of King Ferdinand II of Aragon and Queen Isabella I of Castile. Aranda's own coats of arms is also present along with scenes from the Nativity and other Christian celebrations. Due to their deterioration, the church doors have been replaced by exact copies, the original ones are kept in the Museo Sacro.

San Juan, a church, older than Santa Maria and gothic in style, San Juan still has its fortified defensive tower. The Council of Aranda took place in San Juan in 1473. Nowadays San Juan houses the Museo Sacro.

The Virgen de las Viñas Sanctuary is a 17th-century hermitage. It is situated on a small hill to the north of the town. The patron saint of the town is the Virgen de las Viñas, the local legend says that she was found in a vineyard, hence the name.

The Train museum is situated in the old train station "Chelva" and documents the history of Spanish railways.

The Pottery museum houses pottery from all over Spain, with the largest collection from Castile and León.

The Berdugo's palace is a Renaissance mansion.

Bodegas; under the town centre there is a labyrinth of cellars, they were dug between the 12th and 17th centuries. Their original purpose was to store the food and wine that makes the Ribera del Duero famous. Nowadays the Cellars are home to the "Peñas", cultural associations whose main function is to preserve the cellars, organise social events and ensure the whole of the population enjoy the Fiestas.

San Juan de la Vera Cruz Parish Church.

San Nicolas de Bari is a church in the village of Sinovas.

The Conchuela Bridge.

The Romanesque Bridge is situated next to the San Juan Church.

The Humilladero is a stone monument on the route to Las Viñas Sanctuary.

Isilla street is the main pedestrian thoroughfare of the town. Local tradition has it that anyone living in Aranda will walk along this street every day.

== Twin towns – sister cities ==
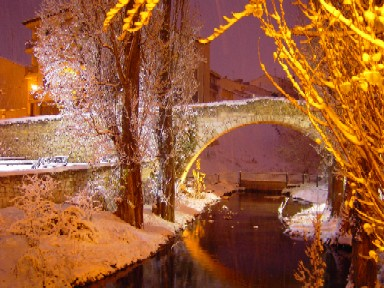
The Romanesque bridge of Aranda de Duero

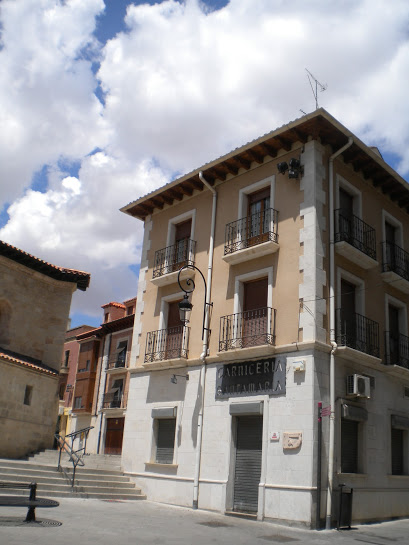
Building in Aranda de Duero

Aranda de Duero is twinned with:

- Langen, Germany
- Miranda do Douro, Portugal
- Romorantin-Lanthenay, France
- Roseburg, United States
- Salon-de-Provence, France
- Santa Cruz de Tenerife, Spain

== Notable people ==
- Juan Carlos Higuero

== Sources and external links ==
- Info & Photos of Aranda in English & Spanish
- Ayuntamiento de Aranda de Duero
- Web of music and the support to the groups of Aranda de Duero
