= European route E82 =

Road in trans-European E-road network

E82

Major junctions
- West end: Porto, Portugal
- East end: Tordesillas, Spain

Location
- Countries: Portugal; Spain

Highway system
- International E-road network; A Class; B Class

European route E 82 is a road part of the International E-road network. It begins in Matosinhos, Portugal and ends in Tordesillas, Spain.

The road follows: Matosinhos - Vila Real - Bragança - Zamora - Tordesillas.

== History ==
In the older E-roads system, used before 1985, the E82 was entirely in Poland (then Polish People's Republic) and ran from Warsaw to Piotrków Trybunalski. During that time, E-roads in Poland did not have a national numbering, therefore it was signed as E82.
