= Morales de Campos =

Coordinates: 41°52′N 5°10′W

Morales de Campos, Spain
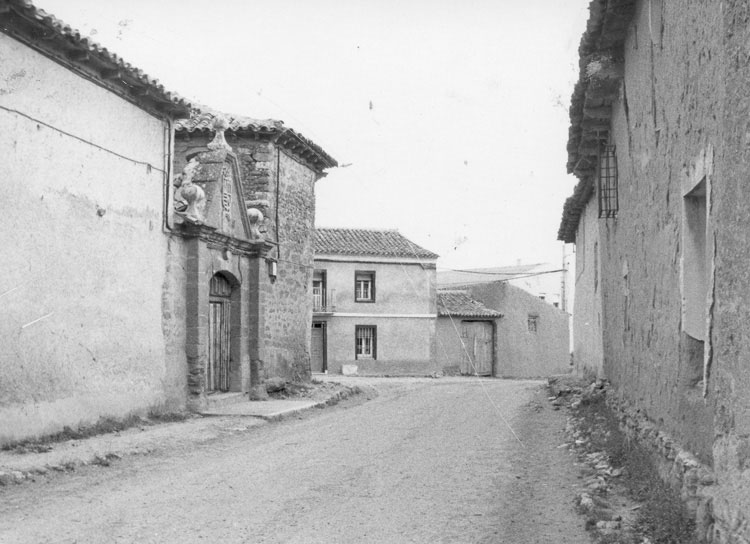
- Country: Spain
- Autonomous community: Castile and León
- Province: Valladolid
- Municipality: Morales de Campos

Area
  - Total: 15 km^{2} (5.8 sq mi)

Population (2025-01-01)
  - Total: 128
  - Density: 8.5/km^{2} (22/sq mi)
- Time zone: UTC+1 (CET)
  - Summer (DST): UTC+2 (CEST)

Morales de Campos is a municipality located in the province of Valladolid, Castile and León, Spain. According to the 2004 census (INE), the municipality has a population of 179 inhabitants.
