= First Street =

First Street or 1st Street may refer to:

== Streets ==
- First Street (Hong Kong)
- 1st Street (Los Angeles)
- Mercer Street (Manhattan), formerly known as First Street

== Other uses ==
- Anyang 1st Street, a commercial hub in South Korea
- First Street, a brand of grocery products sold by Smart & Final
- First Street, an advocacy organization that brings together leading marketing firms to increase public awareness of climate change. https://firststreet.org/

== See also ==
- First Avenue (disambiguation)
- First Street station (disambiguation), train stations of the name
- List of highways numbered 1
