= List of highways numbered 1B =

The following highways are numbered 1B:

== Canada ==
- Alberta Highway 1B (former)
- British Columbia Highway 1B (former)

== India ==
- NH 1B

== New Zealand ==
- New Zealand State Highway 1B

== United States ==
- Delaware Route 1B
- Nebraska Spur 1B
- New Hampshire Route 1B
- New York State Route 1B (former)

== See also ==
- List of highways numbered 1

Preceded by 1A	Lists of highways sharing the same number 1B	Succeeded by 1D
