= List of highways numbered 1D =

The following highways are numbered 1D:

== India ==
- NH 1D

== Mexico ==
- Mexican Federal Highway 1D

== United States ==
- Delaware Route 1D
- Nebraska Spur 1D

== See also ==
- List of highways numbered 1

Preceded by 1B	Lists of highways sharing the same number 1D	Succeeded by 1X
