= B road =

B roads may refer to:

- B roads in Australia, secondary highways
- B roads in Belgium, connecting roads
- B roads in Cyprus, main roads
- B roads in Germany are Bundesstraßen
- B roads in the Isle of Man
- B roads in Jamaica
- B roads in Kenya, major roads
- B roads in Malaysia, roads in the Malaysian state of Selangor
- B roads in Namibia
- Numbered local routes in the United Kingdom:
  - B roads in Great Britain
  - B roads in Northern Ireland
- In the United States:
  - County-designated highways in zone B in Michigan
  - Corridor B, a highway in the U.S. states of North Carolina, Tennessee, Virginia, Kentucky, and Ohio

== See also ==
- List of B1 roads
