= List of A1 roads =

A list of roads designated A1, sorted by alphabetical order of country.

- A01 highway (Afghanistan), a long ring road or beltway connecting Kabul, Kandahar, Herat and Mazar
- A1 motorway (Albania), connecting Durrës and Kukës
- A001 highway (Argentina), a beltway surrounding the city of Buenos Aires
- A1 road (Australia) may refer to several roads part of the highway 1 including the following segments:
  - Bruce Highway, connecting Kybong and Cairns
  - Highway 1 (South Australia), connecting Victoria via Mount Gambier, Adelaide and Port Augusta to Western Australia
  - Princes Highway, connecting New South Wales via Melbourne and Portland to South Australia
  - Highway 1 (New South Wales), consisting of several sections including the Princes Highway and Pacific Highway
- A1 motorway (Austria), connecting Vienna and Salzburg.
- A1 motorway (Belgium), connecting Brussels, Antwerp and Breda
- A1 highway (Bosnia and Herzegovina), carrying Corridor Vc
- A1 highway (Botswana), connecting Gaborone and Francistown
- A1 motorway (Bulgaria), connecting Sofia and Burgas via Plovdiv
- A1 road (Canada) may refer to a class of provincial roads in Manitoba, Canada: see for instance Manitoba Provincial Road 280
- A1 motorway (Croatia), connecting Zagreb and Split and continuing to Dubrovnik
- A1 motorway (Cuba), connecting Havana to Sancti Spíritus, largely under construction
- A1 motorway (Cyprus), connecting Nicosia and Limassol
- A1 road (France) may refer to:
  - A1 motorway (France), connecting Paris and Lille
  - A1 motorway (Martinique), connecting Aimé Césaire International Airport in Le Lamentin and Fort-de-France
- A1 motorway (Germany), connecting Heiligenhafen and Saarbrücken
- A1 motorway (Greece), the principal north–south motorway, connecting Athens with Thessaloniki and the North Macedonian border
- A1 road (Isle of Man), connecting Douglas and Peel
- A1 motorway (Italy), connecting Milan and Naples
- A1 road (Jamaica), connecting Kingston and Lucea
- A1 road (Jersey), connecting St. Helier and St. Aubin
- A1 highway (Kazakhstan), connecting Astana and Petropavl
- A1 road (Kenya), connecting Tanzania and the Sudanese border
- A1 road (Latvia), connecting Riga and Ainaži
- A1 highway (Lithuania), connecting Vilnius and Klaipėda
- A1 motorway (Luxembourg), connecting Luxembourg City and the German A64
- A1 road (Malaysia) may refer to:
  - A1 road (Perak), connecting Chemor and Ipoh
  - A1 road (Sabah), connecting Kota Kinabalu and Kudat
- A-1 motorway (Montenegro), currently connecting Smokovac and Mateševo, it will connect Bar and Boljare at the Serbian border when completed
- A1 motorway (Morocco), connecting Rabat and Tanger
- A1 road (Namibia), connecting Windhoek and Okahandja, and consisting of sections formerly designated B1 upgraded to freeway
- A1 motorway (Netherlands), connecting Amsterdam and Oldenzaal at the German border
- A1 highway (Nigeria), connecting Lagos to Niger in the north
- A1 motorway (North Macedonia), connecting Serbian and Greek borders
- A1 road (People's Republic of China) may refer to:
  - Yingbin Expressway, previously designated A1, now designated S1, in Shanghai
- A1 highway (Poland), connecting north to south Poland
- A1 motorway (Portugal), connecting Lisbon and Porto
- A1 motorway (Romania), connecting Bucharest to Nădlac, at the Nădlac II–Csanádpalota border (Romania–Hungary)
- A1 motorway (Serbia), connecting Horgoš at the Hungarian border and Preševo at the Macedonian border via Belgrade
- A1 motorway (Slovenia), connecting Šentilj at the Austrian border and Koper via Maribor and Ljubljana
- A1 road (Spain) may refer to:
  - A-1 motorway (Spain), connecting Madrid and Irún at the French border
  - A1 motorway (Aragon), connecting Villafranca de Ebro and El Burgo de Ebro
  - A1 motorway (Extremadura), connecting Navalmoral de la Mata and Alcántara at the border with Portugal
- A1 highway (Sri Lanka), connecting Colombo and Kandy
- A1 motorway (Switzerland), connecting St Margrethen and Geneva
- A1 motorway (Tunisia), connecting Tunis and Sfax
- A1 road (United Kingdom) may refer to:
  - A1 road (Great Britain), connecting London and Edinburgh
    - A1(M) motorway, the A1 that is to upgraded motorway standards
    - A1 road in London, the London section of the A1 road
    - A1 in Newcastle upon Tyne, the Newcastle upon Tyne section of the A1 road
  - A1 road (Northern Ireland), connecting Belfast and Newry
- A1 road (United States of America) may refer to:
  - Interstate A-1, connecting the Glenn Highway and the Canada–US border
  - Florida State Road A1A
  - County Route A1 (California), in Lassen County connecting Route 36 near Susanville and Route 139 near Eagle Lake
  - A-1 corridor (Georgia), connecting State Route 400 and Dahlonega
- A1 road (Zimbabwe), connecting Harare and Chirundu

== See also ==
- List of highways numbered 1
