= List of highways numbered 1A =

The following highways are numbered 1A:

== Canada ==
- Alberta Highway 1A
- British Columbia Highway 1A
- Manitoba Highway 1A
- Prince Edward Island Route 1A

== Germany ==
- Bundesstraße 1a, a German road

== Greece ==
- EO1a road, remnants of the realigned Athens–Thessaloniki–Evzonoi road that were not upgraded to the A1 motorway

== India ==
- NH 1A

== Laos ==
- Route 1A (Laos)

== New Zealand ==
- New Zealand State Highway 1A (former)

== Switerland ==
- A1a motorway (Switzerland)

== United States ==
- U.S. Route 1A
- Delaware Route 1A
- Massachusetts Route 1A
- New Hampshire Route 1A
- New York State Route 1A (former)
- Rhode Island Route 1A
- Secondary State Highway 1A (Washington) (former)

== Vietnam ==
- National Route 1 (Vietnam), also known as National Route 1, a road connecting the northernmost and southernmost areas of the country

== See also ==
- Florida State Road A1A
- List of highways numbered 1

Preceded by 1	Lists of highways sharing the same number 1A	Succeeded by 1B
