= Transport in Martinique =

Martinique is a small Caribbean island that is an overseas department/region and single territorial collectivity of France. An integral part of the French Republic, Martinique is located in the Lesser Antilles of the West Indies in the eastern Caribbean Sea. It has a land area of 1,128 km^{2} (436 sq mi) and a population of 376,480 inhabitants as of January 2016. One of the Windward Islands, it is directly north of Saint Lucia, northwest of Barbados and south of Dominica. Martinique is also an Outermost Region (OMR) of the European Union and a special territory of the European Union; the currency in use is the euro. Virtually the entire population speaks both French (the sole official language) and Martinican Creole.

Given its geography, the balance of its transport network is unusual: there are three airports, only 2.5 km of heritage railway, and 2,105 km of paved highways (in 2000). Sea transport is also important, and there are two harbours at Fort-de-France and La Trinité.

== Road transport ==
As of 2000, Martinique had 2,105 km of paved highways.

Part of the N5 road has been upgraded to a motorway, running from the capital Fort-de-France through Lamentin, Ducos and Rivière Salée until Les Coteaux.

The part from Fort-de-France to the Martinique Aimé Césaire International Airport is designated as A1 (972), part of the French autoroute system.

== Rail transport ==
As of 2018, Martininique has only one railway line in operation: the little-known 2.5 km long Le Train des Plantations is a heritage railway that runs from the Rhum Museum in Sainte-Marie through some sugarcane and banana plantations over two Bailey bridges to the Banana Museum.

Several narrow gauge sugarcane railways previously existed. Saint-Pierre had horse-drawn trams, which had an unusually narrow gauge. At least two preserved steam locomotives have been visually refurbished, but are not operational.

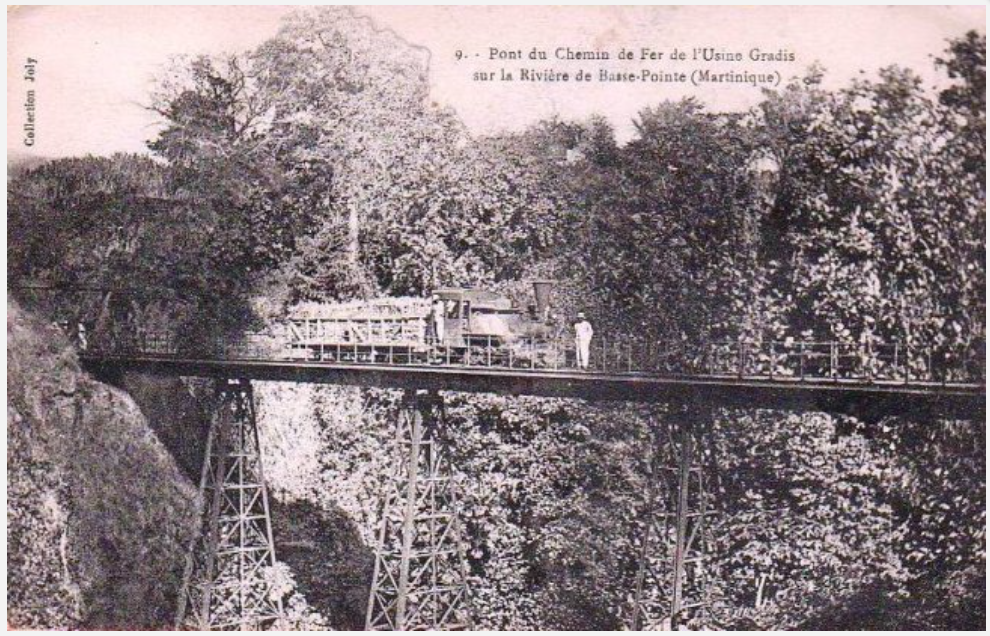
Rail bridge of l'Usine Gradis on the Riviere de Basse-Pointe

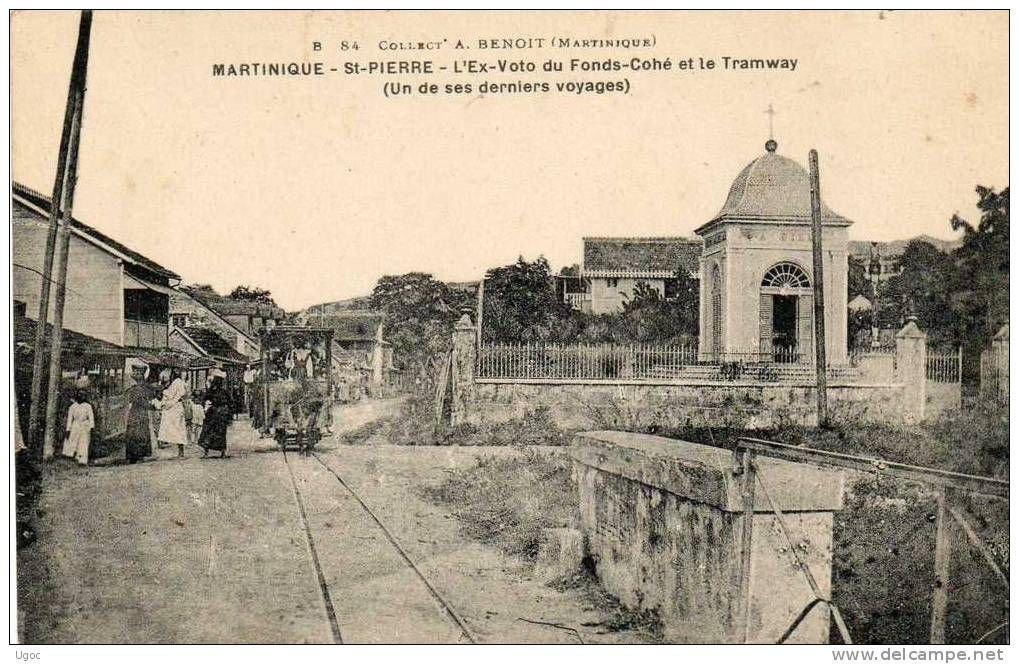
Narrow gauge tram at Saint-Pierre

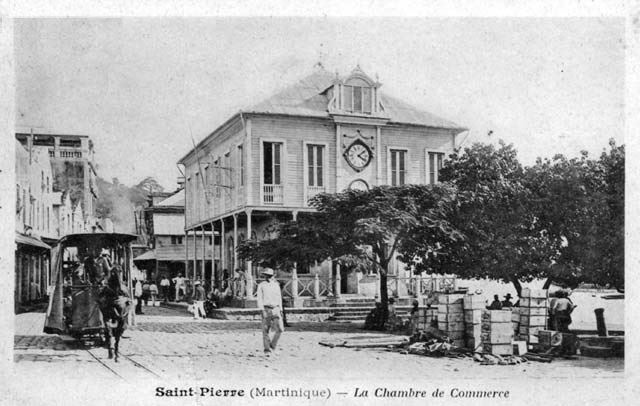
Narrow gauge tram at St Pierre

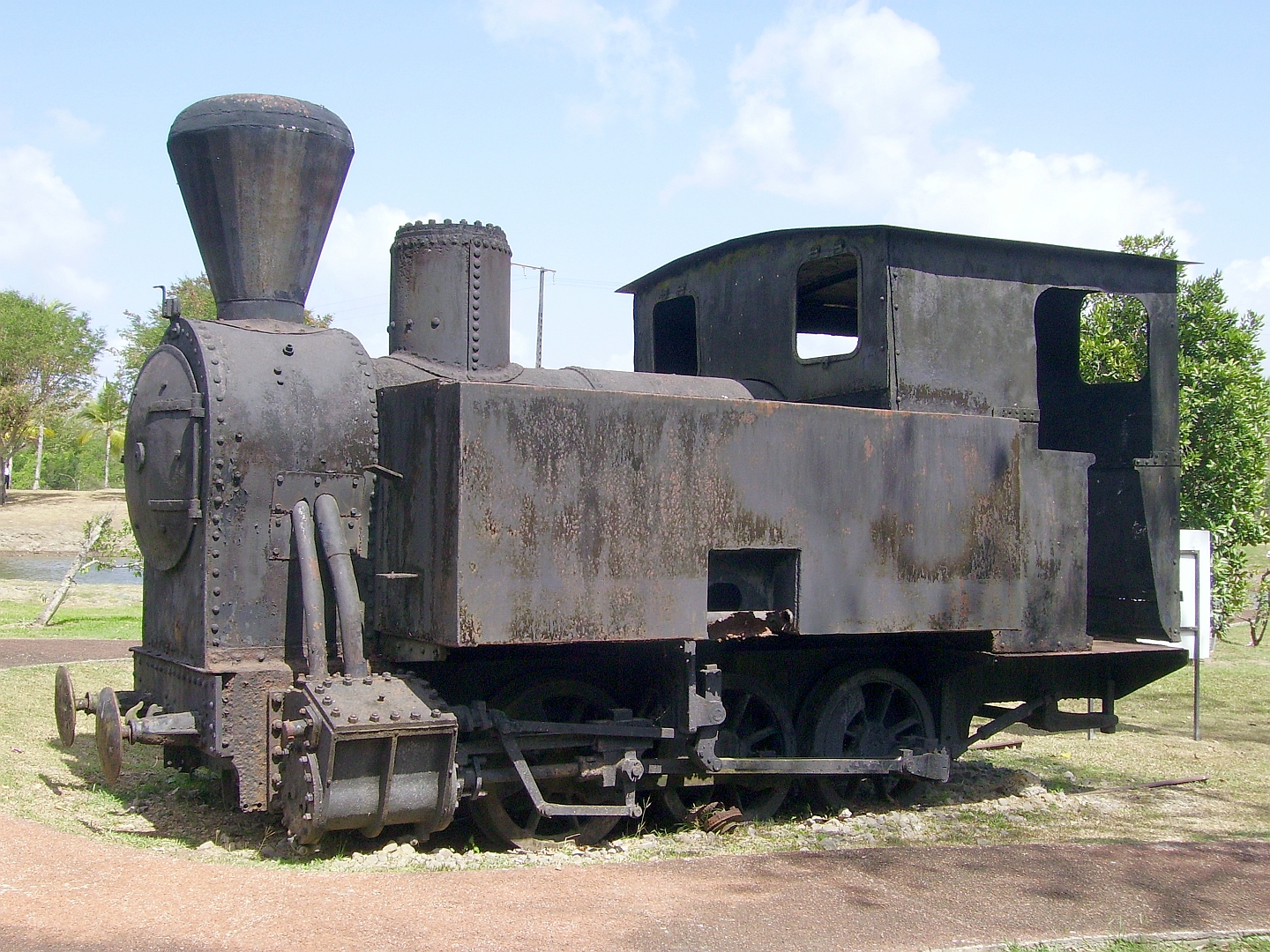
Loco at Maison de la Canne en Martinique

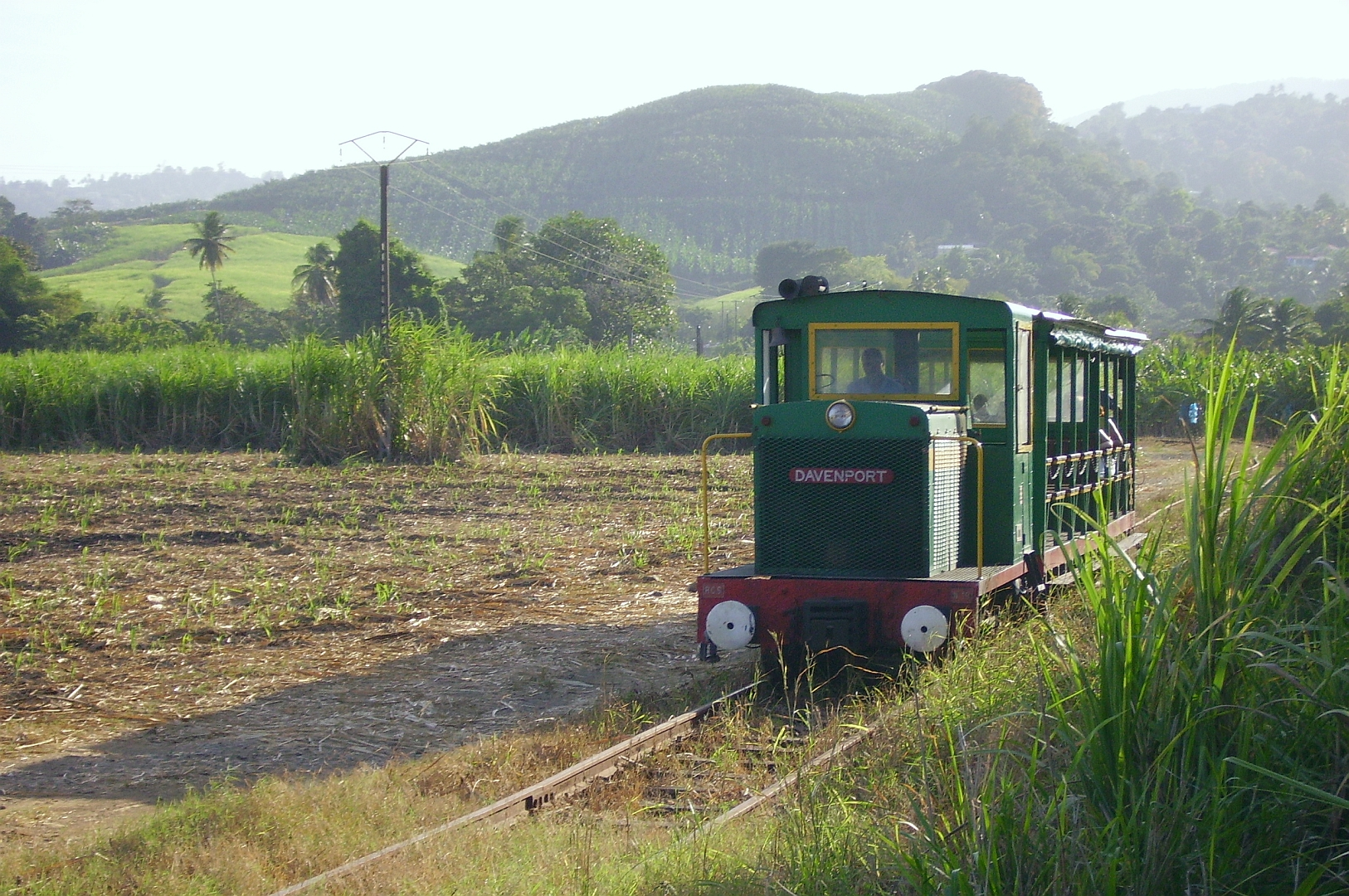
Le Train des Plantations

== Air transport ==
Martinique has three airports. Martinique Aimé Césaire International Airport is the large public runway; Bouillon and EDF are private heliports.
