= List of highways numbered 1X =

The following highways are numbered 1X:

== Canada ==
- Alberta Highway 1X

== United States ==
- New York State Route 1X (former)

== See also ==
- List of highways numbered 1

Preceded by 1D	Lists of highways sharing the same number 1X	Succeeded by 2
