= St. Kitts Scenic Railway =

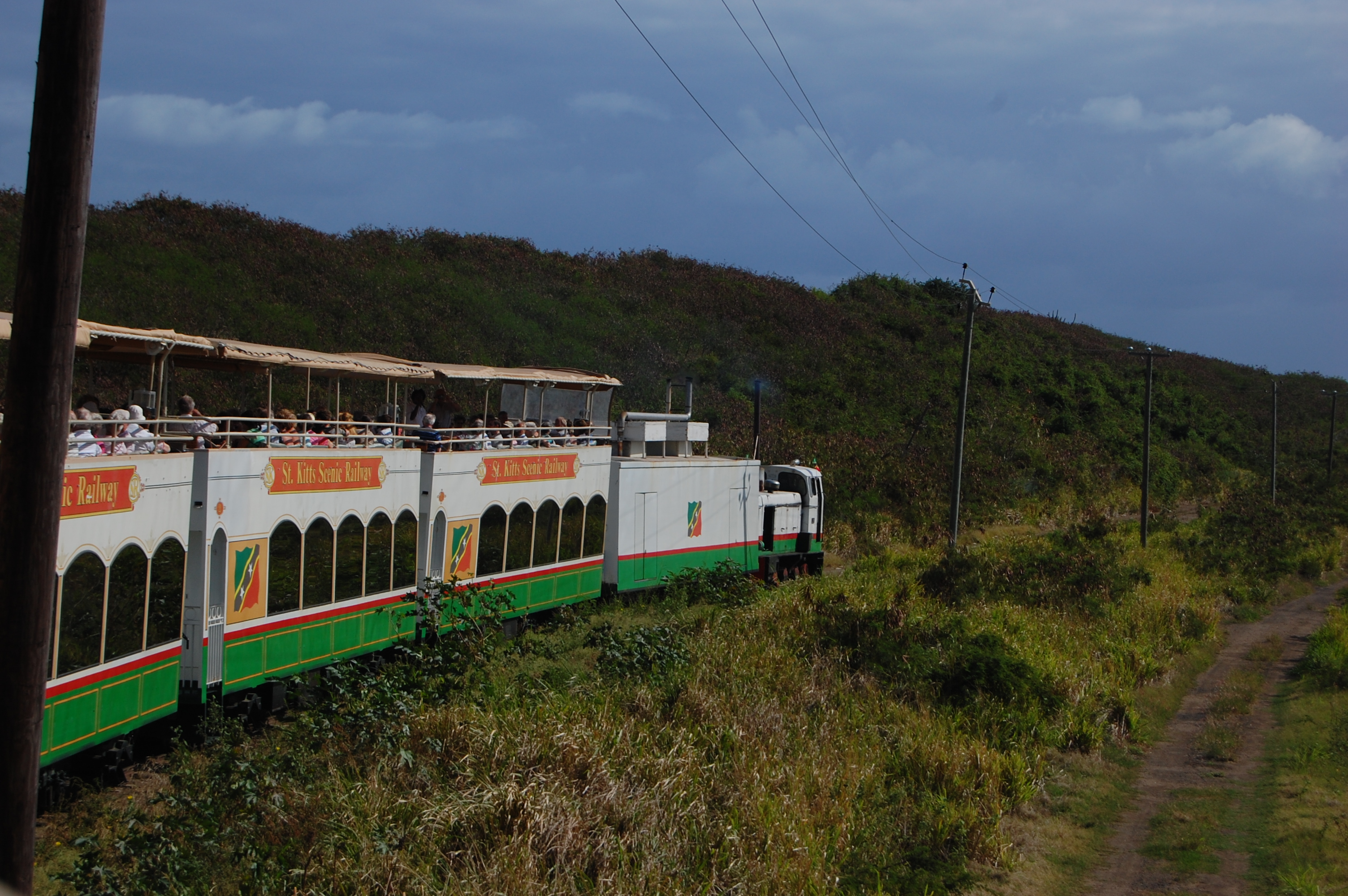
- St. Kitts Scenic Railway

Overview
- Locale: St. Kitts

History
- Opened: 1912

Technical
- Line length: 29 kilometres (18 mi)
- Track gauge: 762 mm (2 ft 6 in)
- Electrification: none

St. Kitts Scenic Railway is a 29-kilometre (18 mi) long narrow-gauge railway line along the coastline of the island of St. Kitts in the eastern Caribbean, with a track gauge of 762 mm (2 ft 6 in).

== History ==
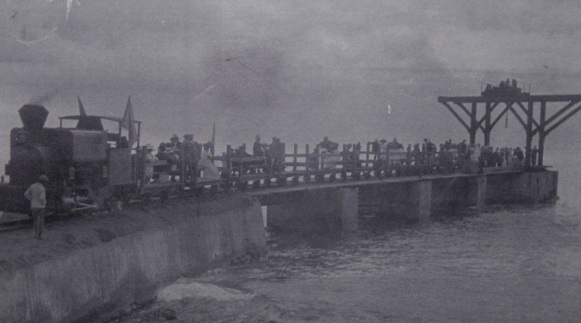
Historic photograph of steam locomotive No. 3 "Queen Mary" with the first passenger train on the new Factory Pier at opening of the sugar factory in 1912

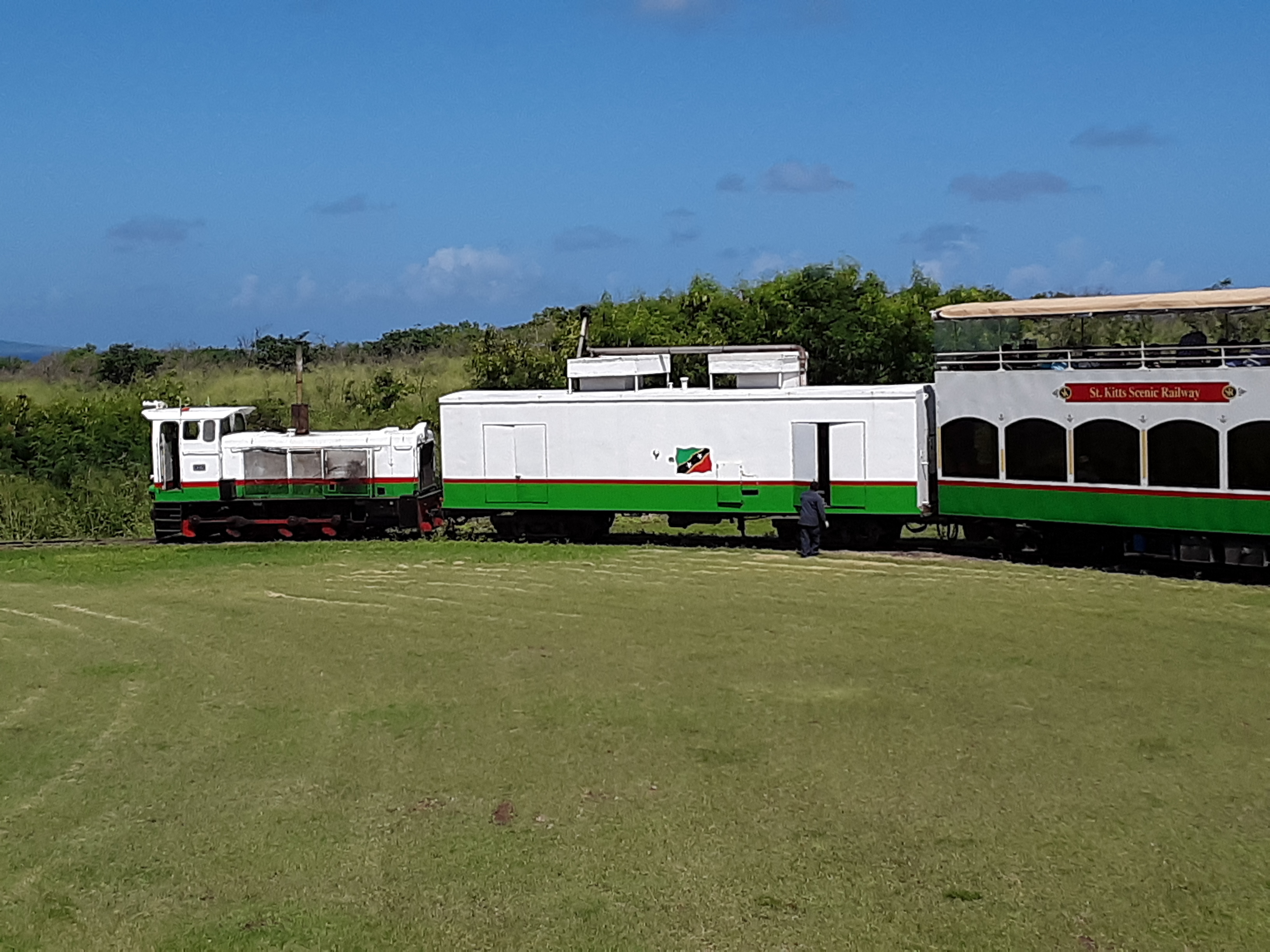
View showing locomotive and power car

The original track was laid from 1912 to 1926, to deliver sugar cane from the plantations to the new centralised sugar mill in Basseterre. The sugar mill was built by a group of investors in 1912, to reduce processing costs and increase profitability by applying the principle of economies of scale, due to a sugar price drop caused by the worldwide introduction of sugar beets. Previously, each plantation had its own sugar mill. The first section of the railway line, from the Factory Pier to the St. Kitts Basseterre Sugar Factory, with a West Line branch running 4 miles (6.4 km) to Palmetto Point at Trinity and a North Line branch running out to Mills's at Bourryeau Estate, was completed on 28 February 1912. It was celebrated with a special train carrying invited dignitaries. The railway was then operated seasonally from February to June for the annual sugar harvest.

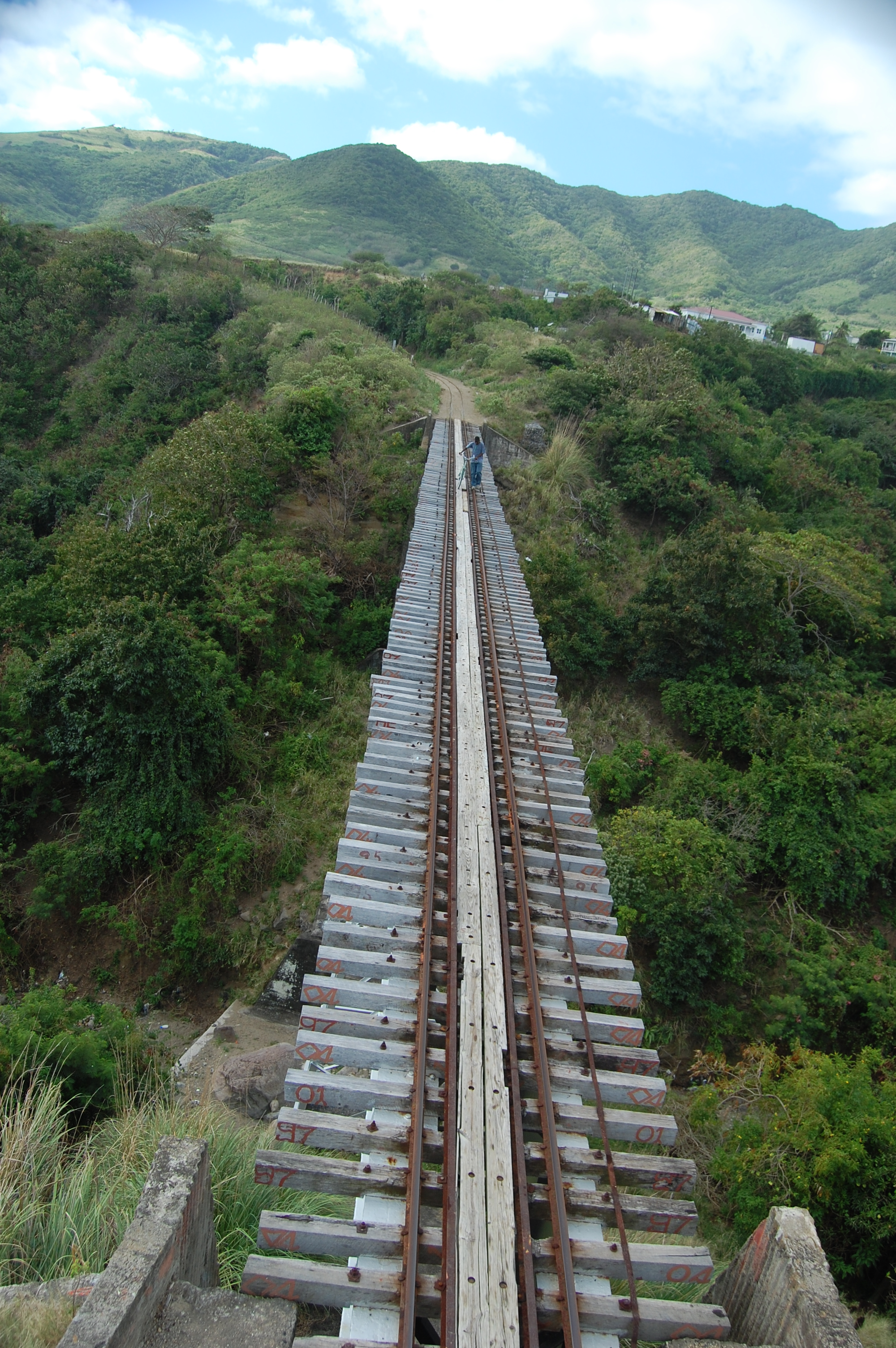
The train crosses several historic bridges

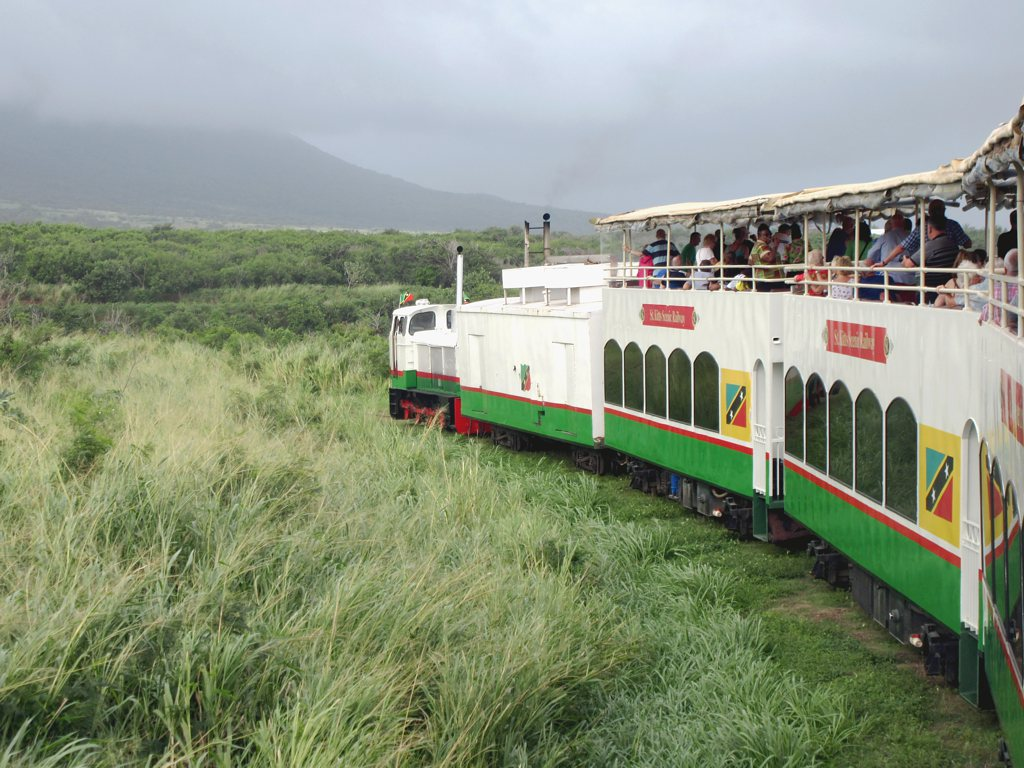
A scenic view from the railway

The privately owned St. Kitts Scenic Railway commenced running tourist trains on 28 January 2003. The scheme is run in an unusual partnership between the government and a private enterprise. The slogan “Last Railway in the West Indies” demonstrates its objective to preserve a link to the past, when sugar ruled the island's economy. The slogan is, however, somewhat misleading, as there are still functional railways elsewhere in the West Indies, in Martinique, Jamaica, the Dominican Republic and, most notably, Cuba. Nowadays, railroad operations are financed by tourism, which is determined by cruise ships.

== Rolling stock ==
=== Locomotives ===
The railway owns and operates three diesel-hydraulic locomotives of the PKP class Lyd2 built by 23 August Works in Romania, bought from Polish sugar refinery in Dobre after a liquidation of its railway.

The classification may be interpreted as follows:

- L indicates a narrow gauge locomotive
- y indicates 3 axles (0-6-0 or C)
- d indicates diesel fuel
- 2 indicates hydraulic transmission.

The locomotives are configured with a single cab, with driving positions for both directions. The overhauled diesel engines are from Henschel.

=== Carriages ===
The 5 double-decked SKSR “Island Series” rail cars were designed by Colorado Railcar, and built in 2002 by Jeff Hamilton of the Hamilton Manufacturing Company in Washington state, USA. Hamilton designed and constructed a new type of double-decker carriage, of which the roof may be lifted hydraulically to provide unobstructed open-air seating at the top deck. These carriages are essentially a miniature full-dome rail car without the vista-dome glass, and with a canvas canopy roof instead.

The lower air-conditioned and carpeted parlour deck has 6 ft (1.8 m) vaulted windows, is furnished with cushioned rattan chairs at inlaid 4-and-2 top tables, and is decorated with paintings by local artists. This level includes a bar and restroom in each car. The open-air upper deck seating area is reached by a spiral stairway, and the upper deck offers 360-degree viewing. However, the passenger seats face inward, which restricts viewing somewhat.

== Gallery ==
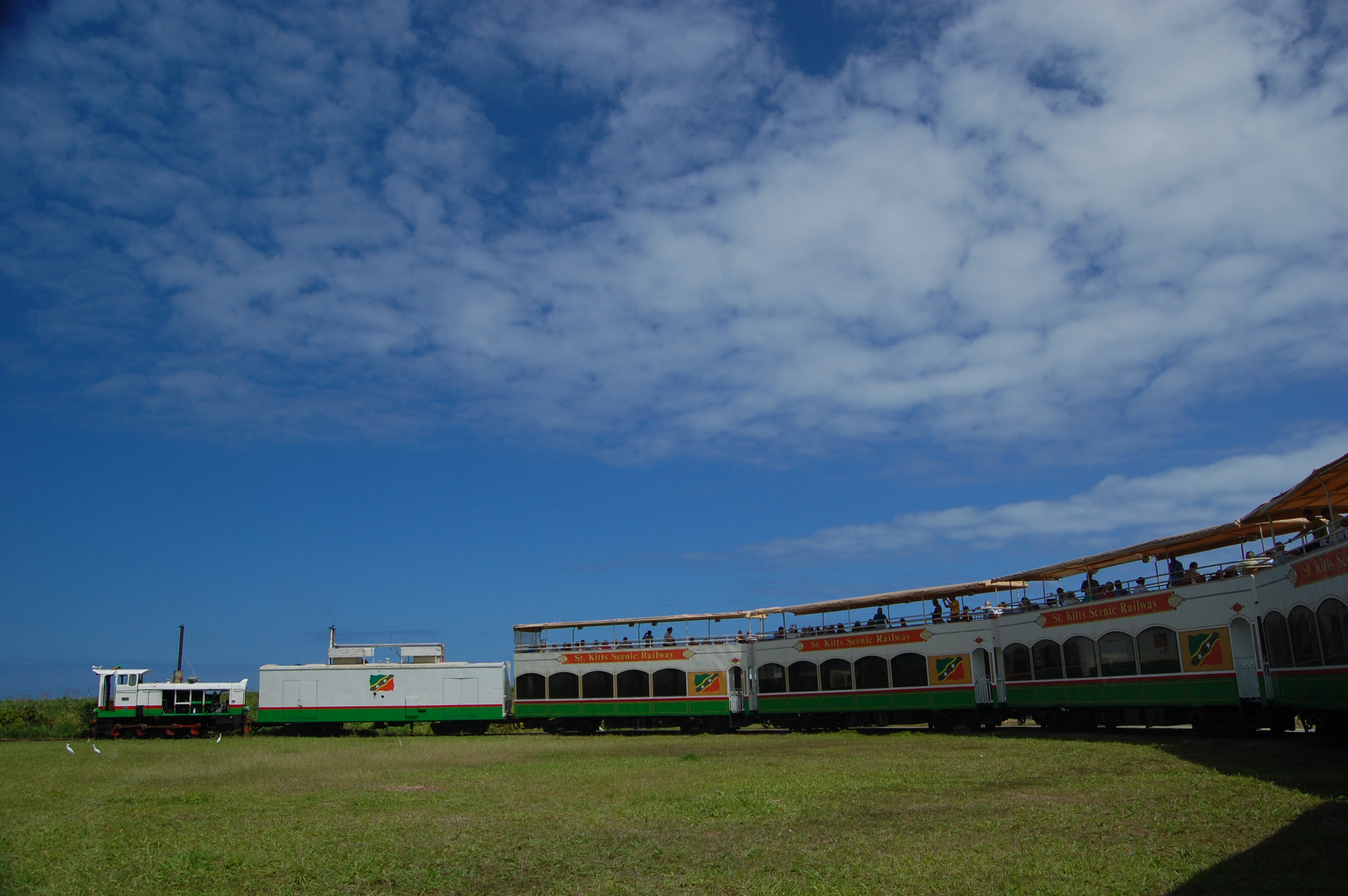

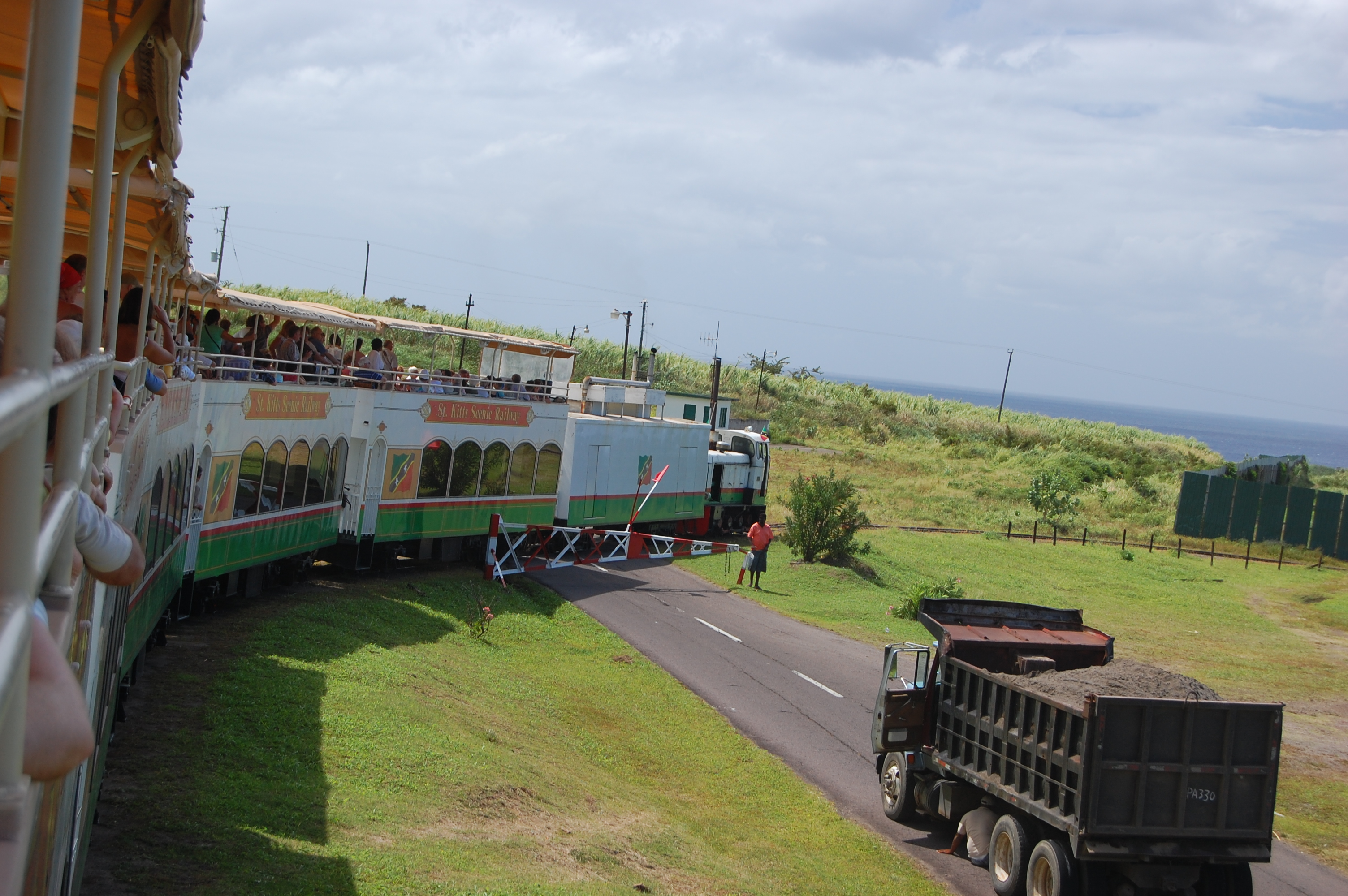

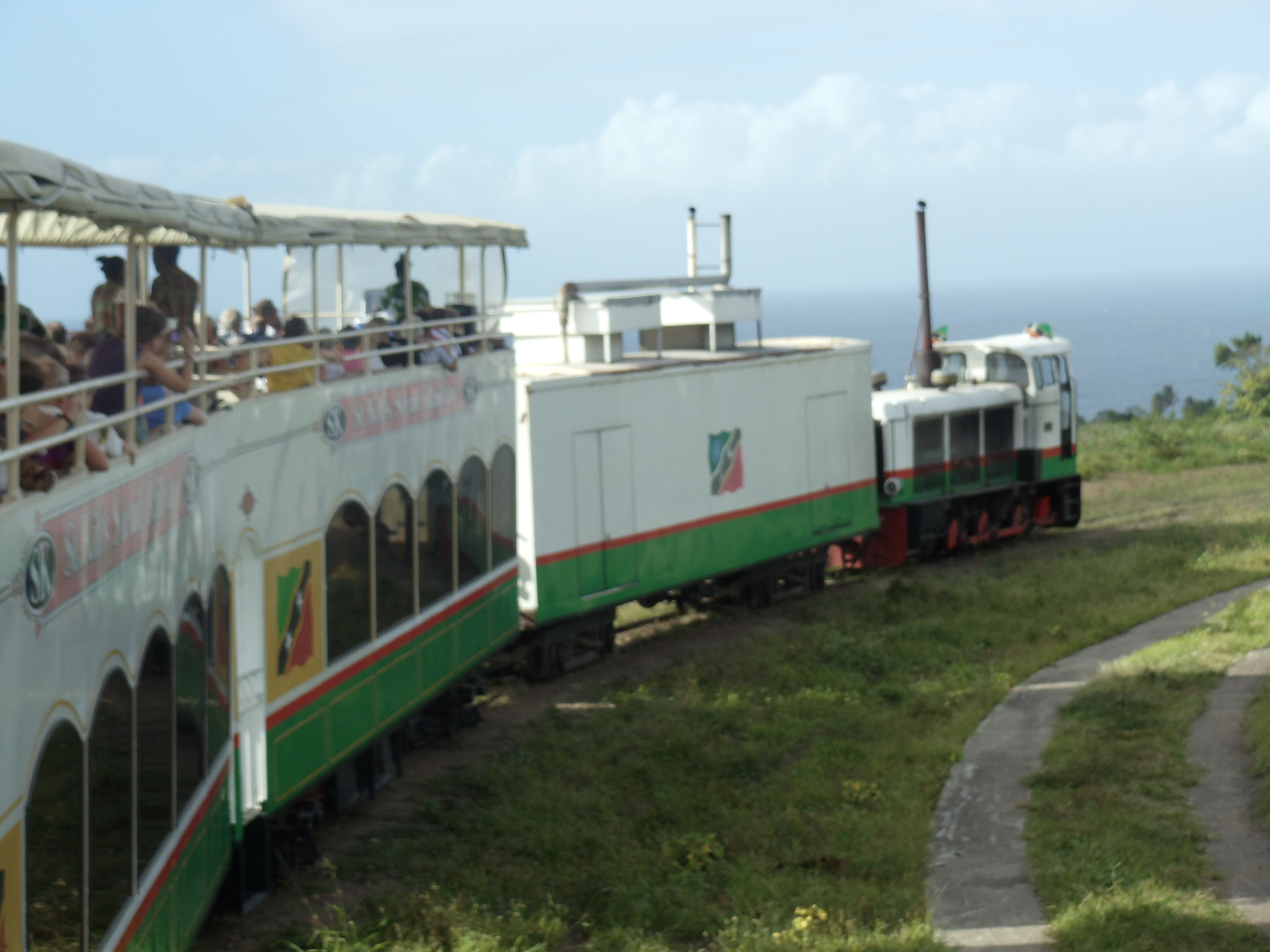

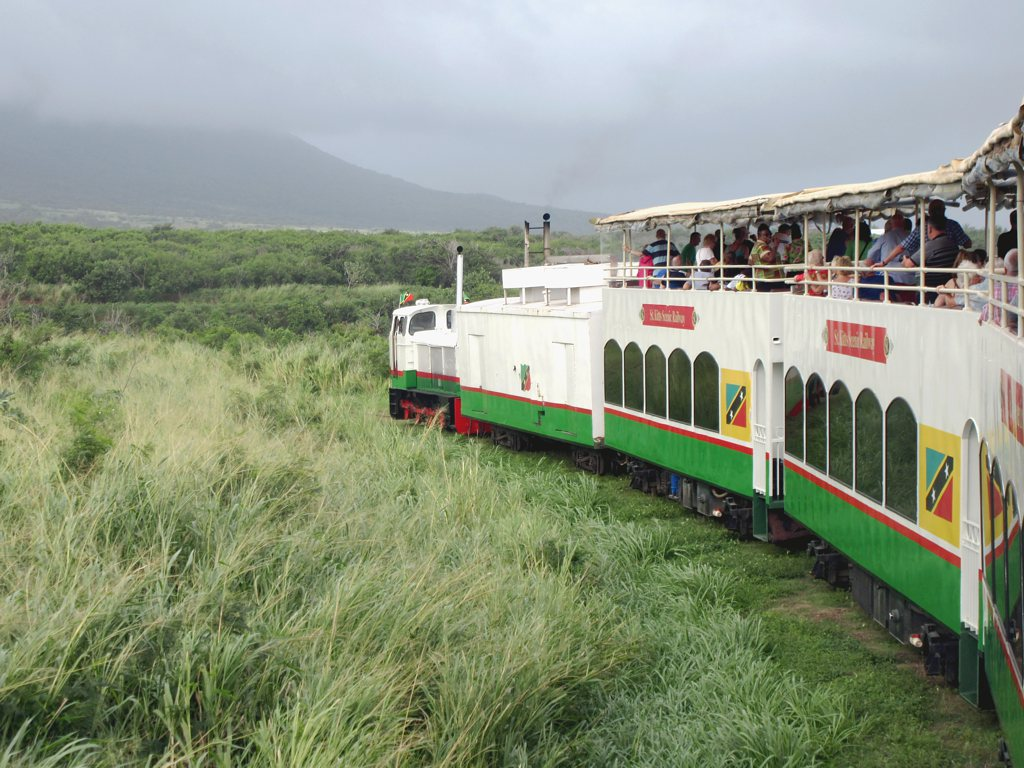

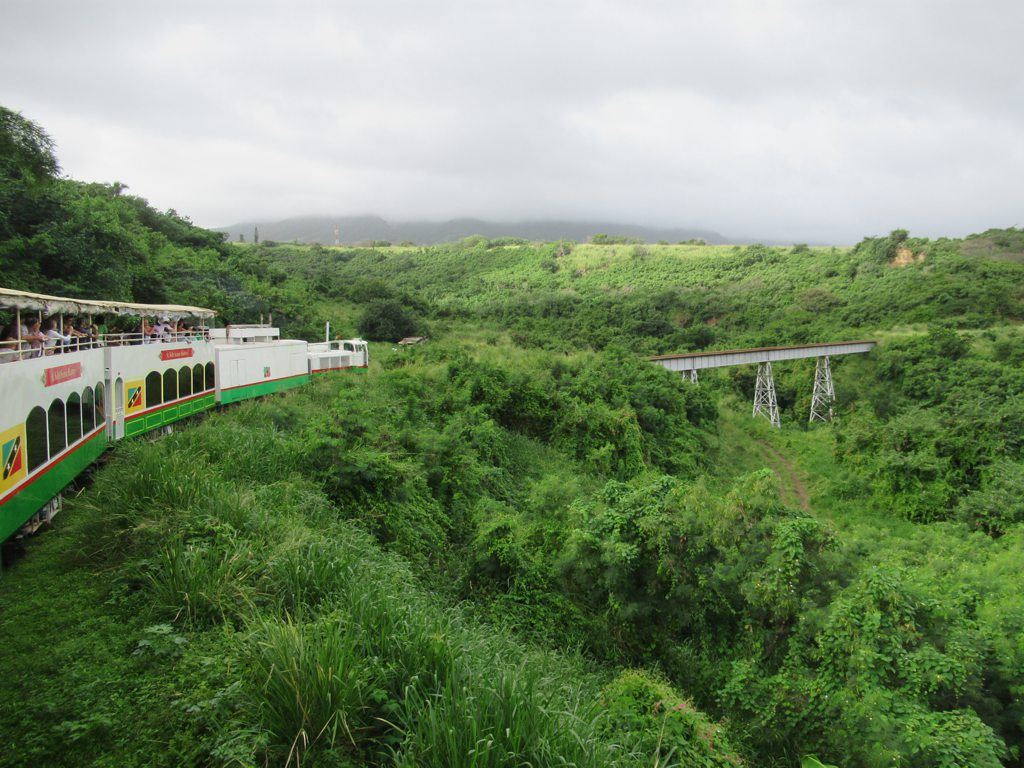

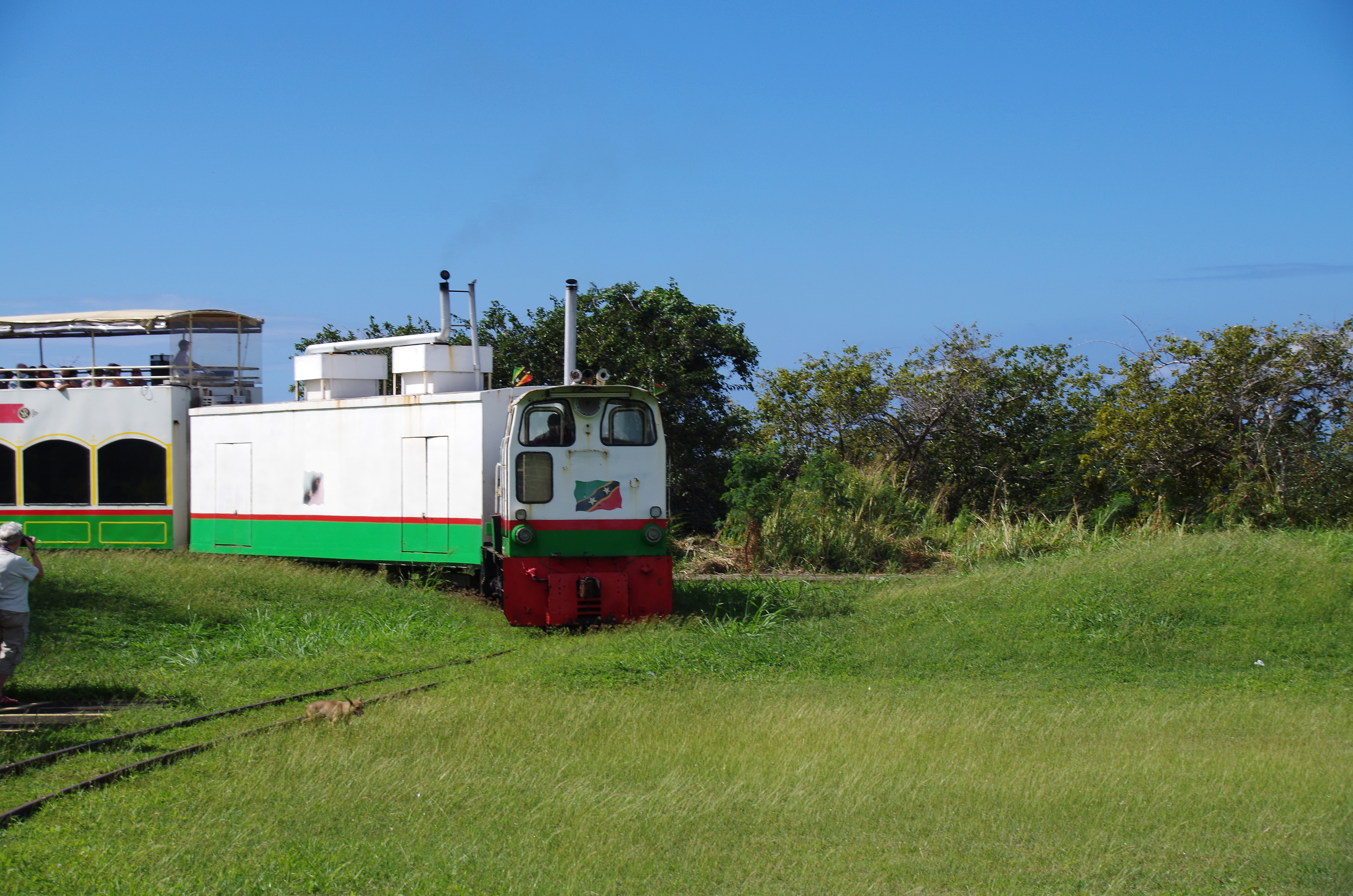

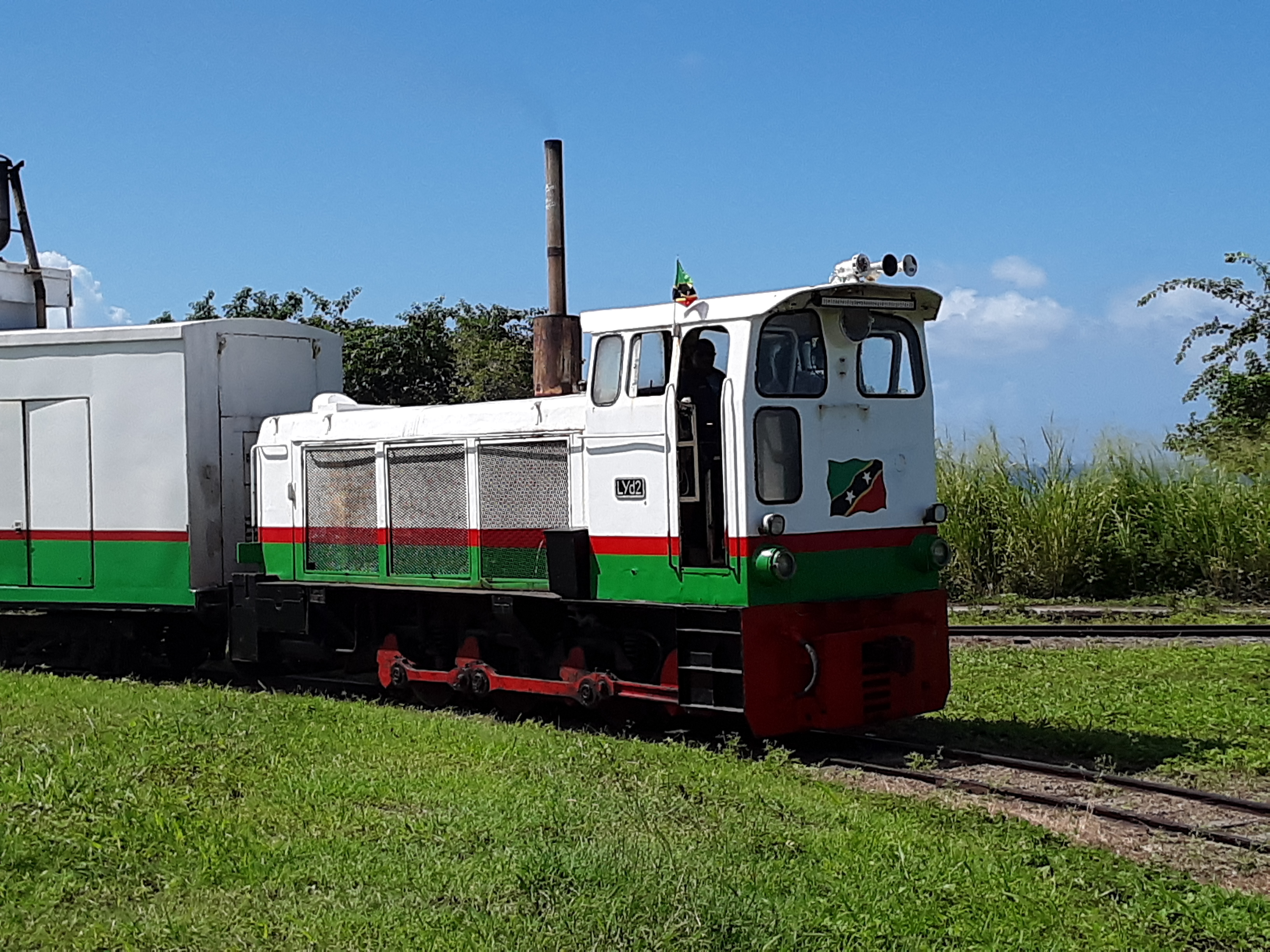

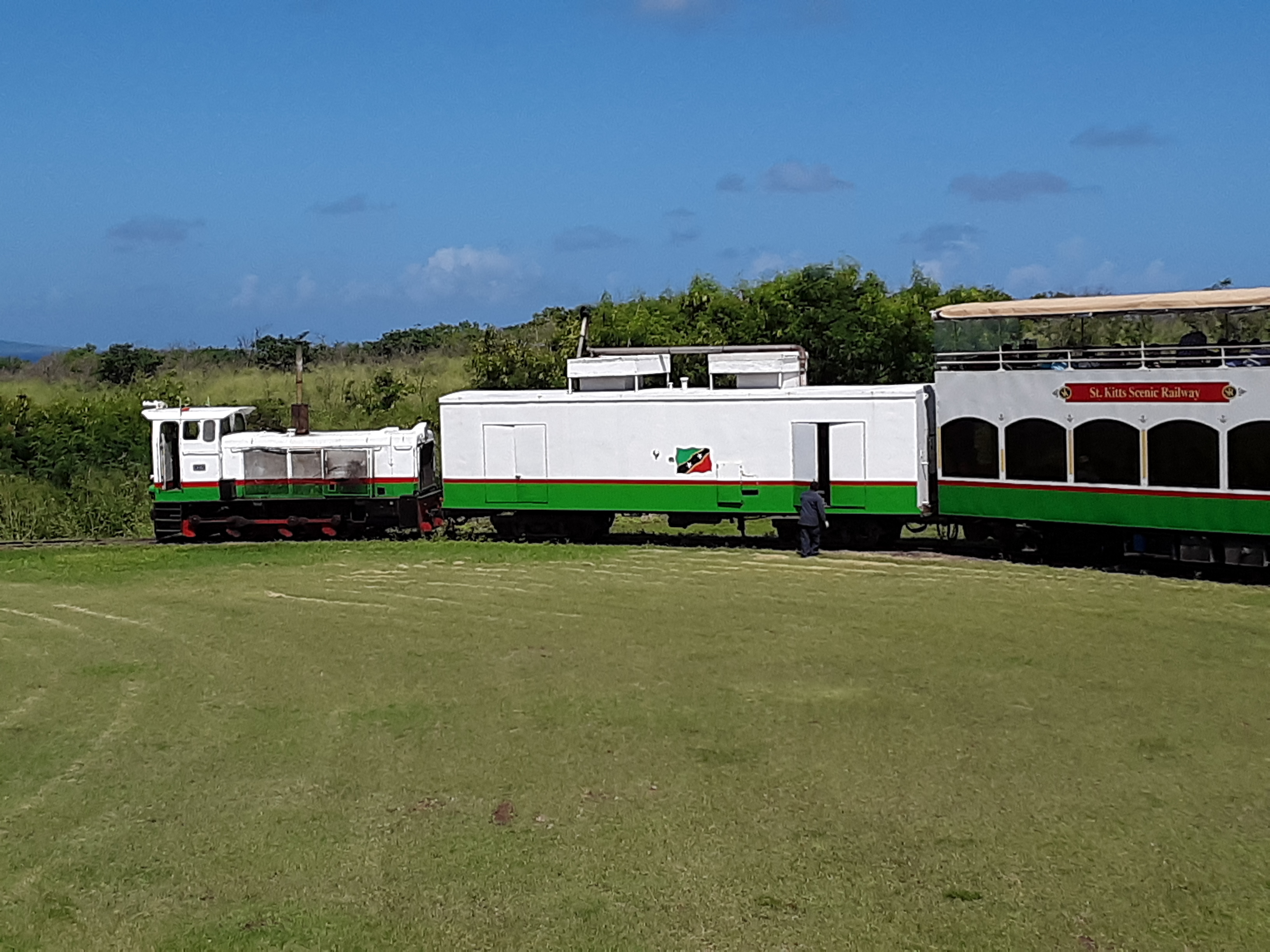

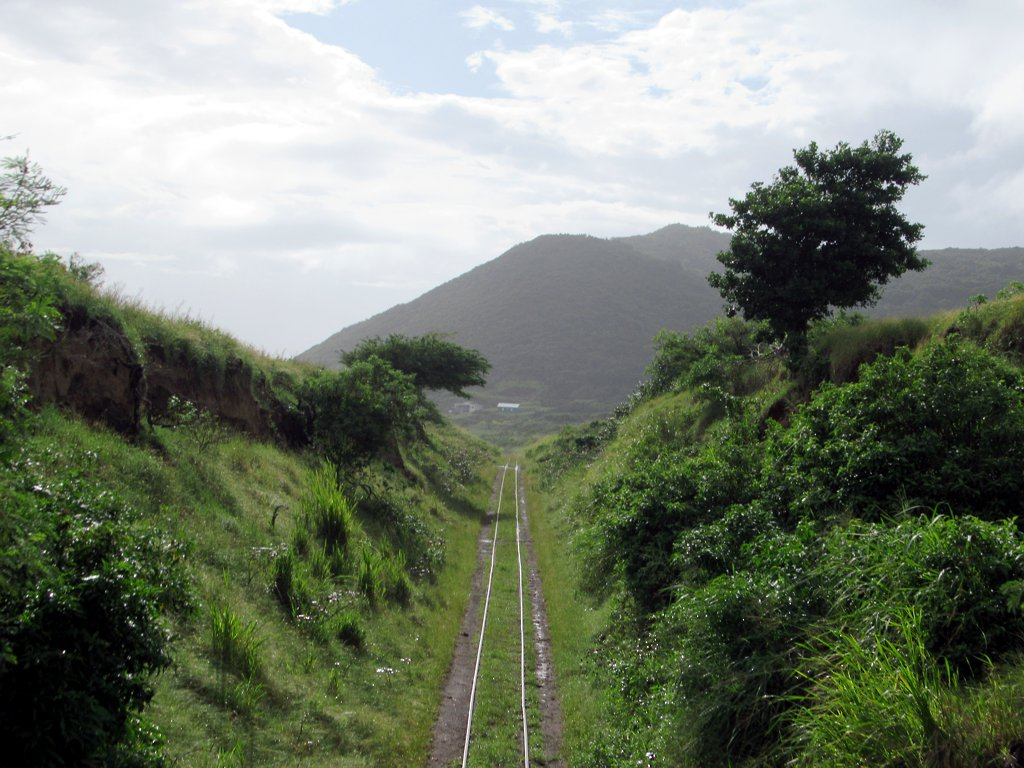

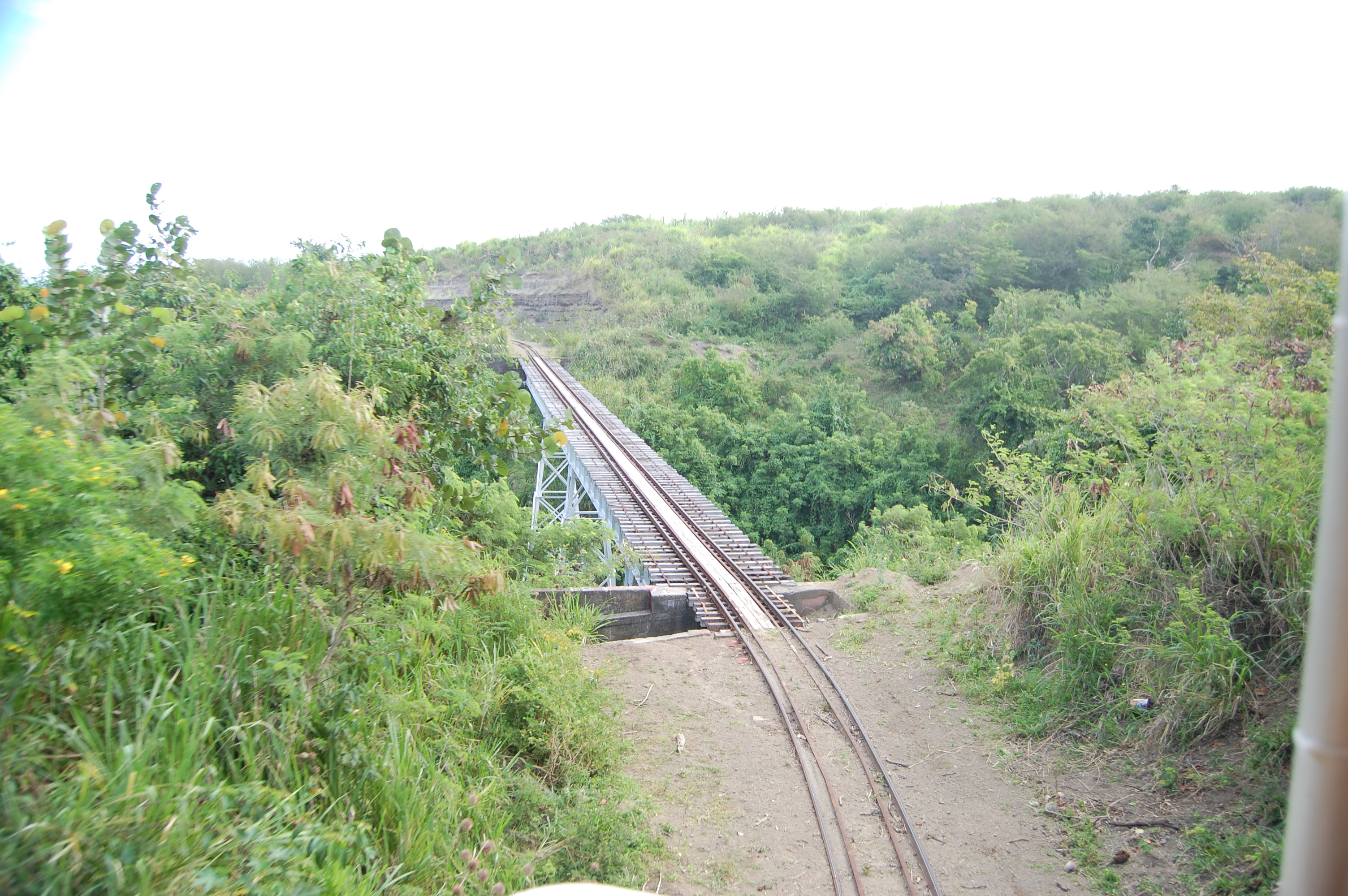

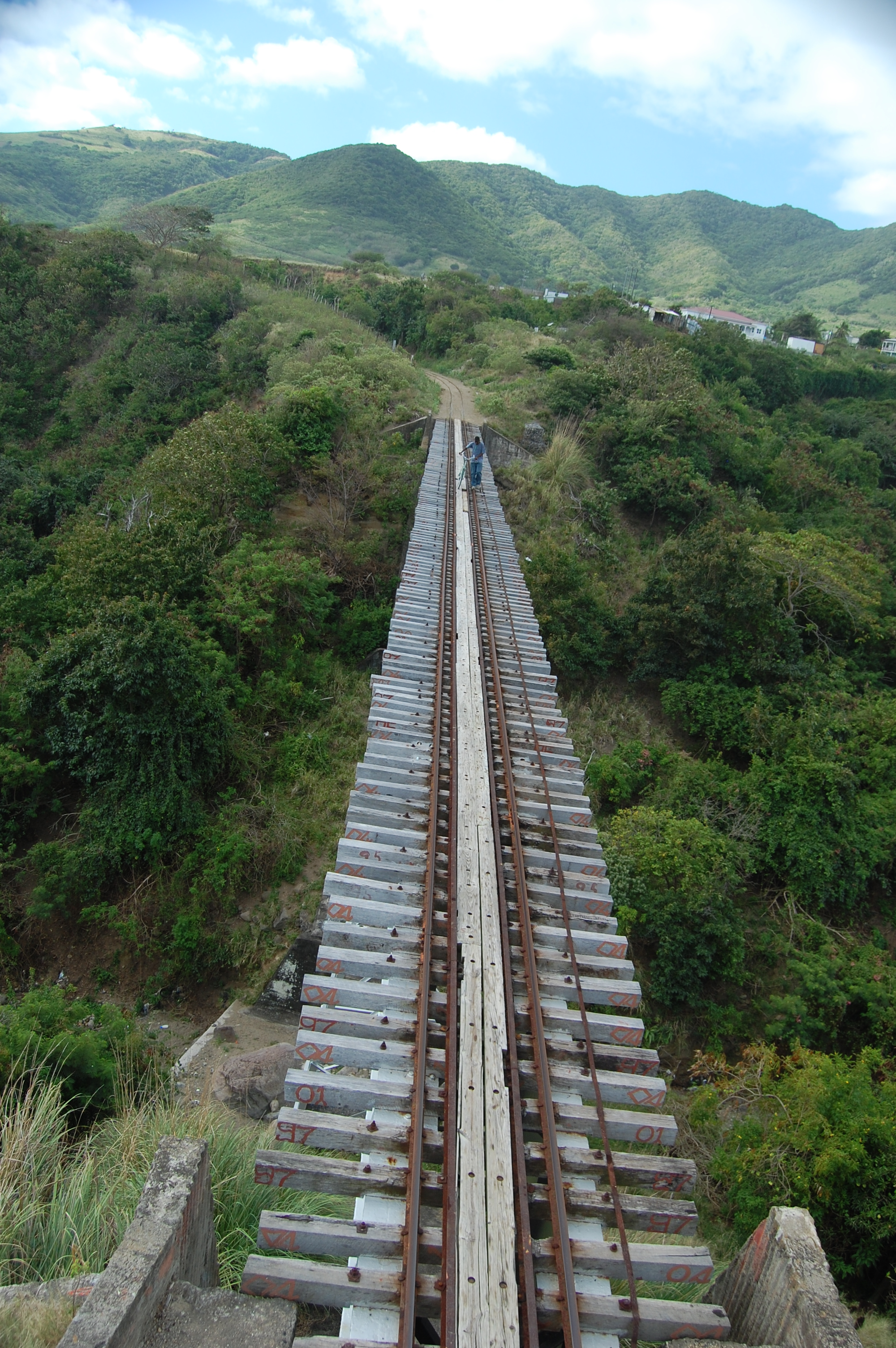

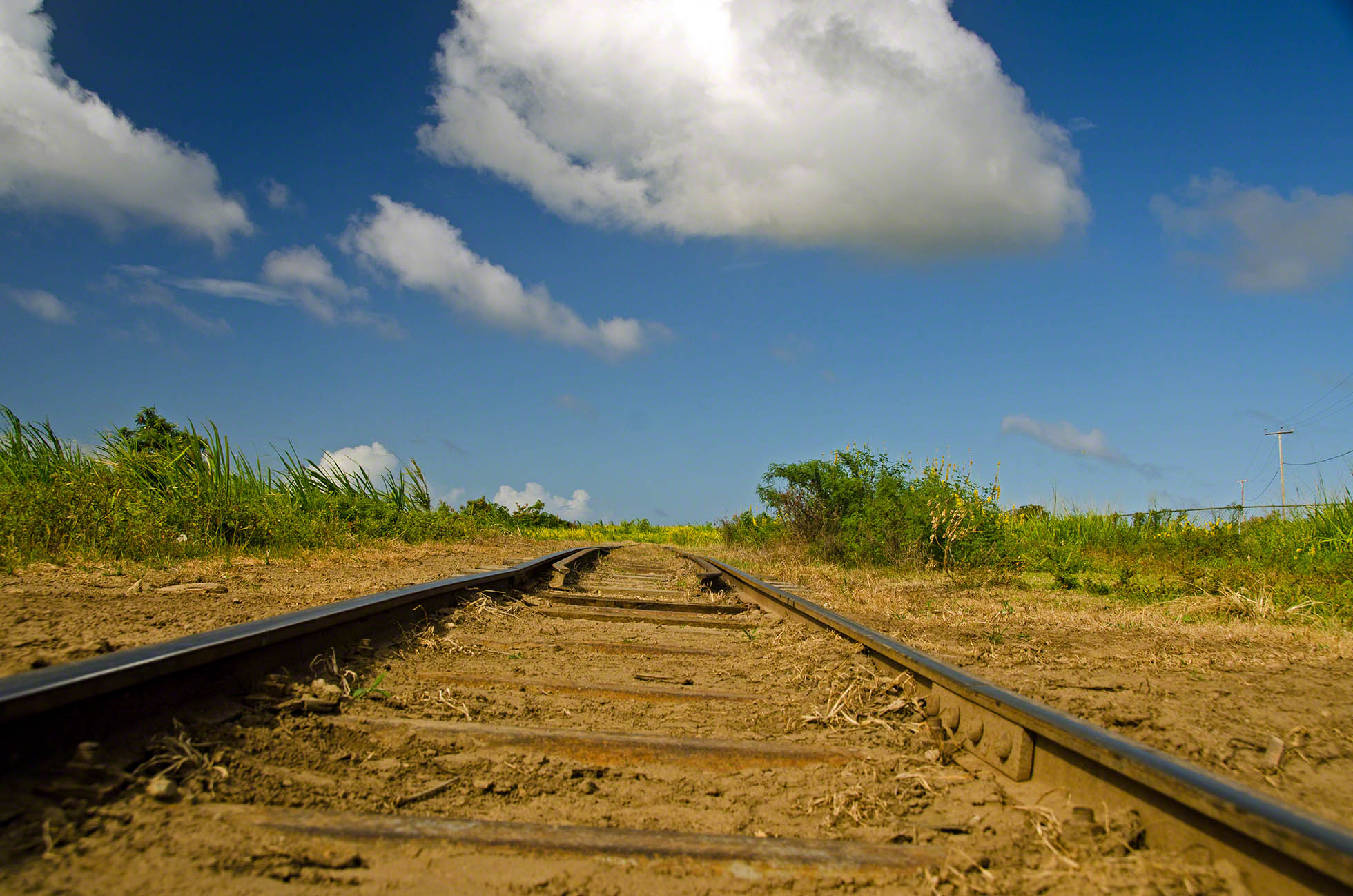

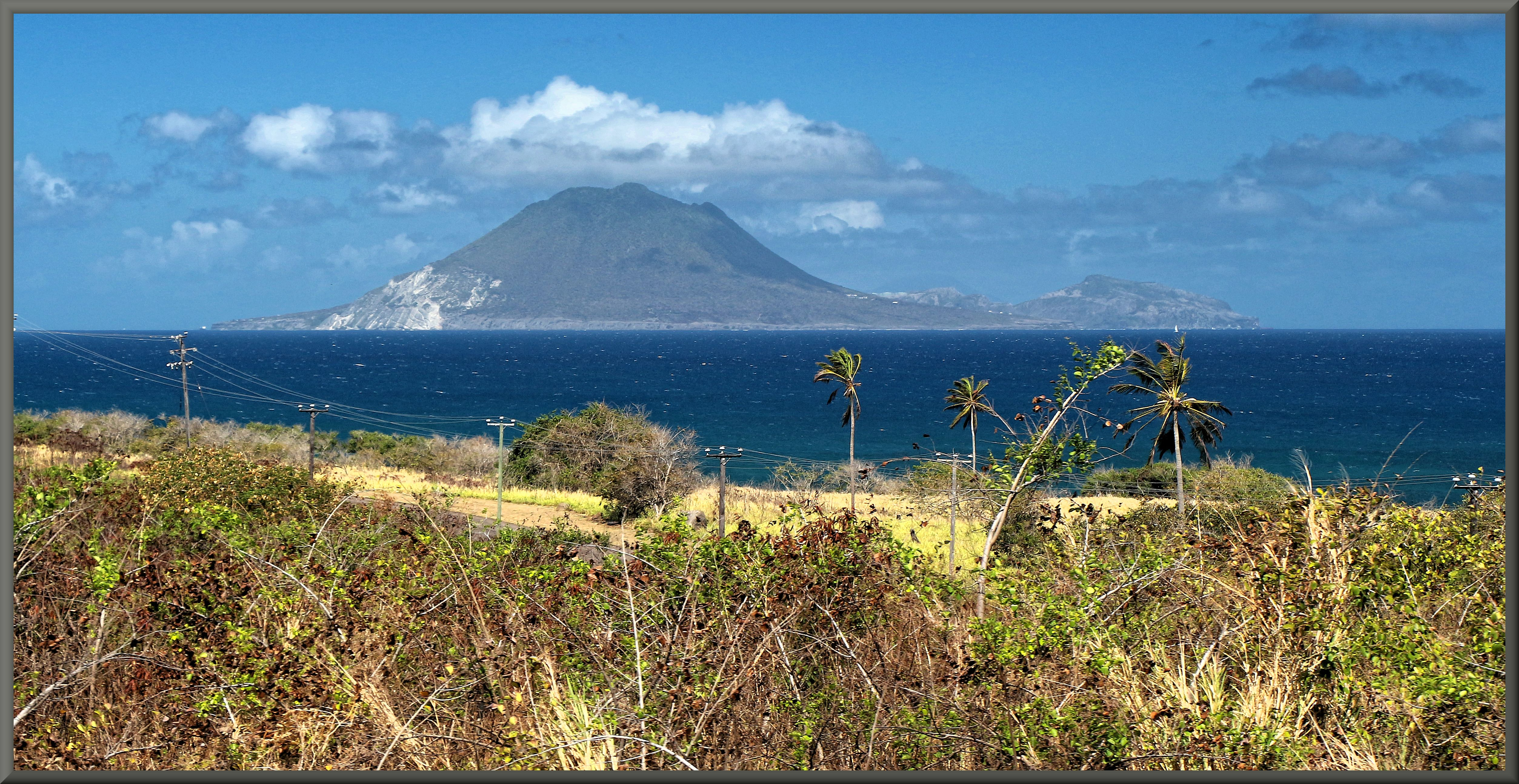

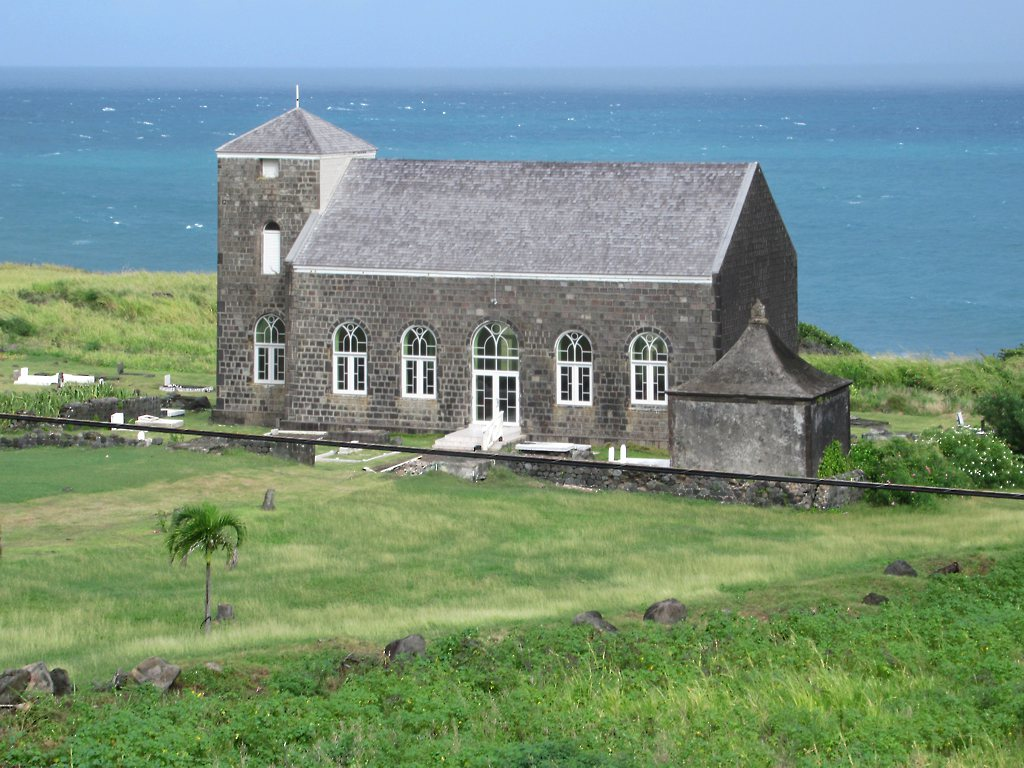
