= First Avenue =

First Avenue, 1st Avenue or 1 Av may refer to:

== Streets ==
- 1st Avenue (Chicago), a major thoroughfare of the city
- 1st Avenue (Seattle), a street in the city's downtown
- First Avenue (Manhattan), a major thoroughfare in New York City

== Schools ==
- First Avenue Middle School, Arcadia, California
- First Avenue School, Newark, New Jersey

== Other uses ==
- First Avenue (nightclub), a music venue in downtown Minneapolis
- 1 Av, the first day of Av, the fifth month of the Hebrew calendar

== See also ==
- First Avenue Records, a former record label
- First Avenue South Bridge in Seattle
- First Avenue station (PAAC) on the Port Authority of Allegheny County's light rail network
- First Avenue Public School, an elementary school in Ottawa, Ontario, Canada
- First Avenue (BMT Canarsie Line), a subway station
- List of highways numbered 1
- First Street (disambiguation)
