= List of M1 roads =

This is a list of roads designated M1. Road entries are sorted in alphabetical order by continent and country.

== Africa ==
=== Malawi ===
- M1 road (Malawi), a road in Malawi

=== South Africa ===
- M1 (Durban), a metropolitan route in Durban, South Africa
- M1 (Johannesburg), a metropolitan route in Johannesburg, South Africa
- M1 (Pretoria), a metropolitan route in Pretoria, South Africa

=== Zambia ===
- M1 road (Zambia), a road in Zambia

== Asia ==
=== Pakistan ===
- M-1 motorway (Pakistan), a road connecting Peshawar and Rawalpindi

=== Syria ===
- M1 motorway (Syria): a road in Syria connecting Latakia and Homs

== Europe ==
=== Belarus ===
- M1 highway (Belarus), a road connecting the border with Poland and the border with Russia

=== Hungary ===
- M1 motorway (Hungary), a road connecting Budapest and Győr and Hegyeshalom, border to Austria

=== Ireland ===
- M1 motorway (Republic of Ireland), a road connecting Dublin to the border with Northern Ireland

=== Russia ===
- M1 highway (Russia), a road connecting Moscow and the border with Belarus

=== Ukraine ===
- Highway M01 (Ukraine), a road connecting Kyiv and the border with Belarus

=== United Kingdom ===
==== England ====
- M1 motorway, a road in England connecting London and Leeds

==== Northern Ireland ====
- M1 motorway (Northern Ireland), a road connecting Belfast and Dungannon

== North America ==
=== United States ===
- M-1 (Michigan highway), a road in the United States

== Oceania ==
=== Australia ===
==== New South Wales / Queensland ====
- Bruce Highway
- Gateway Motorway
- Pacific Motorway (Brisbane–Brunswick Heads)
- Pacific Motorway (Grafton Bypass)
- Pacific Motorway (Port Macquarie–Coffs Harbour)
- Pacific Motorway (Sydney–Newcastle)
- Gore Hill Freeway
- Warringah Freeway
- Sydney Harbour Tunnel
- Cahill Expressway
- Eastern Distributor
- Southern Cross Drive
- General Holmes Drive
- Princes Motorway

==== South Australia ====
- South Eastern Freeway

==== Victoria ====
- Princes Freeway (East)
- Monash Freeway
- CityLink
- West Gate Freeway
- Princes Freeway (west)

== See also ==
- List of highways numbered 1
