= PKP class Lyd2 =

Lyd2
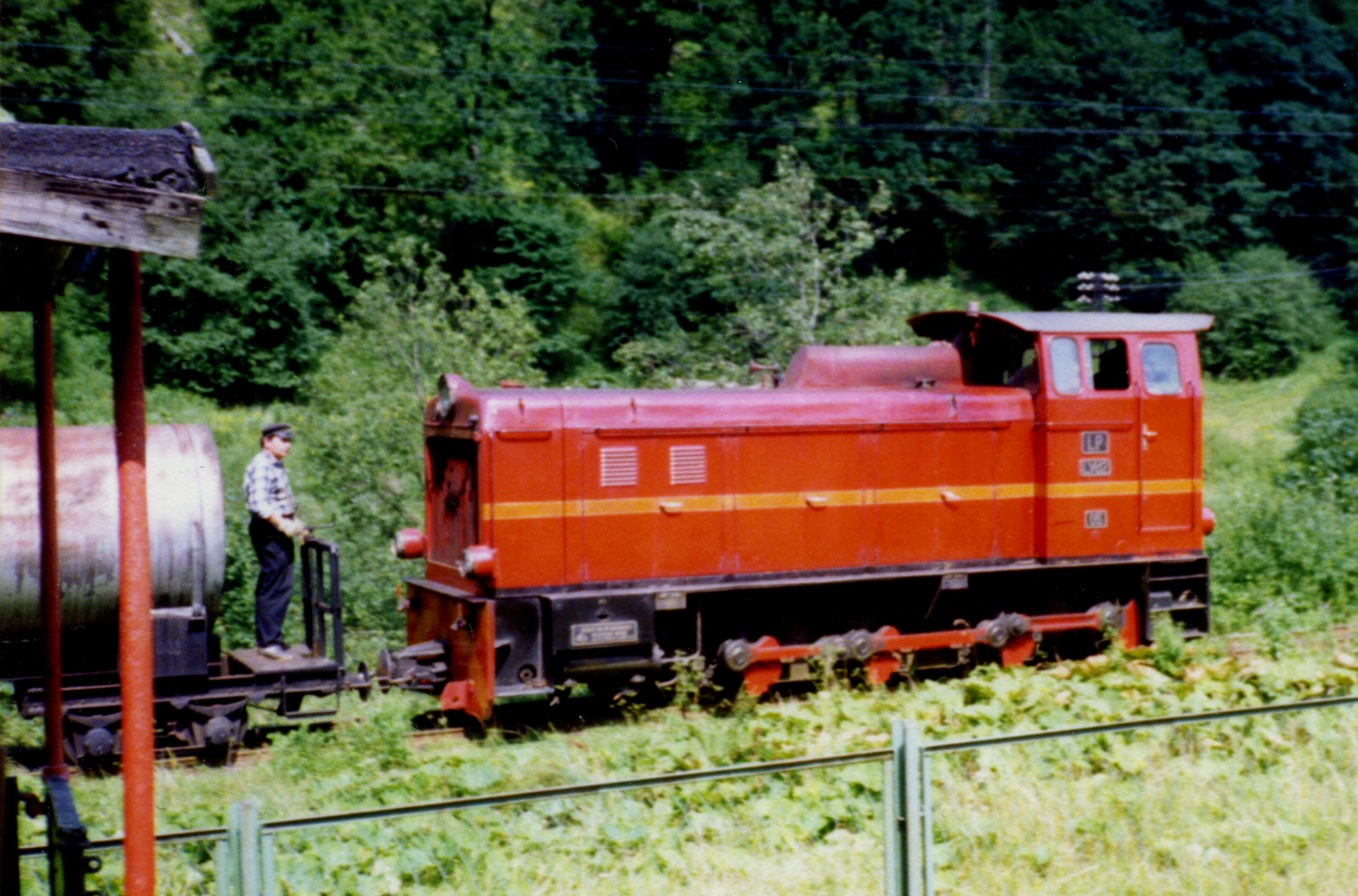
- Lyd2 of Bieszczady Forest Railway
Type and origin
- Power type: Diesel
- Builder: 23 August Locomotive Works, Bucharest
- Model: L30H
- Build date: 1976–1982
Specifications
- Configuration
  - Whyte: 0-4-0 Egyptian Versions; 0-6-0 European Versions
  - UIC: B Egyptian Versions; C European Versions
- Gauge: 600 mm (1 ft 11 5/8 in); 750 mm (2 ft 5 1/2 in); 785 mm (2 ft 6 29/32 in); 1,000 mm (3 ft 3 3/8 in)
- Driver dia.: 800 mm (2 ft 7 in) or 1,000 mm (3 ft 3 in)
- Length: 7.45 m (24 ft 5 in)
- Width: 2.65 m (8 ft 8 in)
- Adhesive weight: 7 t (6.9 long tons; 7.7 short tons) (empty) 8 t (7.9 long tons; 8.8 short tons)
- Loco weight: 21 t (20.7 long tons; 23.1 short tons) (empty) 24 t (23.6 long tons; 26.5 short tons)
Career
- Operators: PKP
- Class: Lyd2

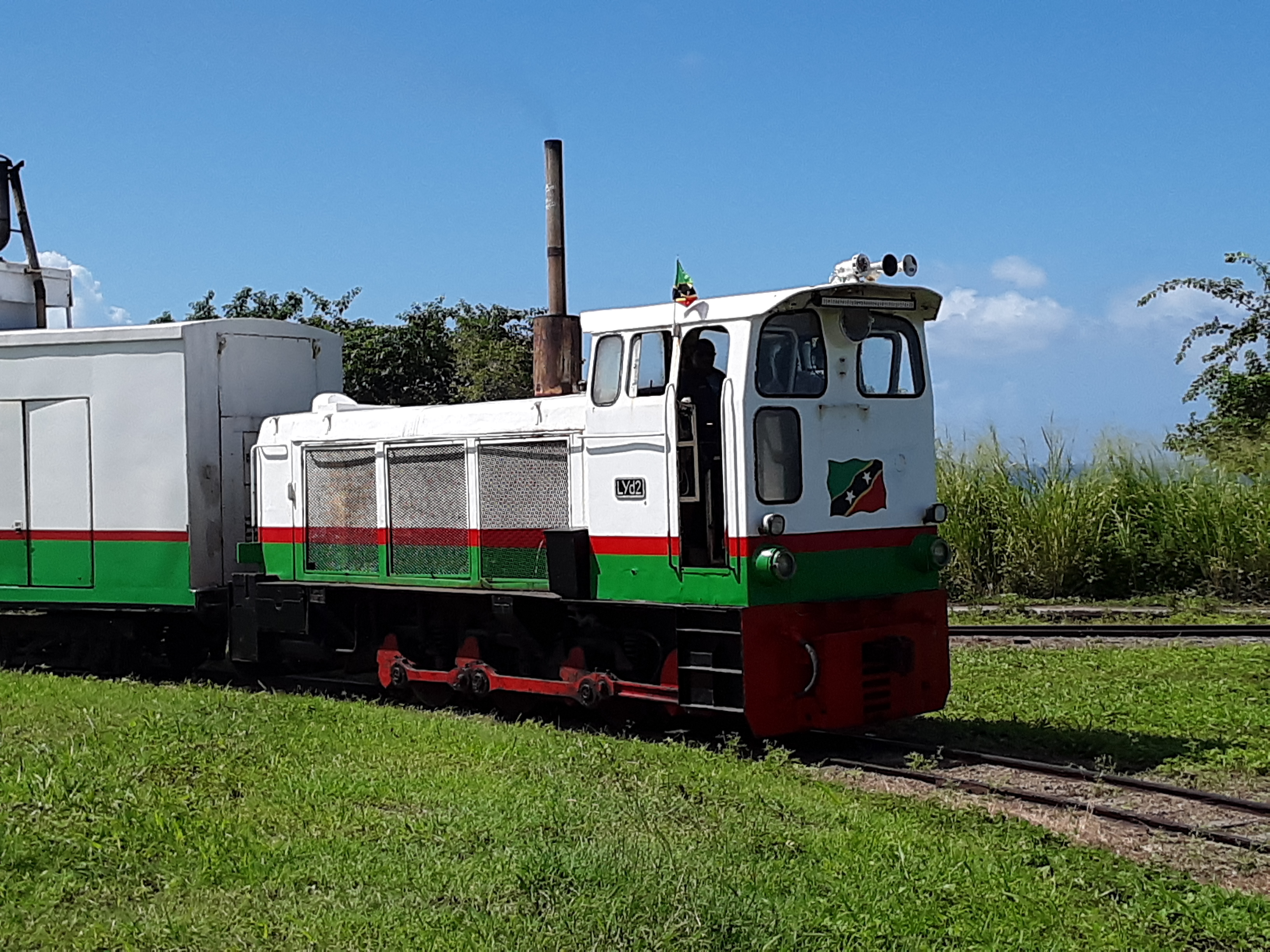
PKP class Lyd2 of the St. Kitts Scenic Railway

The PKP class Lyd2 (manufacturer designation L30H) is a narrow gauge diesel-hydraulic locomotive built by FAUR (formerly 23 August Works) in Romania, for use initially for sugar cane railway in Egypt with later variants developed for use in Poland, Romania and Albania. It was commissioned by Polskie Koleje Państwowe for service on the railways of Poland.

== Description ==
The Lyd2 classification gives the technical details of the locomotives in Polish State Railways (PKP) system. L indicates a narrow gauge locomotive, y indicates 3 axles (0-6-0 or C), d indicates diesel fuel, and finally, 2 indicates hydraulic transmission.

The locomotive is configured with a single cab, with driving positions for both directions. The diesel engine (Maybach MB83B built under licence) produces 345 brake horsepower (257 kW) though documentation shows a peak rating of 415 bhp (309 kW) from a normally aspirated engine. Transmission occurs via hydraulic transmission TH5R-V6. Train braking is via the single pipe air system.

== Deployment and usage ==
=== Poland ===
15 locomotives are listed as operative in Poland during 2013. They are split between Białośliwie, Żnin, Cisna (Bieszczady Forest Railway), Bytom Karb (Lyd2-101 since 2020), Środa Wielkopolska (since 2020), Piaseczno and Koszalin depots. Another 14 locomotives are listed as non-operational.

=== Outside Poland ===
==== Czech Republic ====
Slezské zemské dráhy, a company which operates passenger trains on narrow gauge Třemešná ve Slezsku – Osoblaha Railway during summer, purchased a Lyd2 in 2005.

==== Germany ====
The Zittauer Schmalspurbahn has Lyd2 No. 199 013.

The Döllnitzbahn has two Lyd2 locomotives, numbered 199 033-2 and 199 034–0, both built in 1981.

==== St. Kitts ====
St. Kitts Scenic Railway owns three of the class.

==== United Kingdom ====
One locomotive (works number 24376) has been sold to the South Tynedale Railway, previously working at the Great Whipsnade Railway in Bedfordshire.

Three locomotives (PKP numbers 58 and 60 and LP Number 08) are based at the Welsh Highland Heritage Railway in Porthmadog.
