= List of N1 roads =

This is a list of roads designated N1. Entries are sorted in alphabetical order by country.

- N1 road (Bangladesh), a road connecting Dhaka to Cox's Bazar through Chittagong
- N1 road (Belgium), a road connecting Brussels and Antwerp
- N1 Highway (Republic of Congo), a national highway connecting Pointe-Noire and Brazzaville
- Carretera Central (Cuba), known as CC or N–1
- National Road 1 (Democratic Republic of the Congo)
- N1 road (France), a road connecting Calais and Paris
- N1 road (Gabon), a road connecting Libreville and Tchibanga
- N1 road (Guinea), a road connecting Conakry and Nzerekore
- N1 road (Ghana), a road connecting Elubo, Cape Coast, Winneba, and Accra to Aflao
- N1 road (Ireland), a road connecting Dublin and the border with Northern Ireland
- N1 road (Mauritania), a road connecting Bir Moghrein to Nouakchott, via Atar
- N1 road (Morocco)
- N1 highway (Niger), a road connecting Niamey, Maradi and Zinder
- N1 highway (Philippines), a primary national highway that mostly follows the route of Asian Highway 26
- N1 road (Senegal), a road connecting Dakar to Kidira and Mali
- N1 road (South Africa), a road connecting Cape Town, Johannesburg, Pretoria and the Zimbabwe border
- N1 road (Switzerland), a road connecting St. Margrethen and Geneva
- Navajo Route 1, also known as N1, a former road connecting U.S. Route 89 to New Mexico in the Navajo Nation
- N1 highway (Nebraska), a United States road connecting Highway 34 in Elmwood and Highway 34 and Highway 75 in Murray

== See also ==
- List of highways numbered 1
