= First Street station =

First Street station or 1st Street station

- First Street station (IRT Second Avenue Line), a demolished elevated train station in New York City
- First Street station (Miami), a Metromover station in Miami
- 1st Street station (Los Angeles Metro), a Los Angeles Metro station
- 1 Street Southwest station, a light rail station in Calgary, Alberta
- First Street station (Oakland), a demolished Southern Pacific Railroad station in Oakland, California

== See also ==
- First Street (disambiguation)
