= List of highways numbered 0 =

Route 0, or Highway 0, may refer to routes in the following countries:

== Belgium ==
- R0 motorway (Belgium), the ring road around Brussels

== Czech Republic ==
- D0 motorway (Czech Republic), bypassing Prague

== Hungary ==
- M0 motorway (Hungary), bypassing Budapest

== Numbered streets ==
- 0 Avenue in British Columbia, Canada

== Future highways ==
- Bucharest Ring Motorway, in Romania, when constructed, will be numbered A0.

== Fictional ==
- Highway 0 from Jet Set Radio Future
- Interstate 0 from I-0
- Route 0 from Kentucky Route Zero
- Highway Zero, a novel by Billy Lawrence

== See also ==
- U.S. Route 2, the highway carrying the designation assigned to avoid a U.S. Route 0

Preceded by —	Lists of highways 0	Succeeded by 1
