= List of highways numbered S1 =

Highways numbered S1 by country

The following is a list of highways numbered S1.

== China ==
- S1 Expressway (Guangdong)
- S1 Expressway (Henan)
- S1 Expressway (Hubei)
- S1 Expressway (Shandong)
- S1 Expressway (Shanghai)
- S1 Expressway (Sichuan)
- S1 Expressway (Tianjin)
- S1 Expressway (Tibet)
- S1 Expressway (Zhejiang)

== Georgia ==
- S1 Highway

== Poland ==
- Expressway S1 (Poland)

== United States ==
- New Jersey Route S1 (former)

== See also ==
- List of highways numbered 1
