= List of B1 roads =

This is a list of roads designated B1. Roads entries are sorted in the countries alphabetical order.

- B1 road (Croatia), the designation of an expressway route in Croatia
- B1 road (Cyprus), a road in Cyprus
- B1 highway (Germany), a German road
- B1 road (Kenya), a road connected to the A1 road
- B1 road (Namibia), an important North-South road
- B1 road (Sri Lanka), a road connecting Akkaraipattu and Warapathanchenai
- B1 road (United Kingdom) may refer to:
  - B1 road (Northern Ireland), a road connecting Downpatrick and Ardglass
- B1 road (United States of America) may refer to:
  - B-1 corridor (Appalachian Development Highway System)

== See also ==
- List of highways numbered 1, a disambiguation page
- List of A1 roads, a disambiguation page
