= Anyang 1st Street =

Commercial hub in Anyang, South Korea

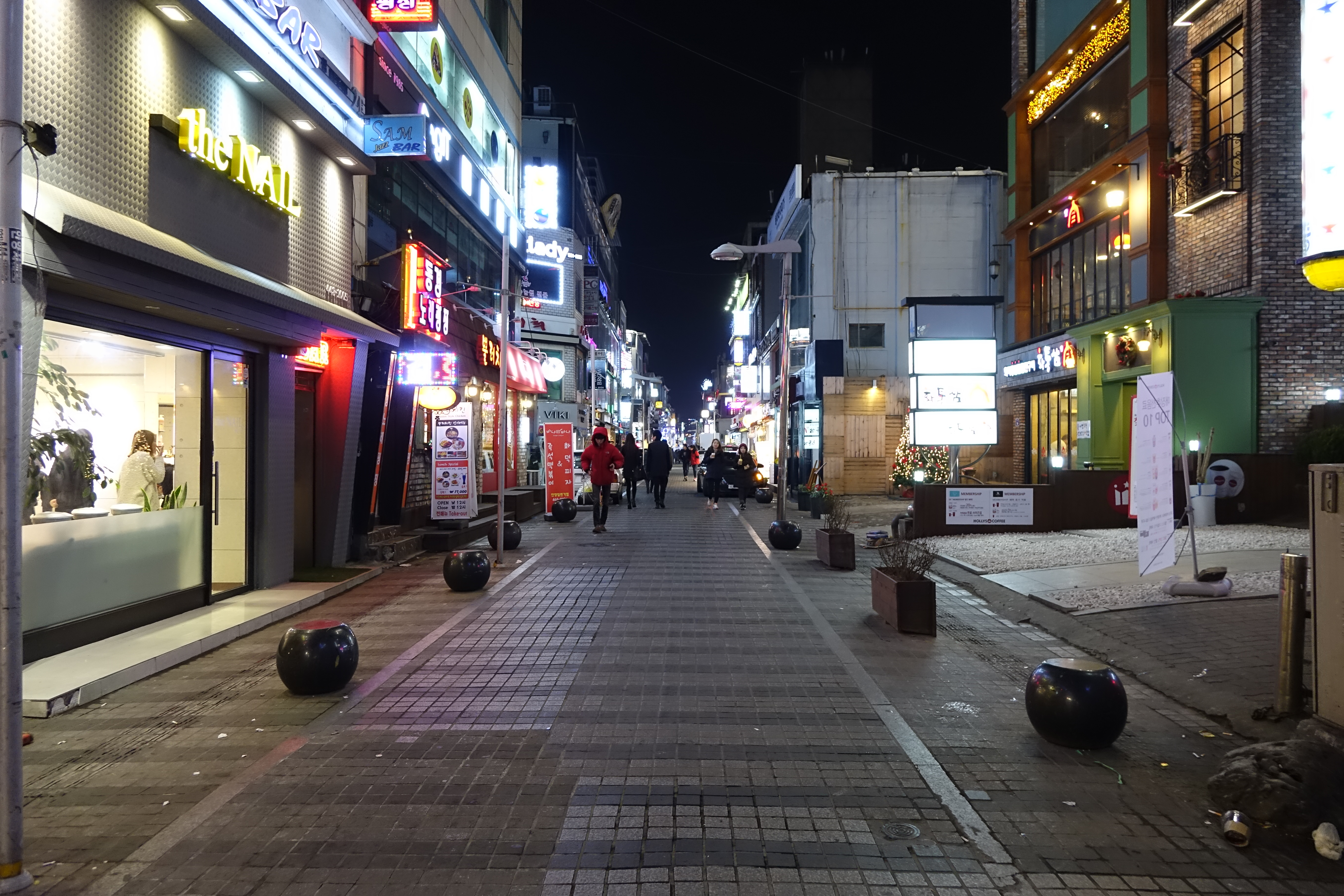
Anyang 1st Street

Anyang 1st Street (Korean: 안양일번가; Hanja: 安養一番街) is the commercial hub in Manan District, Anyang, South Korea. Anyang 1st Street is also the most crowded area in Anyang. Anyang 1st Street has underground shopping malls, a department store, many shopping stores, bars, restaurants, movie theaters, banks, bookstores, clinics, etc.

The Anyang Ilbang Street Shopping Mall was built by Jangyang Industrial Co., Ltd. in June 1982. The Anyang Station underground shopping center was awarded a D grade for disaster risk facilities following a precise safety diagnosis in 1999. Anyang City acquired it in 2002. In October 2004, it signed an agreement with Anyang Station Shopping Mall Co., Ltd. as a privately invested company. The construction, remodeling, and renovation work was completed in March 2006, following the commencement of the project in November 2004. A total of 43 billion won was invested in the project for one year and four months, and it was opened on April 15, 2006. It will be managed and operated by Anyang Station Shopping Mall for 22 years until 2028 and then Anyang City will take over. There are 415 stores in the underground shopping mall, covering an area of 15,824 m2 (4,786 pyeong), which includes stores, public sidewalks, and other facilities. Additionally, there is 1,653 m2 (500 pyeong) on the 8th floor, with 2 stories below ground level.
