= List of highways numbered 1 =

The following highways are numbered 1.

For roads numbered A1, see list of A1 roads. For roads numbered B1, see list of B1 roads. For roads numbered M1, see List of M1 roads. For roads numbered N1, see list of N1 roads. For roads numbered S1, see List of highways numbered S1.

== International ==
- AH1 Asian Highway 1, an international route from Japan to the Turkish-Bulgarian border
- E1 European route E1
- E001 European route E001
- Cairo–Dakar Highway

== Afghanistan ==
- Highway 1 (Afghanistan), also called A01 and formally called the Ring Road, circles Afghanistan connecting Kabul, Ghazni, Kandahar, Farah, Herat, and Mazar.

== Albania ==
- National Road 1 (Albania), road running from border Montenegro (Hani i Hotit) to Tirana.
- Albania–Kosovo Highway

== Algeria ==
- A1 North–South Highway (Algeria)
- National Route 1 (Algeria)

== Andorra ==
- CG-1

== Argentina ==
- National Route 1
- National Route A001
- Santa Fe Provincial Highway 01

== Australia ==
- Highway 1 (Australia), a highway connecting all of the country's state capitals and also Darwin, Northern Territory.
- All Motorways in the route of National Highway 1
- Tolled Motorway in the route of National Highway 1
- All roads with national significance on National Highway 1
- In QLD and WA
- Part of it is the NT and SA
- Ring Route 1, South Australia
- – Detour of the M1 Pacific Motorway
- Wollogorang Road (Borroloola to Queensland Border) replaces National Route 1
- Highway 1 (Tasmania)

== Austria ==
- West Autobahn

== Bangladesh ==
- N1

== Belarus ==
- M1 highway (Belarus)

== Belgium ==
- Autoroute A1 - Autosnelweg A1 - Autobahn A1

== Bolivia ==
- National Route 1 (Bolivia)

== Bosnia and Herzegovina ==
- A1 (Bosnia and Herzegovina)

== Bulgaria ==
- Trakia motorway
- I-1 road (Bulgaria)

== Cambodia ==
- National Highway 1 (Cambodia)

== Canada ==
Parts of the Trans-Canada Highway

- Alberta Highway 1
- British Columbia Highway 1
- Manitoba Highway 1
- Newfoundland and Labrador Route 1
- Prince Edward Island Route 1
- Saskatchewan Highway 1

Other instances of Highway 1

- New Brunswick Route 1
- Nova Scotia Trunk 1
- Northwest Territories Highway 1
- Quebec Route 1 (former)
- Yukon Highway 1

== Chile ==
- Chile Route 1

== People's Republic of China ==
- G1 Expressway
  - G1N Expressway
  - G0111 Expressway
- S01 Expressway (Anhui)
- S1 Expressway (Guangdong)
- S1 Expressway (Henan)
- S1 Expressway (Hubei)
- S01 Expressway (Hunan)
- S1 Expressway (Shandong)
- S1 Expressway (Shanghai)
- S1 Expressway (Sichuan)
- S1 Expressway (Tianjin)
- S1 Expressway (Tibet)
- S1 Expressway (Zhejiang)

== Republic of China (Taiwan) ==
- National Freeway 1
  - Provincial Highway 1 (Taiwan)

== Colombia ==
- National Route 1

== Costa Rica ==
- National Route 1

== Cuba ==
- Autopista A1
  - Autopista A1–1
- Highway N–1
  - Highway 1–N–1
  - Highway 2–N–1
  - Highway 3–N–1
  - Highway 4–N–1
  - Highway 5–N–1
  - Highway 6–N–1
- Highway 1–1
- Highway 1–1 (former)
- Highway 5–1 (former)

== Cyprus ==
- A1 motorway (Cyprus)
- B1 road (Cyprus)

== Czechia ==
- D1 from Prague to Ostrava

== Democratic Republic of the Congo ==
- National Road 1 (Democratic Republic of the Congo)

== Djibouti ==
- RN-1 (Djibouti)

== Dominican Republic ==
- DR-1

== Estonia ==
- Estonian national road 1

== Equatorial Guinea ==
- AP-1 Motorway (Equatorial Guinea)

== Finland ==
- Finnish national road 1
- Åland Islands Highway 1

== France ==
- Autoroute A1
- Route nationale 1

== Georgia ==
- S1 Highway
- SH1 Road (Georgia)

== Germany ==
- Bundesautobahn 1
- Bundesstraße 1

== Ghana ==
- N1 road (Ghana)

== Greece ==
- A1 motorway
- EO1 road

== Hong Kong ==
- Route 1 (Hong Kong)

== Hungary ==
- M1 motorway (Hungary)
- Main road 1 (Hungary)

== Iceland ==
- Route 1 (Iceland)

== India ==
- National Expressway 1 (India)
- National Highway 1 (India)
- State Highway 1 (Bihar)
- State Highway 1 (Jharkhand)
- State Highway 1 (Karnataka)
- State Highway 1 (Kerala)
- State Highway 1 (Madhya Pradesh)
- State Highway 1 (Maharashtra)
- State Highway 1 (Odisha)
- State Highway 1 (Rajasthan)
- State Highway 1 (Telangana)
- State Highway 1 (West Bengal)

== Indonesia ==
- Indonesian National Route 1

== Iran ==
- Freeway 1

== Iraq ==
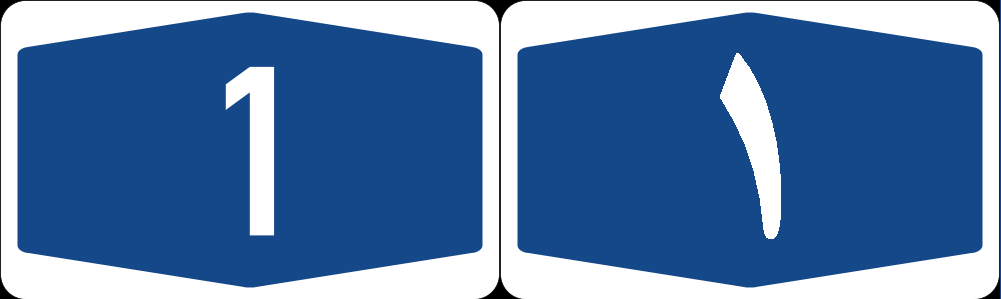
- Freeway 1
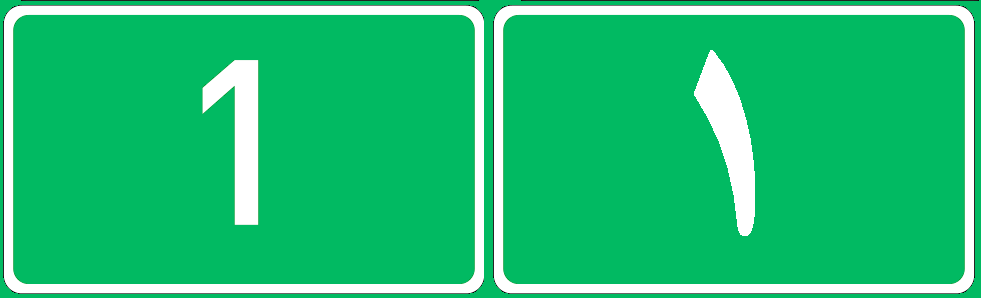
- Highway 1

== Ireland ==
- M1 motorway (Republic of Ireland)
- N1 road (Ireland)

== Israel ==
- Highway 1

== Italy ==
- Autostrada A1 (Italy)
- RA 1
- Strada statale 1
- T1

== Japan ==
- National Route 1
- Meishin Expressway
- Tōmei Expressway
  - Isewangan Expressway
  - Shin-Meishin Expressway
  - Shin-Tōmei Expressway
- Route 1 (Hanshin Expressway) in Osaka
- Route 1 (Nagoya Expressway)
- Route 1 (Shuto Expressway) in Tokyo

== Kazakhstan ==
- A1 highway (Kazakhstan)

== Laos ==
- Route 1C (Laos)
- Route 1E (Laos)
- Route 1I (Laos)

== Latvia ==
- A1 road (Latvia)

== Lithuania ==
- A1 highway (Lithuania)

== Luxembourg ==
- A1 motorway (Luxembourg)

== Malaysia ==
- FT 1 Malaysia Federal Route 1
- North–South Expressway Northern Route
- FT 1 Malaysia Federal Route 1 (Sabah)
- FT 1 Malaysia Federal Route 1 (Sarawak)
- A1 Jalan Jelapang
- B1 Jalan Meru
- J1 Iskandar Coastal Highway
- K1 Jalan Bedong—Kuala Muda
- N1 Federal Route 1265 (formerly N1)
- P1 Jalan Permatang Bendahari

== Martinique ==
- A1 autoroute (Martinique)

== Mexico ==
- Mexican Federal Highway 1

== Moldova ==
- M1 highway (Moldova)
- R1 road (Moldova)

== Morocco ==
- Rabat–Tangier expressway
- National Route 1 (Morocco)

== Myanmar (Burma) ==
- National Highway 1 (Myanmar)

== Namibia ==
- A1 road (Namibia)

== Nepal ==
- Mahendra Highway

== Netherlands ==
- Rijksweg 1

== New Zealand ==
- State Highway 1 (New Zealand)

== Nicaragua ==
- NIC-1

== Niger ==
- Route nationale 1 (Niger), main east–west highway

== Nigeria ==
- A1 highway (Nigeria)

== North Macedonia ==
- A1 motorway (North Macedonia)

== Oman ==
- Route 1 (Oman)

== Pakistan ==
- M1 motorway (Pakistan)

== Panama ==
- Highway 1 is the Pan-American Highway

== Paraguay ==
- National Route 1

== Peru ==
- Highway 1

== Philippines ==
- C-1 Circumferential Road 1
- R-1 Radial Road 1
- N1 highway (Philippines)
- E1 expressway (Philippines)

== Poland ==
- A1 autostrada (Poland)
- Expressway S1 (Poland)
- National road 1 (Poland)

== Portugal ==
- A1 motorway (Portugal)

== Romania ==
- Drumul Național 1
- A1 motorway (Romania)

== Russia ==
- M1 highway (Russia)

== Senegal ==
- Autoroute A1
- N1 road (Senegal)

== Serbia ==
- A1 motorway (Serbia)

== Slovakia ==
- D1 motorway (Slovakia)
- R1 expressway (Slovakia)

== Slovenia ==
- A1 motorway (Slovenia)

== South Africa ==
- N1 road (South Africa)
- M1 (East London)
- M1 (Johannesburg)
- M1 (Pretoria)
- M1 (Durban)
- M1 (Port Elizabeth)

== South Korea ==
- Gyeongbu Expressway
- National Route 1

== Spain ==
- Autovía A-1
- Autopista AP-1
- Autovía AS-I
- A1 motorway (Extremadura)
- Autopista GC-1
- R-1 motorway (Spain)
- A1 motorway (Aragon)
- Autovía RM-1

== Sri Lanka ==
- A1 Colombo-Kandy Road
- E01 Southern Lanka Distributor

== Switzerland ==
- A1 motorway (Switzerland)
  - A1h motorway (Switzerland)
  - A1l motorway (Switzerland)
  - A1.1 motorway (Switzerland)

== Tanzania ==
- T1 road (Tanzania)

== Thailand ==
- Thailand Route 1 (Phahonyothin Road)

== Tunisia ==
- A1 motorway (Tunisia)

== Turkey ==
- Otoyol 1

== Ukraine ==
- Highway M01 (Ukraine)
- Highway H01 (Ukraine)

== United Kingdom and Crown dependencies ==
- M1 motorway
- A1 road (Great Britain)

- A1(M) motorway

- A1 road (Isle of Man)
- A1 road (Jersey)
- M1 motorway (Northern Ireland)
- A1 road (Northern Ireland)

== United States ==
- Interstate A-1 (unsigned)
- Interstate H-1
- U.S. Route 1
- New England Route 1 (former)
- Alabama State Route 1
  - County Route 1 (Jackson County, Alabama)
  - County Route 1 (Lee County, Alabama)
- Alaska Route 1
- County Route 1 (Mohave County, Arizona)
- Arkansas Highway 1
- California State Route 1
  - County Route A1 (California)
  - County Route B1 (California)
  - County Route C1 (California)
  - County Route D1 (California)
  - County Route E1 (California)
  - County Route G1 (California)
  - County Route J1 (California)
  - County Route N1 (California)
  - County Route R1 (California)
  - County Route S1 (California)
- Colorado State Highway 1
- Delaware Route 1
- Florida State Road A1A
- Georgia State Route 1
  - Georgia State Route 1E (former)
- Idaho State Highway 1
- Illinois Route 1
- Indiana State Road 1
- Iowa Highway 1
- K-1 (Kansas highway)
- Kentucky Route 1
- Louisiana Highway 1
- M-1 (Michigan highway)
- Minnesota State Highway 1
  - County Route 1 (Aitkin County, Minnesota)
  - County Route 1 (Anoka County, Minnesota)
  - County Route 1 (Beltrami County, Minnesota)
  - County Route 1 (Cass County, Minnesota)
  - County Route 1 (Chisago County, Minnesota)
- Mississippi Highway 1
- Missouri Route 1
- Montana Highway 1
- Nebraska Highway 1
- Nevada State Route 1 (former)
- New Jersey Route 1 (former)
  - County Route 1 (Monmouth County, New Jersey)
- New Mexico State Road 1
- New York
  - County Route 1 (Albany County, New York)
  - County Route 1 (Allegany County, New York)
  - County Route 1 (Cayuga County, New York)
  - County Route 1 (Chautauqua County, New York)
  - County Route 1 (Chemung County, New York)
  - County Route 1 (Chenango County, New York)
  - County Route 1 (Clinton County, New York)
  - County Route 1 (Delaware County, New York)
  - County Route 1 (Dutchess County, New York)
  - County Route 1 (Erie County, New York)
  - County Route 1 (Franklin County, New York)
  - County Route 1 (Genesee County, New York)
  - County Route 1 (Greene County, New York)
  - County Route 1 (Hamilton County, New York)
  - County Route 1 (Herkimer County, New York)
  - County Route 1 (Jefferson County, New York)
  - County Route 1 (Lewis County, New York)
  - County Route 1 (Livingston County, New York)
  - County Route 1 (Madison County, New York)
  - County Route 1 (Monroe County, New York)
  - County Route 1 (Montgomery County, New York)
  - County Route 1 (Nassau County, New York)
  - County Route 1 (Oneida County, New York)
  - County Route 1 (Onondaga County, New York)
  - County Route 1 (Ontario County, New York)
  - County Route 1 (Orange County, New York)
  - County Route 1 (Orleans County, New York)
  - County Route 1 (Oswego County, New York)
  - County Route 1 (Otsego County, New York)
  - County Route 1 (Rensselaer County, New York)
  - County Route 1 (Rockland County, New York)
  - County Route 1 (St. Lawrence County, New York)
  - County Route 1 (Saratoga County, New York)
  - County Route 1 (Schenectady County, New York)
  - County Route 1 (Schoharie County, New York)
  - County Route 1 (Schuyler County, New York)
  - County Route 1 (Steuben County, New York)
  - County Route 1 (Suffolk County, New York)
  - County Route 1 (Tioga County, New York)
  - County Route 1 (Ulster County, New York)
  - County Route 1 (Warren County, New York)
  - County Route 1 (Washington County, New York)
  - County Route 1 (Wyoming County, New York)
  - County Route 1 (Yates County, New York)
- North Dakota Highway 1
- Ohio State Route 1 (former)
- Oklahoma State Highway 1
- Pacific Highway No. 1 (Oregon)
- Pennsylvania Route 1 (former)
- Tennessee State Route 1
- Texas State Highway 1 (former)
  - Texas State Highway Loop 1
  - Texas State Highway NASA Road 1
  - Texas Farm to Market Road 1
  - Texas Ranch Road 1
- Utah State Route 1 (former)

Territories

- Interstate PRI-1 (unsigned)
- American Samoa Highway 001
- Guam Highway 1
- Puerto Rico Highway 1
  - Puerto Rico Highway 1P

== Uruguay ==
- Route 1 Gral. Manuel Oribe

== Vietnam ==
- National Route 1 (Vietnam)

== Zambia ==
- T1 road (Zambia)
- M1 road (Zambia)

== See also ==
- First Avenue (disambiguation)
- First Street (disambiguation)

Preceded by 0	Lists of highways 1	Succeeded by 2
