= A1 motorway (Extremadura) =

Motorway in Extremadura, Spain

Coordinates: 39.9731°N 6.1115°W

Autovía EX-A1

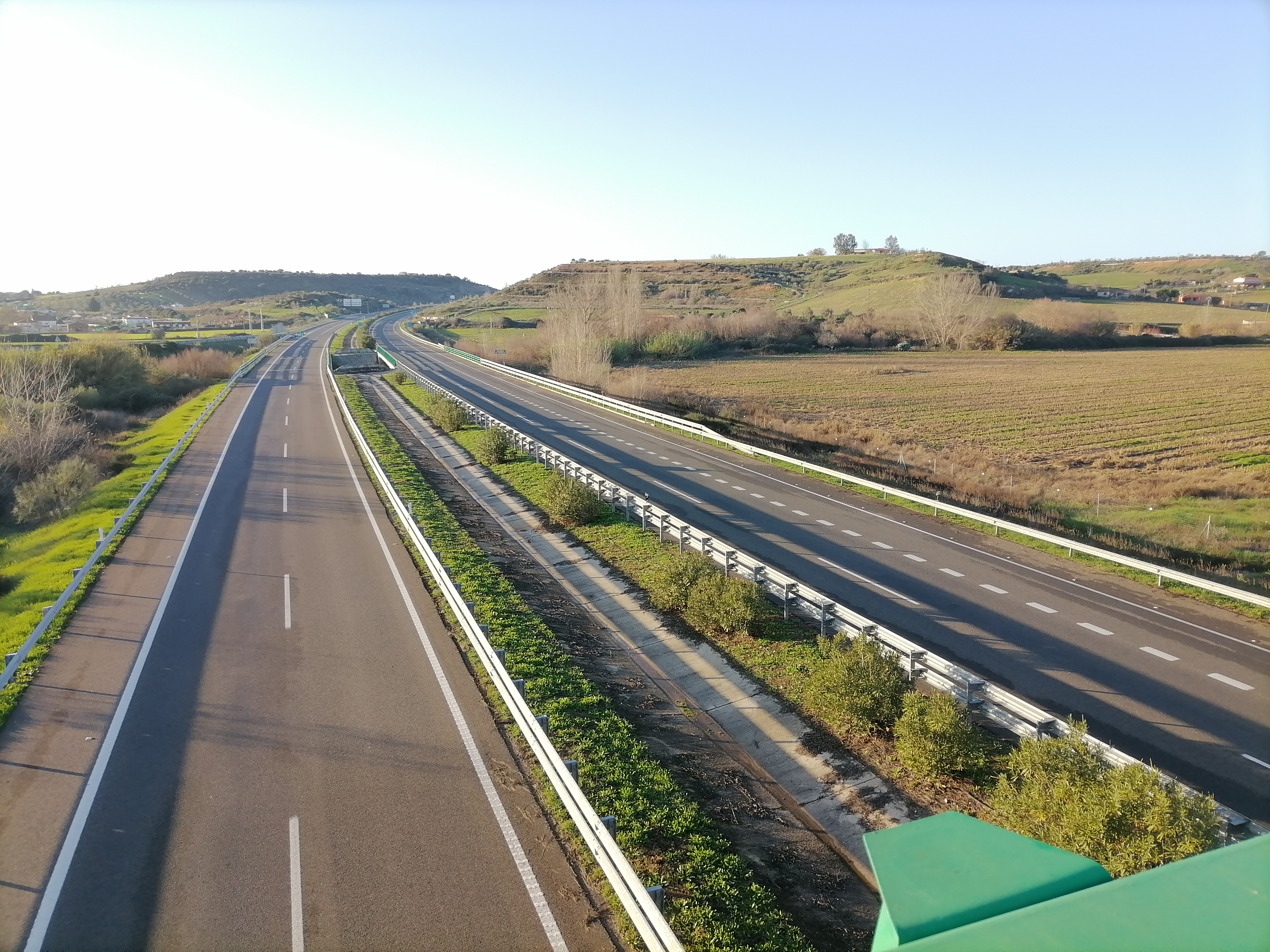

Major junctions
- From: A-5 (E90) in Navalmoral de la Mata
- A-66 (E803) in Plasencia
- To: EX-108 in Moraleja

Location
- Country: Spain
- Major cities: Navalmoral de la Mata, Plasencia, Coria, Moraleja

Highway system
- Highways in Spain; Autopistas and autovías; National Roads

The EX-A1 is a 123-kilometre-long (76 mi) motorway in Extremadura, Spain.

It is part of the regional network. It connects the most populated municipalities of the north of Extremadura, including Navalmoral de la Mata, Plasencia, Coria, and Moraleja. Likewise, the stretch from Plasencia to Navalmoral de la Mata connects the A-66 (Ruta de la Plata) with the A-5 (Autovía del Suroeste). The stretch from Coria to Moraleja opened in 2015. The project to enlarge the road to the Portuguese border was submitted to public information in March 2025.
