= A1 autoroute (Martinique) =

Controlled-access highway in Martinique

Coordinates: 14.619299°N 61.000557°W

A1 autoroute

Route information
- Length: 7 km (4.3 mi)
- Existed: 1963–present

Major junctions
- From: Aimé Césaire International Airport, Le Lamentin
- To: Fort-de-France

Location
- Country: France
- Overseas region and department: Martinique

Highway system
- Transport in Martinique

The A1 autoroute in Martinique (officially designated as A1 (972)) is the only autoroute on the French autoroute system built outside Metropolitan France. This short autoroute, only 7 km (4 mi) in length, connects Aimé Césaire International Airport in Le Lamentin to Fort-de-France.

Unlike some autoroutes in Metropolitan France, the A1 (972) is toll-free.

== Exits ==
Unlike the Metropolitan France autoroutes, the exits along A1 are not numbered:

- Aéroport : Aéroport Aimé Césaire
- La Lézarde : Le Lamentin-Z.I. La Lézarde, Z.I. Place d'Armes
- Carrière : La Trinité, Le Robert, Le Lamentin
- Les Mangles : Le Lamentin-Acajou, Z.A. Les Mangles, Centre commercial La Galleria
- Jambette : Fort-de-France-Z.A. Jambette, Quartiers Californie, Hauts de Californie
- La Meynard : Fort-de-France-Pointe des Grives, Z.A.C. Rivière Roche, C.H.U. La Meynard
- Dillon : Fort-de-France-Sud, Quartier Sainte-Thérèse, Quartier Châteauboeuf, Quartier Dillon, Z.P., Gare Maritime
