= Le Train des Plantations =

Heritage railway in Martinique

Coordinates: 14.7836889°N 60.9984647°W

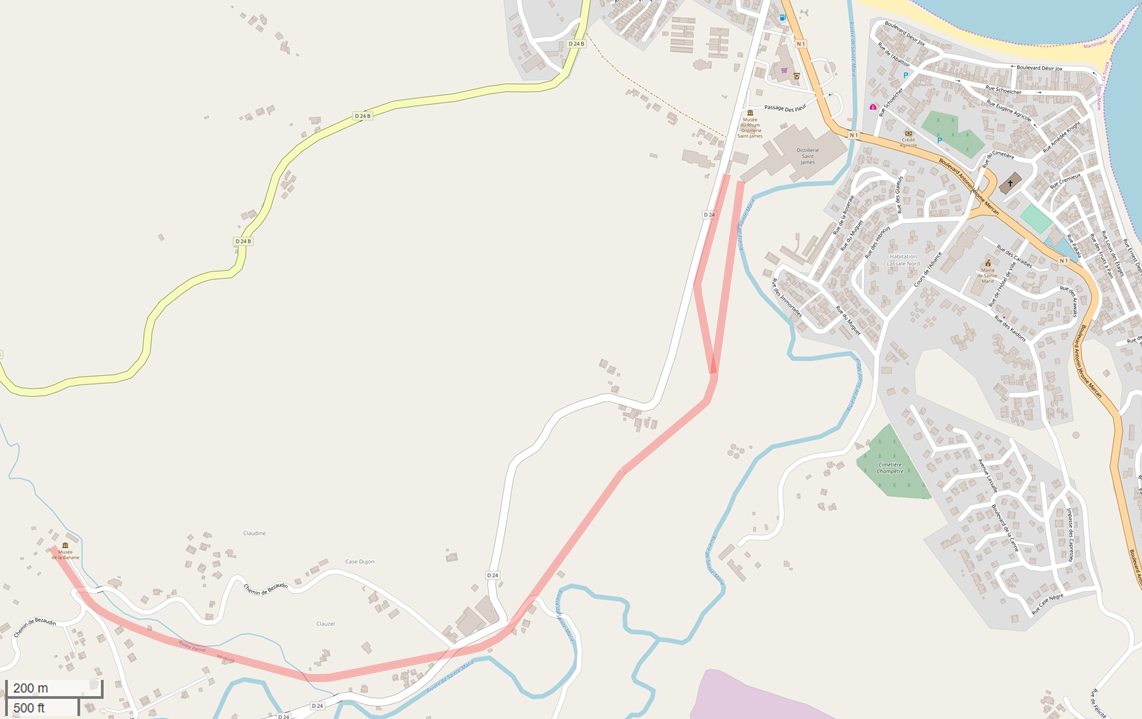

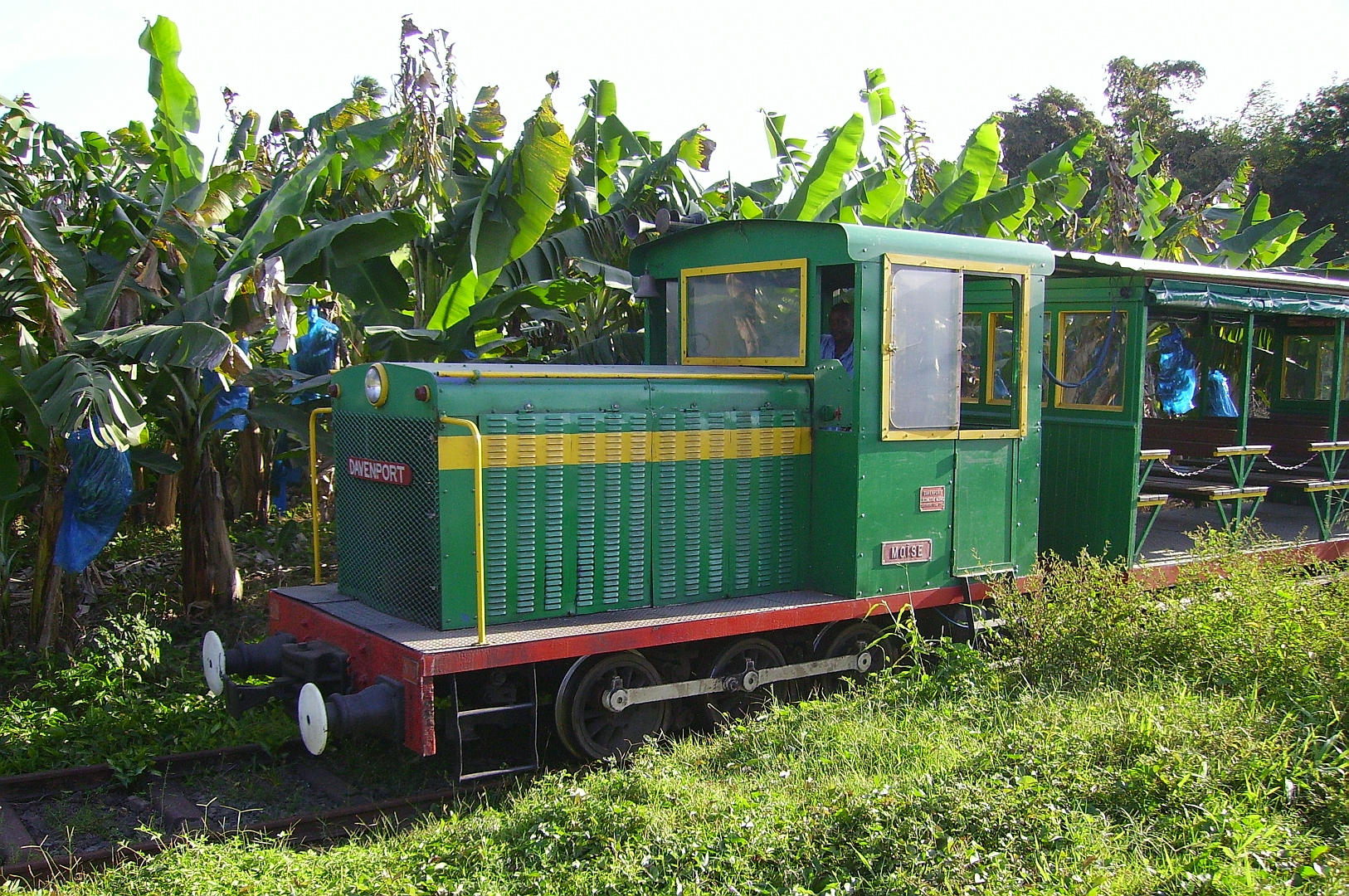
- Heritage train in a banana plantation

Overview
- Native name: Les Rails de la Canne à Sucre

Technical
- Line length: 2.5 kilometres (1.6 mi)
- Track gauge: 3 feet 10 inches (1,168 mm)

Le Train des Plantations of the Les Rails de la Canne à Sucre association is a 2.5 kilometres (1.6 mi) long, privately owned heritage railway with Usine Sainte-Marie's (USM's) original gauge of 3 feet 10 inches (1,168 mm) in Sainte-Marie in Martinique.

== Location ==
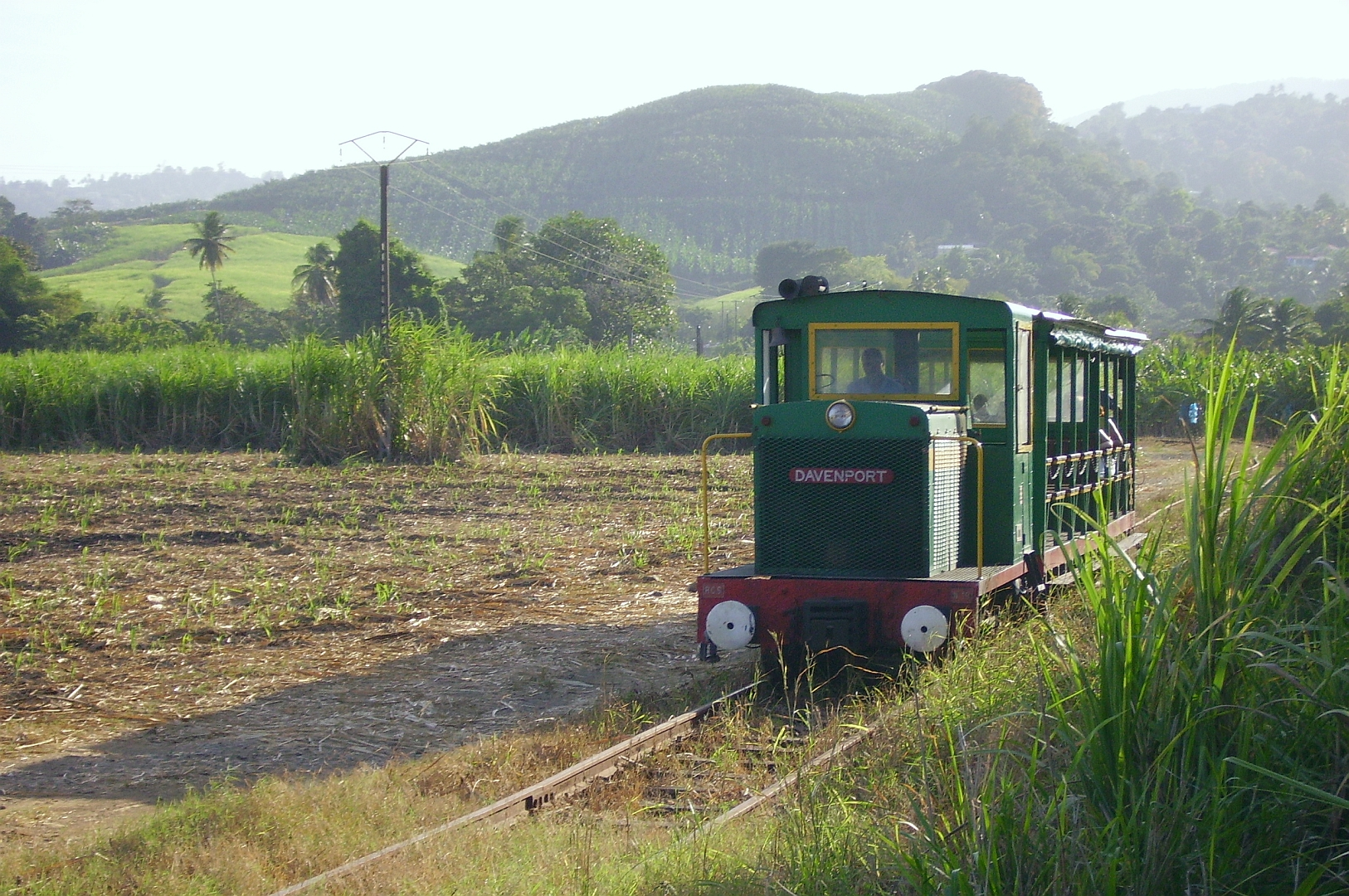
Heritage train in a sugarcane plantation

The narrow gauge train runs from Rhum Museum at the Saint James Distillery in Sainte-Marie through sugarcane and banana plantations over two Bailey bridges to the Banana Museum.

== Operation ==
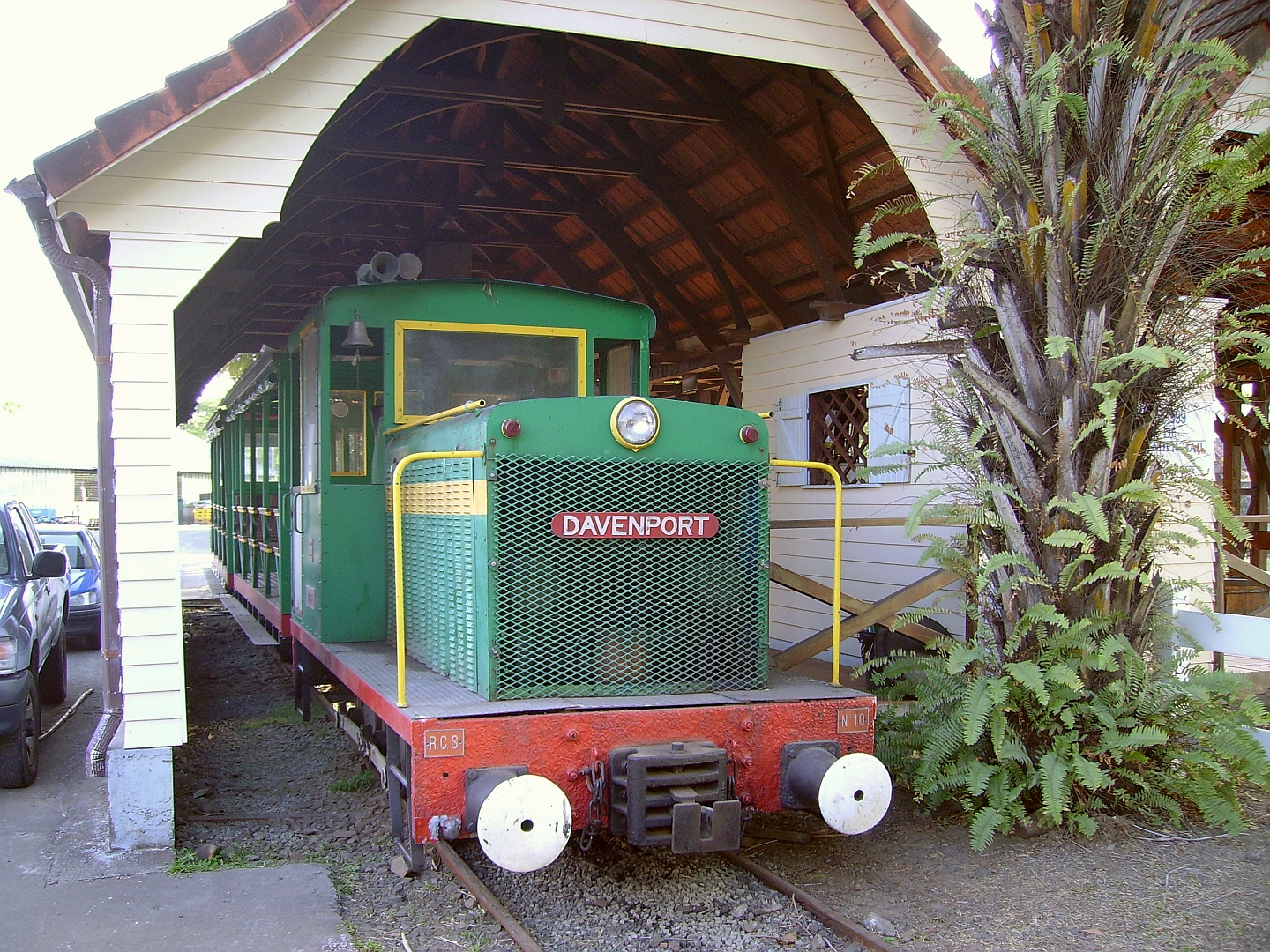
Heritage train at Rum Museum Station

The heritage train is operated by an enthusiastic team of retired employees of RATP, SNCF, Police and Post Office. It runs Tuesday to Saturday from 9:30 to 13:30.

== Locomotives ==
A Davenport diesel locomotive Moïse with a 232 hp Deutz engine was salvaged from the bed of the Cherry River (Rivière Cerise).

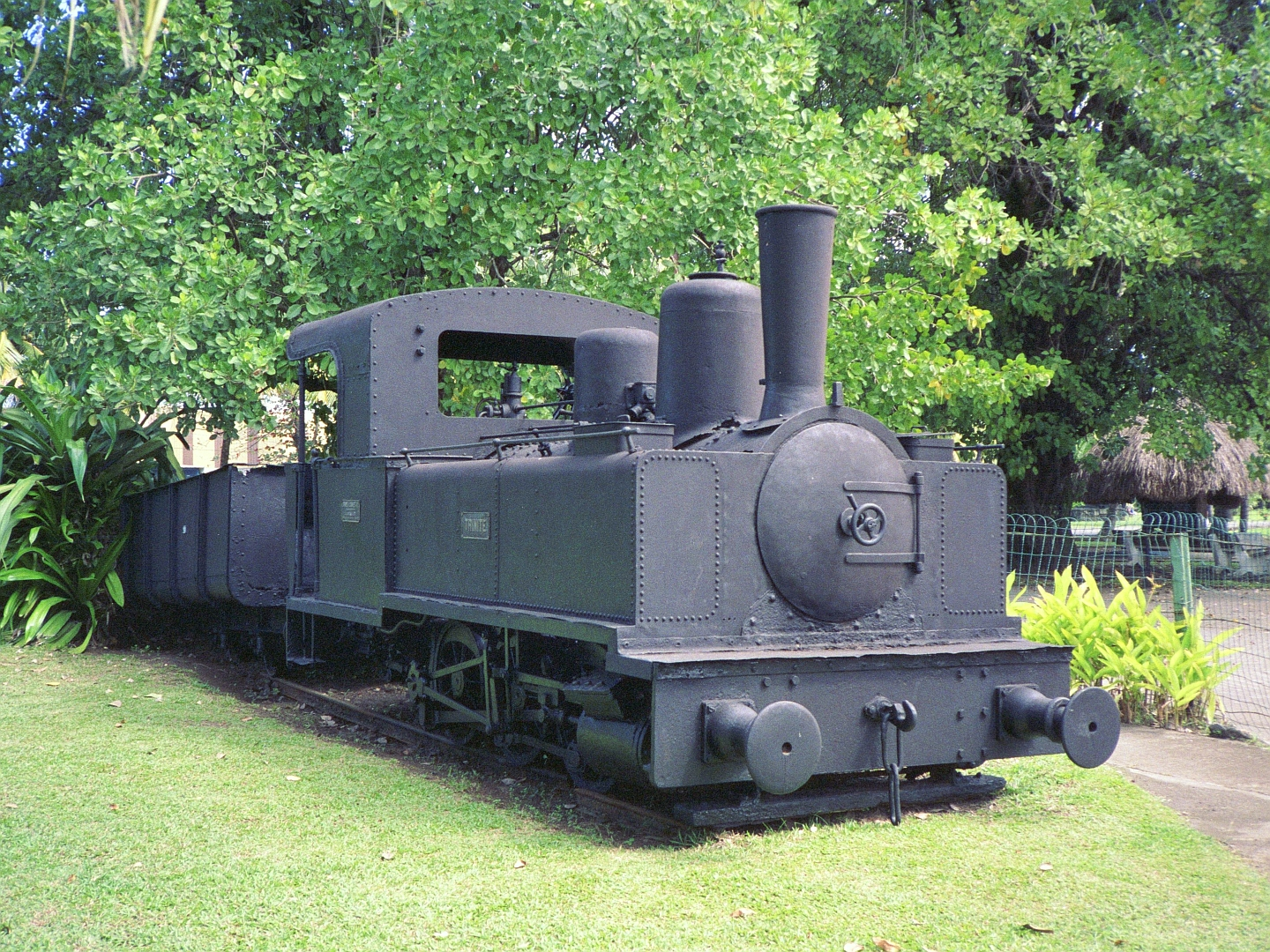
030-T Corpet steam locomotive

A Corpet-Louvet six-wheeler steam locomotive with works No 1701 of 1925 is exhibited in a well preserved but non-functional condition at Saint James station.
