= Route number =

Number to identify or classify a road

A route (or road) number, designation or abbreviation is an identifying numeric (or alphanumeric) designation assigned by a highway authority to a particular stretch of roadway to distinguish it from other routes and, in many cases, also to indicate its classification (e.g. motorway, primary route, regional road, etc.), general geographical location (in zonal numbering systems) and/or orientation (north-south v. east-west). The numbers chosen may be used solely for internal administrative purposes; however, in most cases they are also displayed on roadside signage and indicated on maps.

== Prefixes ==
Letters are often used in road designations to indicate a class of roadways. Within such a class, roads are distinguished from each other by a road number. The way such letters are used depends on the country or other political jurisdiction which contains and controls the road. For instance, among A1 motorways, the one in Spain has a hyphen between the A and the 1 (Autovia A-1) while in Germany the Autobahn 1 is written A 1, with a space between the A and the 1. In Argentina there are zeros between the A and the 1 (Autopista A001).

=== Single-letter abbreviations ===
- "A" may mean "motorway" in a number of countries (ex. Autoroute in France or Autostrada in Italy and Romania, or Autobahn in Germany), usually the largest and highest-quality roadways in the country. Is also used for primary roads in the UK. It also means a road of national significance in Australia and the United Kingdom.
- "B" roads in the United Kingdom are distributor roads which have lower traffic densities than the main trunk roads, or A roads. In certain Australian states, a B road is a road of state significance.
- "C" may mean county in the US and means a connecting route that connects two places in Victoria, Tasmania or the Northern Territory. Means "Circle" or "Circular road" in Japan.
- "D" may mean départementale in France, or dálnice in the Czech Republic (blend of dálková= 'long-distance' and silnice= 'highway' representing motorways exclusively) and analogous diaľnica in Slovakia
- "E" may mean "European" road, or "Expressways" in Japan, Zimbabwe, Malaysia
- "F"
- "G" may be used for a national highway or freeway in China
- "H" may mean "Hawaiian Interstate" in the US
- "I" may mean "Interstate" in the US
- "J"
- "K" may be used for a state highway in Kansas in the US or Kreisstraße in Germany
- "L" may mean "local" route in Ireland or Landesstraße in Germany
- "M" used for motorways in the United Kingdom, Ireland and Australia, metropolitan routes in South Africa, municipal roads in Portugal, and also used for state highways in Michigan in the US
- "N" may mean "national" road or for state highways in Nebraska
- "O" may mean "Otoyol" in Turkey
- "P"
- "Q", such as Corridor Q
- "R" may mean "regional" route in South Africa, Ireland, Portugal and Ukraine or "ring" road, or "rýchlostná cesta" in Slovakia ("rychlost" = velocity)
- "S" may mean expressways in Austria ("Schnellstraße") and Poland ("droga ekspresowa") or "Shengdao/Provincial Highways" in China
- "T" T roads in Malaysia are roads in Terengganu; in some parts of the U.S., they are township roads; In Estonia, T is the official prefix for national routes; "territorial" roads in Ukraine; in Italy T is used for tunnels (traforo) when separately classified, like the Great St Bernard Tunnel
- "U" may mean "unclassified" road; also used in Utah routes in the US
- "V"
- "W"
- "X" may mean "Xiandao/County Highways" in China
- "Y" may mean "Xiangdao/Town Highways" in China
- "Z"

=== Multiple-letter abbreviations ===
- AP: Autopista de peaje (toll motorway) in Spain
- BAB: Bundesautobahn (federal motorway) in Germany, only used in documents, normally just A
- BR: Brazilian Federal Highway
- CH/CR: County Highway, Route or Road in the US or Canada among other countries
- CT: cao tốc (freeway/expressway) in Vietnam
- DC: drum comunal (communal road) in Romania (road administrated by a commune)
- DG: droga gminna (communal road) in Poland
- DJ: drum județean (county road) in Romania
- DK: droga krajowa (national road) in Poland
- DN: drum național (national road) in Romania
- DP: droga powiatowa (county road) in Poland
- DW: droga wojewódzka (voivodeship/provincial road) in Poland
- EO: ethniki odos (national road) in Greece
- FT: Federal Route in Malaysia
- Fv: Fylkesvei (county road) in Norway
- IC: Itinerário complementar (complementary route) in Portugal
- IP: Itinerário principal (principal route) in Portugal
- NH: Is used to designate National Highway network in India. Also used to designate State Highways in the US State of New Hampshire.
- QL: quốc lộ (national road) in Vietnam
- SH/SR: State Highway, Route or Road in New Zealand or the US
- SS/SR/SP/SC: Strada statale, regionale, provinciale or comunale (state, regional, provincial or municipal road in Italy)
- TH/TR: Township Highway, Route or Road in the US
- TL: tỉnh lộ (provincial road) in Vietnam
- US: United States Numbered Highway
- USBR: United States Bicycle Route

=== Roman numeral prefixes ===
- I: first-class roads in the Czech Republic and Slovakia (state roads), first-class roads in Bulgaria
- II: second-class roads in the Czech Republic and Slovakia (regional roads), second-class roads in Bulgaria
- III: third-class roads in the Czech Republic and Slovakia (district roads, owned by regions), third-class roads in Bulgaria

While in the Czech Republic and Slovakia, the Roman numeral is followed by a slash, Bulgaria uses a hyphen.

== By country ==
Depending on the country, the letter attributed to a road may be part of a road grading system, be a shortening for a type of road especially in a foreign language or refer to a geographical zoning system, such as the Appalachian Development Highway System or the county highway systems of California, Iowa, and Michigan in the United States.

=== International systems ===
- AH roads in the Asian Highway Network
- CA-: highways part of the Central American highway network
- E roads in the International E-road network in Europe
- EV: long-distance cycling routes in the EuroVelo network of Europe
- TAH: highways part of the Trans-African Highway network

=== Australia ===
In Australia, road routes are allocated along sections of named roads, often along parts of multiple roads. Unlike many other countries, most highways in Australia tend to be referred to only by their names. State road authorities have separate numbering systems, for internal use only.

Common route number shields used in Australia

Alphanumeric route (used nationally); may also be coloured orange-on-blue for tollways in VIC and QLD.

Alphanumeric route which was previously used in the ACT & NSW before 2020 - progressively being replaced with the national standard. Note the white border.

National Highway (alphanumeric): remains on old signs used in SA, QLD and VIC.

National Highway (numeric): used in WA and partly QLD.

National Route: used in QLD and partly in WA and VIC; remains on old signs in ACT.

State Route: used in QLD, WA and Melbourne (VIC); also known as Metro Routes in Melbourne where it is slowly being phased out with alphanumeric routes.

The first route marking system was introduced to Australia in the 1950s. National Routes were assigned to significant interstate routes – the most important road links in the country. National Route 1 was designated to a circular route around the Australian coastline. A state route marking system was designed to supplement the national system, for inter-regional and urban routes within states. When the National Highway system was introduced, National Routes along it became National Highway routes with the same numbers, but with distinctive green and gold route markers. Alphanumeric routes were introduced in Tasmania in 1979, and during the 1990s, planning began for nationally consistent route markings, using the alphanumeric system. Alphanumeric routes have been introduced in most states and territories in Australia, partially or completely replacing the previous systems.

==== National Routes and Highways ====
In 1955, the Australian National Route Numbering System was introduced to simplify navigation across Australia. The National Route Numbers are marked by white shields that are present in directional signs, distance signs or trailblazers. The general rule was that odd-numbered highways travel in north–south directions and even-numbered highways in east–west directions, with only a few exceptions. National Route 1 was assigned to a network of highways and roads, which together linked all capital cities and coastal towns circumnavigating the mainland. The National Route system initially linked the centres of towns and cities and terminated at the junction of other national routes, however many bypasses have been constructed since then. National Routes often terminated at the metropolitan city limits rather than the individual city centres.

In 1974, the federal government assumed responsibility for funding the nations most important road links, with the introduction of the National Highway. These highways were marked with distinctive green and gold route marker shields instead of the plain National Route shield. Though the National Highway system has been superseded in subsequent legislation, National Highway route markers are still used on many of the routes. Additionally, National Highways and National Routes have been phased out, or are in the process of being phased out, in all states and territories except Western Australia, in favour of the alphanumeric system.

==== State Routes ====
Important urban and inter-regional routes not covered by the National Highway or National Route systems are marked under the State Route system. They can be recognised by blue shield markers. They were practically adopted in all states by the end of the 1980s, and in some states, some less important National Routes were downgraded to State Routes. Each state has or had its own numbering scheme, but with the exception of QLD, do not duplicate State Route numbers in the same state, or nearby routes in another state. As with the National Routes and National Highways, State Routes are being phased out in most states and territories in favour of alphanumeric routes. However, despite the fact that Victoria has fully adopted alphanumeric routes in regional areas, state route numbers are still used extensively within the city of Melbourne as a part of its Metropolitan Route Numbering Scheme.

==== Metroads ====
Metroad route marker

In the 1990s in Sydney and Brisbane, urban route numbering system were streamlined under the Metroad scheme. Metroad route numbers were assigned to the key navigational corridors, along ring and radial routes, and marked by distinctive hexagonal shields. Most Metroads were replaced by alphanumeric route numbers in the mid 2010s; to such an extent that only Metroads 2 and 5 still exist in Brisbane, and none remain in Sydney. However, remnant signage still exists along the old routes.

==== Alphanumeric routes ====
Tasmania introduced an alphanumeric route numbering system in 1979, based on the British system from 1963. The new system aimed to upgrade the signing of destinations, including previously unmarked roads, and to simplify navigation by allowing visitors to follow numbered routes. National Highway 1 was retained as the only route without an alphanumeric designation. In the 1990s Victoria and South Australia also overhauled their systems. While South Australia discarded the National and State Route Numbering Systems, those shield-based schemes were retained in the Melbourne metropolitan area as the Metropolitan Route Numbering Scheme. The route numbers used in the alphanumeric schemes were generally inherited from the original National Route Numbering System, with only a few exceptions, and prefixed with letters denoting their grade. For example, Western Freeway is M8 until Ballarat and continues beyond as A8 Western Highway. They are not used extensively in the Melbourne metropolitan area where the blue-shield metropolitan route system is retained for most routes. (They were phased out for motorways in the early 2010s. New alphanumeric numbers are appearing for other new roads, and cover plates for signs, possibly pointing to a future phase-out of the metropolitan route system altogether.) The National Highways were retained, but with the route numbers changed to alphanumeric designations (later to be passively phased out since 2014).

New South Wales and the Australian Capital Territory (Note: The only numbered roads in the Australian Capital Territory are interstate highways from NSW and their interconnecting thoroughfares, as the Australian Capital Territory does not number its other highway or freeway grade roads.) introduced the alphanumeric system from early 2013. Before being officially announced, new road signs were fitted with such numbers and then being "coverplated" with the existing route number. However, the new system does not distinguish between the former National Highways and other routes.

Alphanumeric routes have also been introduced for many major highways and urban routes in Queensland, although many other roads retain markers from the National Route, National Highway, State and Metroad numbering systems. According to the New South Wales Roads & Maritime Services, the Northern Territory has similarly begun converting their numbered routes to alphanumeric routes, with a "progressive replacement" scheme that sees alphanumeric route markers introduced only when signs are replaced. There are no plans to introduce an alphanumeric route numbering system in Western Australia.

===== Prefix letters =====
In the alphanumeric systems, a letter denoting the route's construction standard and function is prefixed to the route number, creating an alphanumeric route designation. Normally, one of four letters may be used:

- "M" routes are primary traffic routes, called motorways in some states. These are typically dual carriageway, freeway-standard highways, but may also be used for rural roads that are nearly at freeway-standard, or at least are dual carriageways.
- "A" routes are other primary highways, including urban arterials and interstate or interregional single carriageways.
- "B" routes are less significant routes, either as an alternative to an "A" or "M" route, or linking smaller population centres to larger regional centres, but without being a major through-route in the region. These are the major road links in areas without "A" routes.
- "C" routes link smaller settlements and towns to the rest of the major road network. They are used for roads without the significance of an "M", "A", or "B" route, but where numbering would assist navigation. C roads are signed in Tasmania, Victoria and the Northern Territory. (Note: A small number of C routes in western Victoria are extended by South Australia to the next major road, however South Australia does not sign C routes of its own.)

A single route number may have multiple prefixes if its standard and/or importance changes along its length.

In 2017, the state of South Australia introduced a unique "R" prefixed route, R1, for the inner City Ring Route in Adelaide.

Various prefixes (such as "D" or "DR") are also used for numbered, permanently signed detour routes in some states.

=== Bulgaria ===
Bulgaria uses prefix A for highways A1–A7 and Roman numerals I, II, III (followed by a hyphen) for the first-, second- and third-class roads. First-class numbers are single-digit, second-class road numbers are double-digit, third-class road numbers are three-digit or four-digit.

=== Canada ===
The Trans-Canada Highway system is made up of a series of provincially maintained highways, and is one of only two systems (the other being the Crowsnest Highway) that uses route numbering that spans multiple provinces, albeit not across the entire country. The provincial highways are assigned numbers by their respective provinces.

==== Alberta ====
All provincial highways are 'Primary Highways'. They are divided into two series', and sub-series'.

- 1-216 Series — core highway network
  - Hwy 1-100 — intercity
  - Hwy 201, 216 — orbital routes
- 500-986 Series — local highways
  - Hwy 500-699 — west–east routes
  - Hwy 700-899 — south–north routes
  - 900 and X series — potential realignments and extensions

==== British Columbia ====
Owing to the mountainous terrain in the province, route numbers are assigned on a mostly ad hoc basis, and vary between west–east and south–north routes. They currently span from 1-118, except for Hwy 395 which is a counterpart of US 395. Some routes are grouped in numerical patterns (e.g. Highways 9, 11, 13, 15, 17, and 19 are north–south routes with values increasing by increments of two moving West). British Columbia formerly had "400 series" of highways similar to Ontario, but that scheme was dropped in 1973.

==== Manitoba ====
Provincial Trunk Highways (PTH) are divided into two series'.

- PTH 1-199 — primary highways
  - PTH 1-89 — intercity
  - PTH 100, 101, 110 — loop routes
- PR 200-699 — secondary highways

==== New Brunswick ====
Provincial highways are divided into three series'.

- Route 1-99 — arterial highways
- Route 100-199 — collector highways
- Route 200-999 — local highways

==== Newfoundland and Labrador ====
Provincial highways are divided into three series'.

- Main highways have varying numbers
- Regional roads are numbered by region
  - Route 2-203 — Avalon Peninsula
  - Route 204-205, 230-239 — Bonavista Peninsula
  - Route 210-222 — Burin Peninsula
  - Route 301-346 — Kittiwake Coast, Fogo Island, & Twillingate
  - Route 350-371 — Exploits River Valley & Bay d'Espoir
  - Route 380-392, 410-419 — Baie Verte
  - Route 401, 420-438 — Great Northern Peninsula
  - Route 402-407, 440-490 — Western Newfoundland
  - Route 500-520 — Labrador
- Local highways are based on intersecting primary routes and numbered with extension (i.e. 210-1)

==== Nova Scotia ====
Provincial highways are divided into five series'.

- 100-Series — arterial highways
- Trunk Highways
- Route 200-399 — collector highways
- Scenic Routes are unnumbered
- Local roads are unnumbered

==== Ontario ====
Provincial highways are divided into four classes.

- Hwy 2-148, 400-427 — King's (primary) highways
  - Hwy 2-148 — intercity
  - 400-series highways (freeways)
- Hwy 500-699 — secondary highways
- Hwy 800-813 — tertiary highways
- 7000-series — resource & industrial roads

==== Prince Edward Island ====
Provincial highways are divided into three series'.

- Route 1-4 — primary highways
- Route 4-27 — secondary highways
- Local highways are numbered by county
  - Route 101-199 — Prince County
  - Route 201-299 — Queens County
  - Route 301-399 — Kings County

==== Quebec ====
Provincial highways are divided into three classes. Odd numbers generally refer to routes that run north-south. Even numbers generally refer to routes that run east-west.

- Autoroutes - expressways
  - Route numbers for bypasses and spurs take on a prefix (4nn-9nn)
- 100-series — primary highways
- Secondary routes
  - 200-series — south of the Saint Lawrence River
  - 300-series — north of the Saint Lawrence River

==== Saskatchewan ====
Provincial highways are divided into three series', and sub-series'.

- Hwy 1-99 — primary highways
- Hwy 100-399 — secondary highways which are spurs of primary highways
  - Hwy 102-167 — northern routes
  - Hwy 201-271 — routes to recreational areas
  - Hwy 301-397 — routes to minor communities
- Hwy 600-799, 900-999 — minor highways
  - Hwy 600-699 — south–north highways
  - Hwy 700-799 — west–east highways
  - Hwy 900-999 — northern or isolated roads

==== Northwest Territories ====
There are currently eleven territorial highways in the Northwest Territories. All eleven are named, eight are numbered 1-8, and two are winter roads.

==== Nunavut ====
There are a number of roads and highways in Nunavut, none are yet numbered.

==== Yukon ====
There are currently fourteen territorial highways in Yukon. All fourteen are named and numbered 1-11, 14-15, & 37.

=== China ===
==== Expressways ====
China National Expressway Network

National expressways of China are designated with letter G (for 国家高速, guójiā gāosù) followed by 1, 2, or 4 digits. For national expressways, one-digit numbers are used for expressways starting in Beijing. Two-digit odd numbers from G11 to G89 are for north–south long-distance expressways, and even numbers from G10 to G90 are for east–west long-distance expressways. Numbers G91 – G99 denote regional ring routes. Four-digit numbers indicate city ring routes, spur routes and parallel routes. The first two numbers indicates their parent routes, while for the three types of routes, the third digit is 0, an odd number, or an even number, respectively. Provincial city ring routes, spur routes uses two digits. For example, in G1503 (Shanghai Ring Expressway), "15" refers to the G15 Shenyang–Haikou Expressway, which passes through Shanghai, and "0" indicates that the route is a city ring expressway.

Provincial expressways are designated with letter S (for 省高速, shěng gāosù) followed by 1 or 2 digits. Similar to the national expressways, one-digit numbers are used for routes starting in the provincial capital. Since 2017, the Chinese route naming standard no longer designates provincial expressways with 4 digit numbers.

==== Non-expressways ====
- G, followed by 3 digits, stand for guódào (国道), or China National Highways. S routes stand for shěngdào (省道), or provincial roads.
  - Roads 101 – 199 radiates from Beijing (G roads) or the provincial capital (S roads).
  - Roads 201 – 299 are north–south highways.
  - Roads 301 – 399 are east–west highways.
  - Roads 501 – 599 are spur routes.
- County roads (xiàndào, 县道) are prefixed with letter X. Township roads (xiāngdào, 乡道) are prefixed with letter Y. Village roads (cūndào, 村道) are prefixed with letter C. Special roads (zhuānyòng dàolù, 专用道路) are prefixed with letter Z.

=== Czech Republic and Slovakia ===
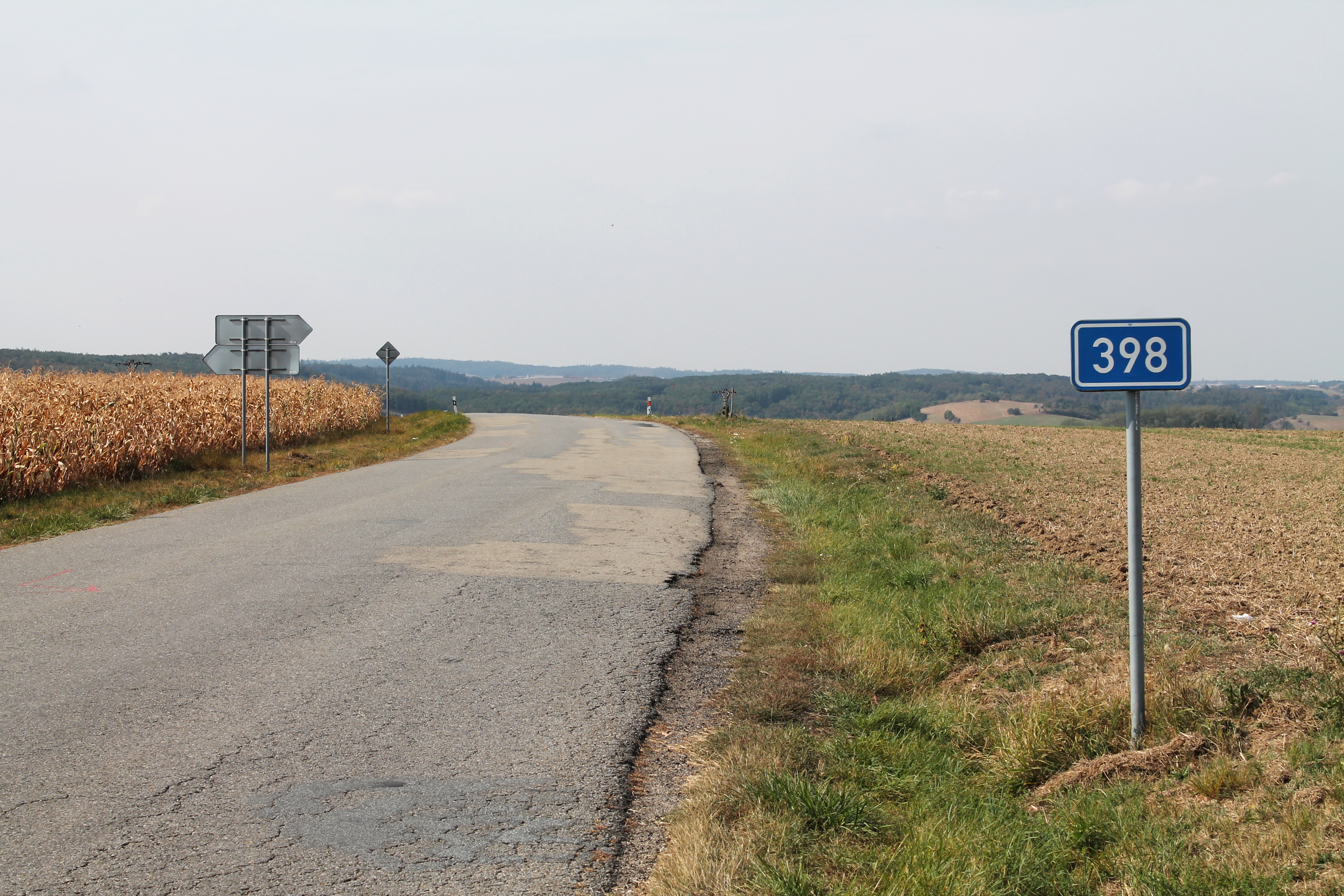
Sign of a second-class highway II/398 in the Czech Republic

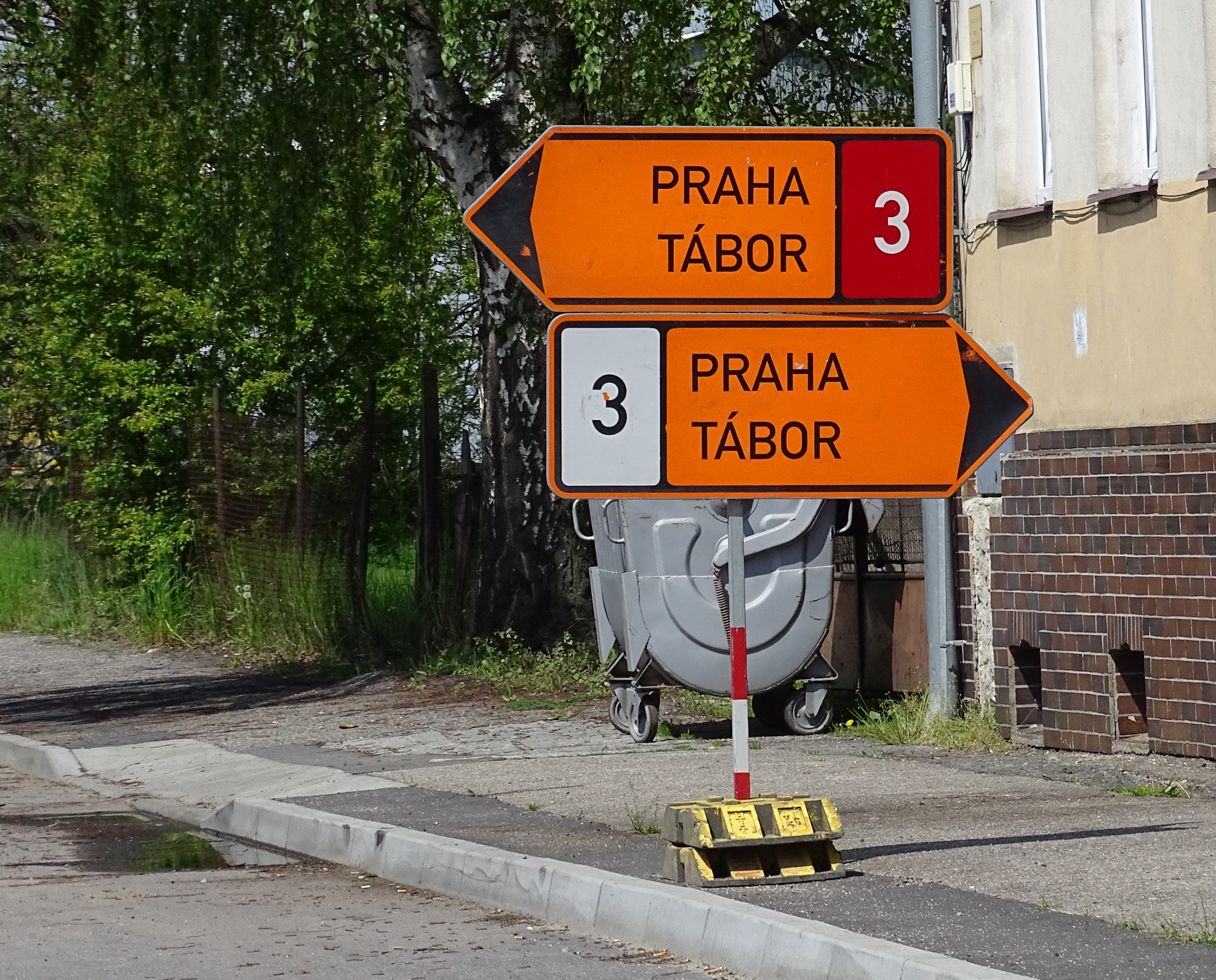
Motorway D3 is different from the highway I/3

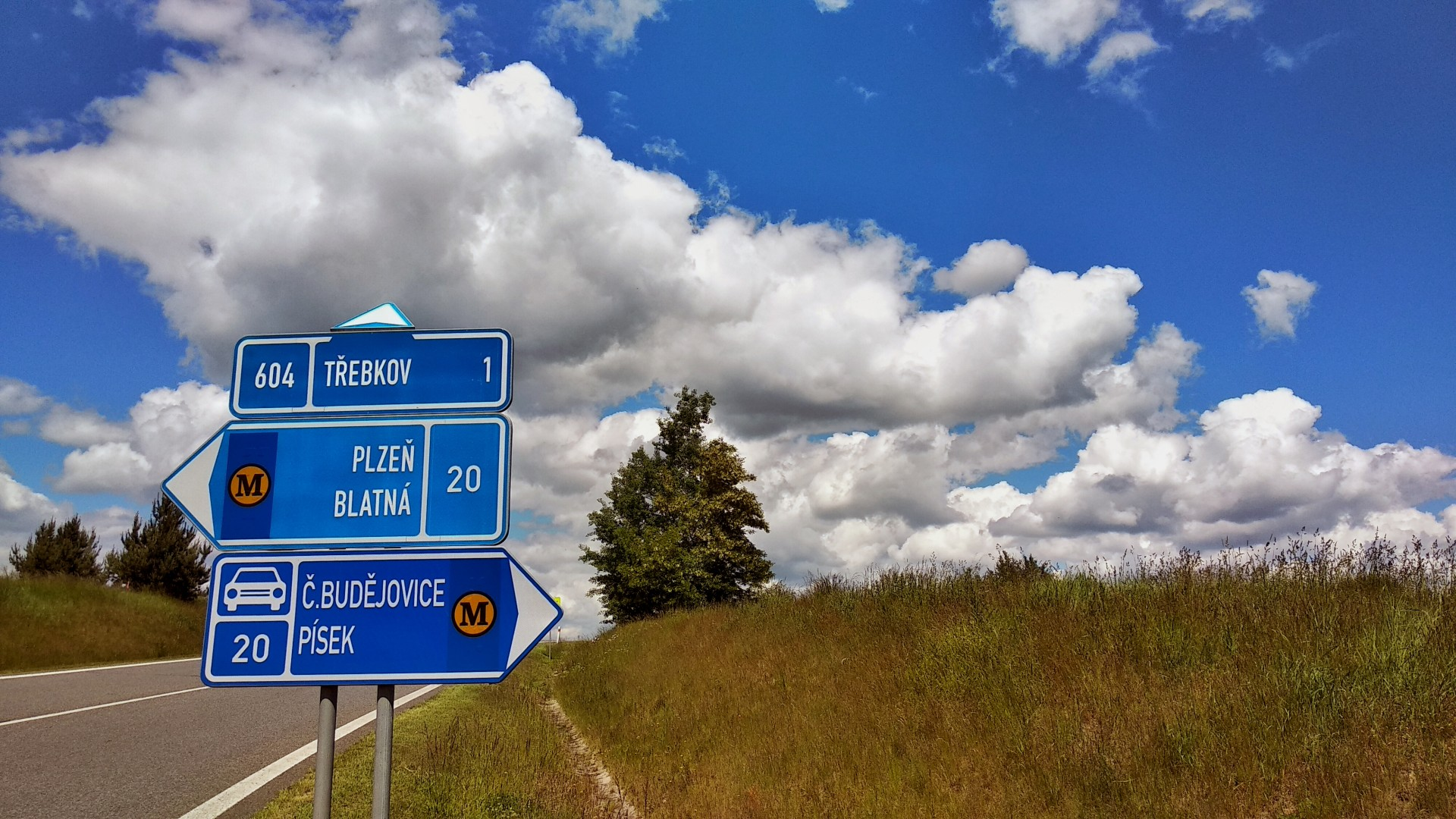
Route numbers on directional road signs

The numbering system of motorway and highway routes in the Czech Republic and Slovakia is based on the original Czechoslovak system. Around 1946, first-class highways got their numbers 1–68. Numbers 1–60 belonged to Czech roads, 61–68 to Slovak roads. In 1950, an ordinance was issued (1199/1949 Ú.l.I) that divided highways into three classes, traditionally denoted by Roman numerals I (state roads), II (regional roads), III (district roads). The system of numbering highways of all classes was state-wide. Each route number was unique and one highway could pass through several regions or districts under one number. Municipal highways were not included in the uniform numbering system.

The number of digits of the route number corresponded to the highway class. Class I highways had 1 or 2 digits, class II highways 3 digits, class III 4 or 5, exceptionally 6 digits. On directional road signs, identification plates of bridge objects or in maps, the highway number is given without a prefix. In texts, official decisions and announcements, the highway number is usually preceded by a class designation with a slash (I/67, II/102, III/00425). At class I or II, the highway branch can be supplemented with a letter suffix (capital letter), e.g. 8H can be a branch of highway 8, or 102A can be a branch of highway 102. However, this index is not shown on regular maps or road signs. If the suffix letter (lowercase letter) is used for III-class highway (III/10107a), the highway marked in this way is a separate highway and the letter suffix is an integral part of the highway number.

Highway numbers of I and II classes are sequential, meaningless. Some patterns can be traced to how the numbers were originally assigned by direction and area, but newly assigned or changed numbers may not follow these patterns. Numbers of III-class highway are always derived from the number of some I-class or II-class highway. The first three digits always indicate a reference highway of a higher class, which means that I-class numbers are always supplemented by leading zeros to the three-digit number (III/0041 and III/00425a are both derived from I/4, and the number III/3259 is followed by III/32510). When I-class or II-class highways are renumbered or recategorized, III-class highway numbers do not usually change because of this, i.e. they can refer to historical numbering, not to the current one.

Although plans and attempts to build motorways in the area of Czechoslovakia had been made in the past, the first section of the modern motorway network was opened on 12 July 1971. Motorway numbers are mostly derived from I-class highways, which they replaced, e.g. highway I/5 was replaced by motorway D5. Motorway numbers are usually indicated with the prefix D (D1, D47), in directional traffic signs they are indicated without a prefix and are distinguished only by the red colour of the background. However, the motorway number should not be confused with the corresponding I-class highway number, for example, the D8 motorway goes in a different direction than the I/8 highway. The prefix D is derived from the word "dálnice", which is a blend of "long-distance highway", the substantive "dálka" means "a (long) distance".

Markings with the R prefix for "expressways" (rychlostní silnice, the word "rychlost" means "a velocity") were also used in the road network maps and strategic documents. R-highways did not have a separate numbering system, but they were sections of ordinary I-class highways, but in construction parameters and with a traffic regime similar to motorways.

After the dissolution of Czechoslovakia, the numbering systems of the two successor states (Czech Republic and Slovakia) became independent, but both continued to follow the Czechoslovak numbering system.

The numbering system in the Czech Republic remained in principle unchanged. However, especially during the partial changes in 1997, some numbers that originally belonged to Slovakia, especially from the 60s series, were used for I-class highways in the Czech Republic, so they are now used concurrently with the same numbers in Slovakia. The motorways were renumbered so that the Slovak D1 motorway is no longer planned to connect to the Czech D1 motorway. Slovakia also started to use numbers for its highways that were originally used in the Czech Republic. In Slovakia, a separate numbering system for expressways (R-roads) was created, with numbers R1 – R8.

As of 1 January 2016, the motorway network was reformed in the Czech Republic. The main change was that most sections of R-highways (expressways) were recategorized to motorways and the R prefix has fallen into disuse for the remaining ones.

In Slovakia, numbering of III-class highways underwent two reforms. First, in connection with the digitization of the road database, the way of writing third-class highway numbers was changed so that in the data outputs all these numbers were complemented to six digits by inserting zeros, e.g. III/5196 to III/519006, however, the old numbering was also used at the same time. As of 1 May 2015, all Slovak III-class highways were renumbered to completely new four-digit numbers, while an interval is reserved for individual districts within which the numbers are assigned. E.g., III/063054 (referring to I/63) was renumbered to III/1460 (numbers starting with 145, 146, 147 belong to Komárno District).

In the Czech Republic, there is also a national system of cycle route numbering. It is independent of highway numbering. Number of digits (1–4) corresponds to the route class, i.e. one-digit numbers are for I-class long-distance routes, while 4-digits numbers for local IV-class routes. On the roads, cycling routes are marked with yellow-black directional road signs, and for local and off-road routes, stripe marks derived from Czech Hiking Markers System are used (with yellow margin stripes instead of white ones). The guarantor of the numbering system is Czech Tourist Club. In addition, there are many local routes not included in this system.

=== Finland ===
The classification and numbering system of state-maintained roads of Finland is as follows:

- Main roads Class I (Finnish: valtatiet; Swedish: riksvägar): 1–39 (between major cities)
- Main roads Class II (Finnish: kantatiet; Swedish: stamvägar): 40–99 (between regional centers)
- Regional roads (Finnish: seututiet; Swedish: regionalvägar): 100–999 (between large municipalities or alternate routes)
- Connecting roads (Finnish: yhdystiet; Swedish: förbindelsevägar): 1000–9999 (connecting to a larger road)
- Local roads (Finnish: paikallistiet; Swedish: bygdevägar): 11000–19999 (between villages cf. farm-to-market road)

Streets are maintained by the local municipality. Winter maintenance of roads and streets is managed by a local authority. Regional roads and connecting roads cf. county highways and roads. Main roads cf. Interstates or U.S. routes.

All main roads and almost all regional roads are paved. They are generally wider than 7 metres (23 ft). About half of the connecting and local roads are paved. They are generally narrower, and oncoming traffic is a potential hazard, despite the general speed limit of 80 kilometres per hour (50 mph). Connecting and local roads are usually not marked with numbers, but just with ordinary traffic signs.

==== Highways ====
The main highways are all paved and have at least two lanes; they are better maintained than main and regional roads. Highways numbered from 1 to 7 radiate from the capital Helsinki (Highways 2, 5 and 6 diverge from 1, 4 and 7, respectively), while highways 8 to 10 radiate from Turku on the south-western coast of Finland. Highways 11 and 12 originate in Tampere. The rest of the highways start from other major cities.

Sections of highway between major cities have often been upgraded to motorways, for example between Helsinki and Tampere. Since Finland is a large and sparsely populated country, there is no need to upgrade all highways to motorways.

=== Germany ===
A stands for Autobahn (motorway), B for Bundesstraße (literally "federal road"). There are also L roads (Landesstraße for Bundesland; in Saxony S and Bavaria St for Staatsstraße), K roads (Kreisstraße for districts, in some states of Germany K roads are classified as Landesstraßen 2. Ordnung and also carry an L number).

Formerly, B roads were also designated as F for Fernstraße (long-distance road) in East Germany until 1990 and as R for Reichsstraße (imperial road) in the Weimar republic and Nazi-Germany until the Second World War.

A roads use white numbers on blue shields, B and R roads black numbers on yellow shields and L, K and St roads – if designated – black numbers on white shields. The respective letters are normally not included in the shield.

Shield for Bundesautobahn 7, short A 7

Shield for Bundesstraße 14, B 14

Shield for former Reichsstraße 128 in former East Prussia, abbreviated as R 128

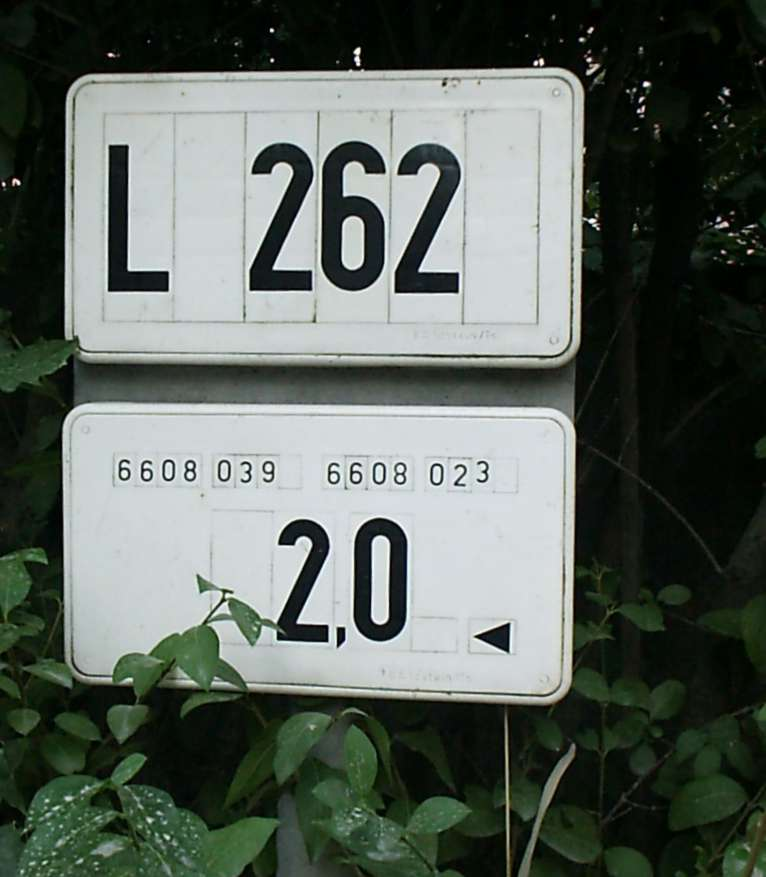
Road marker for Landesstraße 262 in the Saarland, abbreviated as L 262

==== Autobahns ====
In Germany, the normal route number for the German autobahns consists of the letter A and a number:

- 1-digit-numbers are the most important autobahns;
- 2- and 3-digit numbers are for connectors of 1-digit-number-autobahns; and
- north–south routes have odd numbers, and east–west routes have even numbers.

==== Bundesstraßen ====
Bundesstraßen are national highways, their numbers consist of the letter B and a number:

- 1-digit numbers are more important than 2- or 3-digit numbers;
- the first ten roads span the entire country, the 2-digit roads were assigned sequentially in clusters connecting the major regions, and the 3-digit roads are usually shorter connector roads.
- short branches of Bundesstraßen are sometimes signed with the letter "a" (e.g. B 27a); and
- rerouted Bundesstraßen may be given numbers with an appended "n" (e.g. B 7n).

West Berlin once had its own Bundesstraßen with letters.

==== State roads ====
State roads are roads operated by the German federal states. They are called Landesstrasse or Staatsstrasse (in Saxony and Bavaria). They are labeled by an initial L or S and a one- to four-digit individual number (e.g. S2 or L240). The federal states sustain their own numbering systems with individual styles of number shields used.

==== Gallery ====
A 1

A 66

A 100

B 35

B 28a

B 71n

E from West Berlin

R from West Berlin

S from West Berlin

Z from West Berlin

=== Hong Kong ===
- Highways or Routes are numbered 1-10.
- Routes are also given names (e.g. Tolo Highway)

=== Indonesia ===
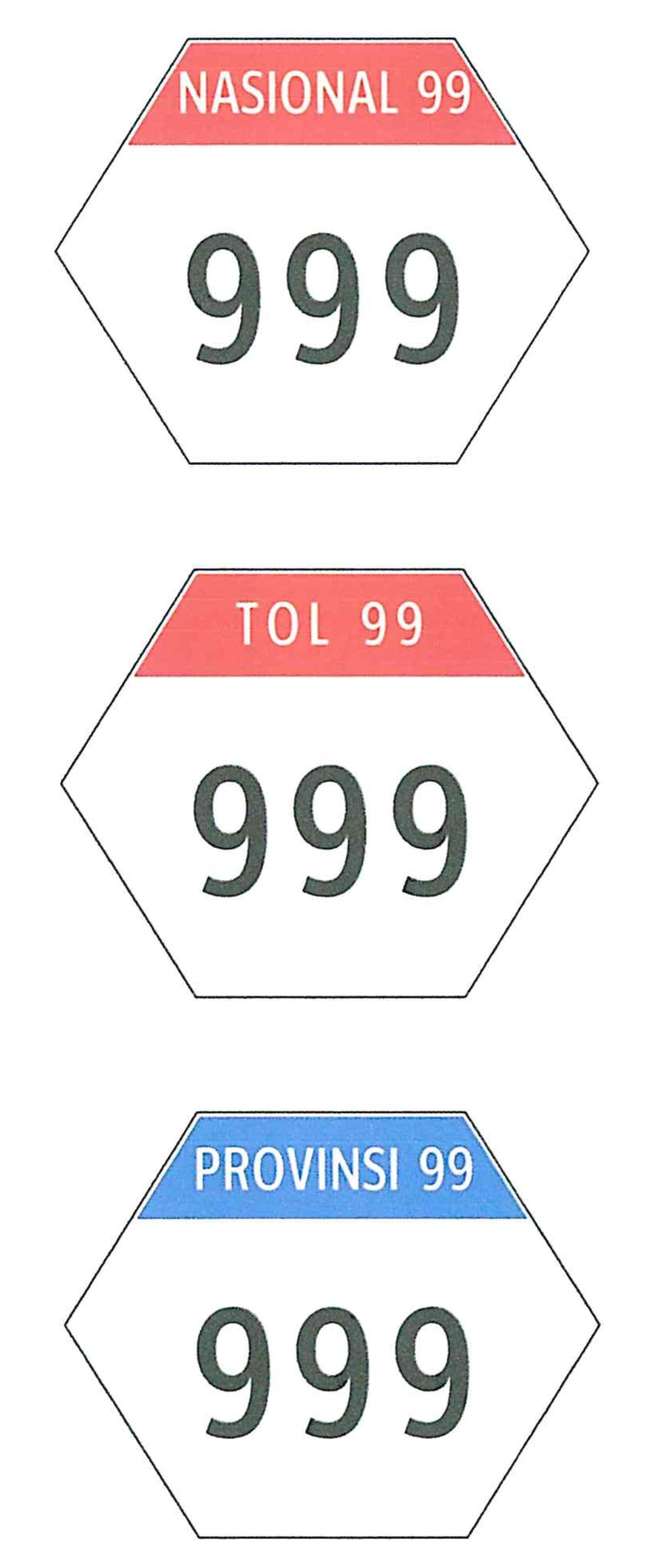
Examples of road signs of Indonesia National Route based on "Peraturan Dirjen Hubdat Kemenhub 2019"; a National Road, a Toll Road, and a Provincial Road

Indonesia is an archipelago. For national route numbering, every main island has its own number. For both national routes and toll roads, numbering starts at 1 on every main island and continues to the small surrounding islands.

- National Route Sign Number: on the top of route number has combination letter "NASIONAL" with background color red, followed by region code each province and number route written on the bottom.
- Toll Road Sign Number: on the top of route number has combination letter "TOL" with background color red, followed by region code each province and number route written on the bottom.
- Provincial Route Sign Number: on the top of route number has combination letter "PROVINSI" with background color blue, followed by region code each regency or city and number route written on the bottom.
Common route number shields used in Indonesia

National route 6 in Region 17 (Bali)

National route 17 in Region 14 (Central Java)

Toll route 1 in Region 12 (West Java) Jakarta–Cikampek Elevated Toll Road

Toll route 2 in Region 2 (North Sumatra)

The numbering is considered by these provision:

- The road sections that parallel to the coastline are given an odd number start from 1 (one) in every main island.
- The next numbering starts from left-right then top-down until the roads on the island have been mapped.
- The road sections that cross the island are numbered even, starting with the number 2 (two).
- Especially for Sulawesi Island, route numbering starts from the bottom of the island to the top of the island.

Until 2019, Ministry of Transportation (Indonesia) has set 31 national routes on Java Island, 55 national routes on Sumatra Island, and 6 national routea on Bali Island. For toll road numbering, the ministry also has set 11 number routes on Java Island, 5 number routes on Sumatra Island, and 1 number route on Bali Island.

=== Italy ===
A stands for autostrada ("motorway"), SS for strada statale ("state highway"), SR for strada regionale ("regional road"), SP for strada provinciale ("provincial road") and SC for strada comunale ("municipal road").

==== Autostrade ====
Road marker for motorways in Italy

Autostrade of Italy follow a single numbering, even if managed by different concessionaire companies: they are all marked with the letter "A" ("RA" in the case of motorway junctions, with the exception of the Bereguardo-Pavia junction numbered on the signs as Autostrada A53, and "T" for the international Alpine tunnels) followed by a number. Therefore, a motorway with the same numbering can be managed by different concessionaire companies (for example the Autostrada A23 is managed for a stretch by Società Autostrade Alto Adriatico and for the remaining stretch by Autostrade per l'Italia). In road signs the alphanumeric acronym is enclosed (not in the case of the 16 junctions) in a green octagon with a white acronym. The numbers of motorways and tunnels are assigned with a circular from the Minister of Infrastructure and Transport to be published in the Gazzetta Ufficiale.

==== Strade statali ====
Road marker for state highways in Italy

Strade statali are identified by a number and a name. In road signs and maps the number is preceded by the acronym SS, an acronym for strada statale ("state road"). The nomenclature of the state highways managed by ANAS generally follows the SS n scheme, where n is a number ranging from 1 (Aurelia) up to 700 (of the Royal Palace of Caserta) depending on the date of establishment of the state highway. Newly built ANAS roads, not yet classified, are identified by the acronym NSA, an acronym for nuova strada ANAS ("new ANAS road"). In road signs the alphanumeric acronym is enclosed in a blue rectangle with a white acronym.

==== Strade regionali, strade provinciali and strade comunali ====
Strade regionali are identified by a number. In road signs and maps the number is preceded by the acronym SR, an acronym for strada regionale ("regional road"). In road signs the alphanumeric acronym is enclosed in a blue rectangle with a white acronym.

Strade provinciali are identified by a number. In road signs and maps the number is preceded by the acronym SP, an acronym for strada provinciale ("provincial road"). In road signs the alphanumeric acronym is enclosed in a blue rectangle with a white acronym.

Extra-urban strade comunali may be identified by a number. In road signs and maps the number is preceded by the acronym SC, an acronym for strada comunale ("municipal road"). In road signs the alphanumeric acronym is enclosed in a white rectangle with a black acronym. Very rarely extra-urban strade comunali are marked with a number and with the abbreviation SC.

Road marker for regional roads in Italy

Road marker for provincial roads in Italy

Road marker for extra-urban municipal roads in Italy

=== Malaysia ===
Route numbering in Malaysia is fairly simple.

==== West ====
- All expressways (classified as an expressway by the Malaysian government) has a route number beginning with 'E', followed by a number. (e.g. North–South Expressway Northern Route and New Klang Valley Expressway)
- All federal roads can have any route number except those stated below. (e.g. FT 1 Malaysia Federal Route 1)
- Industrial roads has a four-digit route number beginning with '3'.
- Roads build by the Federal Land Development Authority has a four-digit route number starting with '1' or '2'.
- Institutional facilities roads follow the normal numbering of federal roads.
- All state roads begins with a letter other than 'E', followed by a number.

Starting Letter	State
A	Perak
B	Selangor
C	Pahang
D	Kelantan
J	Johor
K	Kedah
M	Melaka
N	Negeri Sembilan
P	Penang
R	Perlis
T	Terengganu

==== East ====
===== Sabah =====
- All major roads in Sabah are federal roads. The route numbers are usually three-digits beginning with '5'.
- Route 1, 13 and 22 belong to the Pan Borneo Highway.
- Institutional roads route numbers have three-digits beginning with '6'.
- State roads normally begins with the letter 'SA', but some roads such as the Sapi-Nangoh Highway starts with the letter 'R'. Papar Spur-Pengalat-Lok Kawi Road and Beluran Road begin with the letter 'A' which is derived from the old route numbering scheme, though both of them are state roads.

===== Sarawak =====
- Federal roads in Sarawak are divided into sections. They have a main route number of '1', referring to the whole stretch of the route (i.e. FT 1 Pan Borneo Highway), followed by a dash (-) and the section number. (e.g. FT 1-13 FT 1-14 FT 1-15 FT 1-16 Jalan Kuching-Serian)
- Other roads can have any route number and are also divided into sections.
- All state roads begin with the letter 'Q' followed by a number. Like federal roads, state roads may also be divided into sections.

===== Labuan =====
- All federal roads in Labuan have a three-digit number beginning with '7'.
Common route number shields used in Malaysia

Expressway 1 North–South Expressway Northern Route and New Klang Valley Expressway

Federal Route 1 in Peninsular Malaysia

Federal Route 1 13th Section in Sarawak

Federal Route 3209 in Selangor (industrial federal road)

Service road route code shield

State Route K1 in Kedah

=== Singapore ===
Unlike in neighbouring Malaysia, Singapore does not use a route numbering system. Instead, expressways in Singapore are assigned a three letter code, such as ECP for East Coast Parkway.

=== United Kingdom ===
The United Kingdom has two road numbering schemes, one for Great Britain and the other for Northern Ireland. Both schemes follow the same principles, but the numbers are independent and the same road number may be duplicated between the two schemes.

==== A, B, unnumbered, and unclassified roads ====
Examples of UK road numbers

Motorway

Motorway

Primary route

Non-primary A road

B road

In the United Kingdom, road numbers consist of a number up to 4 digits, prefixed with the letters A or B. The main road from London to Edinburgh was designated the A1 in 1921; the "A" indicates a "trunk" or "principal" road, between regional towns and cities. In Great Britain, the A1, A2, A3, A4, A5 and A6 radiate out from London, or nearby, (in clockwise order) to points around the coast. Some A-roads, or sections of A-roads, are dual carriageway, without being full motorways; some sections upgraded to motorway standards are designated in the form A1(M). B roads are minor roads; they may connect small towns and villages, or offer an alternate route to major roads. Classified unnumbered roads, unofficially called C roads, are smaller roads typically connecting unclassified roads with A and B roads. Unclassified roads are roads intended for local traffic; 60% of UK roads are unclassified, and the 200,000 miles of B, unnumbered, and unclassified roads constitute 87% of total road length in the UK.

All classified roads in England and Wales starting in the zone between the A1 and the A2 begin with the figure 1 (e.g. A137, B1412), all classified roads in England and Wales starting in the zone between the A2 and the A3 begin with the figure 2 (e.g. A213, B2767), all classified roads in England and Wales starting in the zone between the A3 and the A4 begin with the figure 3 (e.g. A374, B3143), etc. Scotland is similarly divided into zones by the A7, A8 and A9 which radiate out from Edinburgh. Zones are not used in Northern Ireland.

==== Motorways ====
Motorways are classified as "special roads", and are numbered in a similar, but not identical, manner. Motorways are either M-class or upgraded A-road, A(M) class. M-class motorways are labelled in the form Mx, as a higher grade of motorway, and A(M) roads are labelled in the form Ax(M), where x is the designation of the road, dependent on the zone. For example, the M25 is the London Orbital Motorway, and the A1(M) is the upgraded A1 dual carriageway.

A similar clock-face zonal system is used in many other European countries (for example, Spain and Belgium).

=== United States ===
Common route number shields used in the United States

Interstate 10

US Route 50

Delaware Route 1 (Note: Other states including Iowa, Kentucky, Mississippi, and New Jersey also use the default circle marker. All other states have their own designs.)

County Route 609 (Essex County, New Jersey)

In the United States, numbered highways belong to one of three or more systems of numbered routes, depending on the state. There are two national-level route numbering systems, the older United States Numbered Highway System laid out in the 1920s, and the newer Interstate Highway System started in the 1950s. Additionally, every state in the U.S. maintains its own set of numbered state highways. Some states have other systems as well, either a system of numbered county highways or secondary state highways. A few cities also have numbered city highways; for example, the city of Charlotte, North Carolina maintains Charlotte Route 4.

The U.S. Highway System, indicated by a white shield with black numbers, is based on a numbering grid, with odd routes running generally north–south and even routes running east–west. Primary routes have a one- or two-digit number, and are supplemented by spur routes that add a hundreds digit to their parent route. Routes increase from east-to-west and north-to-south, such that U.S. Route 1 follows the Atlantic Seaboard fall line, while U.S. Route 101 does the same at the Pacific Ocean Coast. Likewise U.S. Route 2 runs near the Canadian border, while U.S. Route 98 follows the Gulf Coast. Major cross-country routes end in either a "1" or a "0". For example, U.S. Route 20 is a route that runs over 3,000 miles (4,800 km) from Boston, Massachusetts, to Newport, Oregon, while U.S. Route 41 spans the country from Miami, Florida, to the Upper Peninsula of Michigan. Routes like U.S. Route 141 and U.S. Route 441 branch off U.S. Route 41. U.S. Route 66, known as the "Mother Road", was a cultural touchstone that inspired literature, songs, and other media from its creation in 1926 until it was superseded by segments of the Interstate Highway System. Parts of the road have been designated "Historic Route 66".

The Interstate Highway System, indicated by a red and blue shield with white numbers, is a system of entirely freeways (unlike the U.S. Highway System, which is mostly undivided surface roads). The Interstate System is also based on a grid, with east–west routes bearing even numbers and north–south routes bearing odd numbers. In order to prevent confusion with the earlier U.S. Highway System, however, the Interstates are numbered in the opposite direction, such that the lowest routes numbers are in the south and west, and the highest numbers in the north and east. Major routes end in either a "0" or a "5"; for example Interstate 10 spans the country from Jacksonville, Florida, to Santa Monica, California, while Interstate 35 goes from the Mexican border to the Great Lakes. Like with U.S. Highways, subsidiary routes are numbered by adding a hundreds digit to the parent route. Because of the large number of these routes, three-digit numbers may be repeated within the system, but unique to each state. Additionally, the parity of the hundreds digit tells the nature of the spur route: odd hundreds digits like Interstate 393 only connect to the system at one end (forming "spurs"), while an even hundreds digit like Interstate 440 indicates that the highway connects to another Interstate at both ends (forming loops).

The numbering system for state highways varies widely from state to state. Each state decides how to number its own routes. Some maintain systems similar to the national road systems, based on a grid. Others number highways regionally, with similar numbers occurring in the same area of the state. Still others have no discernible system, with no connection between a route's location and its number.

In addition to numbers, route numbers also use suffixed letters and banners appended to the tops of signs to indicate alternate routes to the main highway. For example, U.S. Route 1A is the name given to many highways which are either older alignments of U.S. Route 1 or provide an alternate route either around or through a city along U.S. Route 1's route. Banners are sometimes used to indicate alternate routes. Words like "Alternate", "Business", or "Bypass" can be added to a sign to indicate such a situation.

=== Elsewhere ===
Some countries, such as Brazil, number their national highways by direction. (BR1xx = North/South highways, BR2xx = East/West, BR3xx = 'Diagonal' (i.e. NW/SE or NE/SW)).

==== Cyprus A, B, E, F system ====
A stands for motorway and B is for main roads. E and F are for smaller local roads.

==== Estonian T system ====
T is the prefix for all roads, however not represented on route shields. The prefix is mostly only used by the Estonian Road Administration and is not in common usage when referring to roads.

==== French A, N, D system ====
A stands for "autoroute" (motorway), N for "national road", D for "départementale" road and C for "communale". France still uses Route Nationale numbers from an 1824 revision of 1811 numbers made under Napoleon.

==== Irish M, N, R, L system ====
M stands for Motorway, N for National primary road or National secondary road, R for Regional road and L for Local road.

==== Japanese C, E system ====
C stands for circular, E stands for expressway. These designations are used on most expressways in Japan outside of the urban systems. The designations, depicted with a green rectangle with white numbers and letters, are used on guide signs as well as highway shields.

==== Netherlands' A, N system ====
A stands for "Autosnelweg" (motorway), N for Non motorways. The A-codes use white letters on a red shield, the N-codes black letters on a yellow shield. Where a highway changes into a motorway or vice versa, it may continue to use the same number, but the letter and the color are switched.
When the letter is followed by three digits, the road is typically a provincial road. When there are only one or two digits, it is typically a national road.

==== Philippines E, N system ====
Philippine expressway and national road shields. Expressway are designated with "E", and signed with the letter. National roads omit the "N" on signage

The Philippines' new route numbering system, started in 2014, for its network of expressways (limited access roads) and national roads (of the primary and secondary types), uses E and N, respectively. National roads ("N" roads, of the primary and secondary designation) use white shields based on the Australian National Route shields, but signed with the number only, with N included for inventory purposes. Expressways ("E" roads) uses signs the same design as with national primary and secondary roads, but colored yellow, and unlike national roads, includes E to prevent confusion.

==== Polish A, S, DK, DW system ====
Polish roads plates. Motorways are designated with "A", expressways are designated with "S". National roads and voivodeship roads display only numbers on signage
- A stands for "autostrada" (motorway)
- S stands for "droga ekspresowa" (expressway)
- DK stands for "droga krajowa" (national road)
- DW stands for "droga wojewódzka" (voivodeship/provincial road)

There are also county roads (DP, "droga powiatowa") and communal/municipal roads (DG, "droga gminna"). However the numbers of these types of routes are only for administrative purposes, therefore not displayed on signage.

==== Senegal N, R system ====
N stands for "national" roads while R is for "regional" roads.

==== South African N, R, M system ====
N stands for national road, R stands for regional road and M stands for metropolitan road.

==== Spain A, AP, N system ====
- A, followed by one or two digits, stands for "autovía" (dual carriageway).
  - If followed by three or four digits, it is road owned by a regional government, usually Andalusia or Aragon, and may or may not be a divided highway.
- AP stands for "autopista de peaje" (toll motorway)
- N stands for "nacional" (national), single carriageway road owned by the national Government. National roads 1 to 6 are radial roads linking Madrid with major cities or borders with France and Portugal. All other roads are numbered with three digits.

Other letters refer to the code of the region or city that is served by the road. See for example M-30, with M standing for Madrid.

==== Turkey O, D, I system ====
O-1 (Otoyol 1)

- O stands for "Otoyol" (motorway)
- D stands for "Devlet Yolu" (expressways/major highways)
- I stands for "Il Yolu" (provincial roads/minor highways)

==== Vietnamese QL, TL, HL system ====
"QL" on a national road shield

The following abbreviations appear on guide signs and kilometer posts:

CT
cao tốc (expressway)
QL
quốc lộ (national road)
TL or ĐT
tỉnh lộ or đường tỉnh (provincial road)
HL
hương lộ or huyện lộ (rural district road)
ĐCK
đường cặp kênh (canal towpath)

== See also ==
- Highway shield
- Highway location marker
- Driver location signs
- Asian Highway Network
- Auxiliary route (United States)
- China road numbering
- International E-road network (Europe)
- State-numbered route (countries that are divided into states)
- Numbered street
- List of roads and highways
