= J road =

J road may refer to:

- roads in Johor in the Malaysian State Roads system
- Corridor J, a highway in the U.S. states of Tennessee and Kentucky

== See also ==
- J Street (disambiguation)
