= K road =

K road may refer to:

- Kreisstraßen in Germany
- Karangahape Road, a street in Auckland, New Zealand
- K Road Station, a train station in Auckland CBD
- K roads in Malaysia, roads in Kedah
- Kansas numbered route: See List of Kansas numbered highways
- Corridor K, part of the Appalachian Development Highway System
