= I road =

I road or variations may refer to:

- Interstate Highways in the USA
- Corridor I of the Appalachian Development Highway System
- Toyota i-Road, 2013 Toyota Motors concept vehicle
- Avenue I, New York City
  - Avenue I (IND Culver Line)
- I Street Bridge

== See also ==
- I (disambiguation)
- 1 (disambiguation)
- List of highways numbered 1
- First Street (disambiguation)
- First Avenue (disambiguation)
