= N road =

N road may refer to:

- a number of National roads in different countries
- N roads in Malaysia are roads in Negeri Sembilan
- "N roads" in the Netherlands are Provinciale weg
- National routes in South Africa
- Corridor N, a highway in the U.S. states of Maryland and Pennsylvania
- N roads in Zimbabwe
