= L road =

L road may refer to:

- Landesstraßen in Germany
- link roads in the old road system of Ireland
- local roads in the current road system of Ireland
- Corridor L, a part of the Appalachian Development Highway System in the U.S. state of West Virginia
- Small roads or short distance roads in Zimbabwe
