= R road =

R road may refer to:

- Ring roads in Belgium
- R roads in the Czech Republic - expressways
- Regional roads in Ireland
- R roads in Malaysia, roads in Perlis
- Regional roads in Senegal
- R roads in Slovakia are "Rýchlostná cesta" (expressways)
- Regional Routes in South Africa, designated with letter R
- Provincial Routes in South Africa, also designated with letter R
- Corridor R, a highway in the U.S. state of Kentucky
