= P road =

P road may refer to:

- P roads in Belarus, republican roads
- P road in Latvia, first class roads
- P roads in Malaysia, roads in Penang
- P roads in Ukraine, state regional roads
- Corridor P, a highway in the U.S. state of Pennsylvania
