= V road =

V road may refer to:

- vertical roads in the Milton Keynes grid road system
- Corridor V (disambiguation)
