= J Street (disambiguation) =

J Street is a nonprofit liberal Zionist advocacy group based in the United States.

J Street may also refer to:

- J Street (Washington, D.C.), a street that would be between I Street and K Street, but in Washington D.C. is conspicuously absent.
- J Street, the former dining hall and food court at The George Washington University

== See also ==
- Street (surname), for a list of people whose first initial is J. with a last name of Street
- Jane Street, an investing firm.
- Jay Street (disambiguation)
