= M road =

M road may refer to:

- Motorways:
  - Motorways in Hungary
  - Motorways in the United Kingdom
  - Motorways in the Republic of Ireland
- M road in Australia are primary roads
- M roads in Malaysia are roads in Malacca
- M road in the USA may refer to
  - List of state trunklines in Michigan
  - Corridor M, part of the Appalachian Development Highway System
- M roads in Ukraine are international highways
- M roads in Zambia
- M roads in Zimbabwe
