= Y road =

Y road may refer to:

- Y junction (disambiguation)
- interchange on the Greek Attiki Odos highway
