= S road =

S road may refer to:

- Staatsstraßen in Saxony
- Express roads in Poland
- in the USA :
  - California county routes in zone S
  - Corridor S, a road from Interstate 81 north of White Pine, Tennessee to Corridor F (State Route 63) in Harrogate
