= C road =

C road may refer to:

- In Malaysia, Malaysian State Roads system, in Pahang
- In Namibia, C roads in Namibia
- In Great Britain, Great Britain road numbering scheme#Other classifications
- In the Isle of Man, List of roads on the Isle of Man#"C" roads
- In the United States:
  - C-Road, California, a census-designated place in Plumas County
  - Colorado State Highway 470, the only Colorado route to use the label
  - County-designated highways in zone C in Michigan
  - Corridor C, part of the Appalachian Development Highway System
