= U road =

U road may refer to:

- Unclassified roads in the United Kingdom :
  - U roads in Great Britain
  - U roads on the Isle of Man
- One of the numbered state highways in Utah, United States: See List of state highways in Utah
- Corridor U, part of the Appalachian Development Highway System
