= F road =

F road may refer to:

- F roads in Cyprus are local roads
- F roads in Iceland are tracks that require a four-wheel-drive vehicle
- F road in the USA may refer to:
  - County-designated highways in zone F in Michigan
  - Corridor F, a highway in the U.S. states of Tennessee and Kentucky
- F roads in Zimbabwe are freeways
