= Corridor V =

Corridor V may refer to:

- Corridor V (Appalachian Development Highway System)
- Corridor V (Pan-European corridor)
