= E road =

E road may refer to:

- a road of the International E-road network in Europe
- E roads in Cyprus are secondary roads
- Malaysian Expressway System
- E roads in Zimbabwe are expressways
- Corridor E, a road from Morgantown, West Virginia, at Interstate 79 to Hancock, Maryland
- an electric road which provides electric power to vehicles on it, through trolley wires or conductor rails embedded in its surface.
