= X road =

X road may refer to:

- Nalgonda 'X' Roads, a major junction in Hyderabad, Andhra Pradesh, India
- Corridor X, the part of Interstate 22 east of Fulton, Mississippi
- X-Road, part of the e-Estonia initiative, developed by Cybernetica (Estonian company)
