= T road =

T road may refer to:

- T roads in Zambia
- T roads in Terrengganu, Malaysia, part of the Malaysian State Roads system
- T roads in Ukraine, regional network of territorial roads
- Trunk roads in the old road system of Ireland
- Corridor T, part of the Appalachian Development Highway System in Pennsylvania and New York, U.S.
