= Jay Street =

Jay Street may refer to:

Transportation

- Jay Street – MetroTech (New York City Subway), a New York City Subway station complex at Jay, Lawrence and Willoughby Streets in Brooklyn consisting of:
  - Jay Street – MetroTech (IND Fulton Street Line); serving the A and C trains
  - Jay Street – MetroTech (IND Culver Line); serving the F and <F> trains
  - Jay Street – MetroTech (BMT Fourth Avenue Line); serving the N, R, and W trains
- Bridge–Jay Streets (BMT Myrtle Avenue Line), a demolished New York City Subway elevated station

People

- Jay Street, a pen name of Henry Slesar

== See also ==
- Jay Street Bridge, in Pennsylvania
