= D road =

D road may refer to:

- D roads in Malaysia are roads in Kelantan
- D roads in Slovakia are motorways (diaľnica)
- D roads in the Czech Republic are motorways (dálnice)
- D roads in the United Kingdom may be:
  - D roads in Great Britain or on the Isle of Man which are local lower traffic roads
  - A500 road, a major primary A road in Staffordshire and Cheshire, England
- D roads in Turkey are State Highways of the Republic of Turkey
- D roads in the USA may refer to:
  - County-Designated Highways in zone D in Michigan
  - Corridor D, a road from Bridgeport, West Virginia to Cincinnati, Ohio
