= H road =

H road may refer to:

- Horizontal Grid Roads in the Milton Keynes grid road system
- H roads in Slovenia are Hitra cesta, a type of highway
- H roads in Ukraine are national roads
- In the United States:
  - Interstate Highways in Hawaii: See Category:Interstate Highways in Hawaii
  - County-designated highways in zone H in Michigan
  - Corridor H, part of the Appalachian Development Highway System
