= W road =

W road may refer to:

- Roads in Java in Indonesia
- Corridor W, a road from Interstate 85 southwest of Greenville, South Carolina to Interstate 26 southeast of Hendersonville, North Carolina, US 25, as well as US 25 Truck near Hendersonville
- "W" Road, a road on the National Register of Historic Places in Hamilton County, Tennessee
