= G road =

G road may refer to:

- China National Highways, a series of trunk roads throughout mainland China with G-prefixed road numbers
- In the United States:
  - County-designated highways in zone G in Michigan
  - Corridor G, part of the Appalachian Development Highway System in Kentucky and West Virginia
