= Mackeyville, Pennsylvania =

Unincorporated community in Pennsylvania, US

- Unincorporated community
- Location within Pennsylvania
- Coordinates: 41°03′16″N 77°27′41″W
- Country: United States
- State: Pennsylvania
- County: Clinton
- Elevation: 587 ft (179 m)
- Time zone: UTC-5 (Eastern (EST))
  - Summer (DST): UTC-4 (EDT)
- ZIP code: 17750
- Area codes: 272 & 570
- GNIS feature ID: 1180163

Mackeyville is an unincorporated community in Clinton County, Pennsylvania, United States. The community is 5.8 miles (9.3 km) south of Lock Haven. Mackeyville has a post office with ZIP code 17750. Mackeyville is located near the eastern terminus of Nittany Valley. Fishing Creek runs along the eastern edge of town center head south to north. Fishing creek is a free limestone stream and parts of it are designated trophy trout stream.

== History ==
Mackyville was a small transportation hub in the 1800s. Old narrow gage rail beds and parts of the canal system can still be seen in a few locations.

== Demographics ==
Historical population
Census	Pop.	Note	%±

The United States Census Bureau defined Mackeyville as a census designated place (CDP) in 2023.

== Recreation ==
Just east of Mackeyville is Belle Springs Golf Course and the Clinton County Fairgrounds. The entrance for the golf course and Fairgrounds are both located on Fairgrounds road. Belles Springs also has a small playground located on Belle Springs Road along Fishing Creek.

== Geology ==
Mackeyville is located in the Ridge and Valley system. Locally the town and surrounding areas rest on the Bellefonte Formation, the springs in the area being attributed to the resulting karst topography. This is due to that Bellefonte Formation being a predominately acarbonate rock. Several exposures maybe found along the streams and a rock cuts along Mackeyville Rd and Duck Run Rd.
