= Y junction =

Y junction may refer to one of several things.

- A three-way junction of roads
- A Wye (rail) junction that takes the form of a triangle of railway lines
