= List of municipalities in Soria =

This is a list of the municipalities in the province of Soria, as of this date, in the autonomous community of Castile-Leon, Spain.

Map of Spain with Soria highlighted

Province of Soria

Municipality	Pop. (2002)
Abejar	358
Adradas	91
Ágreda	3,219
Alconaba	169
Alcubilla de Avellaneda	209
Alcubilla de las Peñas	97
Aldealafuente	140
Aldealices	29
Aldealpozo	32
Aldealseñor	46
Aldehuela de Periáñez	44
Las Aldehuelas	110
Alentisque	41
Aliud	34
Almajano	210
Almaluez	283
Almarza	595
Almazán	5,750
Almazul	167
Almenar de Soria	360
Alpanseque	100
Arancón	115
Arcos de Jalón	1,797
Arenillas	40
Arévalo de la Sierra	92
Ausejo de la Sierra	60
Baraona	230
Barca	128
Barcones	45
Bayubas de Abajo	278
Bayubas de Arriba	72
Beratón	34
Berlanga de Duero	1,132
Blacos	60
Bliecos	53
Borjabad	60
Borobia	372
Buberos	47
Buitrago	56
Burgo de Osma-Ciudad de Osma	5,086
Cabrejas del Campo	82
Cabrejas del Pinar	485
Calatañazor	65
Caltojar	119
Candilichera	218
Cañamaque	42
Carabantes	38
Caracena	17
Carrascosa de Abajo	35
Carrascosa de la Sierra	13
Casarejos	257
Castilfrío de la Sierra	27
Castilruiz	307
Castillejo de Robledo	180
Centenera de Andaluz	28
Cerbón	47
Cidones	341
Cigudosa	66
Cihuela	93
Ciria	115
Cirujales del Río	40
Coscurita	135
Covaleda	1,961
Cubilla	63
Cubo de la Solana	235
Cueva de Ágreda	90
Dévanos	123
Deza	370
Duruelo de la Sierra	1,496
Escobosa de Almazán	39
Espeja de San Marcelino	250
Espejón	225
Estepa de San Juan	12
Frechilla de Almazán	43
Fresno de Caracena	50
Fuentearmegil	313
Fuentecambrón	65
Fuentecantos	54
Fuentelmonge	131
Fuentelsaz de Soria	59
Fuentepinilla	144
Fuentes de Magaña	92
Fuentestrún	71
Garray	482
Golmayo	942
Gómara	444
Gormaz	20
Herrera de Soria	23
Hinojosa del Campo	45
Langa de Duero	873
Liceras	63
La Losilla	18
Magaña	114
Maján	21
Matalebreras	121
Matamala de Almazán	393
Medinaceli	739
Miño de Medinaceli	111
Miño de San Esteban	90
Molinos de Duero	182
Momblona	38
Monteagudo de las Vicarías	278
Montejo de Tiermes	245
Montenegro de Cameros	109
Morón de Almazán	257
Muriel de la Fuente	82
Muriel Viejo	72
Nafría de Ucero	81
Narros	50
Navaleno	960
Nepas	82
Nolay	92
Noviercas	229
Ólvega	3,350
Oncala	105
Pinilla del Campo	23
Portillo de Soria	22
La Póveda de Soria	118
Pozalmuro	110
Quintana Redonda	566
Quintanas de Gormaz	195
Quiñonería	15
Los Rábanos	447
Rebollar	50
Recuerda	114
Rello	34
Renieblas	123
Retortillo de Soria	238
Reznos	45
La Riba de Escalote	25
Rioseco de Soria	142
Rollamienta	46
El Royo	319
Salduero	193
San Esteban de Gormaz	3,387
San Felices	87
San Leonardo de Yagüe	2,158
San Pedro Manrique	538
Santa Cruz de Yanguas	65
Santa María de Huerta	432
Santa María de las Hoyas	195
Serón de Nágima	228
Soliedra	37
Soria	35,112
Sotillo del Rincón	232
Suellacabras	36
Tajahuerce	41
Tajueco	117
Talveila	193
Tardelcuende	618
Taroda	80
Tejado	198
Torlengua	104
Torreblacos	33
Torrubia de Soria	96
Trévago	70
Ucero	98
Vadillo	139
Valdeavellano de Tera	256
Valdegeña	50
Valdelagua del Cerro	20
Valdemaluque	274
Valdenebro	145
Valdeprado	20
Valderrodilla	115
Valtajeros	27
Velamazán	139
Velilla de la Sierra	25
Velilla de los Ajos	43
Viana de Duero	76
Villaciervos	94
Villanueva de Gormaz	18
Villar del Ala	63
Villar del Campo	37
Villar del Río	176
Los Villares de Soria	119
Villasayas	102
Villaseca de Arciel	42
Vinuesa	1,057
Vizmanos	37
Vozmediano	47
Yanguas	134
Yelo	56

== See also ==
- Geography of Spain
- List of cities in Spain
