= Fuentecantos =

- Municipality
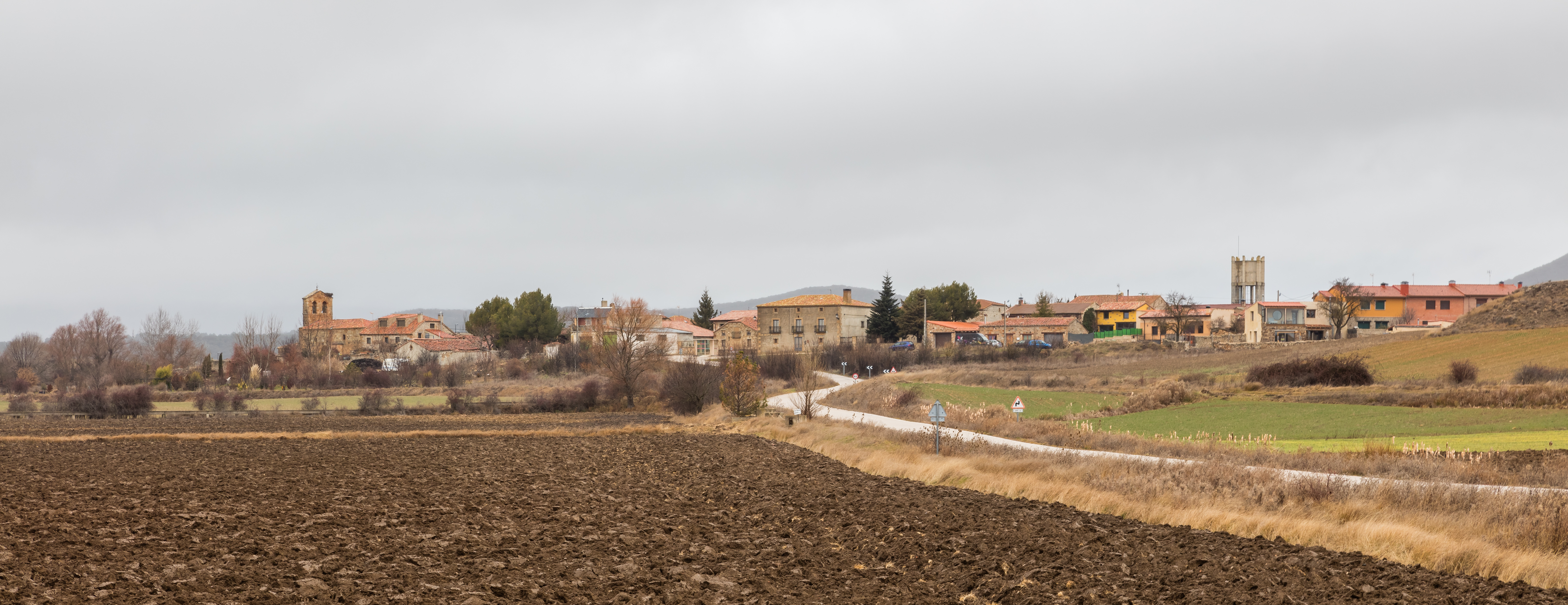
- View of Fuentecantos, Soria, Spain

- Location in Spain. Fuentecantos (Spain)
- Coordinates: 41°50′59″N 2°25′41″W
- Country: Spain
- Autonomous community: Castile and León
- Province: Soria
- Municipality: Fuentecantos

Area
  - Total: 8 km^{2} (3.1 sq mi)

Population (2025-01-01)
  - Total: 65
  - Density: 8.1/km^{2} (21/sq mi)
- Time zone: UTC+1 (CET)
  - Summer (DST): UTC+2 (CEST)
- Website: Official website

Fuentecantos is a municipality located in the province of Soria, Castile and León, Spain. According to the 2004 census (INE), the municipality has a population of 55 inhabitants.
