= Tajahuerce =

- Municipality
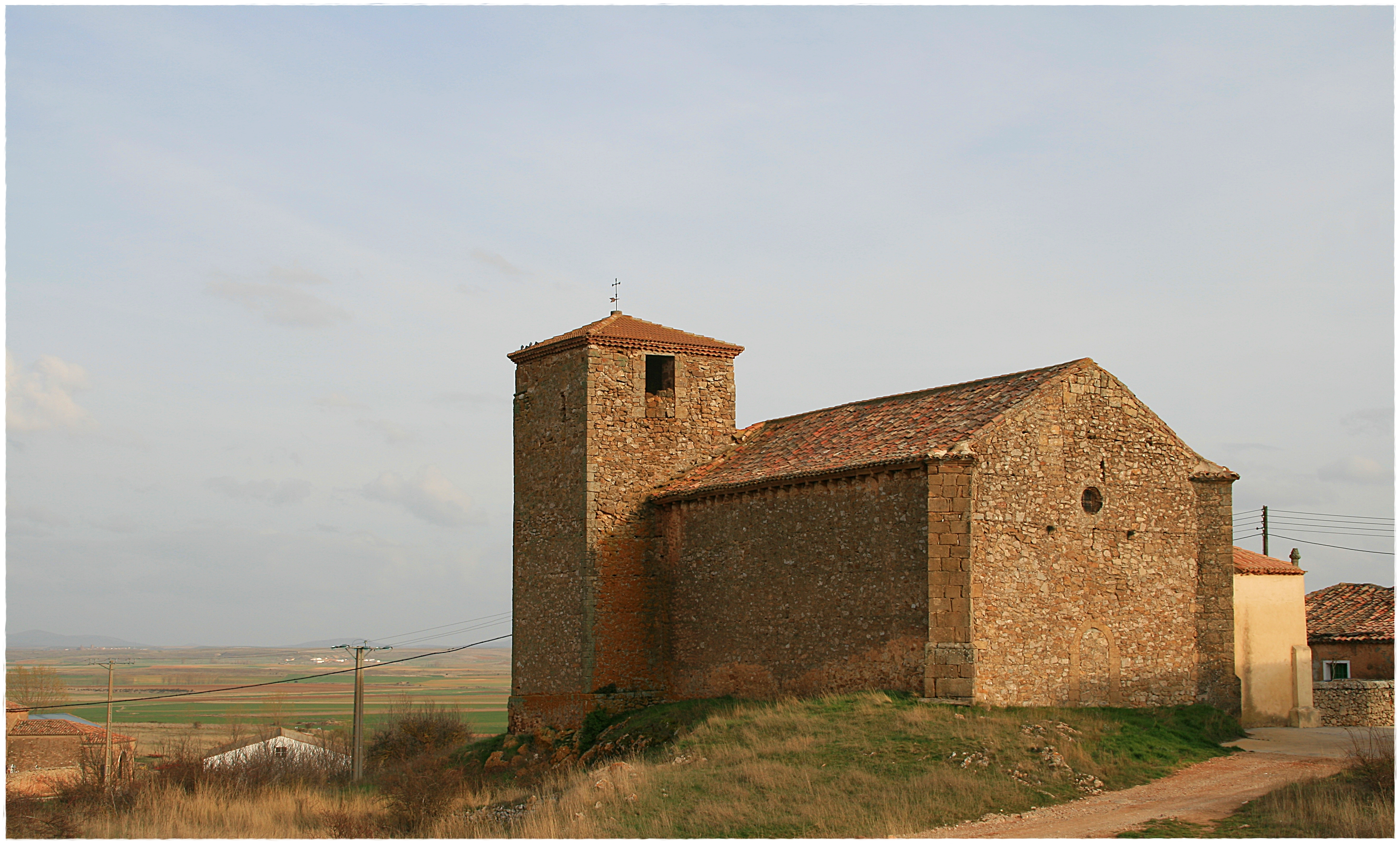

- Location in Spain. Tajahuerce (Spain)
- Coordinates: 41°44′26″N 2°09′01″W
- Country: Spain
- Autonomous community: Castile and León
- Province: Soria
- Municipality: Tajahuerce

Area
  - Total: 20.87 km^{2} (8.06 sq mi)
- Elevation: 1,051 m (3,448 ft)

Population (2025-01-01)
  - Total: 22
  - Density: 1.1/km^{2} (2.7/sq mi)
- Time zone: UTC+1 (CET)
  - Summer (DST): UTC+2 (CEST)
- Website: Official website

Tajahuerce is a municipality located in the province of Soria, Castile and León, Spain. According to the 2004 census (INE), the municipality had a population of 37 inhabitants.
