= Castillejo de Robledo =

- Municipality
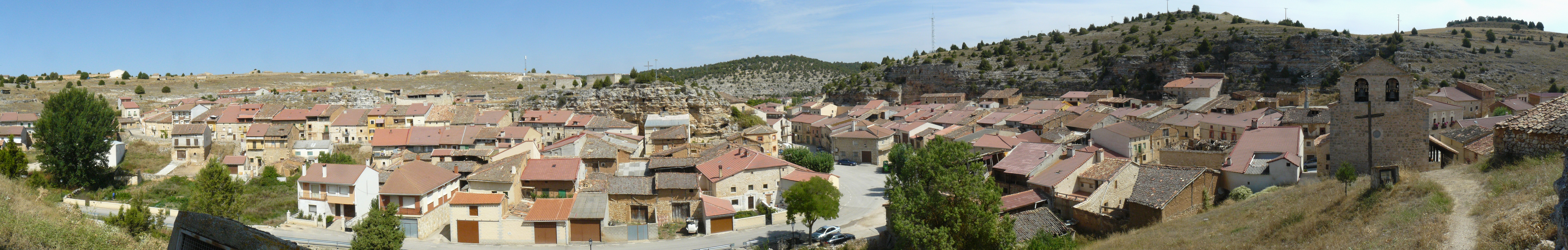

- Flag Coat of arms

- Location in Spain. Castillejo de Robledo (Spain)
- Country: Spain
- Autonomous community: Castile and León
- Province: Soria
- Municipality: Castillejo de Robledo

Area
  - Total: 53 km^{2} (20 sq mi)

Population (2025-01-01)
  - Total: 100
  - Density: 1.9/km^{2} (4.9/sq mi)
- Time zone: UTC+1 (CET)
  - Summer (DST): UTC+2 (CEST)
- Website: Official website

Castillejo de Robledo is a municipality located in the province of Soria, Castile and León, Spain. According to the 2004 census (INE), the municipality has a population of 161 inhabitants.

== Gallery of Castillejo de Robledo ==
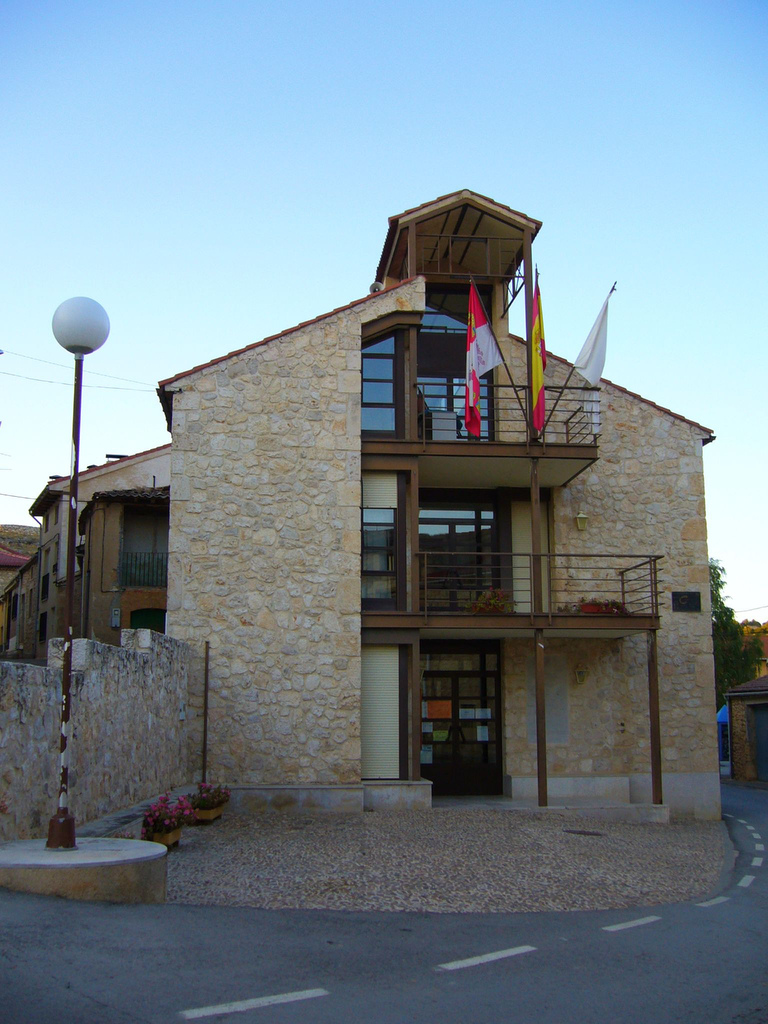
Ayuntamiento of Castillejo de Robledo.

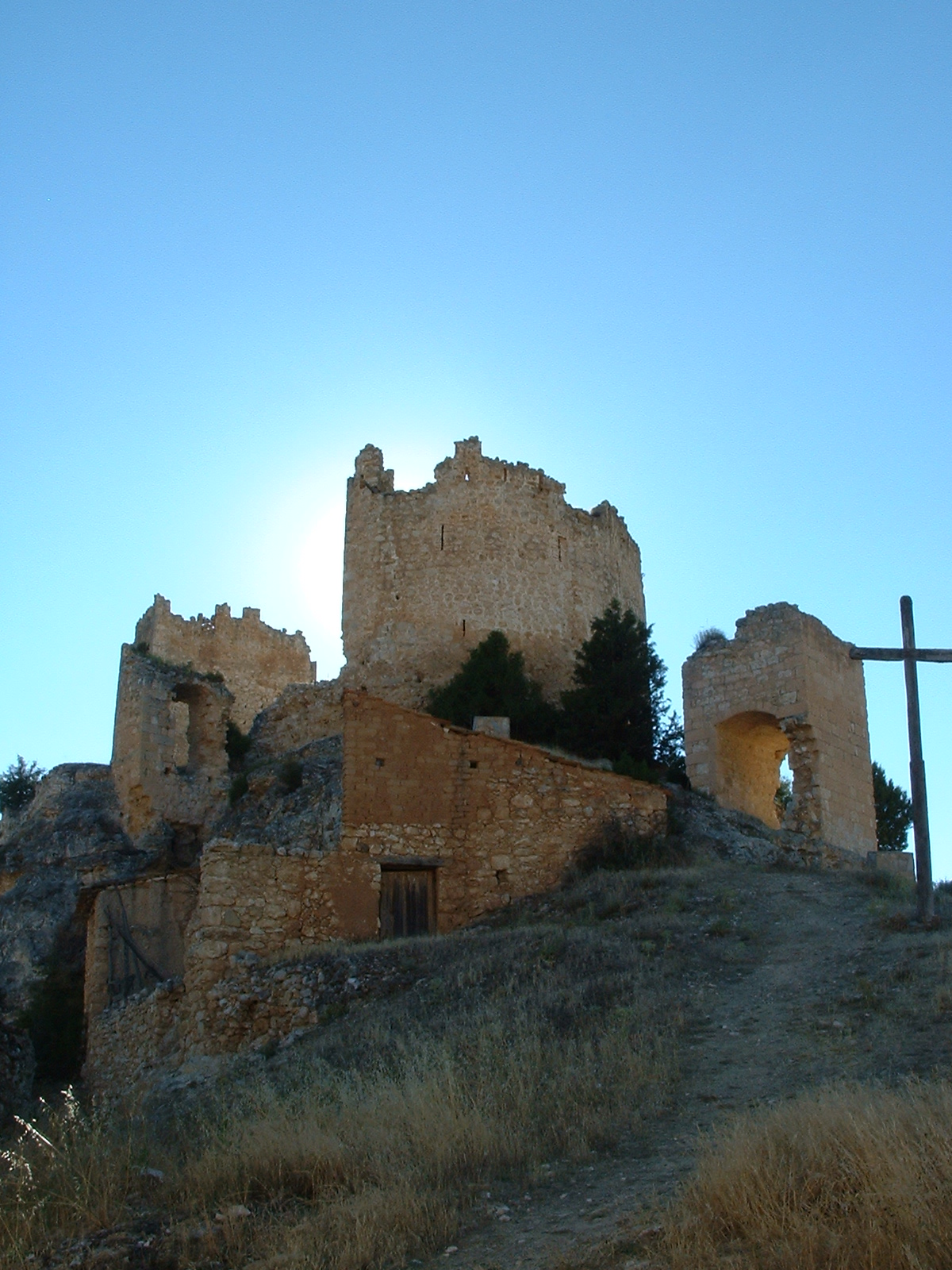
The Templar Castle.

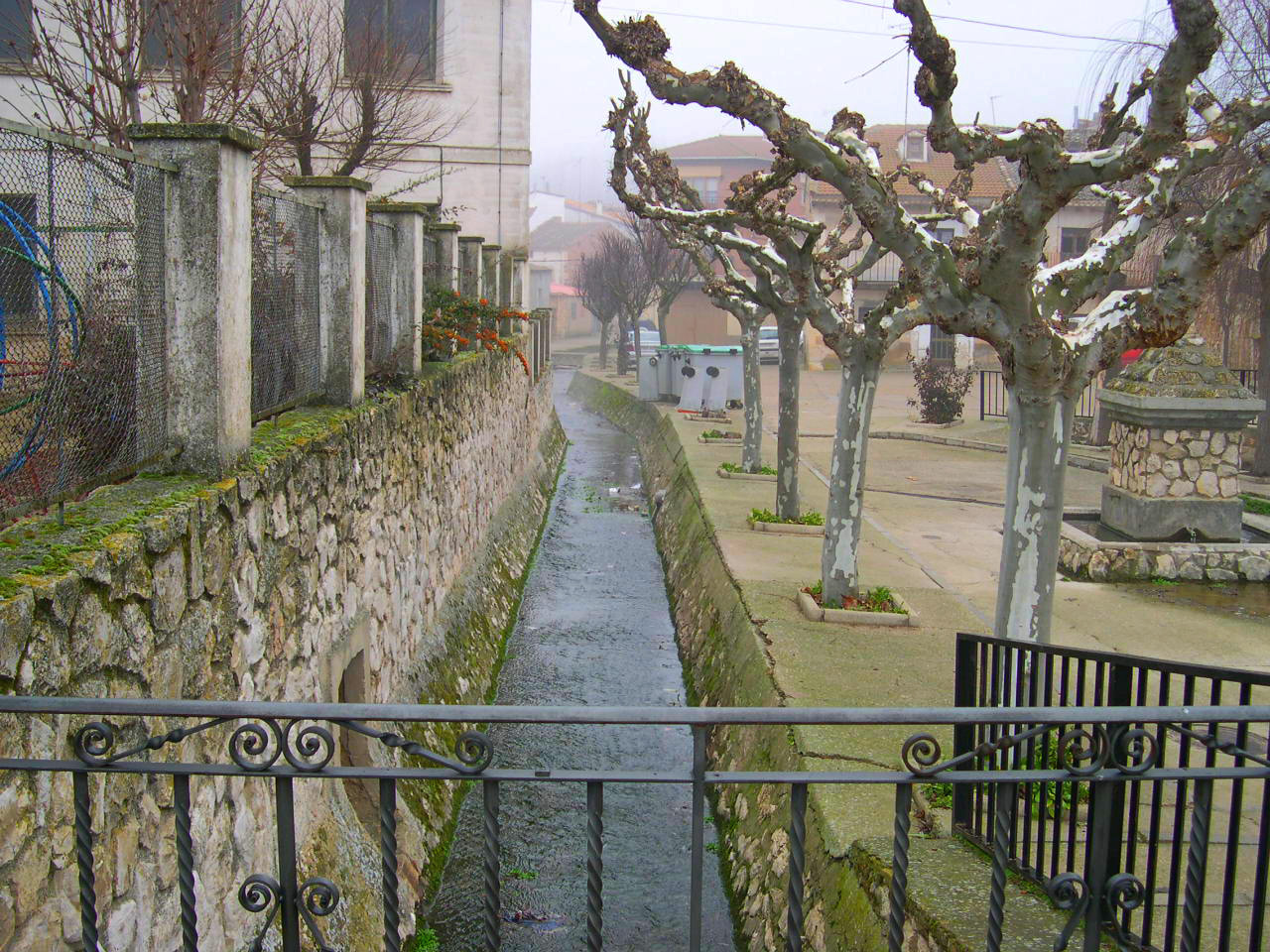
Stream of Castillejo de Robledo.

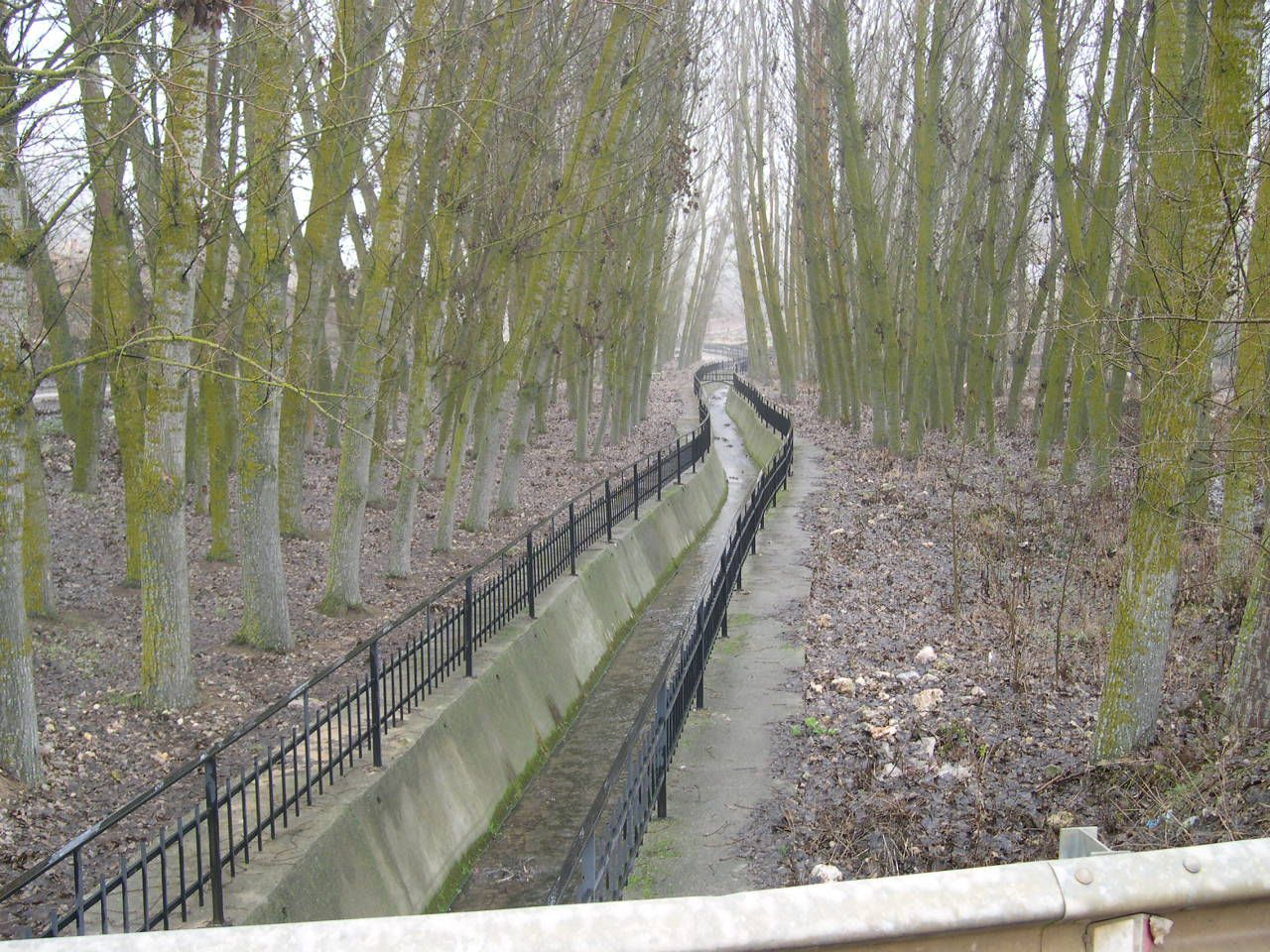
Castillejo de Robledo's Landscape.
