= Recuerda =

- Municipality
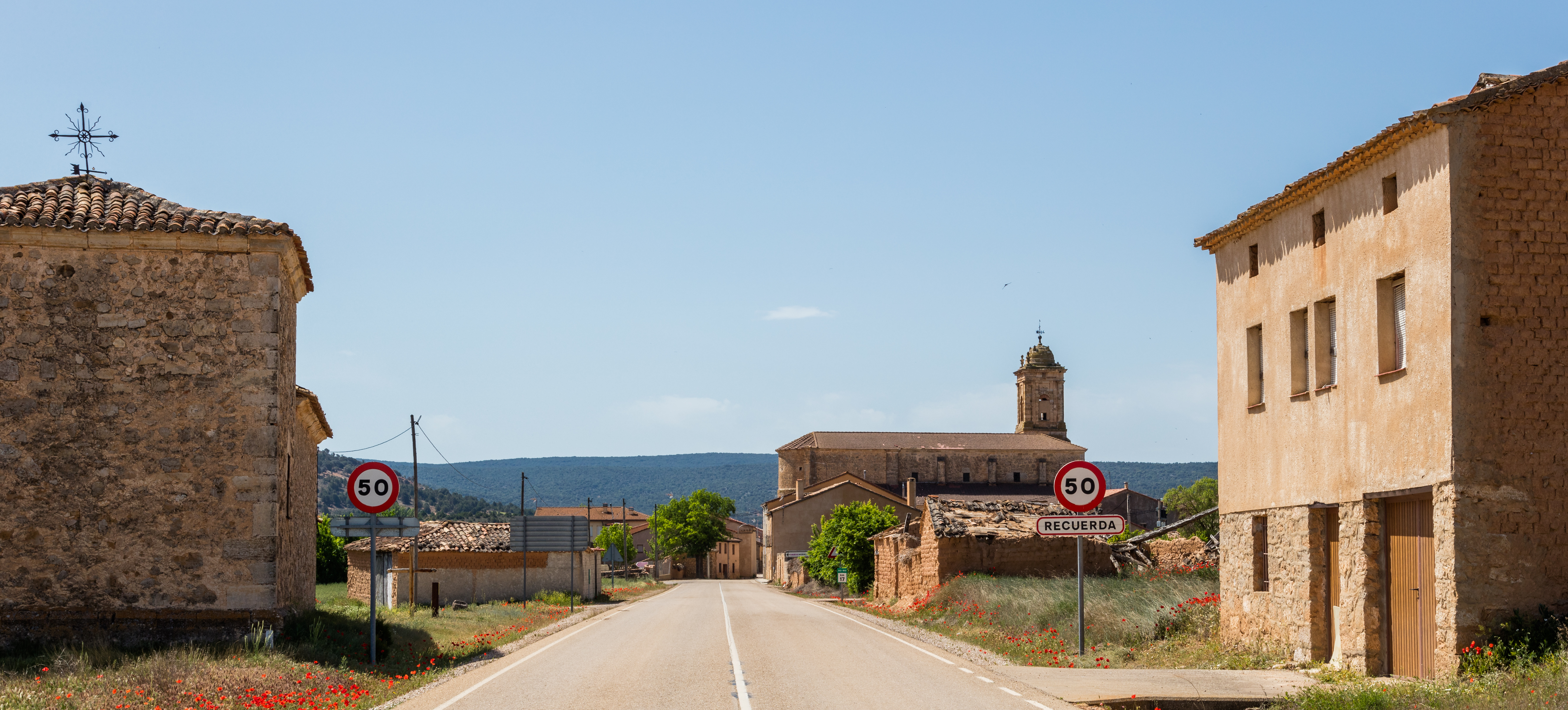
- Street of Recuerda

- Location in Spain. Recuerda (Spain)
- Coordinates: 41°28′31″N 2°59′41″W
- Country: Spain
- Autonomous community: Castile and León
- Province: Soria
- Municipality: Recuerda

Area
  - Total: 66 km^{2} (25 sq mi)

Population (2025-01-01)
  - Total: 61
  - Density: 0.92/km^{2} (2.4/sq mi)
- Time zone: UTC+1 (CET)
  - Summer (DST): UTC+2 (CEST)
- Website: Official website

Recuerda is a municipality located in the province of Soria, Castile and León, Spain. According to the 2004 census (INE), the municipality has a population of 113 inhabitants.
