= Magaña =

- Municipality
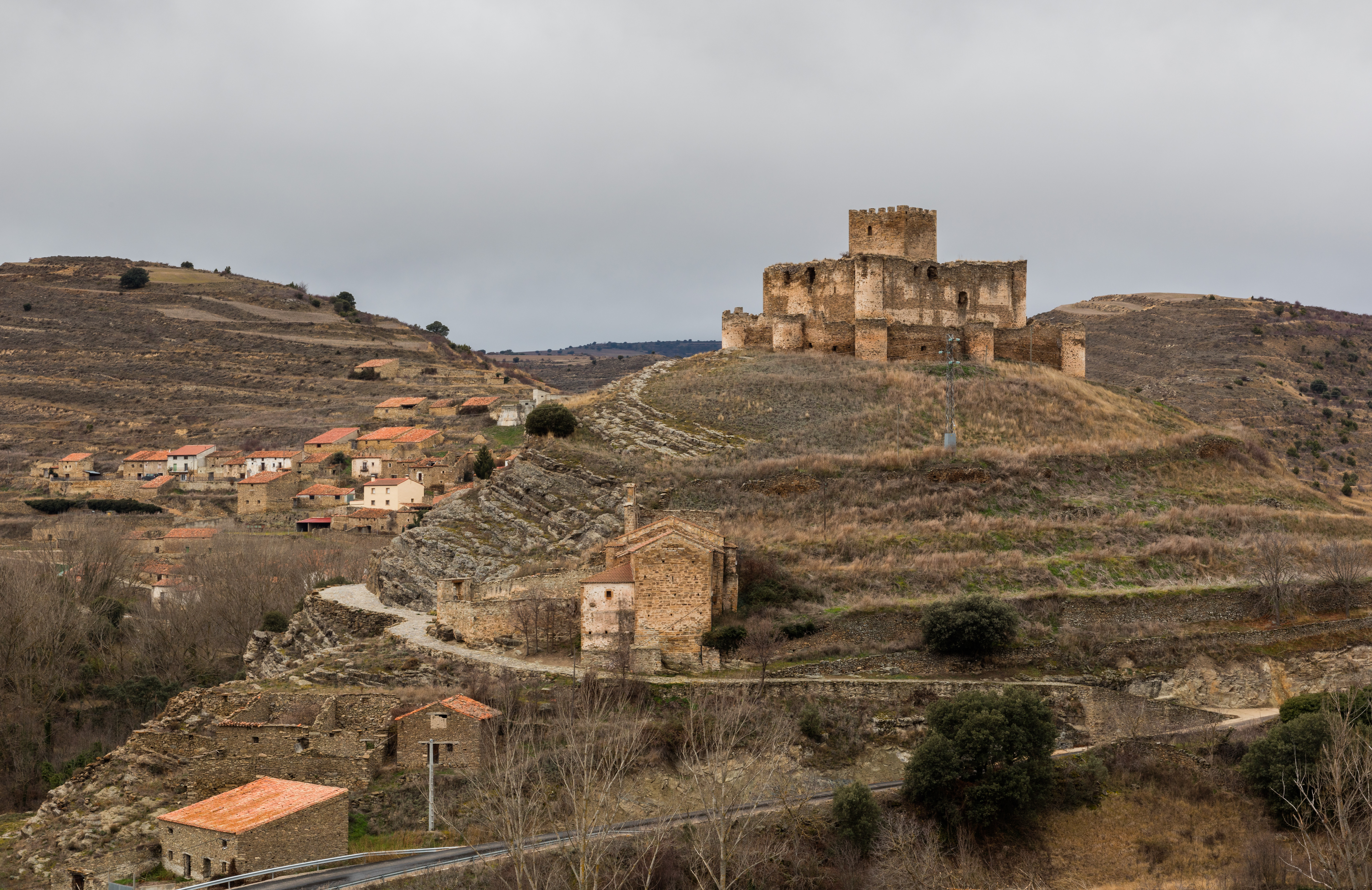

- Coat of arms

- Location in Spain. Magaña (Spain)
- Coordinates: 41°53′58″N 2°09′42″W
- Country: Spain
- Autonomous community: Castile and León
- Province: Soria
- Municipality: Magaña

Area
  - Total: 58 km^{2} (22 sq mi)

Population (2025-01-01)
  - Total: 61
  - Density: 1.1/km^{2} (2.7/sq mi)
- Time zone: UTC+1 (CET)
  - Summer (DST): UTC+2 (CEST)
- Website: Official website

Magaña is a municipality located in the province of Soria, Castile and León, Spain. According to the 2004 census (INE), the municipality has a population of 108 inhabitants.
