= Aliud =

- Municipality
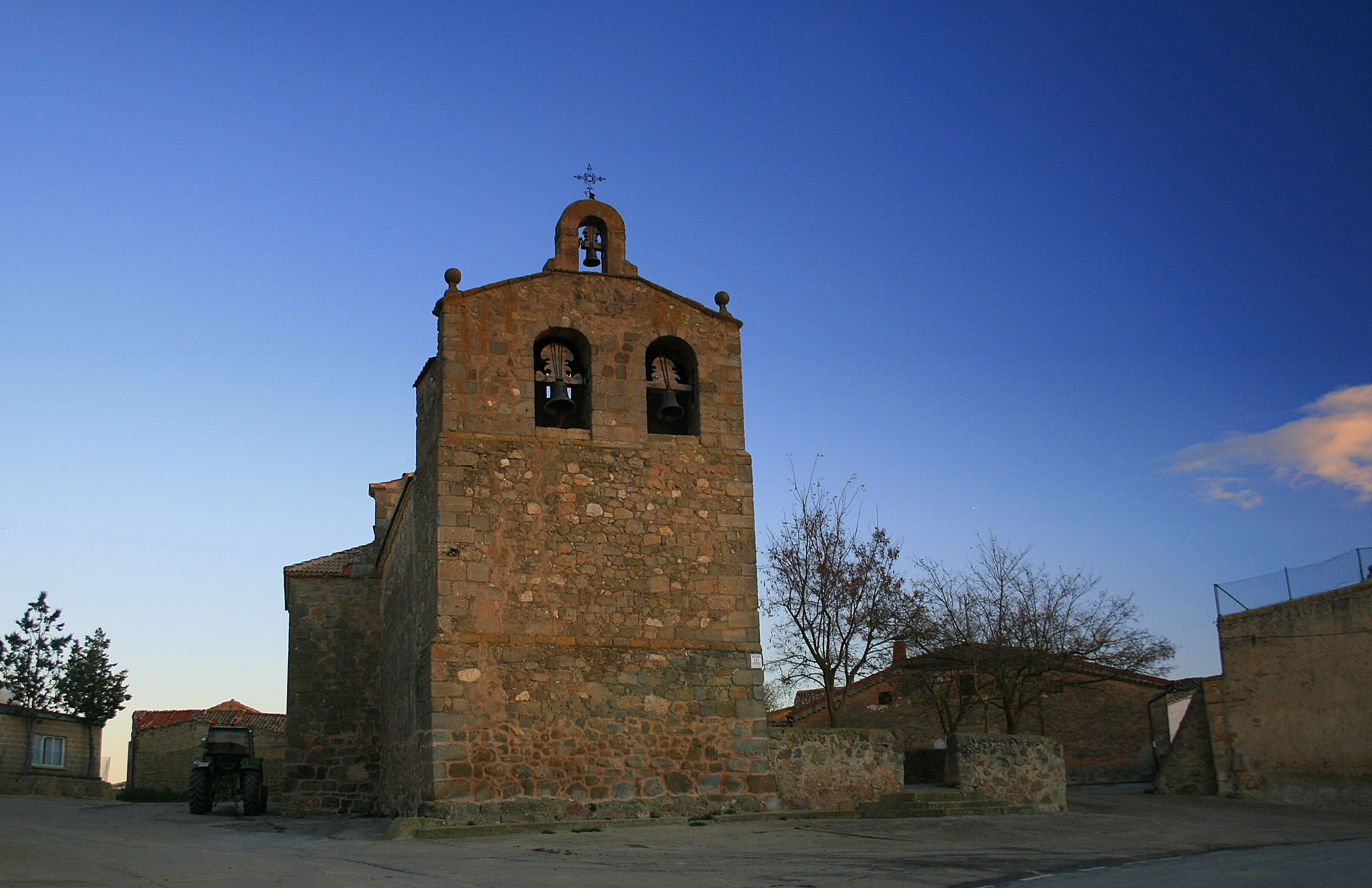

- Location in Spain. Aliud (Spain)
- Country: Spain
- Autonomous community: Castile and León
- Province: Soria
- Municipality: Aliud

Area
  - Total: 17 km^{2} (6.6 sq mi)

Population (2025-01-01)
  - Total: 20
  - Density: 1.2/km^{2} (3.0/sq mi)
- Time zone: UTC+1 (CET)
  - Summer (DST): UTC+2 (CEST)
- Website: Official website

Aliud is a municipality located in the province of Soria, Castile and León, Spain. According to the 2004 census (INE), the municipality has a population of 31 inhabitants.
