= Sotillo del Rincón =

- Municipality
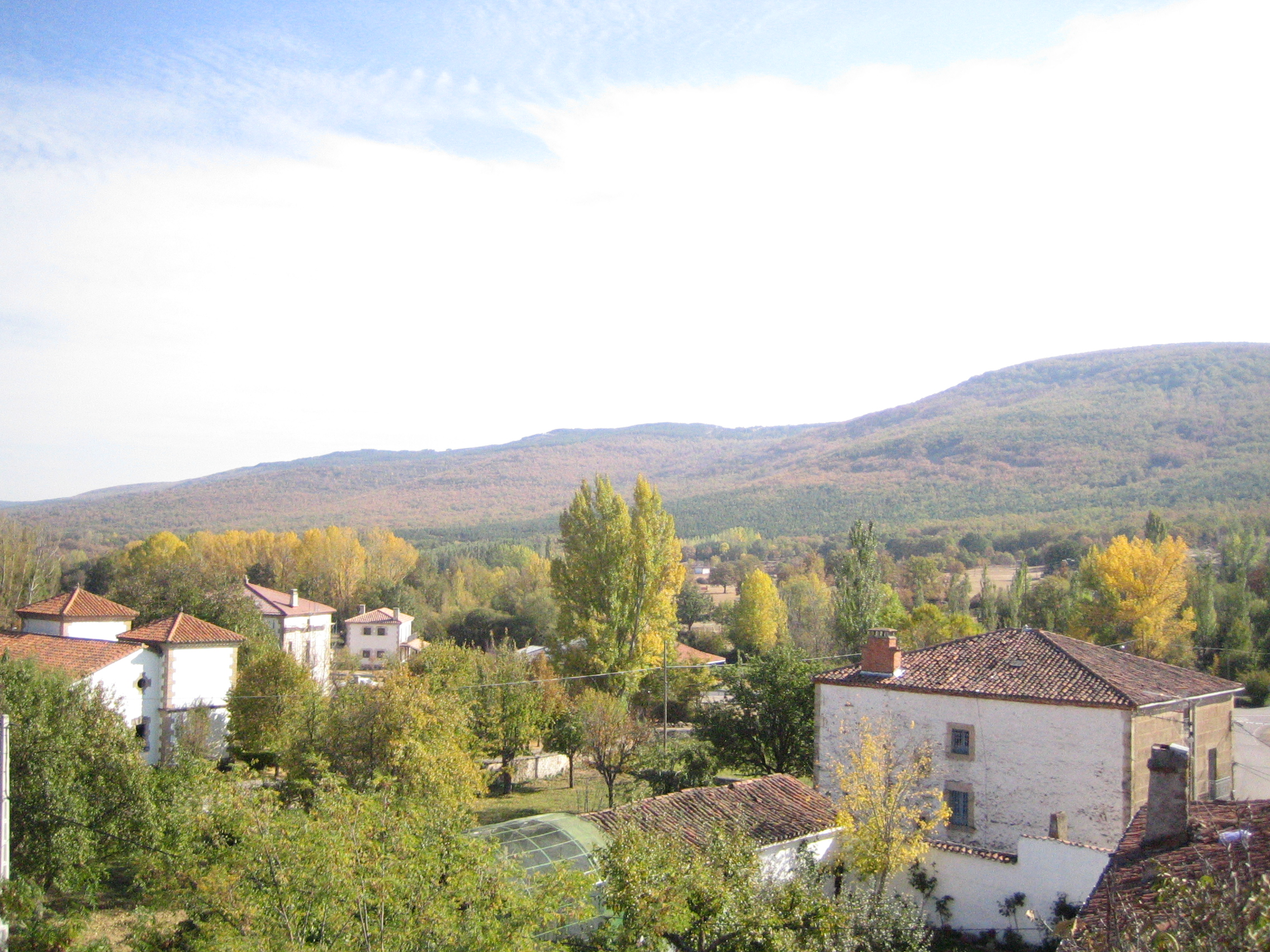
- View of Sotillo del Rincón Village

- Location in Spain. Sotillo del Rincón (Spain)
- Coordinates: 41°55′53″N 2°36′11″W
- Country: Spain
- Autonomous community: Castile and León
- Province: Soria
- Municipality: Sotillo del Rincón

Area
  - Total: 60 km^{2} (23 sq mi)

Population (2025-01-01)
  - Total: 171
  - Density: 2.8/km^{2} (7.4/sq mi)
- Time zone: UTC+1 (CET)
  - Summer (DST): UTC+2 (CEST)
- Website: Official website

Sotillo del Rincón is a municipality located in the province of Soria, Castile and León, Spain. According to the 2004 census (INE), the municipality has a population of 231 inhabitants.
