= Velilla de la Sierra =

- Municipality
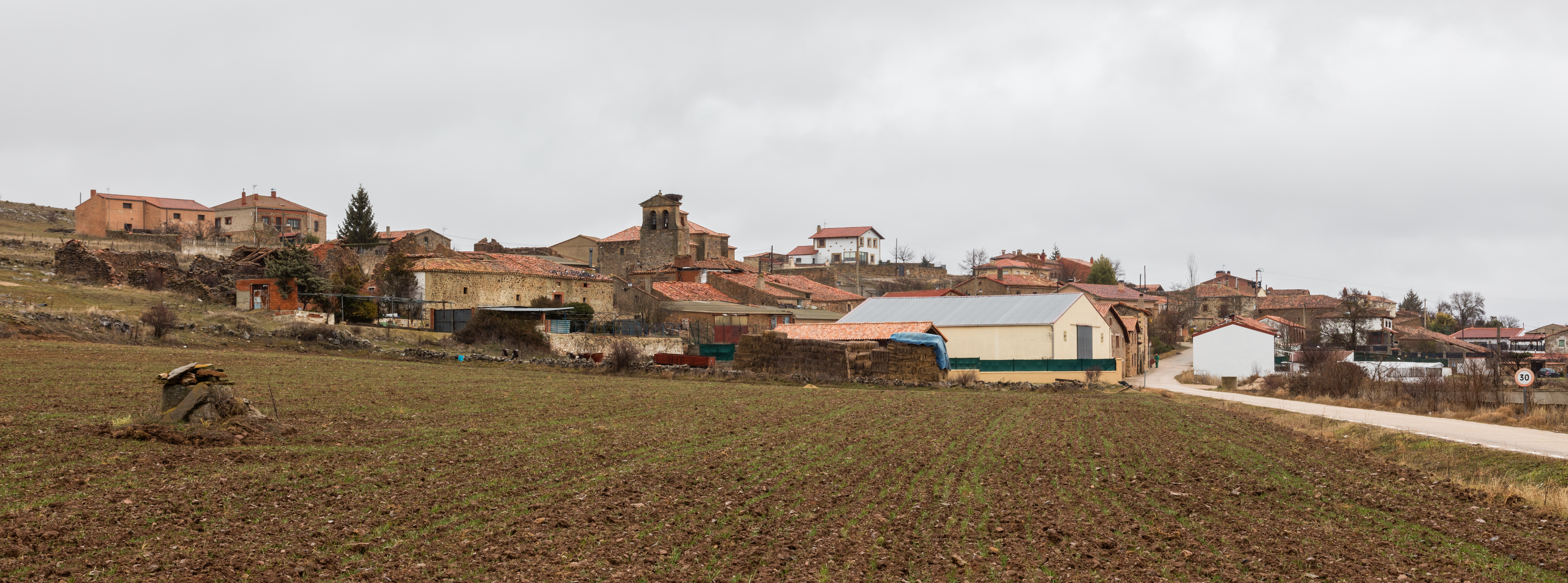
- View of Velilla de la Sierra

- Location in Spain. Velilla de la Sierra (Spain)
- Coordinates: 41°48′32″N 2°24′05″W
- Country: Spain
- Autonomous community: Castile and León
- Province: Soria
- Municipality: Velilla de la Sierra

Area
  - Total: 18.57 km^{2} (7.17 sq mi)
- Elevation: 1,033 m (3,389 ft)

Population (2025-01-01)
  - Total: 26
  - Density: 1.4/km^{2} (3.6/sq mi)
- Time zone: UTC+1 (CET)
  - Summer (DST): UTC+2 (CEST)
- Website: Official website

Velilla de la Sierra is a municipality located in the province of Soria, in the autonomous community of Castile and León, Spain.
