= Ausejo de la Sierra =

- Municipality
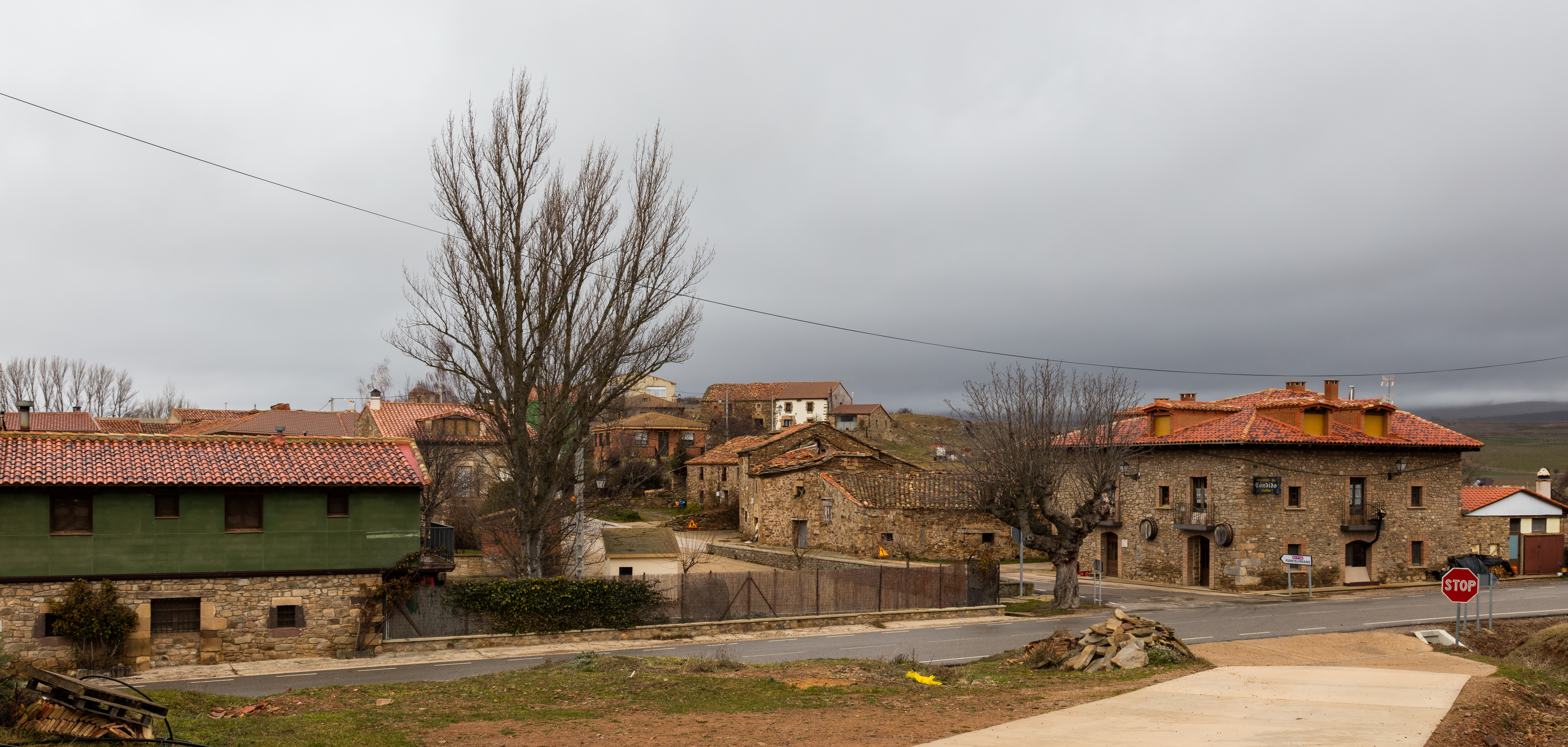

- Location in Spain. Ausejo de la Sierra (Spain)
- Country: Spain
- Autonomous community: Castile and León
- Province: Soria
- Municipality: Ausejo de la Sierra

Area
  - Total: 20.12 km^{2} (7.77 sq mi)
- Elevation: 1,096 m (3,596 ft)

Population (2025-01-01)
  - Total: 113
  - Density: 5.62/km^{2} (14.5/sq mi)
- Time zone: UTC+1 (CET)
  - Summer (DST): UTC+2 (CEST)
- Website: Official website

Ausejo de la Sierra is a municipality located in the province of Soria, Castile and León, Spain. According to the 2004 census (INE), the municipality had a population of 63 inhabitants.
