= Fuentearmegil =

- Municipality
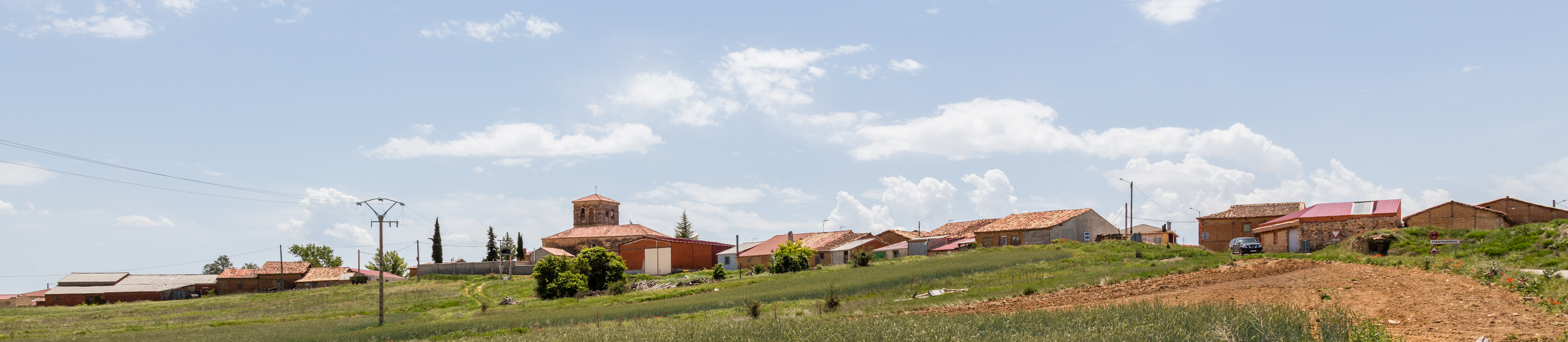
- View of Fuentearmegil, Soria, Spain

- Coat of arms

- Location in Spain. Fuentearmegil (Spain)
- Coordinates: 41°42′52″N 3°10′58″W
- Country: Spain
- Autonomous community: Castile and León
- Province: Soria
- Municipality: Fuentearmegil

Area
  - Total: 60 km^{2} (23 sq mi)

Population (2025-01-01)
  - Total: 148
  - Density: 2.5/km^{2} (6.4/sq mi)
- Time zone: UTC+1 (CET)
  - Summer (DST): UTC+2 (CEST)
- Website: Official website

Fuentearmegil is a municipality located in the province of Soria, Castile and León, Spain. According to the 2004 census (INE), the municipality has a population of 291 inhabitants.
