= Cirujales del Río =

- Municipality
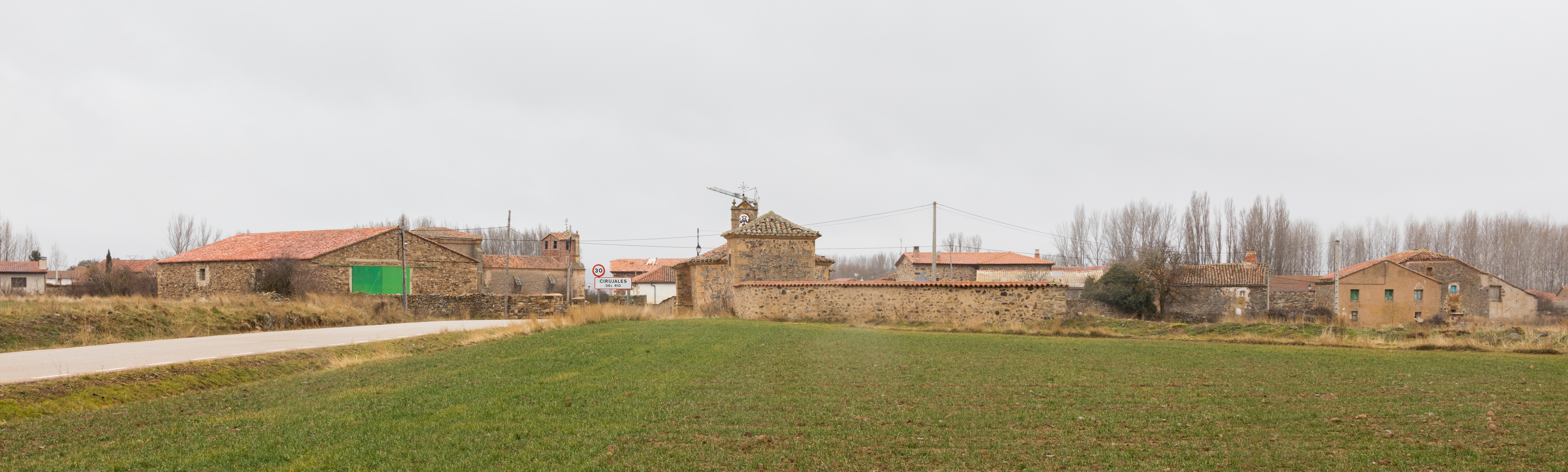
- Cirujales del Río Entrance

- Location in Spain. Cirujales del Río (Spain)
- Country: Spain
- Autonomous community: Castile and León
- Province: Soria
- Municipality: Cirujales del Río

Area
  - Total: 8 km^{2} (3.1 sq mi)
- Elevation: 1,067 m (3,501 ft)

Population (2025-01-01)
  - Total: 21
  - Density: 2.6/km^{2} (6.8/sq mi)
- Time zone: UTC+1 (CET)
  - Summer (DST): UTC+2 (CEST)
- Website: Official website

Cirujales del Río is a municipality located in the province of Soria, Castile and León, Spain. According to the 2004 census (INE), the municipality has a population of 39 inhabitants.
