= Miño de San Esteban =

Miño de San Esteban, Spain
- Municipality
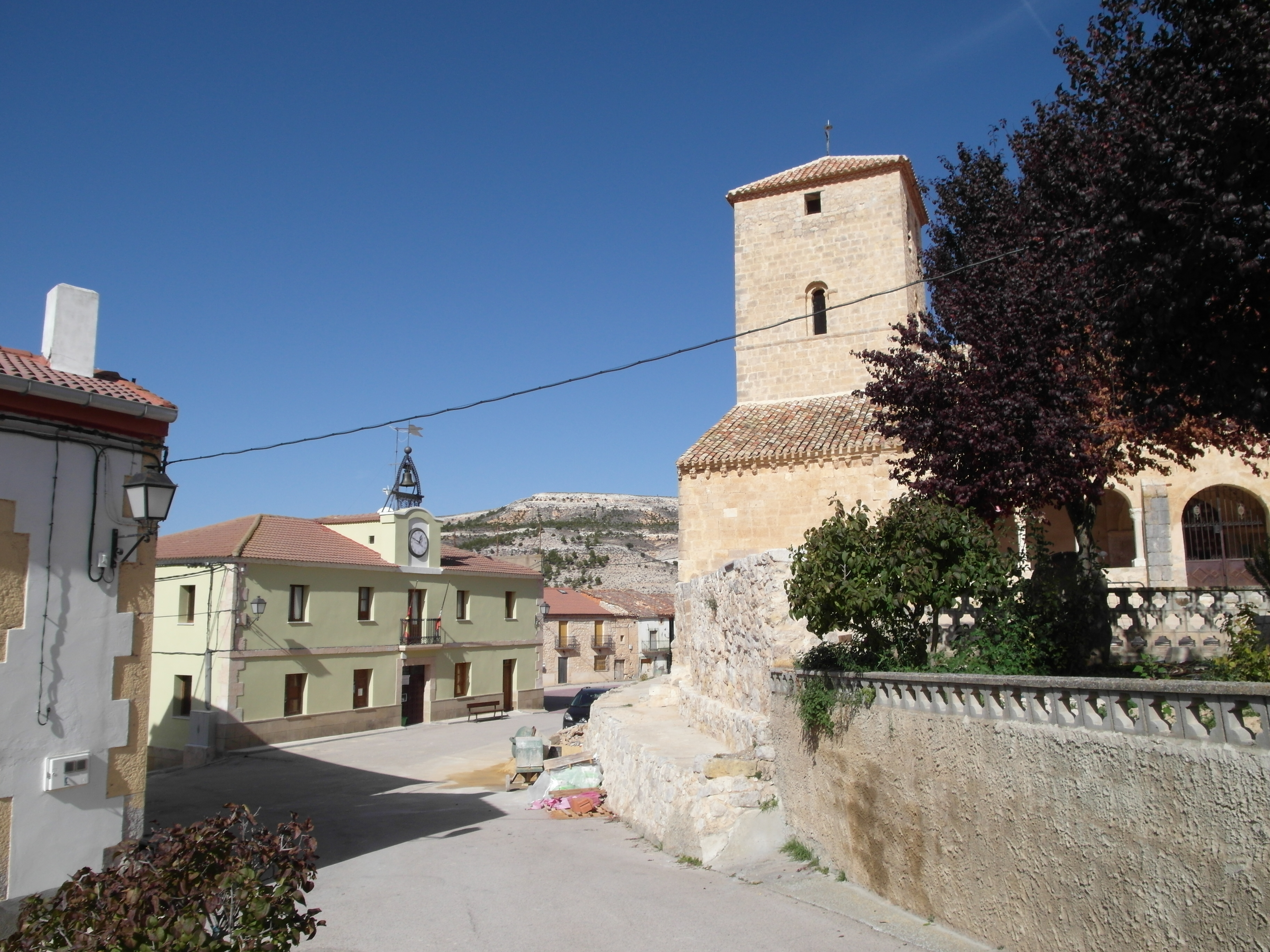
- Street of Miño de San Esteban Municipal

- Location in Spain. Miño de San Esteban, Spain (Spain)
- Coordinates: 41°32′09″N 3°20′43″W
- Country: Spain
- Autonomous community: Castile and León
- Province: Soria
- Municipality: Miño de San Esteban

Area
  - Total: 49 km^{2} (19 sq mi)
- Elevation: 942 m (3,091 ft)

Population (2025-01-01)
  - Total: 43
  - Density: 0.88/km^{2} (2.3/sq mi)
- Time zone: UTC+1 (CET)
  - Summer (DST): UTC+2 (CEST)
- Website: Official website

Miño de San Esteban is a municipality located in the province of Soria, Castile and León, Spain. According to the 2004 census (INE), the municipality had a population of 80 inhabitants.
