= Quiñonería =

- Municipality
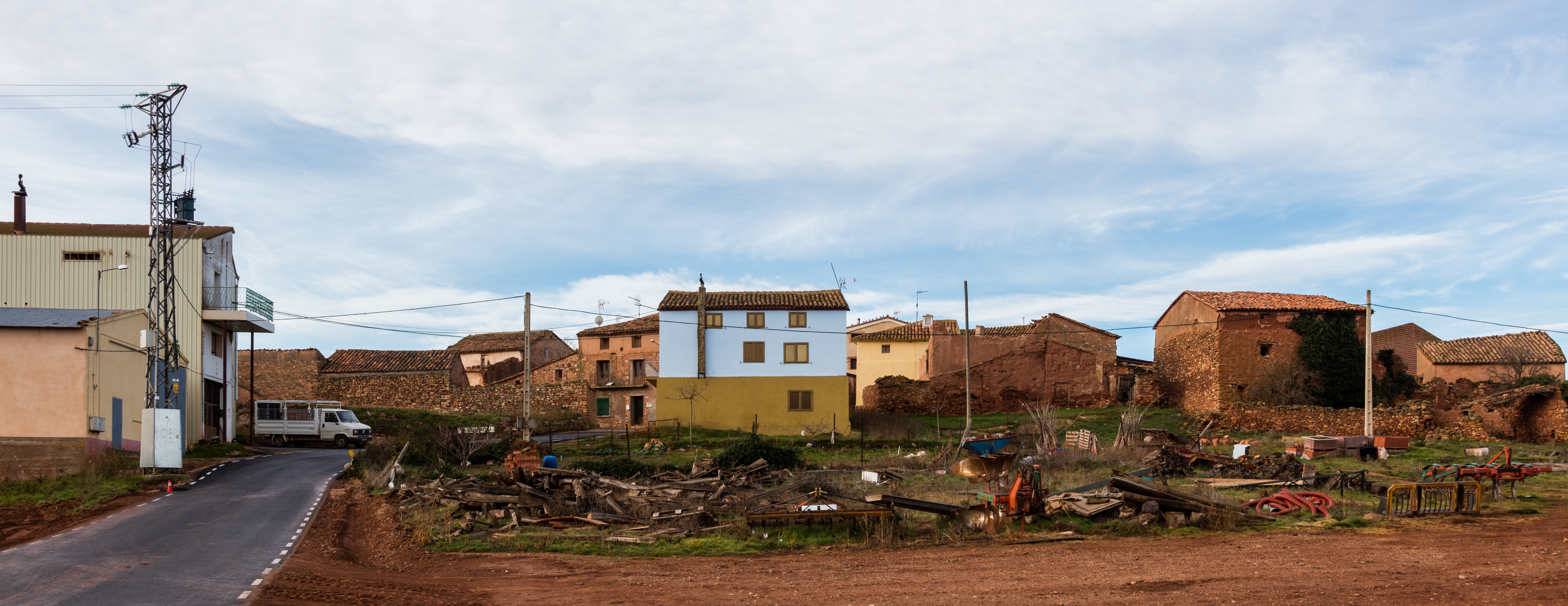
- View of Quiñonería, Soria, Spain

- Location in Spain. Quiñonería (Spain)
- Coordinates: 41°32′14″N 2°03′27″W
- Country: Spain
- Autonomous community: Castile and León
- Province: Soria
- Municipality: Quiñonería

Area
  - Total: 38 km^{2} (15 sq mi)

Population (2025-01-01)
  - Total: 10
  - Density: 0.26/km^{2} (0.68/sq mi)
- Time zone: UTC+1 (CET)
  - Summer (DST): UTC+2 (CEST)
- Website: Official website

Quiñonería is a municipality located in the province of Soria, Castile and León, Spain. According to the 2004 census (INE), the municipality has a human population of 8.
