= Portillo de Soria =

- Municipality
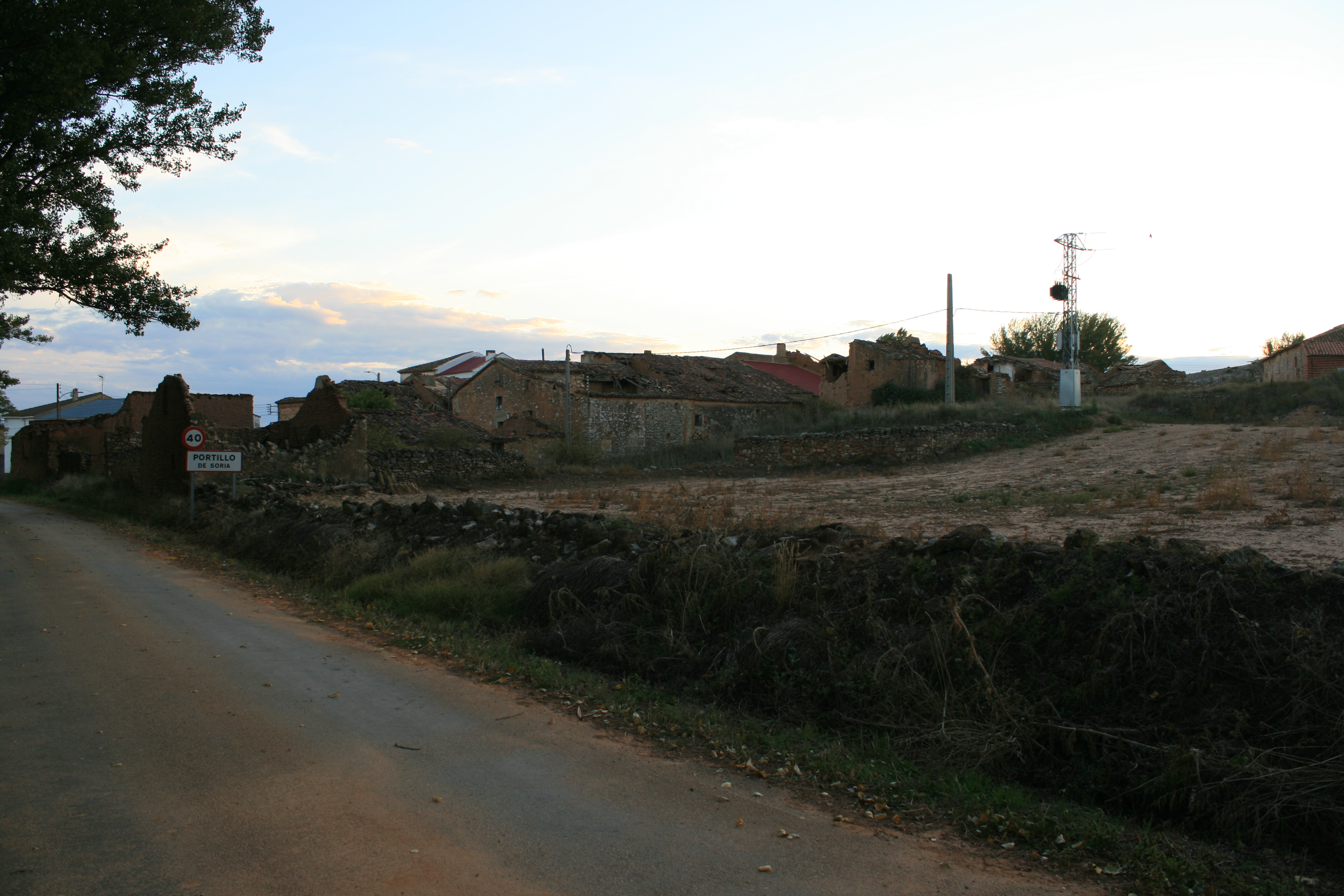
- Sunset, Portillo de Soria Entrance

- Location in Spain. Portillo de Soria (Spain)
- Coordinates: 41°38′07″N 2°07′16″W
- Country: Spain
- Autonomous community: Castile and León
- Province: Soria
- Municipality: Portillo de Soria

Area
  - Total: 12 km^{2} (4.6 sq mi)

Population (2025-01-01)
  - Total: 11
  - Density: 0.92/km^{2} (2.4/sq mi)
- Time zone: UTC+1 (CET)
  - Summer (DST): UTC+2 (CEST)
- Website: Official website

Portillo de Soria is a municipality located in the province of Soria, Castile and León, Spain. According to the 2004 census (INE), the municipality has a population of 18 inhabitants.
