= Cañamaque =

- Municipality
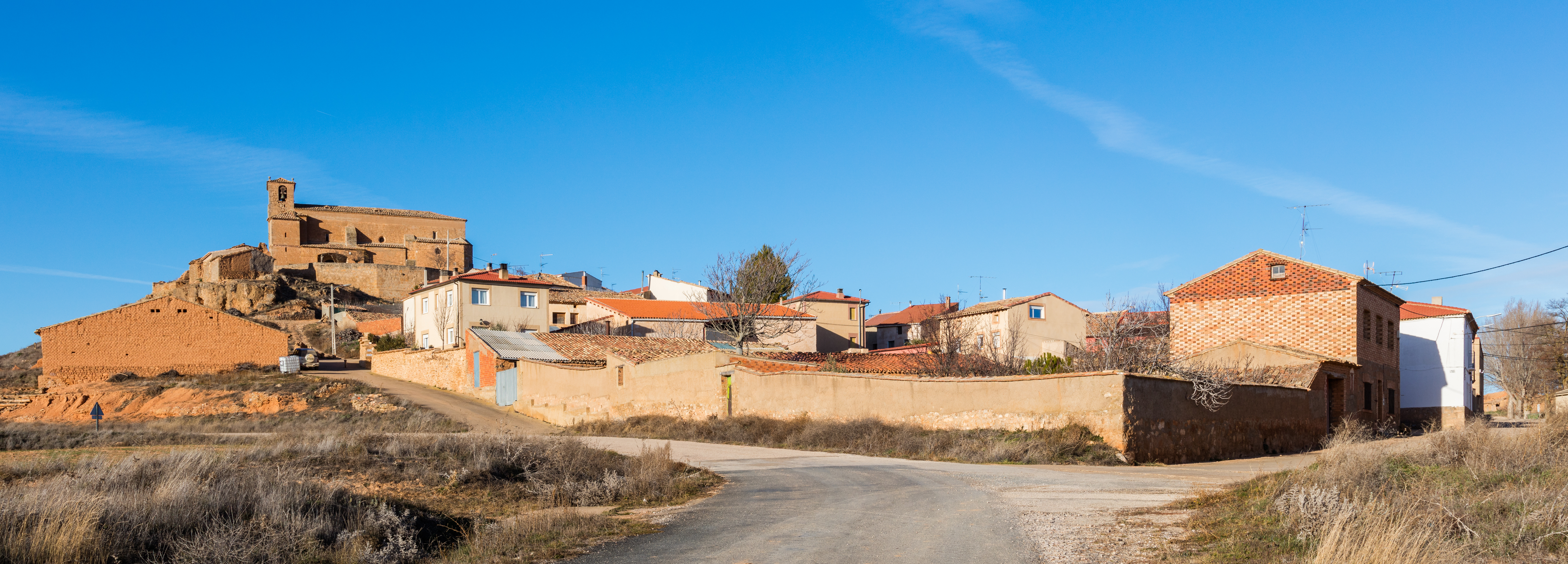
- Cañamaque, Soria, Spain

- Location in Spain. Cañamaque (Spain)
- Country: Spain
- Autonomous community: Castile and León
- Province: Soria
- Municipality: Cañamaque

Area
  - Total: 22 km^{2} (8.5 sq mi)

Population (2025-01-01)
  - Total: 29
  - Density: 1.3/km^{2} (3.4/sq mi)
- Time zone: UTC+1 (CET)
  - Summer (DST): UTC+2 (CEST)

Cañamaque is a municipality located in the province of Soria, Castile and León, Spain. According to the 2004 census (INE), the municipality has a population of 42 inhabitants.
