= Torreblacos =

- Municipality
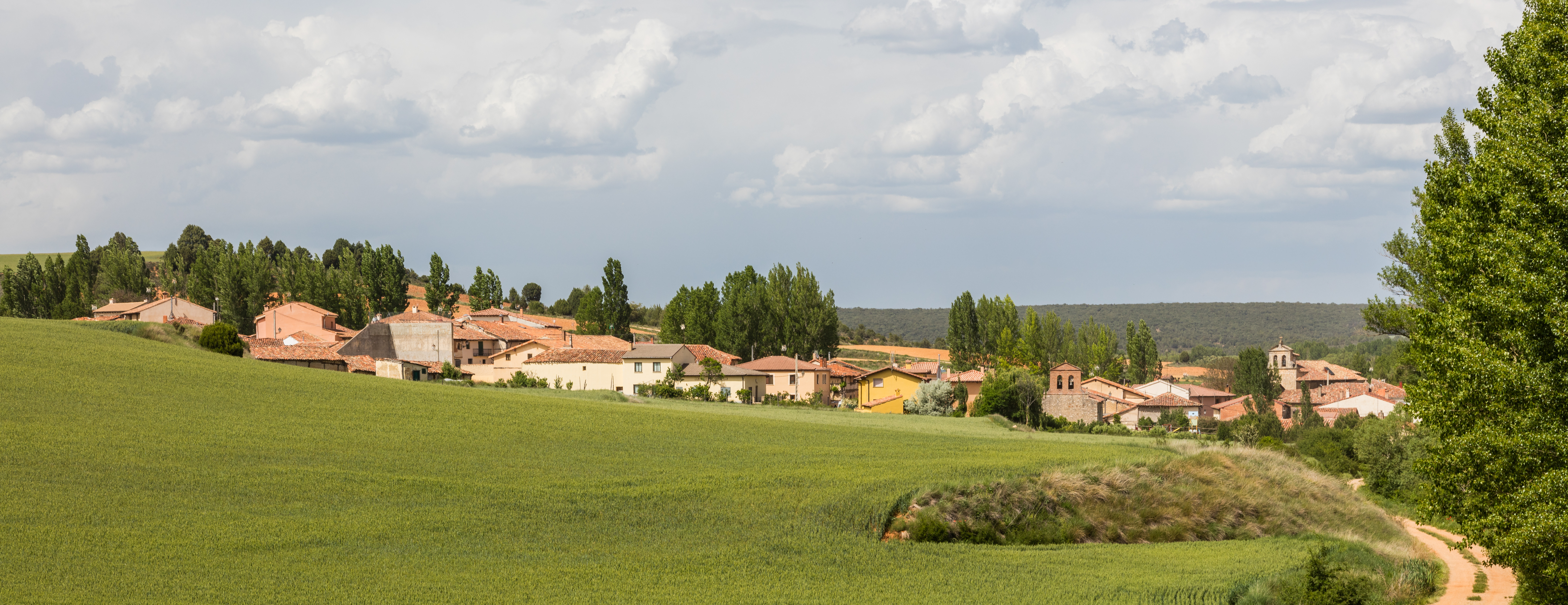
- View of Torreblacos

- Location in Spain. Torreblacos (Spain)
- Coordinates: 41°40′09″N 2°52′38″W
- Country: Spain
- Autonomous community: Castile and León
- Province: Soria
- Municipality: Torreblacos

Area
  - Total: 17 km^{2} (6.6 sq mi)

Population (2021)
  - Total: 26
  - Density: 1.5/km^{2} (4.0/sq mi)
- Time zone: UTC+1 (CET)
  - Summer (DST): UTC+2 (CEST)
- Website: Official website

Torreblacos is a municipality located in the province of Soria, Castile and León, Spain. According to the 2021 census (INE), the municipality had a population of 26 inhabitants.
