= Talveila =

- Municipality
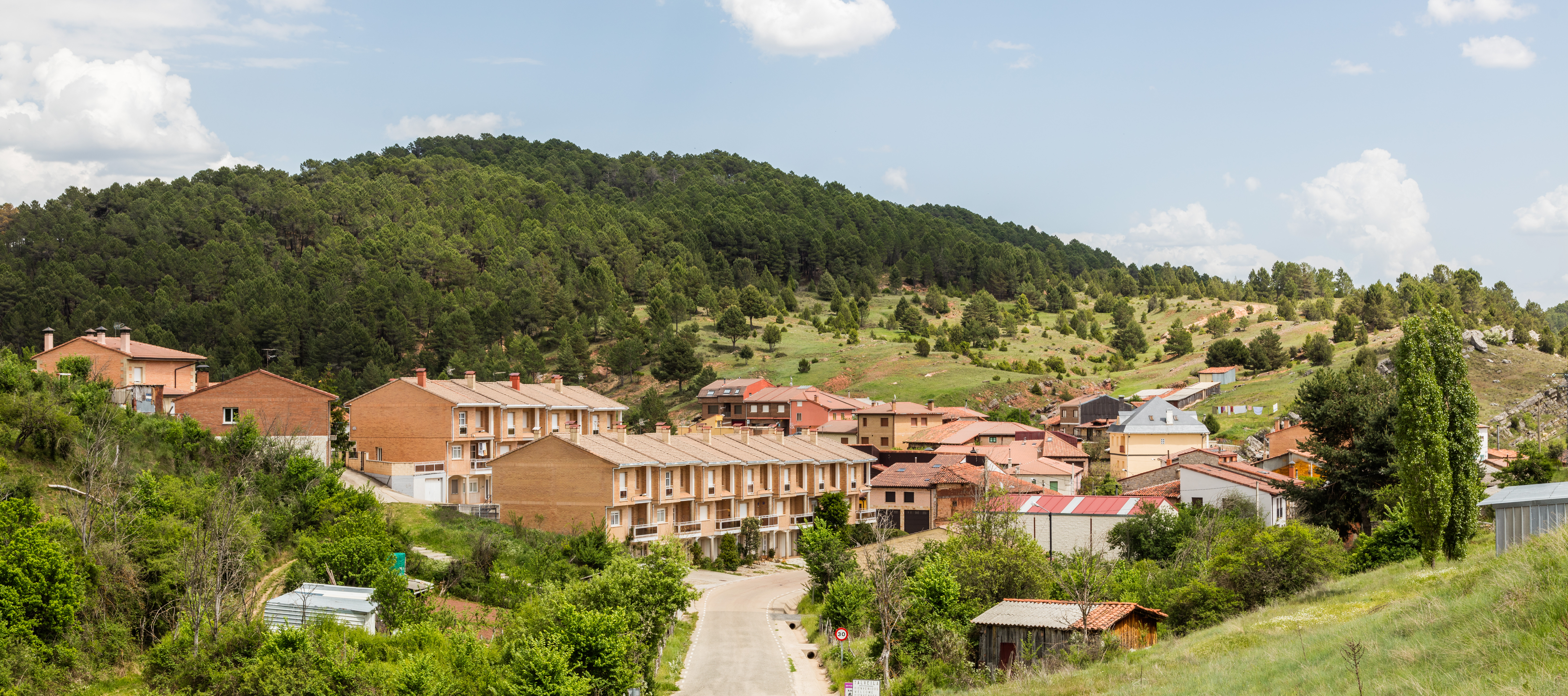

- Location in Spain. Talveila (Spain)
- Coordinates: 41°47′02″N 2°58′00″W
- Country: Spain
- Autonomous community: Castile and León
- Province: Soria
- Municipality: Talveila

Area
  - Total: 52 km^{2} (20 sq mi)

Population (2025-01-01)
  - Total: 105
  - Density: 2.0/km^{2} (5.2/sq mi)
- Time zone: UTC+1 (CET)
  - Summer (DST): UTC+2 (CEST)
- Website: Official website

Talveila is a municipality located in the Spanish province of Soria, Castile and León. According to the 2004 census (INE), the municipality has a population of 186 inhabitants.
