= Cabrejas del Pinar =

- Municipality
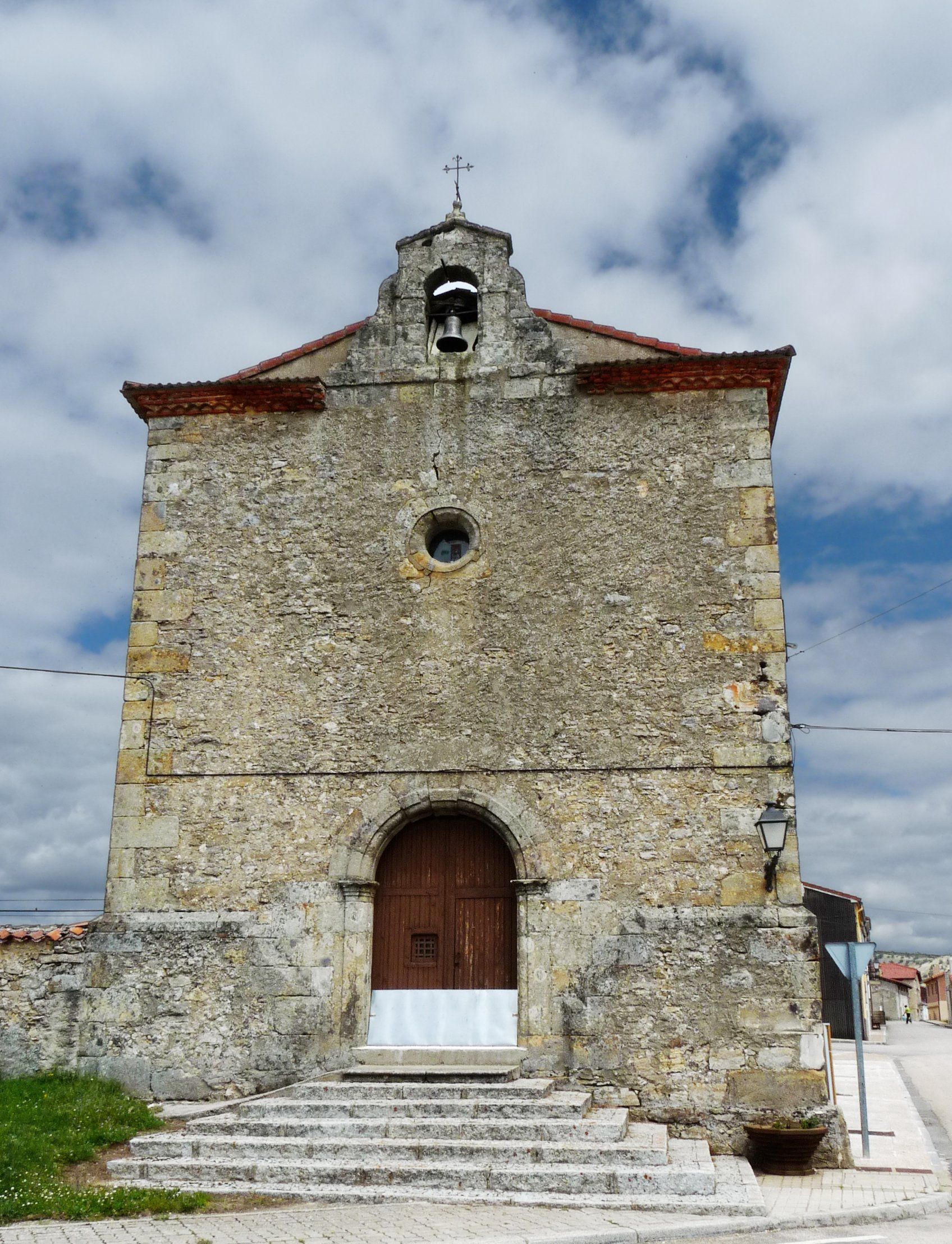
- Hermitage of Santa Ana in Cabrejas del Pinar

- Coat of arms

- Location in Spain. Cabrejas del Pinar (Spain)
- Country: Spain
- Autonomous community: Castile and León
- Province: Soria
- Municipality: Cabrejas del Pinar

Area
  - Total: 124 km^{2} (48 sq mi)

Population (2025-01-01)
  - Total: 288
  - Density: 2.32/km^{2} (6.02/sq mi)
- Time zone: UTC+1 (CET)
  - Summer (DST): UTC+2 (CEST)
- Website: Official website

Cabrejas del Pinar is a municipality located in the province of Soria, Castile and León, Spain. According to the 2004 census (INE), the municipality has a population of 485 inhabitants.
