= Liceras =

- Municipality
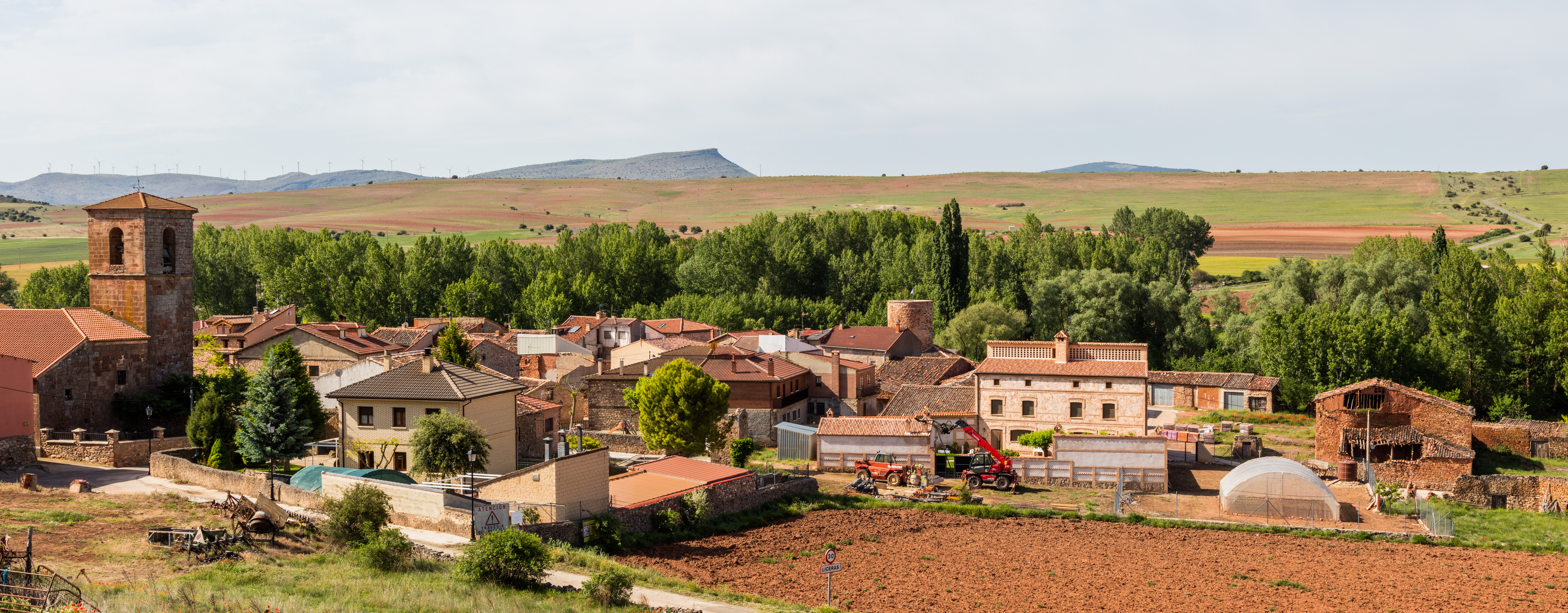
- View of Liceras. Soria, Spain

- Flag Coat of arms

- Location in Spain. Liceras (Spain)
- Coordinates: 41°22′45″N 3°14′35″W
- Country: Spain
- Autonomous community: Castile and León
- Province: Soria
- Municipality: Liceras

Area
  - Total: 24 km^{2} (9.3 sq mi)

Population (2025-01-01)
  - Total: 49
  - Density: 2.0/km^{2} (5.3/sq mi)
- Time zone: UTC+1 (CET)
  - Summer (DST): UTC+2 (CEST)
- Website: Official website

Liceras is a municipality located in the province of Soria, Castile and León, Spain. According to the 2004 census (INE), the municipality has a population of 61 inhabitants.
