= Reznos =

- Municipality
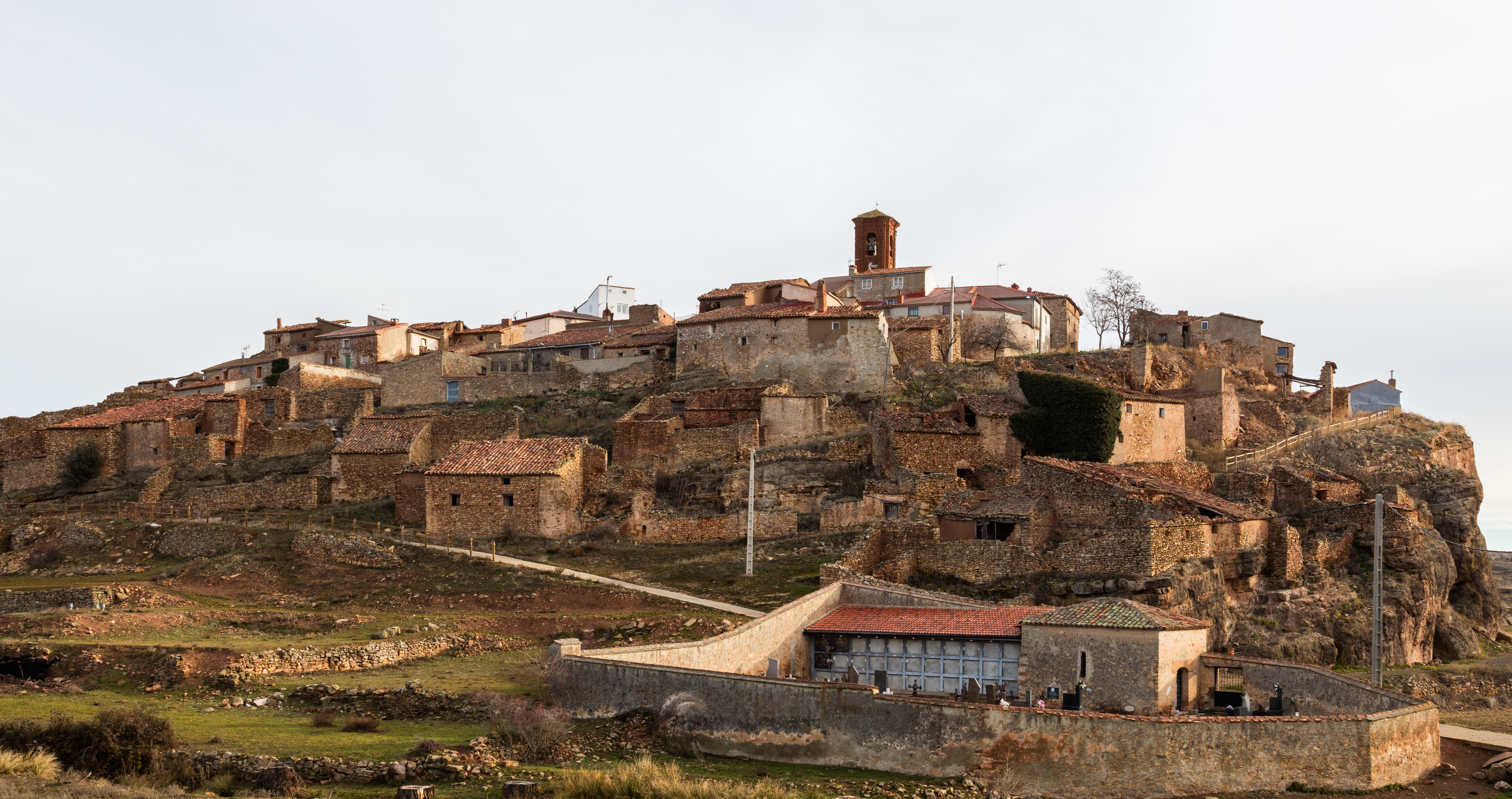
- View of Reznos, Soria, Spain

- Location in Spain. Reznos (Spain)
- Coordinates: 41°35′29″N 2°01′37″W
- Country: Spain
- Autonomous community: Castile and León
- Province: Soria
- Municipality: Reznos

Area
  - Total: 20 km^{2} (7.7 sq mi)

Population (2025-01-01)
  - Total: 21
  - Density: 1.0/km^{2} (2.7/sq mi)
- Time zone: UTC+1 (CET)
  - Summer (DST): UTC+2 (CEST)
- Website: Official website

Reznos is a municipality located in the province of Soria, Castile and León, Spain. According to the 2004 census (INE), the municipality has a population of 43 inhabitants.
