= Cihuela =

- Municipality
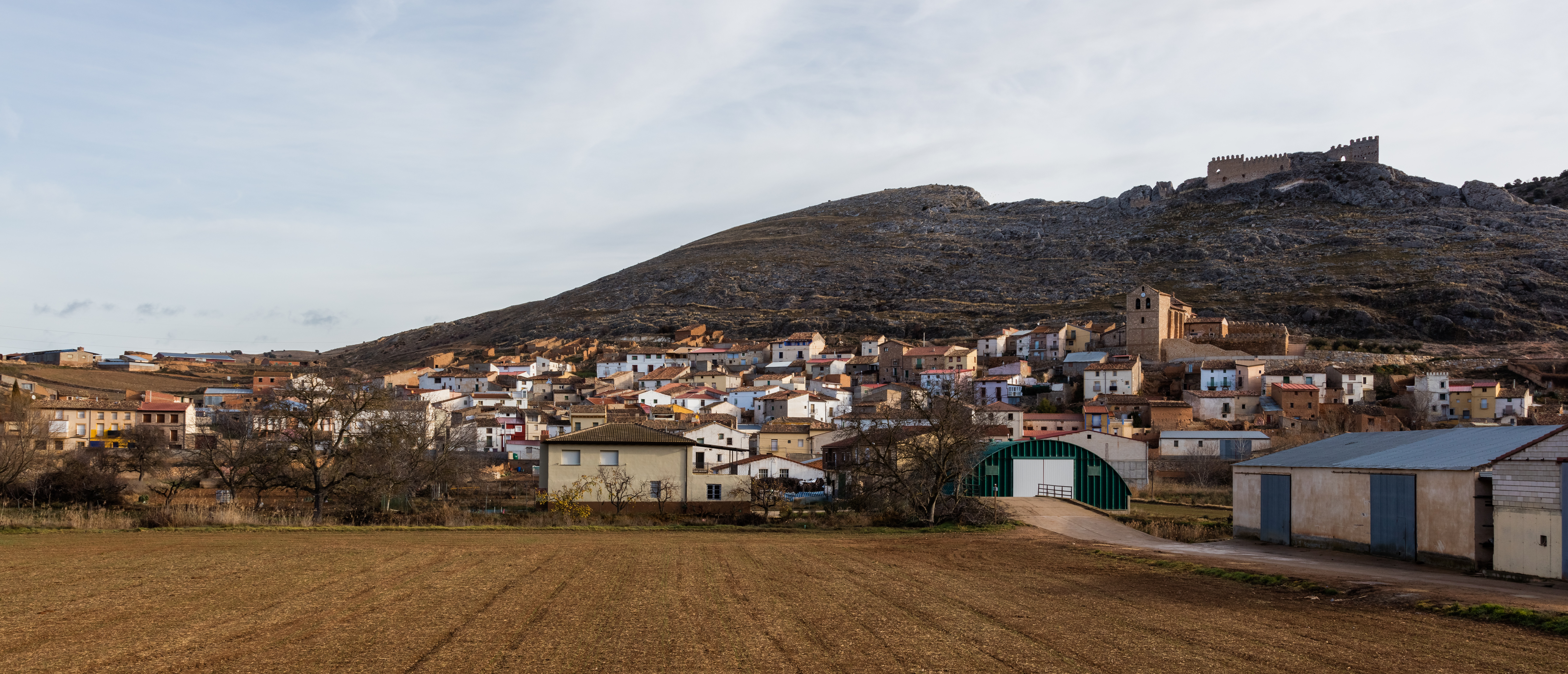
- View of Cihuela, Soria, Spain

- Flag Coat of arms

- Location in Spain. Cihuela (Spain)
- Country: Spain
- Autonomous community: Castile and León
- Province: Soria
- Municipality: Cihuela

Area
  - Total: 34 km^{2} (13 sq mi)

Population (2025-01-01)
  - Total: 35
  - Density: 1.0/km^{2} (2.7/sq mi)
- Time zone: UTC+1 (CET)
  - Summer (DST): UTC+2 (CEST)
- Website: Official website

Cihuela is a municipality located in the province of Soria, Castile and León, Spain. According to the 2004 census (INE), the municipality has a population of 82 inhabitants.
