= Estepa de San Juan =

- Municipality
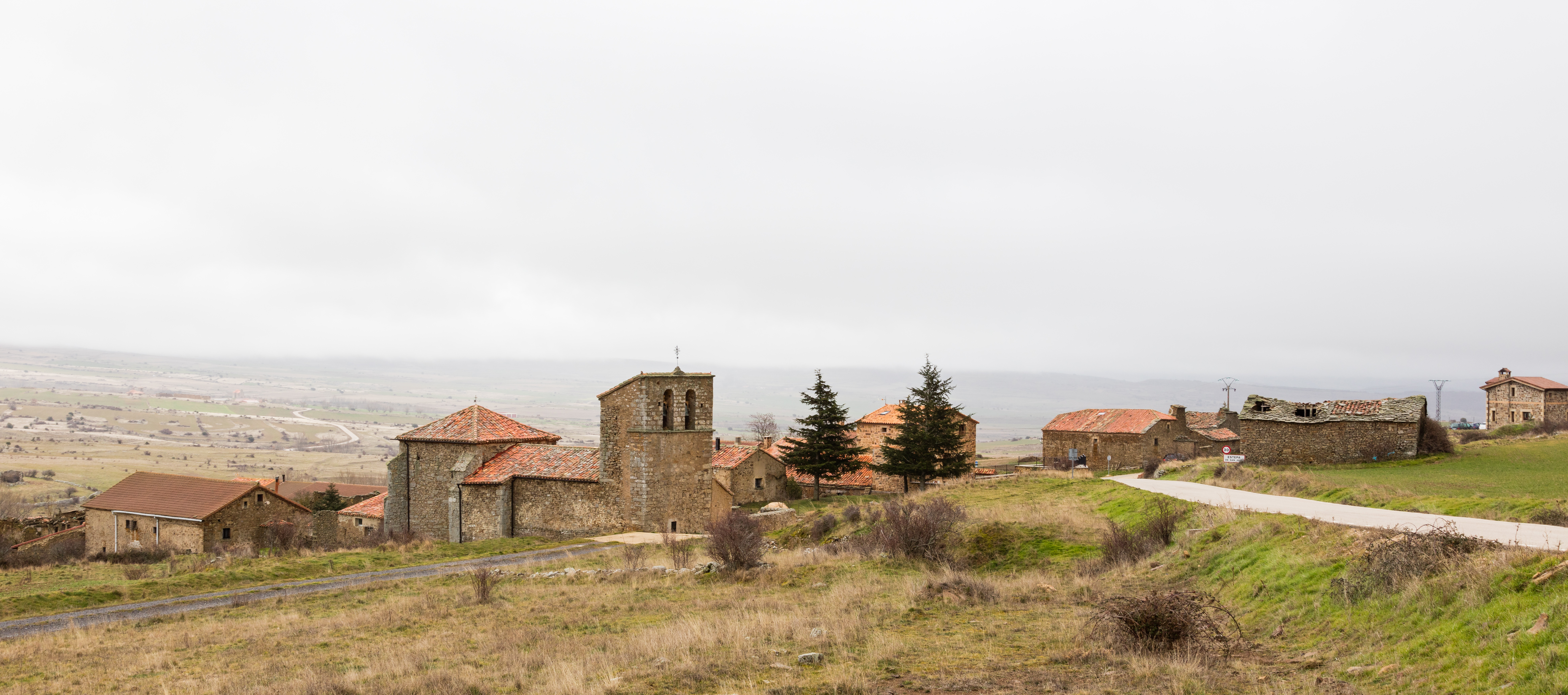
- View of Estepa de San Juan

- Location in Spain. Estepa de San Juan (Spain)
- Coordinates: 41°55′35″N 2°20′01″W
- Country: Spain
- Autonomous community: Castile and León
- Province: Soria
- Municipality: Estepa de San Juan

Area
  - Total: 10 km^{2} (3.9 sq mi)
- Elevation: 1,254 m (4,114 ft)

Population (2025-01-01)
  - Total: 13
  - Density: 1.3/km^{2} (3.4/sq mi)
- Time zone: UTC+1 (CET)
  - Summer (DST): UTC+2 (CEST)
- Website: Official website

Estepa de San Juan is a municipality located in the province of Soria, Castile and León, Spain. According to the 2004 census (INE), the municipality has a population of 12 inhabitants.
