= Pinilla del Campo =

- Municipality
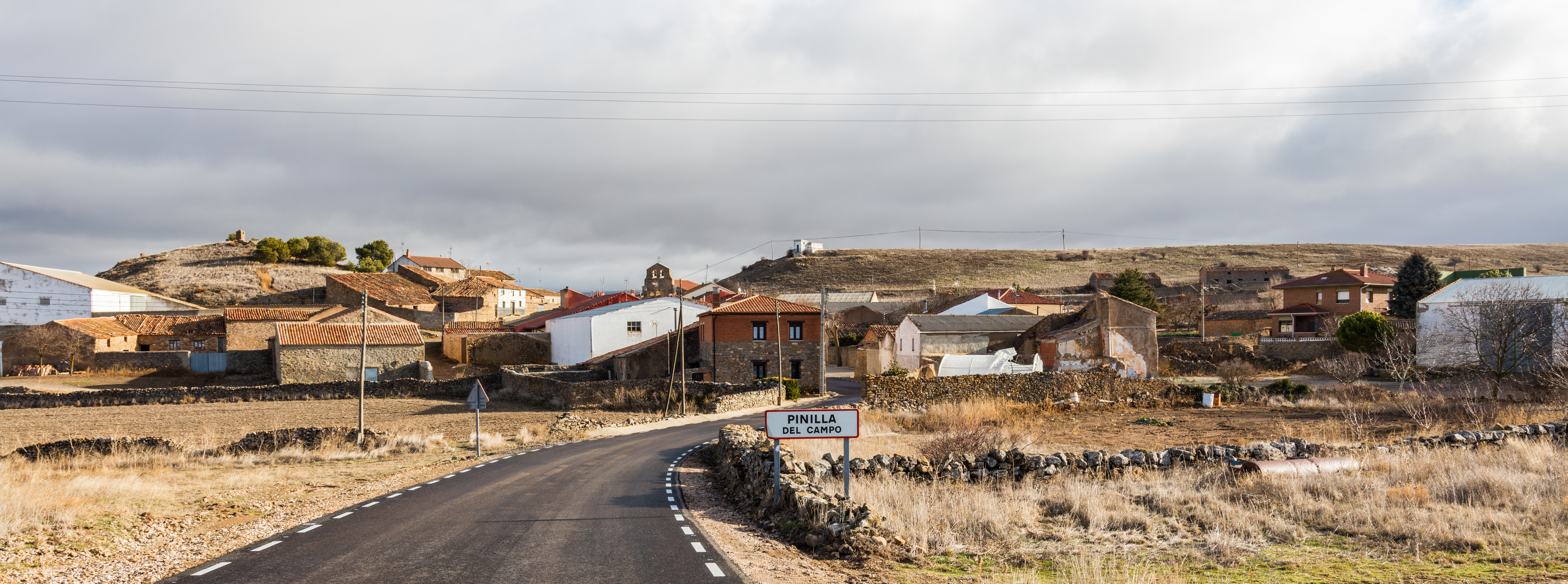
- Entrance to Pinilla del Campo Village

- Location in Spain. Pinilla del Campo (Spain)
- Coordinates: 41°43′02″N 2°05′00″W
- Country: Spain
- Autonomous community: Castile and León
- Province: Soria
- Municipality: Pinilla del Campo

Area
  - Total: 19 km^{2} (7.3 sq mi)

Population (2025-01-01)
  - Total: 17
  - Density: 0.89/km^{2} (2.3/sq mi)
- Time zone: UTC+1 (CET)
  - Summer (DST): UTC+2 (CEST)
- Website: Official website

Pinilla del Campo is a municipality located in the province of Soria, Castile and León, Spain. According to the 2004 census (INE), the municipality has a population of 21 inhabitants.
