= Torlengua =

- Municipality
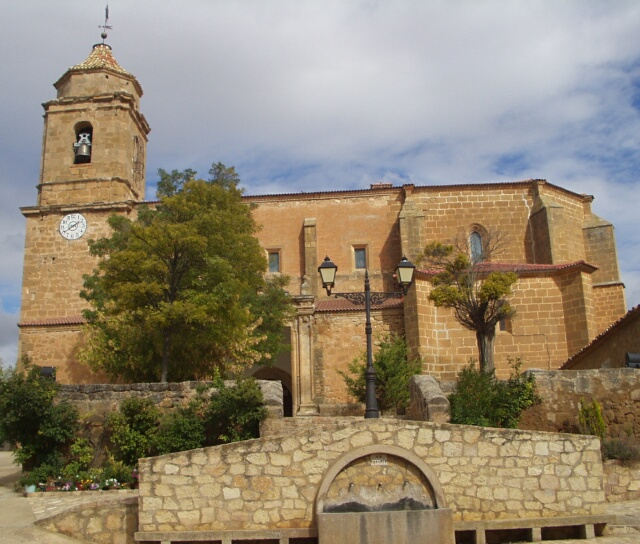
- Parish church

- Coat of arms

- Location in Spain. Torlengua (Spain)
- Coordinates: 41°27′13″N 2°09′46″W
- Country: Spain
- Autonomous community: Castile and León
- Province: Soria
- Municipality: Torlengua

Area
  - Total: 41 km^{2} (16 sq mi)

Population (2025-01-01)
  - Total: 43
  - Density: 1.0/km^{2} (2.7/sq mi)
- Time zone: UTC+1 (CET)
  - Summer (DST): UTC+2 (CEST)
- Website: Official website

Torlengua is a municipality located in the province of Soria, Castile and León, Spain. According to the 2004 census (INE), the municipality had a population of 97 inhabitants.
