= Carabantes =

- Municipality
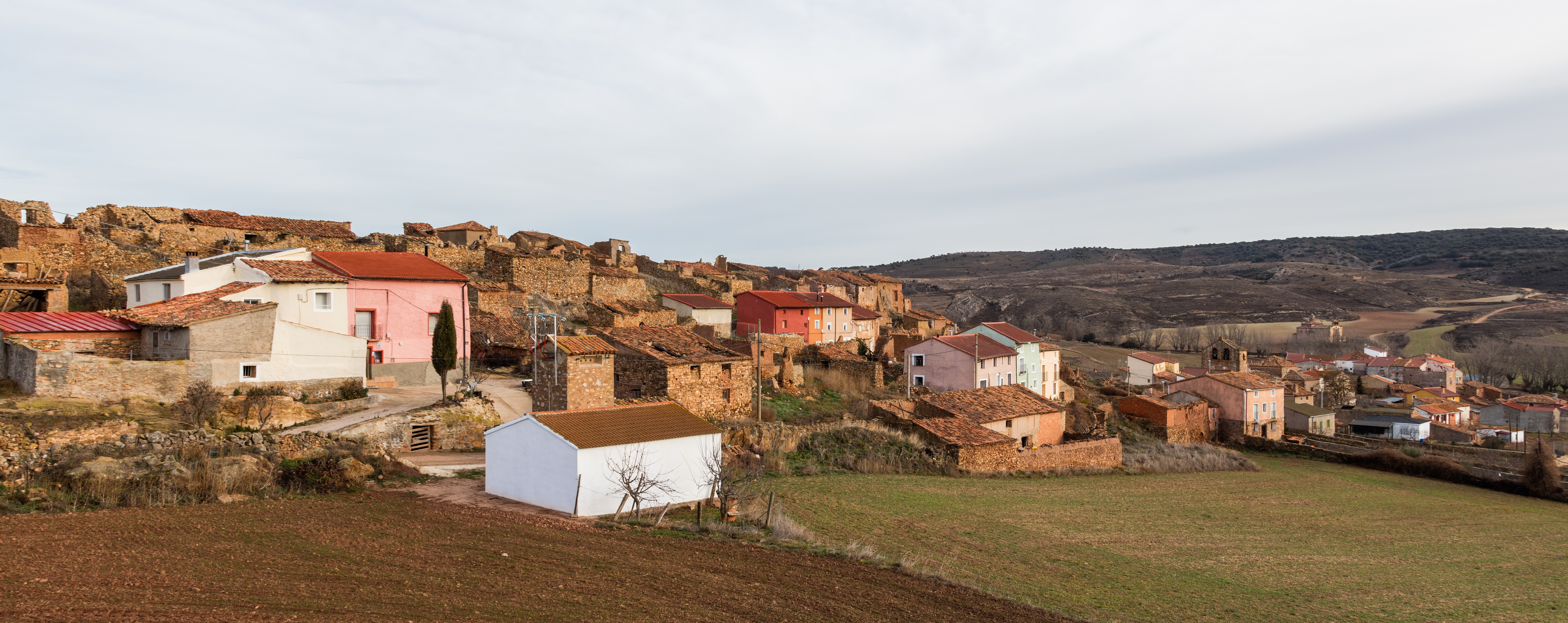

- Location in Spain. Carabantes (Spain)
- Country: Spain
- Autonomous community: Castile and León
- Province: Soria
- Municipality: Carabantes

Area
  - Total: 16 km^{2} (6.2 sq mi)
- Elevation: 979 m (3,212 ft)

Population (2025-01-01)
  - Total: 21
  - Density: 1.3/km^{2} (3.4/sq mi)
- Time zone: UTC+1 (CET)
  - Summer (DST): UTC+2 (CEST)
- Website: Official website

Carabantes is a municipality located in the province of Soria, Castile and León, Spain. According to the 2004 census (INE), the municipality has a population of 33 inhabitants.

The noble family of Caravantes is from this region. Descendants of this family reside in North-West Mexico, California, and the Puget Sound area of Washington State in the United States of America. The Caravantes family is known for founding a winery, and for their hospitality.
