= La Losilla =

- Municipality
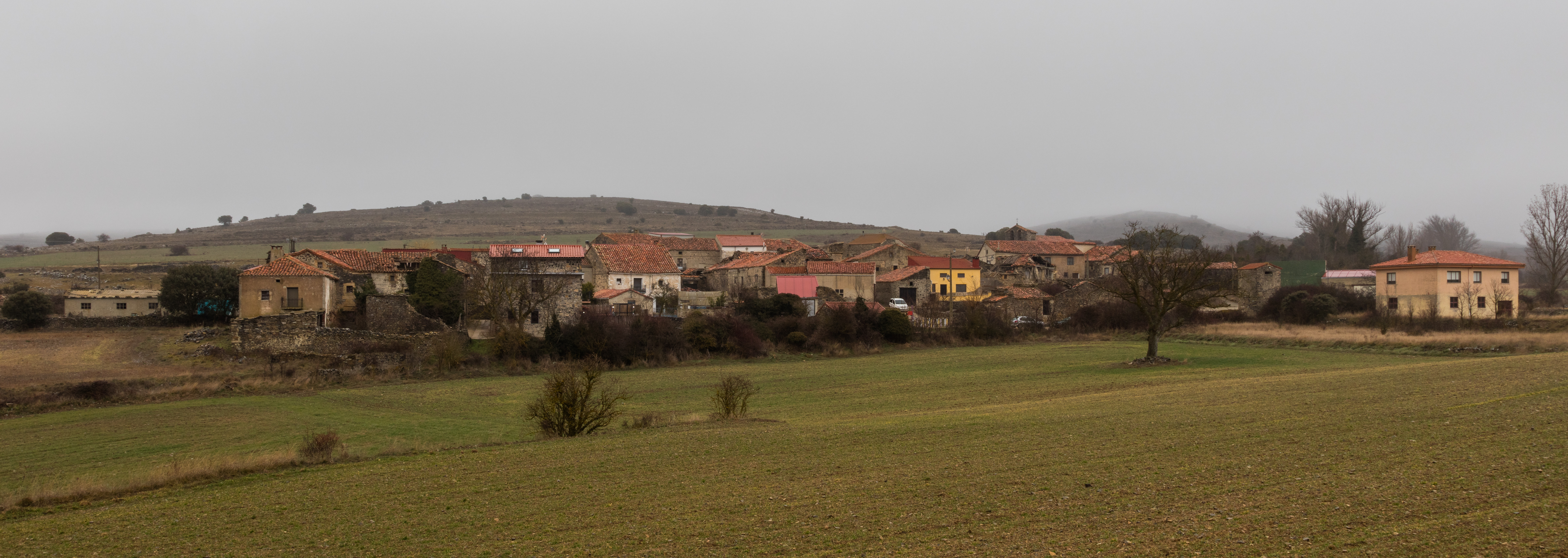
- View of La Losilla

- Location in Spain. La Losilla (Spain)
- Coordinates: 41°52′21″N 2°16′43″W
- Country: Spain
- Autonomous community: Castile and León
- Province: Soria
- Municipality: La Losilla

Area
  - Total: 7.90 km^{2} (3.05 sq mi)
- Elevation: 1,174 m (3,852 ft)

Population (2025-01-01)
  - Total: 12
  - Density: 1.5/km^{2} (3.9/sq mi)
- Time zone: UTC+1 (CET)
  - Summer (DST): UTC+2 (CEST)
- Website: Official website

La Losilla is a municipality located in the province of Soria, Castile and León, Spain. According to the 2004 census (INE), the municipality has a population of 17 inhabitants.
