= Tejado =

- Municipality
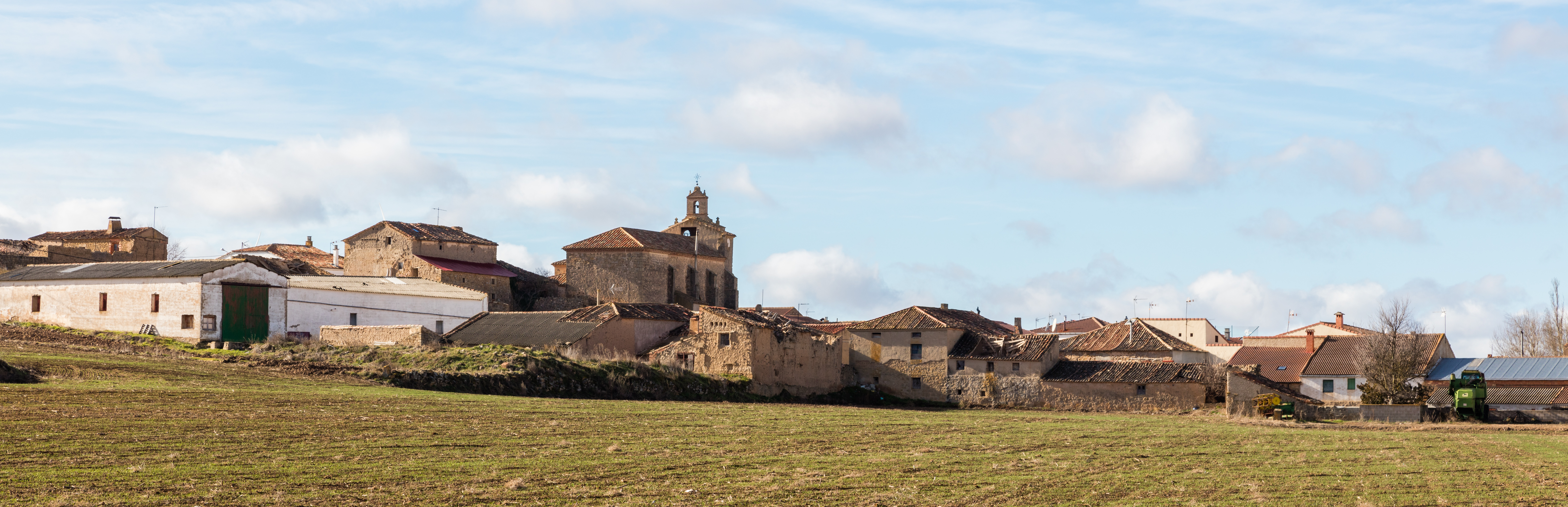

- Location in Spain. Tejado (Spain)
- Coordinates: 41°35′20″N 2°16′01″W
- Country: Spain
- Autonomous community: Castile and León
- Province: Soria
- Municipality: Tejado

Area
  - Total: 77 km^{2} (30 sq mi)

Population (2025-01-01)
  - Total: 100
  - Density: 1.3/km^{2} (3.4/sq mi)
- Time zone: UTC+1 (CET)
  - Summer (DST): UTC+2 (CEST)
- Website: Official website

Tejado is a municipality located in the province of Soria, Castile and León, Spain. According to the 2004 census (INE), the municipality has a population of 185 inhabitants.
