= Fuentestrún =

- Municipality
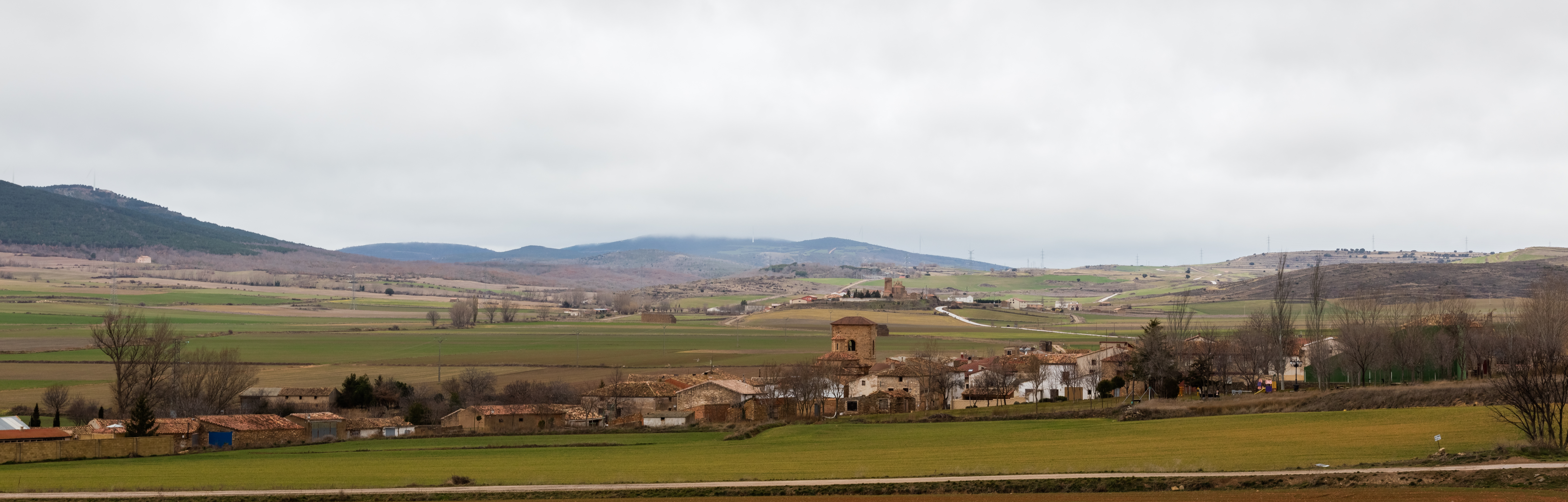

- Location in Spain. Fuentestrún (Spain)
- Coordinates: 42°52′28″N 2°04′54″W
- Country: Spain
- Autonomous community: Castile and León
- Province: Soria
- Municipality: Fuentestrún

Area
  - Total: 9 km^{2} (3.5 sq mi)

Population (2025-01-01)
  - Total: 55
  - Density: 6.1/km^{2} (16/sq mi)
- Time zone: UTC+1 (CET)
  - Summer (DST): UTC+2 (CEST)
- Website: Official website

Fuentestrún is a municipality located in the province of Soria, Castile and León, Spain. According to the 2004 census (INE), the municipality had a population of 78 inhabitants.
