= Muriel de la Fuente =

- Municipality
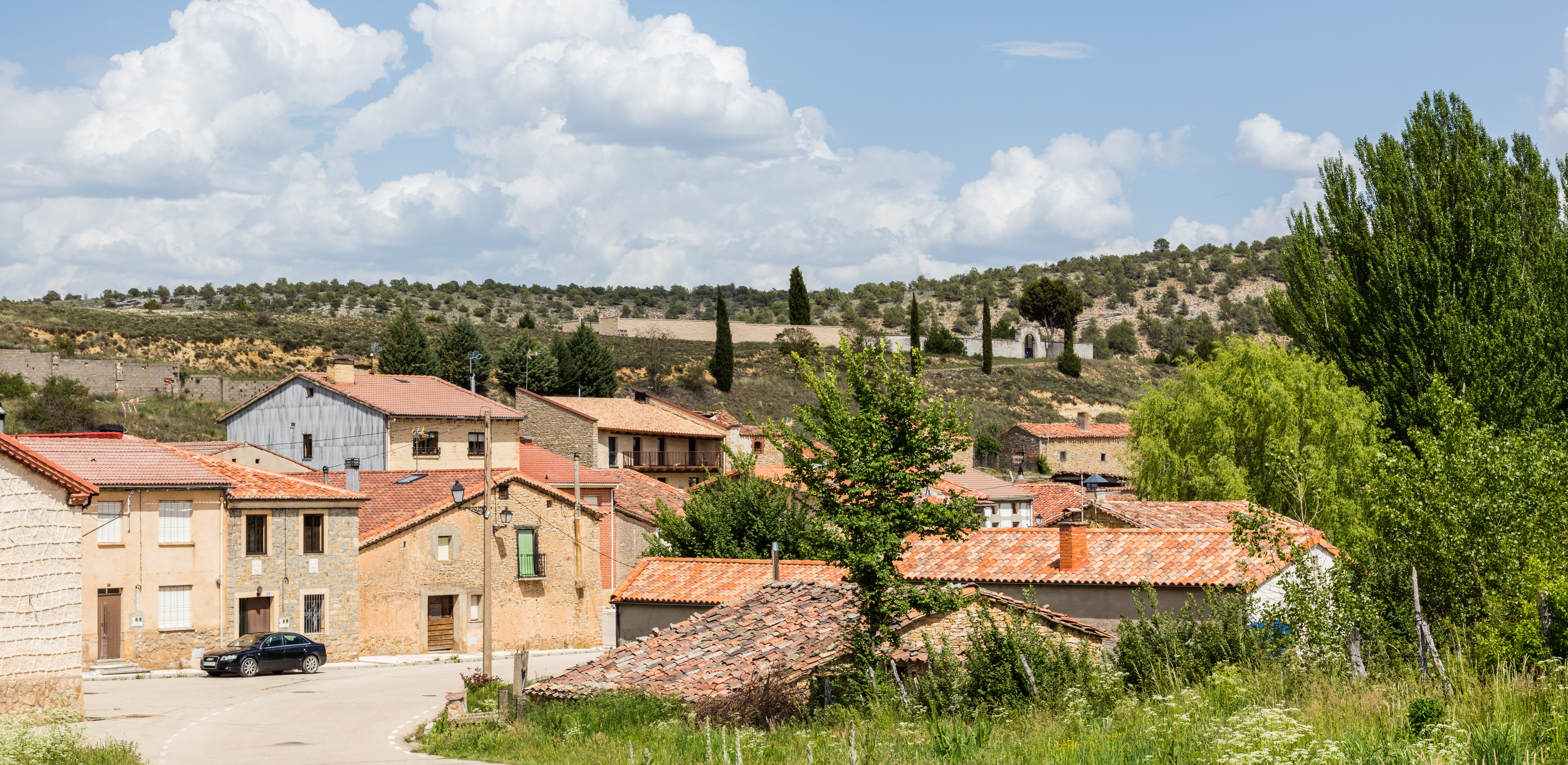
- View of Muriel de la Fuente

- Location in Spain. Muriel de la Fuente (Spain)
- Coordinates: 41°43′27″N 2°51′39″W
- Country: Spain
- Autonomous community: Castile and León
- Province: Soria
- Municipality: Muriel de la Fuente

Area
  - Total: 3 km^{2} (1.2 sq mi)

Population (2025-01-01)
  - Total: 53
  - Density: 18/km^{2} (46/sq mi)
- Time zone: UTC+1 (CET)
  - Summer (DST): UTC+2 (CEST)
- Website: Official website

Muriel de la Fuente is a municipality located in the province of Soria, Castile and León, Spain.

According to the INE national census, the municipality had a population of 91 inhabitants in 2004. By 2018 the population had declined to 60.
