= Torrubia de Soria =

- Municipality
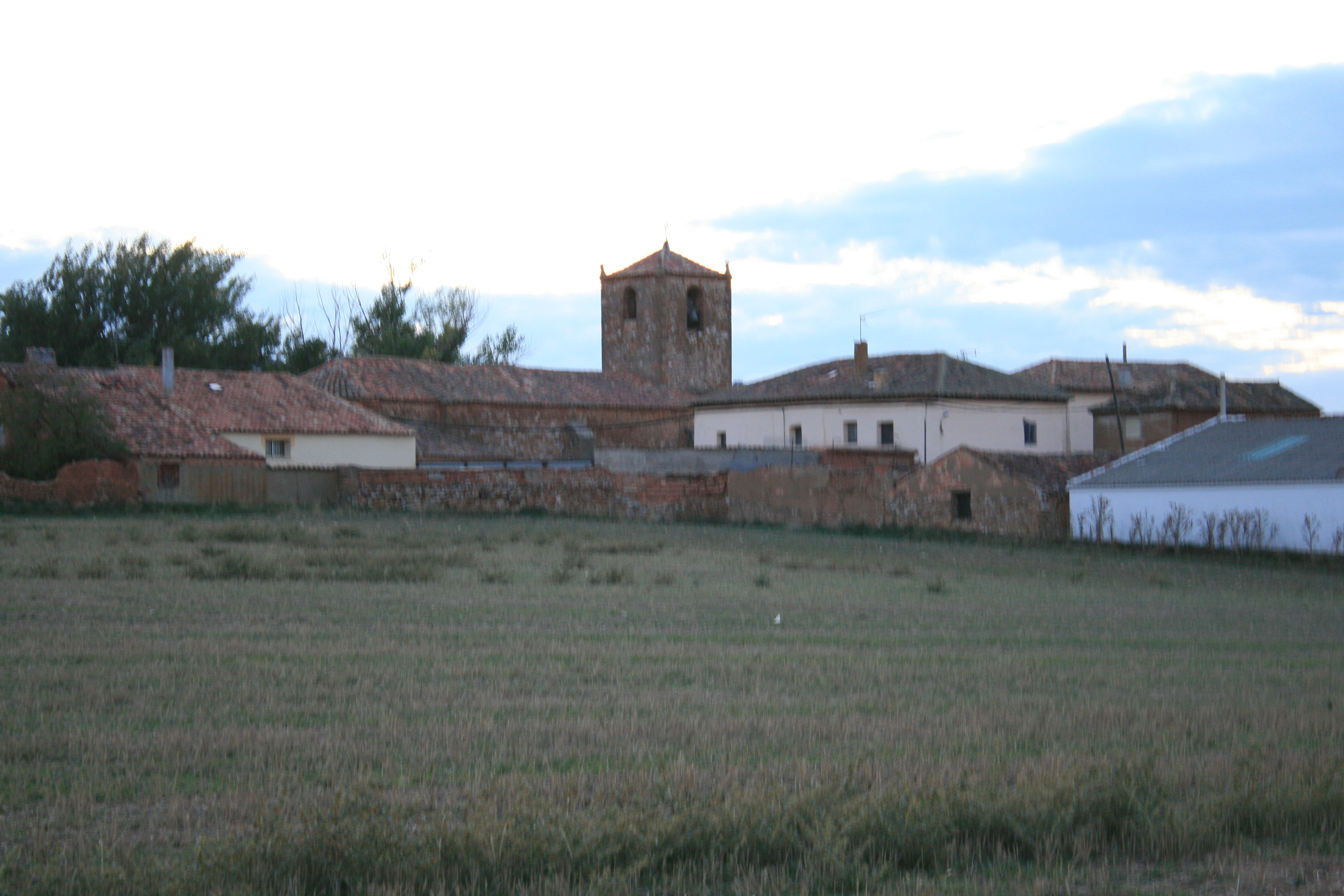

- Location in Spain. Torrubia de Soria (Spain)
- Coordinates: 41°43′01″N 3°03′05″W
- Country: Spain
- Autonomous community: Castile and León
- Province: Soria
- Municipality: Torrubia de Soria

Area
  - Total: 52 km^{2} (20 sq mi)
- Elevation: 1,048 m (3,438 ft)

Population (2025-01-01)
  - Total: 52
  - Density: 1.0/km^{2} (2.6/sq mi)
- Time zone: UTC+1 (CET)
  - Summer (DST): UTC+2 (CEST)
- Website: Official website

Torrubia de Soria is a municipality located in the province of Soria, Castile and León, Spain. According to the 2004 census (INE), the municipality has a population of 81 inhabitants.
