= Valtajeros =

- Municipality
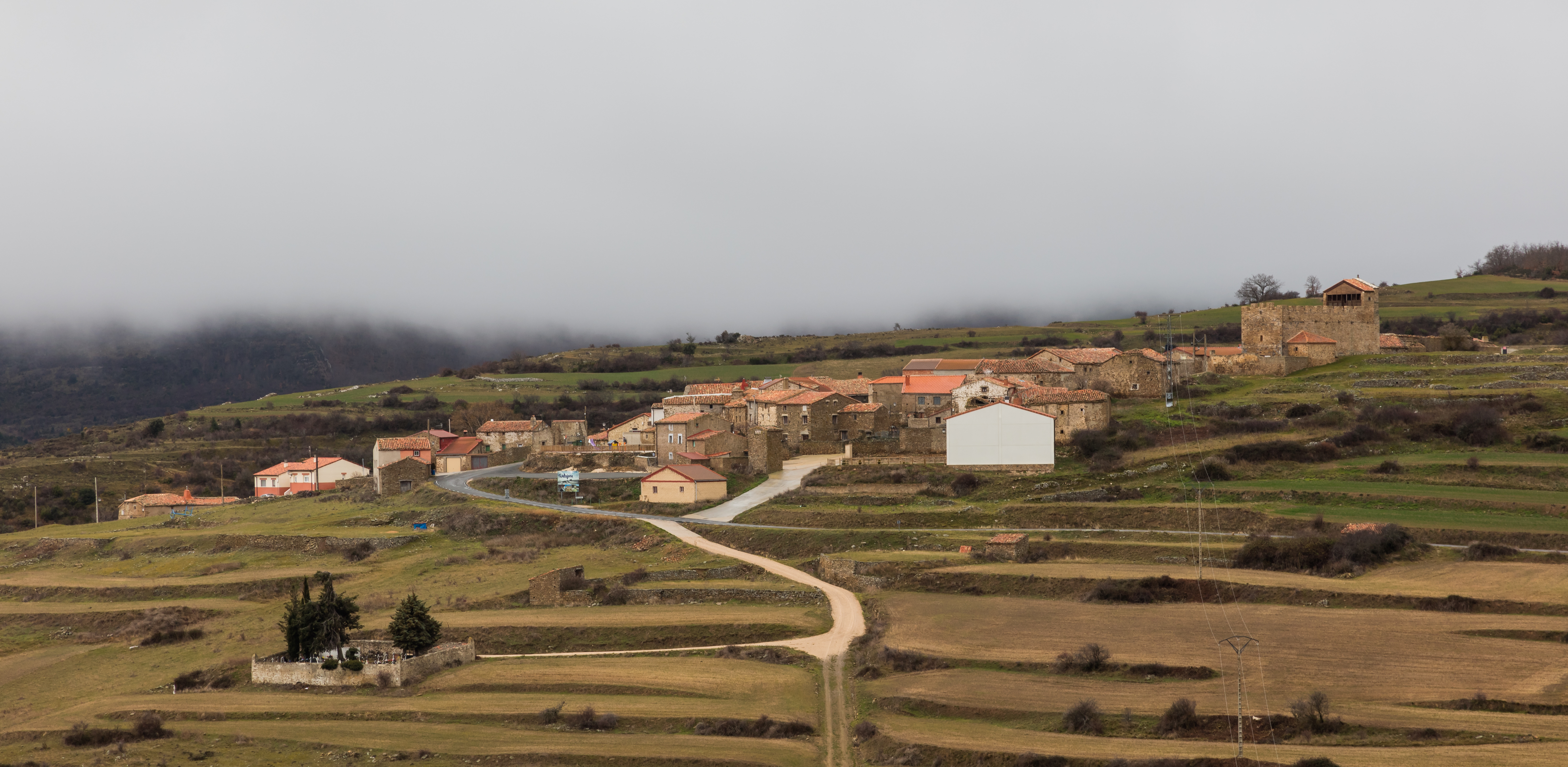
- View of Valtajeros

- Location in Spain. Valtajeros (Spain)
- Coordinates: 41°56′18″N 2°13′21″W
- Country: Spain
- Autonomous community: Castile and León
- Province: Soria
- Municipality: Valtajeros

Area
  - Total: 22.93 km^{2} (8.85 sq mi)
- Elevation: 1,253 m (4,111 ft)

Population (2025-01-01)
  - Total: 16
  - Density: 0.70/km^{2} (1.8/sq mi)
- Time zone: UTC+1 (CET)
  - Summer (DST): UTC+2 (CEST)

Valtajeros is a municipality in the province of Soria in the autonomous community of Castile and León, Spain. It is situated on the Alhama River and has approximately 34 inhabitants. It has an altitude of 1261m.

Valtajeros has a twelfth-century church called Iglesia de Nuestra Señora del Collado (The Church of Our Lady of Collado) situated at the town's highest point.

Local industry includes cereal growing and a cattle ranch. Wildlife in the area includes Wild Boar and Red Deer.
