= Villasayas =

- Municipality
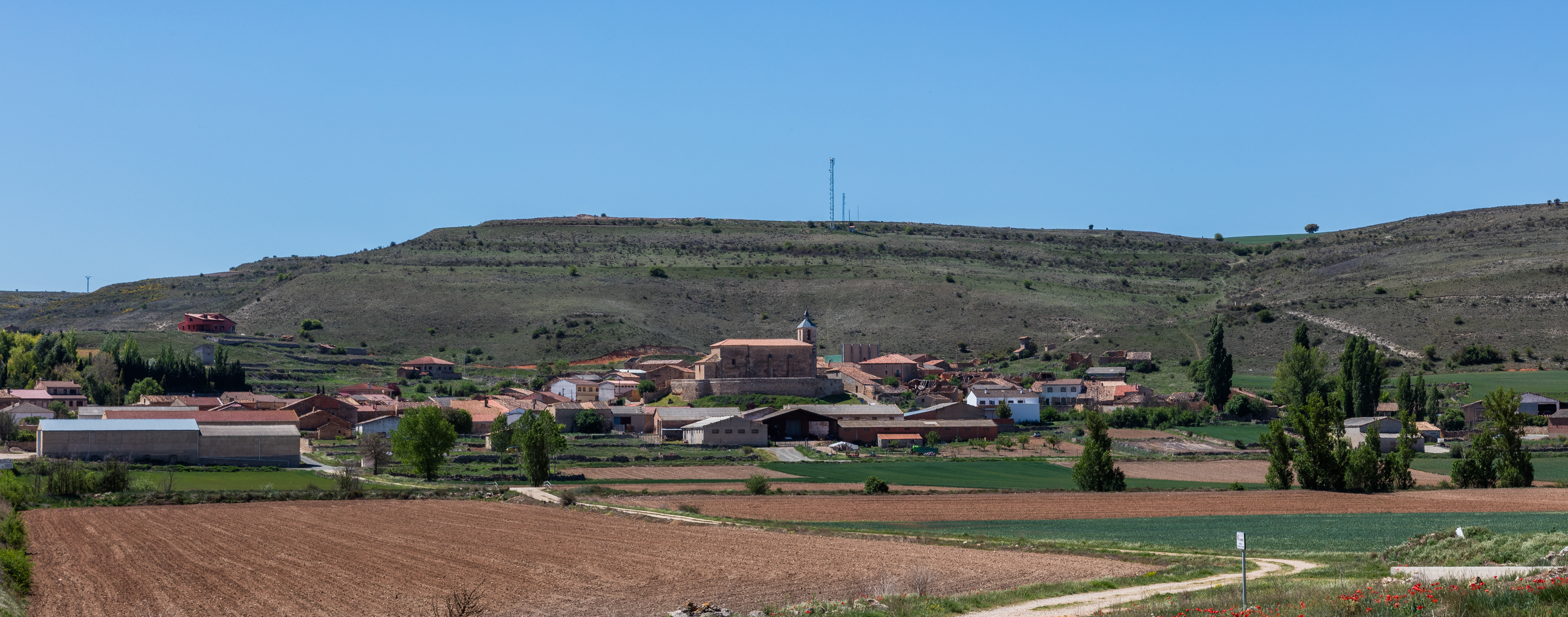

- Location in Spain. Villasayas (Spain)
- Coordinates: 42°21′09″N 2°36′38″W
- Country: Spain
- Autonomous community: Castile and León
- Province: Soria
- Municipality: Villasayas

Area
  - Total: 61.76 km^{2} (23.85 sq mi)

Population (2025-01-01)
  - Total: 59
  - Density: 0.96/km^{2} (2.5/sq mi)
- Time zone: UTC+1 (CET)
  - Summer (DST): UTC+2 (CEST)

Villasayas is a municipality located in the province of Soria, Castile and León, Spain. It had a population of 96 at the 2004 census (INE).
