= Valdenebro =

- Municipality
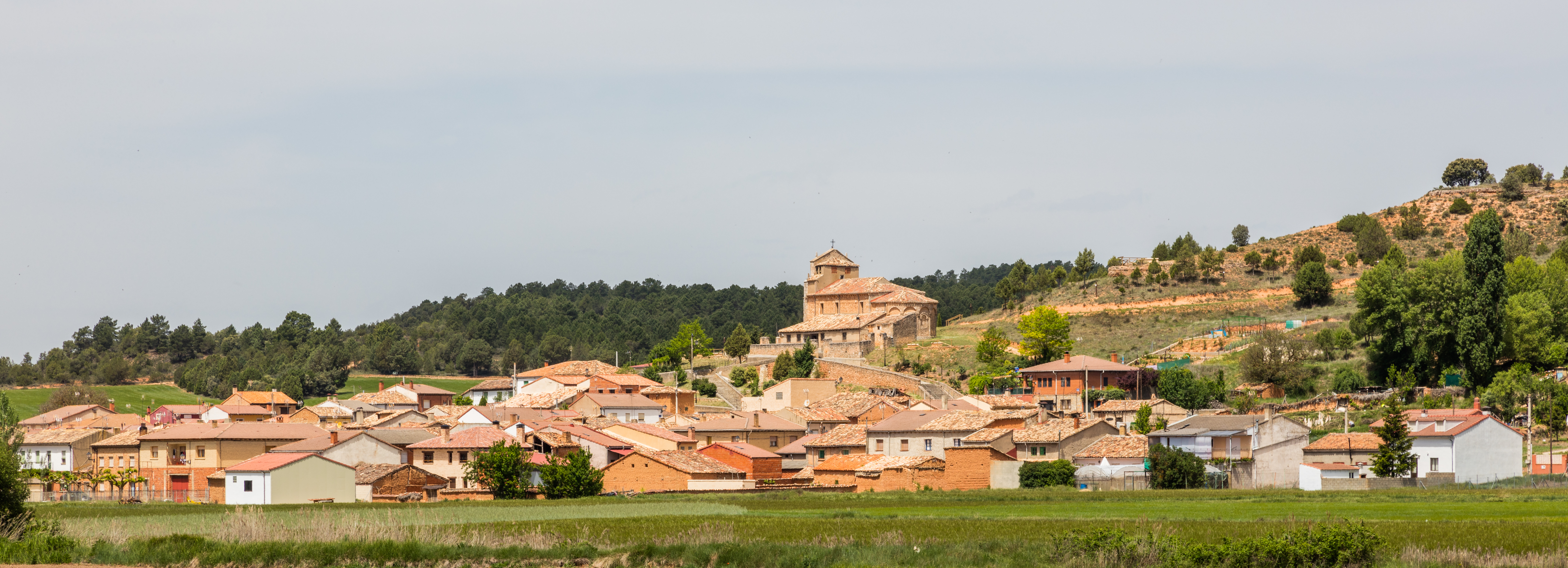

- Flag Coat of arms

- Location in Spain. Valdenebro (Spain)
- Coordinates: 41°34′15″N 2°57′50″W
- Country: Spain
- Autonomous community: Castile and León
- Province: Soria

Government
  - Alcalde (Mayor): Baltasar Lope de la Blanca

Area
  - Total: 51.41 km^{2} (19.85 sq mi)
- Elevation: 935 m (3,068 ft)

Population (2025-01-01)
  - Total: 85
  - Density: 1.7/km^{2} (4.3/sq mi)
- Time zone: UTC+1 (CET)
  - Summer (DST): UTC+2 (CEST)
- Website: http://www.valdenebro.es/

Valdenebro is a municipality located in the province of Soria, in Castile and León, Spain. According to the 2017 census (INE), the municipality has a population of 114 inhabitants.
