= Bayubas de Arriba =

- Municipality
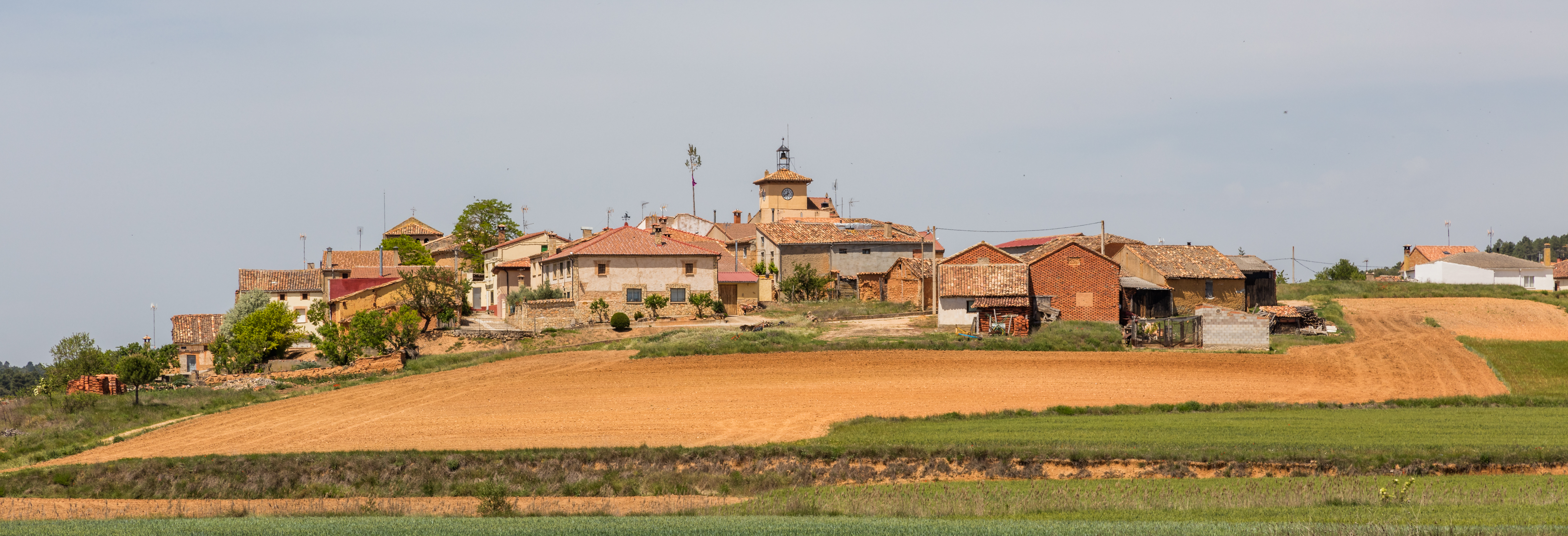
- Bayubas de Arriba

- Flag Coat of arms

- Location in Spain Bayubas de Arriba (Spain)
- Country: Spain
- Autonomous community: Castile and León
- Province: Soria
- Comarca: Comunidad de villa y tierra de Berlanga

Area
  - Total: 20.62 km^{2} (7.96 sq mi)
- Elevation: 958 m (3,143 ft)

Population (2025-01-01)
  - Total: 56
  - Density: 2.7/km^{2} (7.0/sq mi)
- Time zone: UTC+1 (CET)
  - Summer (DST): UTC+2 (CEST)

Bayubas de Arriba is a municipality located in the province of Soria, Castile and León, Spain. According to the 2025 census (INE), the municipality has a population of 56 inhabitants.
