= Bayubas de Abajo =

- Municipality
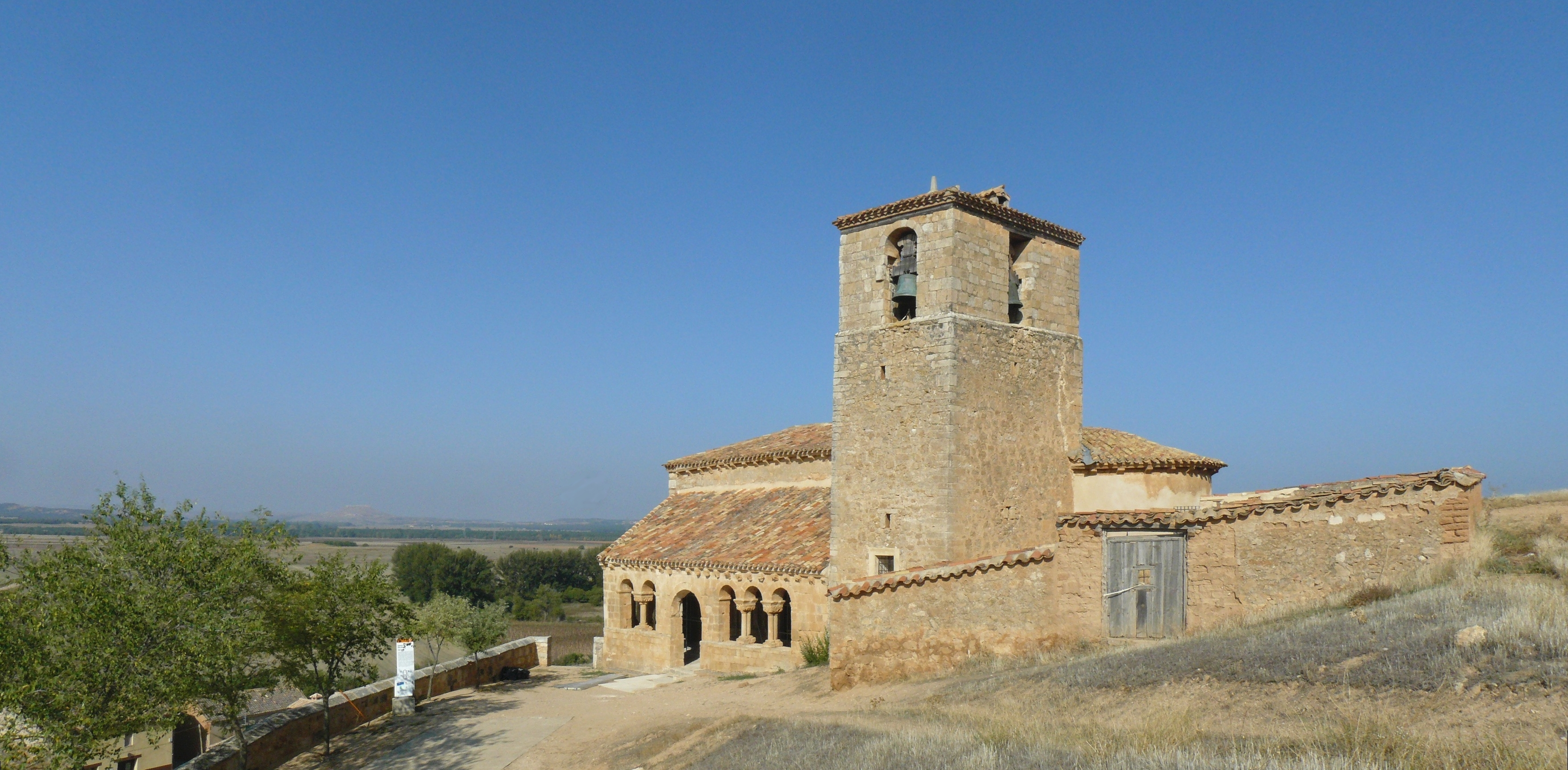
- Romanesque church of San Martín, in the hamlet of Aguilera, Bayubas de Abajo

- Flag Coat of arms

- Location in Spain Bayubas de Abajo (Spain)
- Country: Spain
- Autonomous community: Castile and León
- Province: Soria
- Comarca: Comunidad de villa y tierra de Berlanga

Area
  - Total: 43 km^{2} (17 sq mi)

Population (2025-01-01)
  - Total: 148
  - Density: 3.4/km^{2} (8.9/sq mi)
- Time zone: UTC+1 (CET)
  - Summer (DST): UTC+2 (CEST)

Bayubas de Abajo is a municipality located in the province of Soria, Castile and León, Spain. According to the 2004 census (INE), the municipality has a population of 250 inhabitants.
