= List of Bienes de Interés Cultural in the Province of Soria =

This is a list of Bien de Interés Cultural landmarks in the Province of Soria, Spain.

== List ==
- Arab arch (Ágreda)
- Bridge of Masegoso
- Church of la Virgen del Rivero
- Church of San Juan de Rabanera
- Church of San Nicolás (Soria)
- Church of San Pedro (Caracena)
- Co-Cathedral of San Pedro, Soria
- Hermitage of la Virgen del Val
- Hermitage of Nuestra Señora de Bienvenida (Monteagudo de las Vicarías)
- Hermitage of San Miguel de Gormaz
- Monastery of San Juan de Duero
- Monastery of Santa María de Huerta
- Numantia
- Palace of los Condes de Gómara
- Palace of los Ríos y Salcedo
- Puente de Masegoso
- Roman arch (Medinaceli)
- St Peter's church, Caracena
- Walls and gate of Villa de Monteagudo de las Vicarías
