= Castle of Gormaz =

Historic site in Spain

- Castillo de Gormaz (Spanish)
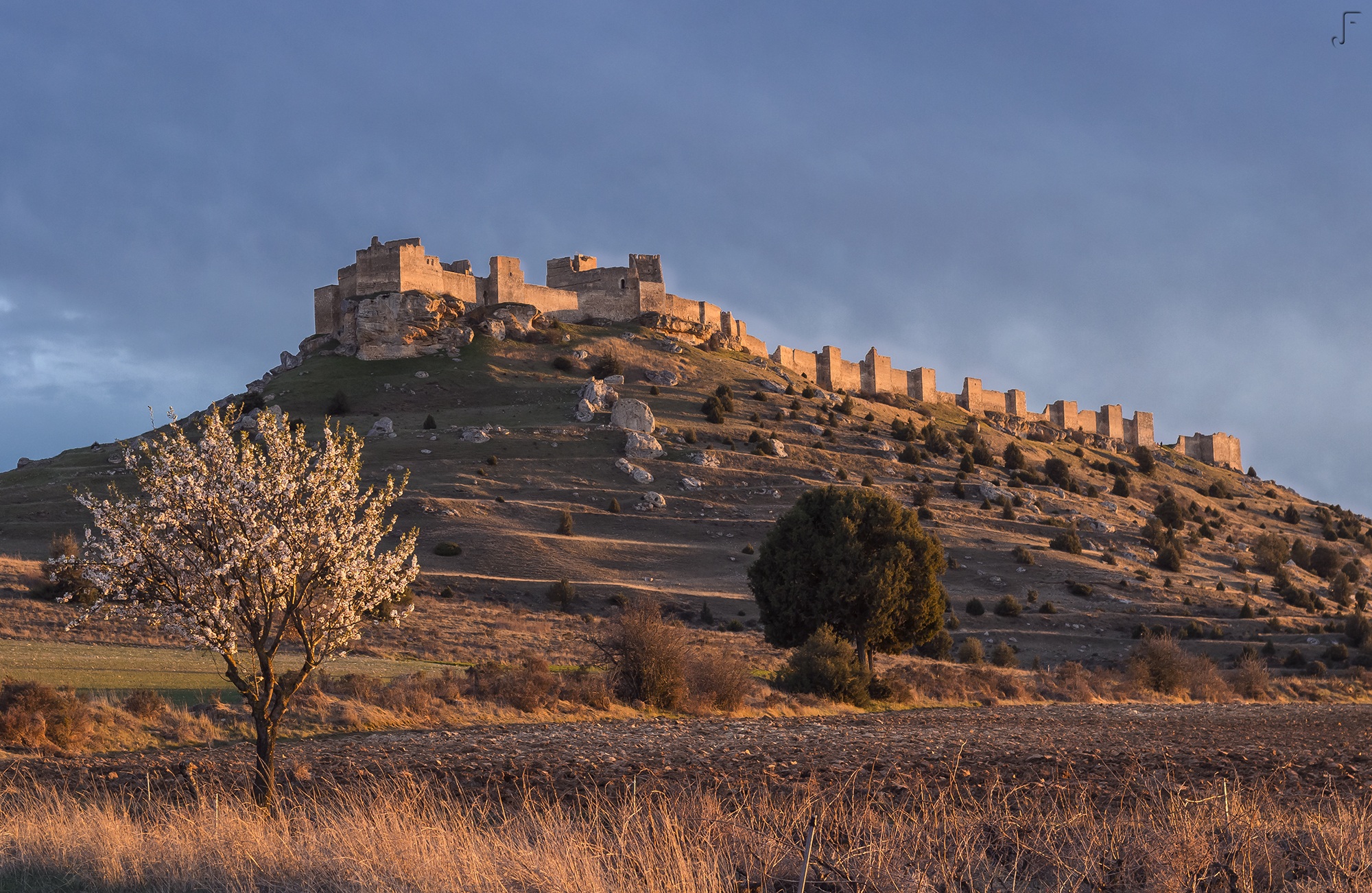
- Interactive map of Castle of Gormaz
- 41.4937°N 3.0080°W
- Type: castle
- Location: Gormaz, Spain

History
- Built: 965 (current form)

Site notes
- Architectural styles: Moorish architecture, Spanish architecture
- Restored: 14th century

The Castle of Gormaz (Spanish: Fortaleza de Gormaz or Castillo de Gormaz) is a large castle located in Gormaz, Spain. Its current structure was built in 965 to defend the borders of the Caliphate of Cordoba. At the time of its construction, it was the largest fortress in Europe.

== Location ==
The castle is located 13 kilometers south-east of El Burgo de Osma, at Gormaz, in the province of Soria, in the autonomous community of Castile-Leon, Spain. It is situated north of the Duero river, placed on a hill that rises 100 m above the river level.

Gormaz not only controls a contemporary bridge on the Duero, but it is in an area rich, in all directions, in watch-towers also of the middle of the 8th century AD and with some land-owners' towers such as the one that now serves as the belfry of the church of Bordecorex.

The area is rich in relics from this period, near to Sepúlveda and Segovia to the West, Ágreda to the East, Berlanga de Duero to the Southeast. This is probably one of the oldest standing ensembles of military architecture in Western Europe.

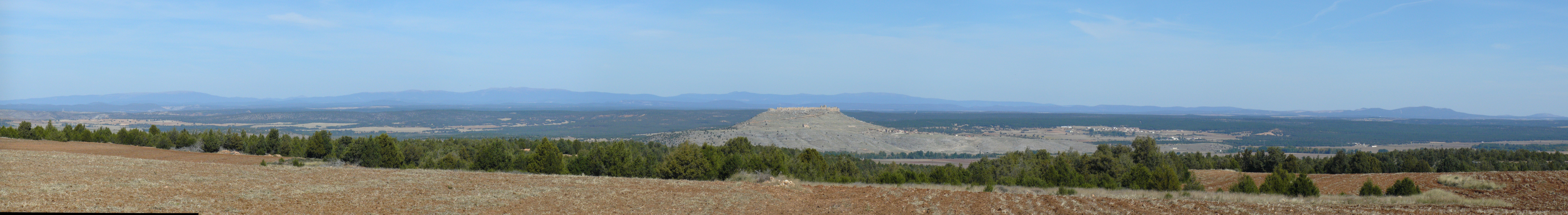
View of the castle from the south

== History ==
The site of the castle, or the surrounding area, was frequently contested between the Muslim-controlled Al-Andalus to the south (ruled by the Umayyad dynasty) and the smaller Christian kingdoms to the north during the 10th century. An existing fortification thus existed here before the current castle. Christian chronicles mention that the site was reconquered by Muslim forces in 925 and 940, indicating that it changed hands multiple times between the forces on either side of the frontier. The current castle was built or rebuilt in 965–66 by Ghalib ibn Abd al-Rahman, a general serving under Caliph al-Hakam II at the time. The earliest mentions of the fortress and this reconstruction in Arabic chronicles were recorded by al-Maqqari. A foundation stone with an inscription mentioning this date and the caliph's name was also found in the nearby Hermitage of San Miguel de Gormaz (and kept today at the Burgo de Osma Cathedral) and is believed to come from the fortress, further supporting this construction date. It probably acted as the key defensive point in what was an extensive network of fortifications that defended this part of the northern border of Al-Andalus. The fortress was the largest fortification built by the Caliphate of Cordoba in this region and was the largest castle in Europe at the time.

In 974–975, the fortress resisted a major siege by the combined forces of Sancho of Navarre, Garcia of Castile, and Ramiro III of Leon (under the regency of his aunt Elvira Ramírez). The castle was relieved by a force led by general Ghalib in the summer of 975, which then pursued Garcia's retreating forces into Castile. The fortress may have nonetheless been captured by a Christian force sometime between 975 and 983, as Christian chronicles report that the Muslims recaptured it in 983. There is textual evidence that the caliphs of Cordoba promised to hand over the fortress to Sancho III in 1009 or in 1011 during the political upheaval of the Fitna (civil war) of Al-Andalus, but it is unclear whether this surrender of the fortress actually took place. Likewise, historical sources report that Fernando I captured the fortress in 1059, perhaps permanently, but the same sources also imply that this occupation was brief. Some archeological evidence suggests that Muslims were still maintaining and repairing the castle in the 1060s. By the end of the century, however, the Duero region, along with the major city of Toledo to the south, had come under the definitive control of Castile.

After its definitive Christian conquest, the castle was occupied by a variety of lords. Alfonso VI gave the castle to El Cid in 1087. In the 14th century the castle was strategically important in the conflict between Pedro I of Castile and Pedro IV of Aragon, during which period it changed hands multiple times and underwent important restoration and repair work. Archeological evidence shows that the main part of the castle was occupied by a small urban settlement during this period. Sometime after the 14th-century conflicts, however, it was abandoned and fell into ruins. Modern excavations of the site began in 1922 and have continued since, with major investigations in the late 20th century led by Juan Zozaya.

== Design ==
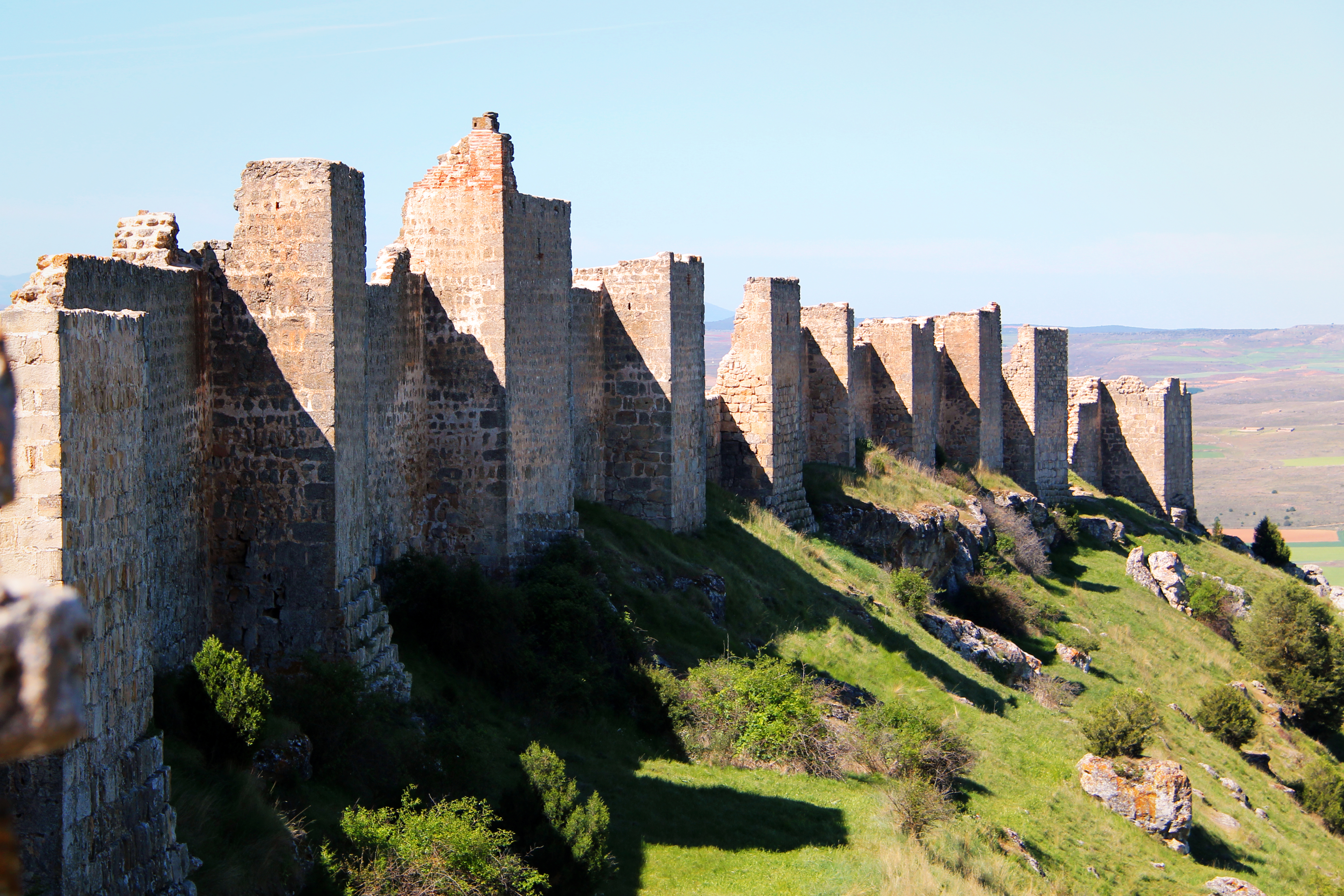
The northern wall

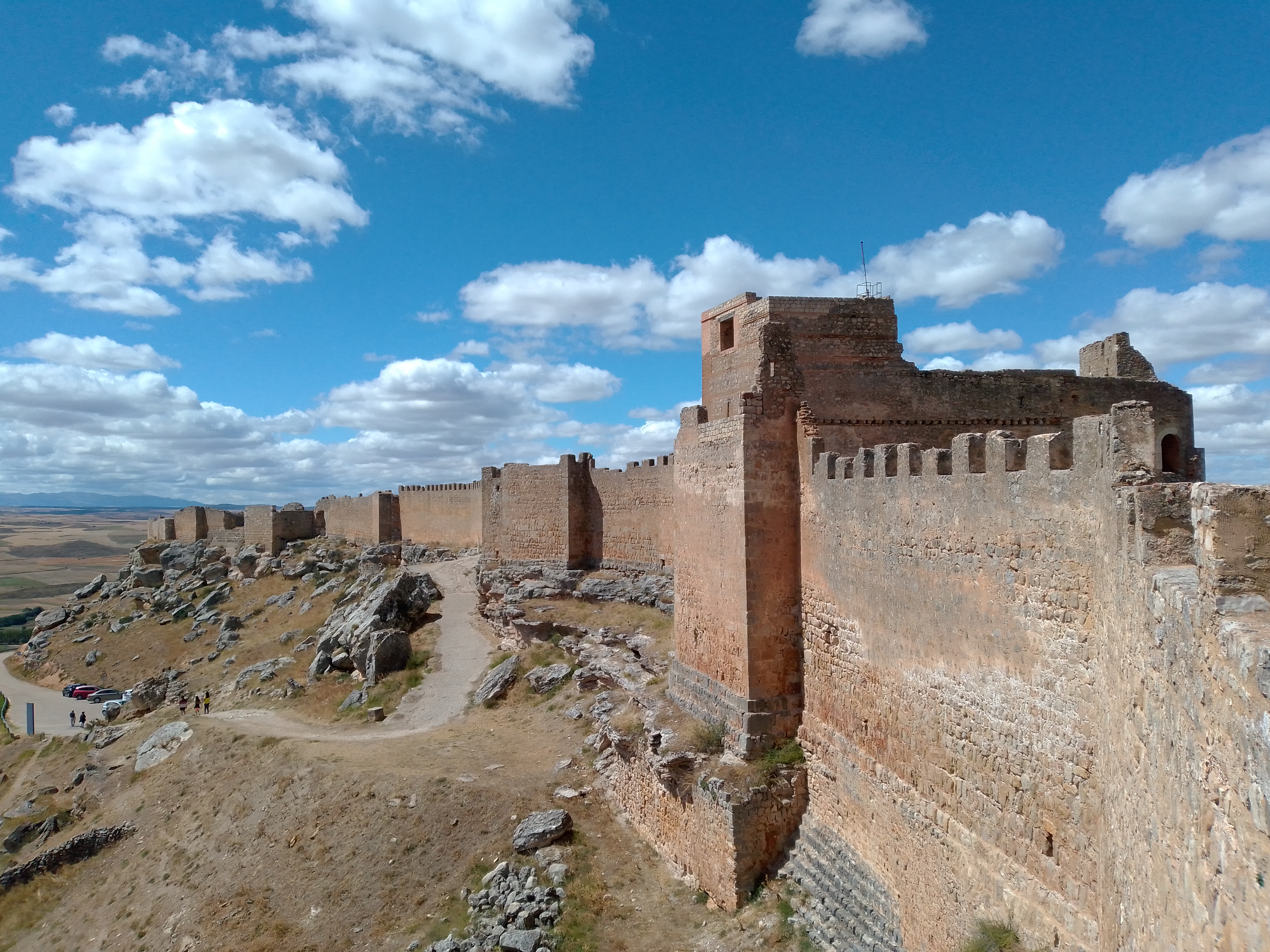
The southern walls

The castle is built in masonry stone. Its construction probably re-used available masonry from previous structures built on the site. Its total perimeter is about one kilometer long and has an irregular shape adapted to the topology of the ridge it stands on. The area occupied by the castle is roughly 380 meters long and varies in width between 17 and 63 meters. The walls are about 10 meters high. They are reinforced by 27 towers (or 24) which project outward slightly from the rest of the wall. The northern wall is built in large rough stone and has a more regular layout, running in a nearly straight line with 15 towers spaced at regular intervals. The southern wall has a more irregular and curved outline but was built with a more sophisticated masonry technique of carved stone that enhanced its defensive structure. Erosion and landslides over the centuries, however, have damaged the southern wall more severely than the northern walls of the castle. These eroding landslides occurred even in medieval times, as evidenced by the multiple repairs and reconstructions carried out on damaged parts of the wall.

The castle had at least two entrances which have been preserved today, although some scholars have argued that there were other gates as well. The main entrance is to the southwest overlooking a rocky outcrop of the hill, facing the river and the former Muslim side of the frontier. A second gate, a smaller postern gate, is located in the northern wall and was accessed through a vaulted corridor.

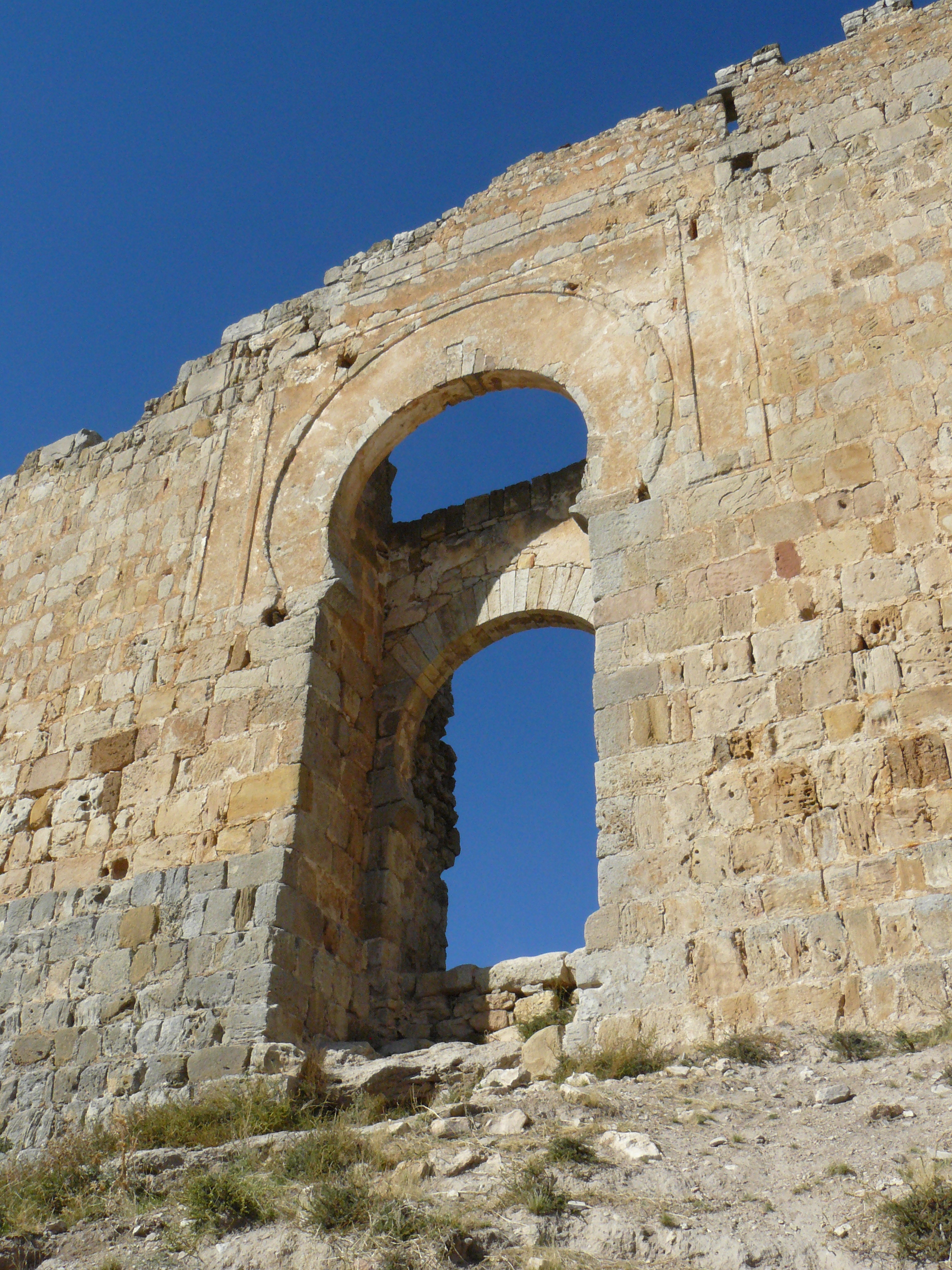
The main gate

The main gate consists of two monumental horseshoe archways, located one behind the other at a distance of 1.26 meters. The gate superficially appears as if it is set within one continuous wall but Antonio Almagro has noted that it actually occupies the space between two towers. The short space between the two archways could be used by defenders to throw projectiles from above onto any attackers while still being sheltered from harassment by other attackers located outside the gate. The outer archway has span of 2.76 meters and is 7 meters tall from the ground to its keystone (although Almagro notes that the ground has receded due to erosion). The surface of the outer wall around the arch was once covered in plaster or stucco decoration set inside an alfiz (a decorative rectangular frame carved around the arch). Only fragments of the original decoration have been preserved. The area immediately around the arch was likely painted with "false" voussoirs as part of this decoration, while the rectangular band of the alfiz may have been decorated with an Arabic inscription or with geometric motifs. This overall decorative layout was typical of the caliphal period of Cordoba and is seen also in other monuments of the time like the Great Mosque of Cordoba and Madinat al-Zahra.

The eastern end of the castle was occupied by a citadel with its own walls which are higher and more heavily fortified than the rest of the castle. This citadel may date from the 965 construction or it may date from modifications in later centuries, most likely during the 14th century. It was accessed from the western part of the castle through a bent-entrance gate inside a tower. The eastern citadel probably served as a keep and a last line of defense while the larger western section served as a residential area, which was large enough to house an army. Both the eastern citadel and the main western part of the castle contained a cistern that provided water. Archeological investigations have revealed one location inside the castle which was covered with white mortar, which some archeologists have interpreted as the remains of a musalla or open-air collective oratory.
