= Taracena (surname) =

Taracena is a Spanish surname. Notable people with the surname include:

- Berta Taracena (1925–2021), Mexican historian, cultural researcher and art critic
- Blas Taracena Aguirre (1895–1951), Spanish archaeologist
- Gerardo Taracena (1970–2026), Mexican actor and dancer
- Mario Taracena (born 1957), Guatemalan politician

== See also ==
- Carlos Santiago Motta Taracena (born 1956), Guatemalan boxer
- Julio Montes Taracena (1915–1997), Guatemalan farmer and scouting leader
- Rodolfo Rincón Taracena (1957–2007), Mexican journalist and crime reporter
