= Puente de Masegoso =

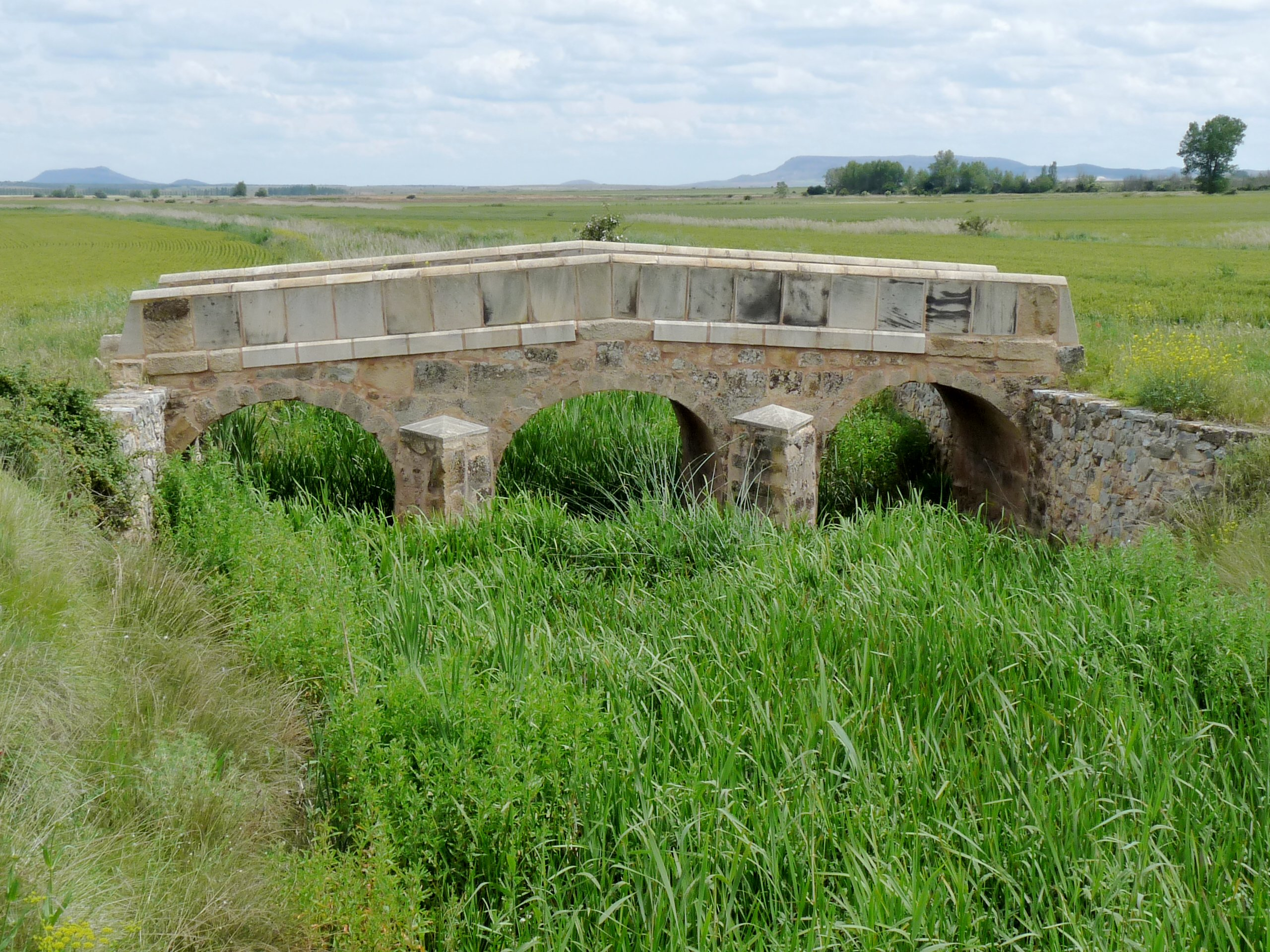

- Location within Spain
- 41.76389°N 2.147222°W
- Location: Pozalmuro, Spain

Spanish Cultural Heritage
- Official name: Puente de Masegoso
- Type: Non-movable
- Criteria: Monument
- Designated: 2001
- Reference no.: RI-51-0010427

The Bridge of Masegoso (Spanish: Puente de Masegoso) is a Roman bridge located in Pozalmuro, Spain. It was declared Bien de Interés Cultural in 2001.
