= Caracena =

Cueva de Ágreda
- Municipality
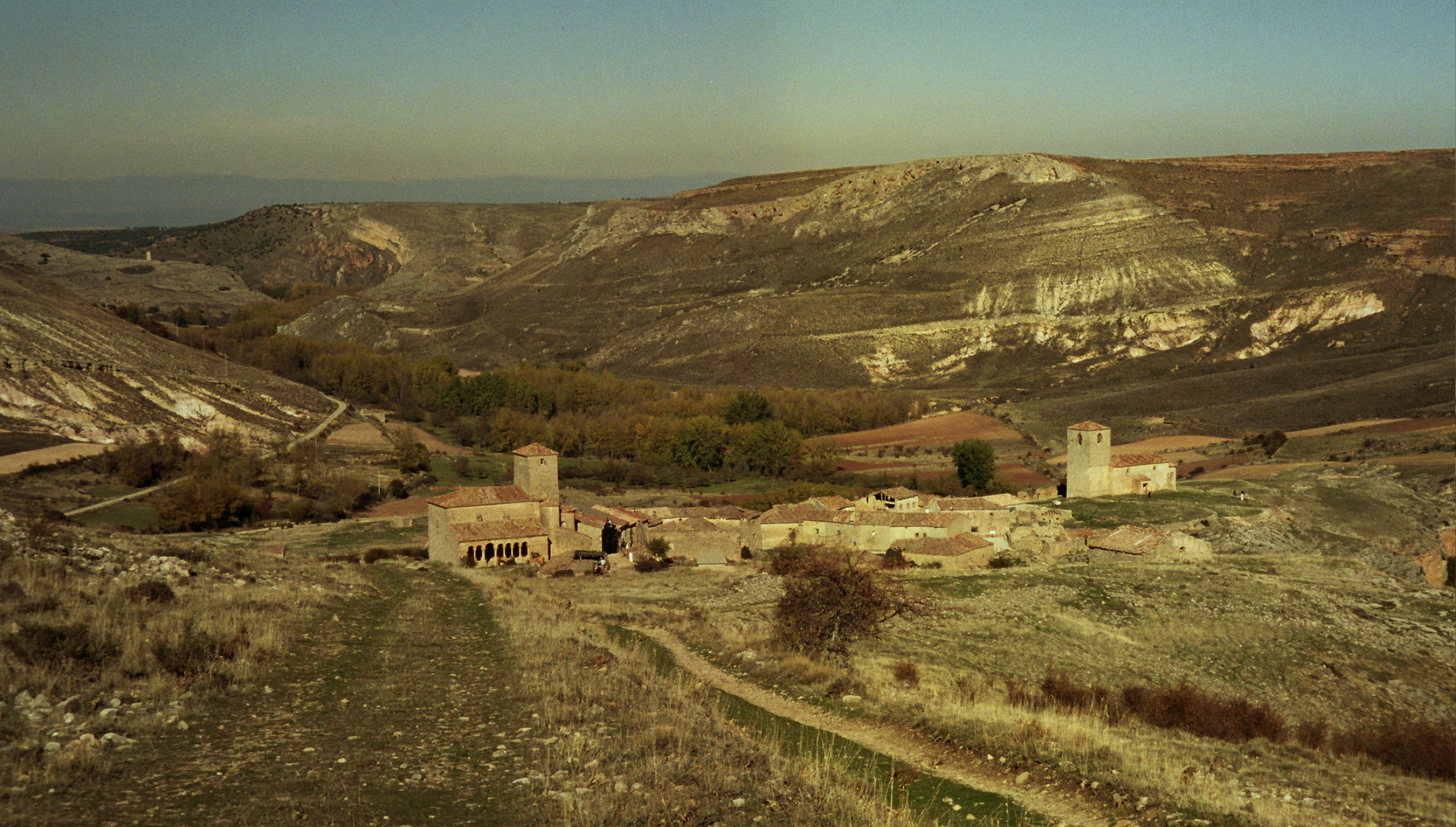
- Panoramic view of Caracena

- Location of Caracena in Soria Province

- Location in Spain. Cueva de Ágreda (Spain)
- Country: Spain
- Autonomous community: Castile and León
- Province: Soria

Area
  - Total: 18.15 km^{2} (7.01 sq mi)
- Elevation: 1,080 m (3,540 ft)

Population (2025-01-01)
  - Total: 13
  - Density: 0.72/km^{2} (1.9/sq mi)
- Time zone: UTC+1 (CET)
  - Summer (DST): UTC+2 (CEST)
- Website: Official website

Caracena is a municipality located in the province of Soria, in the autonomous community of Castile and León, Spain.

It is the site of St Peter's church, Caracena.
