= Martín Almagro Basch =

Spanish archaeologist and writer

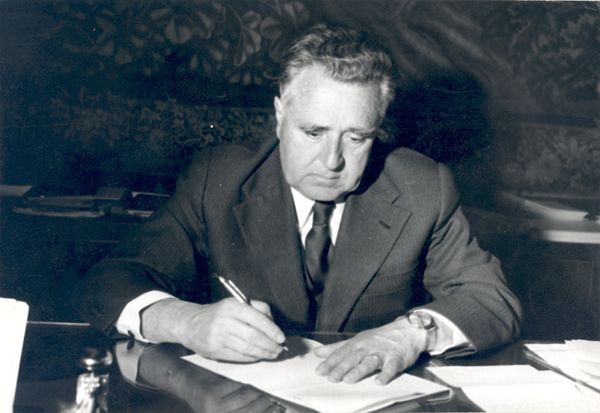
- Born: Martín Almagro Basch; 11 April 1911; Tramacastilla, Spain
- Died: 24 August 1984 (aged 73); Madrid, Spain
- Occupations: archaeologist, historian, writer
- Employer: Museo Arqueológico Nacional de España

Martín Almagro Basch (11 April 1911 – 24 August 1984) was a Spanish archaeologist, historian, and writer. He fought in the Spanish Civil War. He was an archaeology specialist, ranging from rock art to classic archaeology. He was a professor of early human history at the University of Madrid and Barcelona, and was Director of the Museo Arqueológico Nacional "MAN" de Madrid between 1968-1981. He directed the first Spanish archeological expedition in Egypt. His contribution in the transfer and rescue of several Egyptians temples was grateful by the Arab Republic with the concession of the Debod temple, actually in Madrid.

== Biography ==
Martín Almagro Basch was born in Tramacastilla. In childhood, he studied in the school of the Escolapios of Albarracín (Teruel), in 1928-1930 - in the University of Valencia and finally in the Central University of Madrid where he received his doctors degree and studied under Hugo Obermaier. He travelled to Germany where in 1930 he completed his studies.

In 1936, Martín Almagro Basch participated in Spanish Civil War and was listed as soldier in Falange Española de las JONS.

Protected by the Minister of Culture, Manuel Ibáñez Martín, and totally sympathetic to the fascist regime, he obtained a position as a professor of history at the University of Barcelona (1940) converted into a chair (1943). In this post-war period he was director of the Archaeological Museum of Barcelona (the Museum of Archaeology of Catalonia during the Republican period). From this privileged position he controlled, centralized and directed the archaeology developed in Catalonia, with the repression of any local or Catalanist element. At the Empúries site, excavations continued after the death of Emili Gandia, the previous director, using slave labor, as between 1940 and 1943 the "Figueras 71" Disciplinary Battalion, formed by Republican soldiers, was used[1].

In 1940, he was the chairman of the Ancient History of Spain in the University of Santiago, and in 1943, professor of Prehistory of the University of Barcelona.

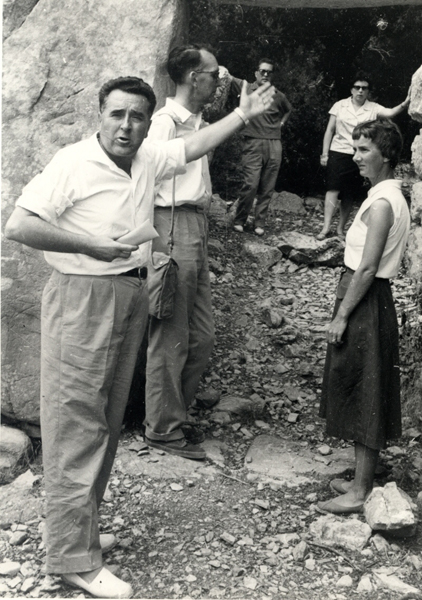
Martín Almagro Basch, 1950-1960

== Works ==
- Introduction to Archaeology (1941)
- Ampurias: History of the City and excavation guide (1951)
- The necropolis of Ampurias (1955)
- The Sovereign Lordship under Azagra Albarracin (1959)
- Introduction to the study of prehistory and the field of archeology(1960)
- Manual of Universal History. Prehistory (1960)
- History of Albarracin and sierra (1959-1964)
- The peninsular Southeast decorated trail (1966)
- Prehistoric art in Spanish Sahara (1968)

== Awards ==
- Medal of Gold to the Merit in the Fine arts
- Civil Order of Alfonso X, the Wise
- Order of Civil Merit
- Cultural gold medal of the Republic of Italy
- Palm of the Académie française
