= Ermita de la Virgen del Val =

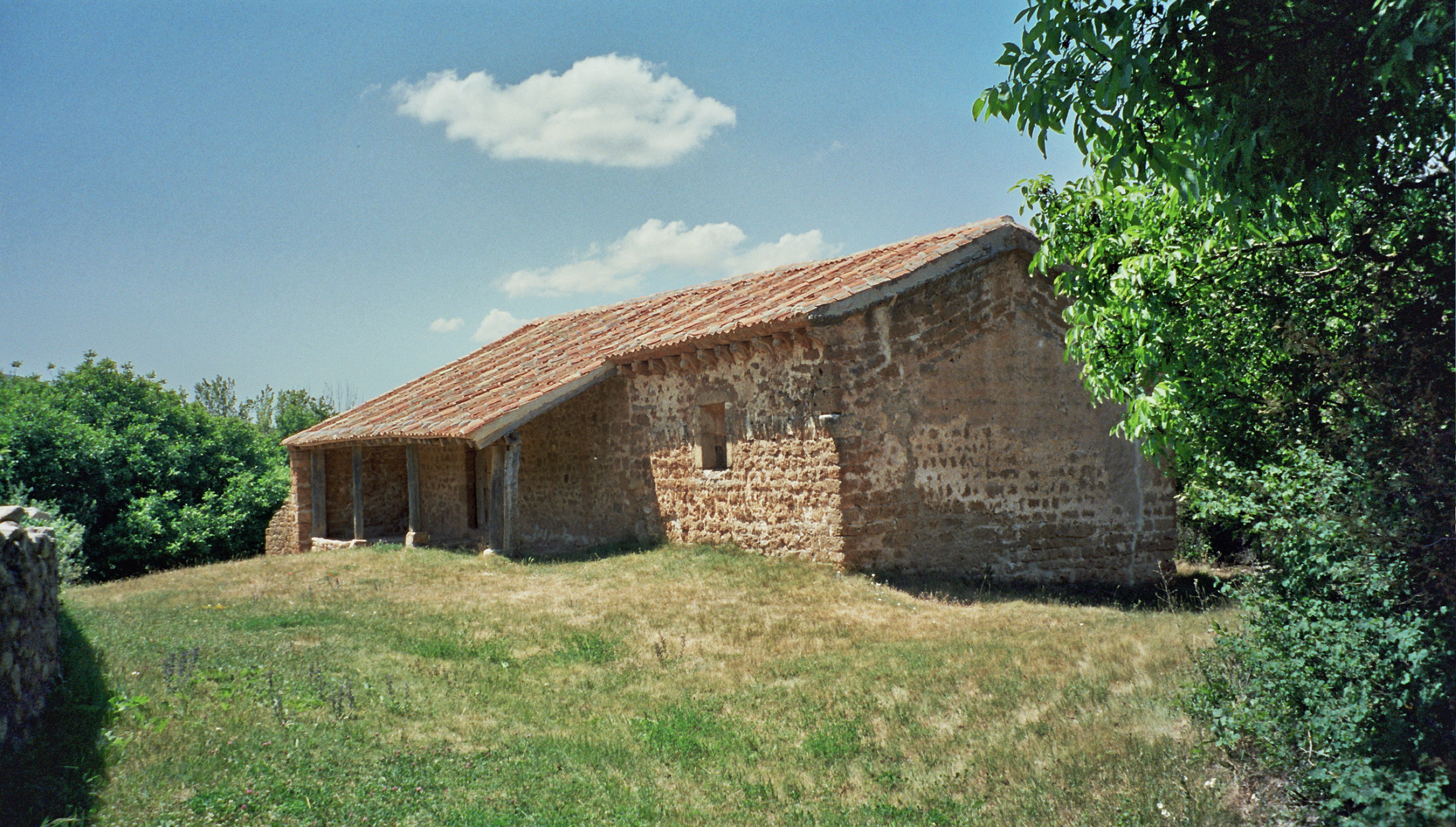

- Location within Spain
- 41.31778°N 3.19417°W
- Location: Montejo de Tiermes, Spain

Spanish Cultural Heritage
- Official name: Ermita de la Virgen del Val
- Type: Non-movable
- Criteria: Monument
- Designated: 2000
- Reference no.: RI-51-0010231

The Ermita de la Virgen del Val is a hermitage located in Montejo de Tiermes, Spain south of the province of Soria. It was declared Bien de Interés Cultural in 2000.

== Architecture ==
The chapel consists of a nave with a rectangular apse and south portico, formed by four wooden pillars resting on rough stone bases.
