= Ermita de Nuestra Señora de Bienvenida =

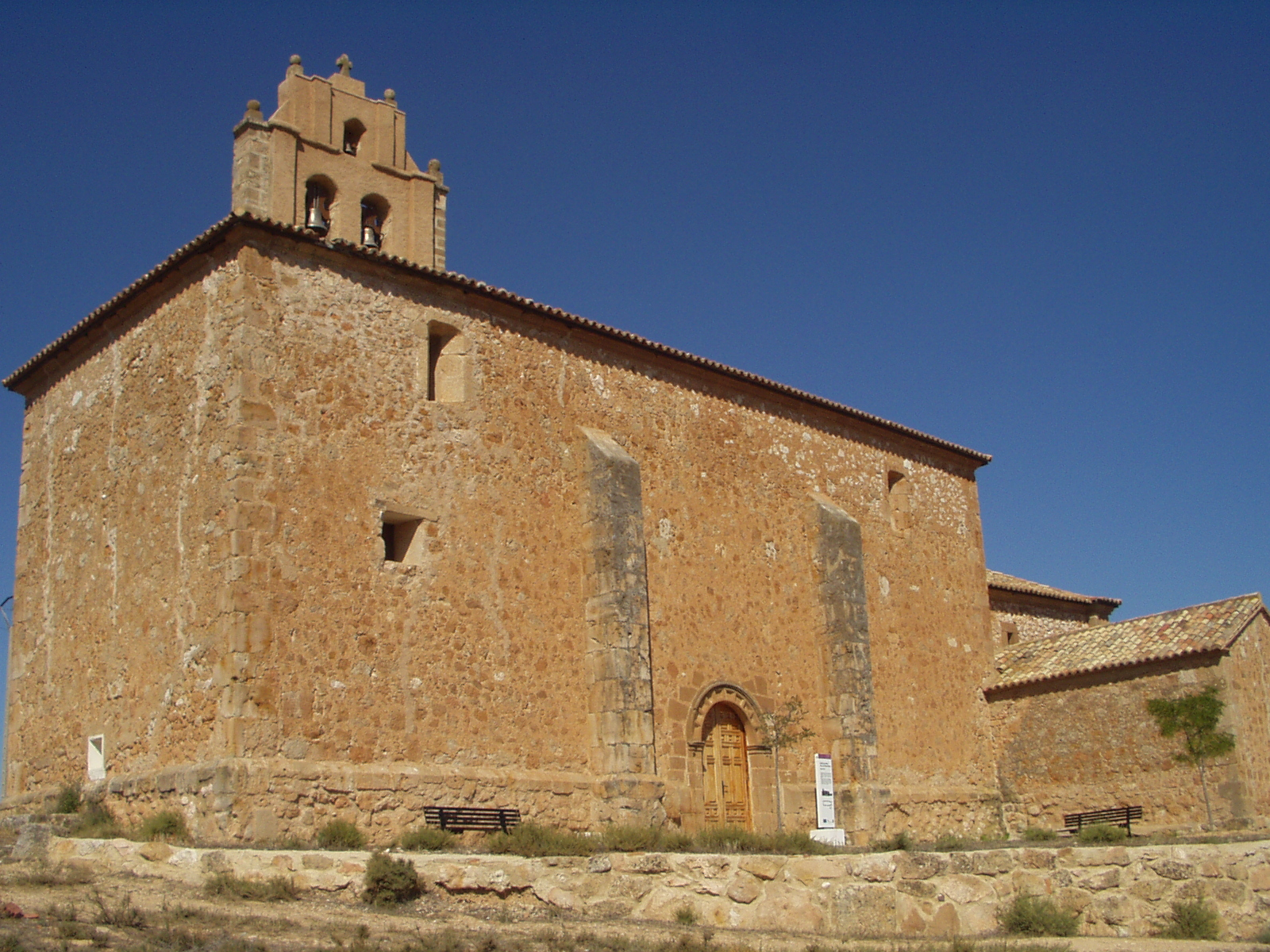

- Location within Spain
- 41.37063°N 2.169941°W
- Location: Monteagudo de las Vicarías, Spain

Spanish Cultural Heritage
- Official name: Ermita de Nuestra Señora de Bienvenida
- Type: Non-movable
- Criteria: Monument
- Designated: 1983
- Reference no.: RI-51-0004951

The Ermita de Nuestra Señora de Bienvenida is a hermitage located in Monteagudo de las Vicarías, Spain. It was declared Bien de Interés Cultural in 1983.
