= Walls and gate of Villa de Monteagudo de las Vicarías =

Historic site in Castile and León, Spain

- Muralla y Puerta de la Villa de Monteagudo de las Vicarías (Spanish)
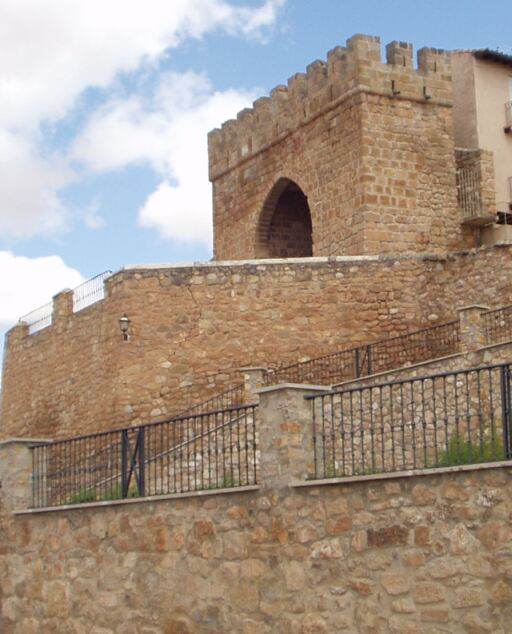

- Location within Spain
- 41.364845°N 2.167932°W
- Location: Monteagudo de las Vicarías, Spain

Spanish Cultural Heritage
- Official name: Muralla y Puerta de la Villa de Monteagudo de las Vicarías
- Type: Non-movable
- Criteria: Monument
- Designated: 1931
- Reference no.: RI-51-0000922

The Walls and gate of Villa de Monteagudo de las Vicarías (Spanish: Muralla y Puerta de la Villa de Monteagudo de las Vicarías) is a gate located in Monteagudo de las Vicarías, Spain. It was declared Bien de Interés Cultural in 1931.
