= Montejo de Tiermes =

- Municipality
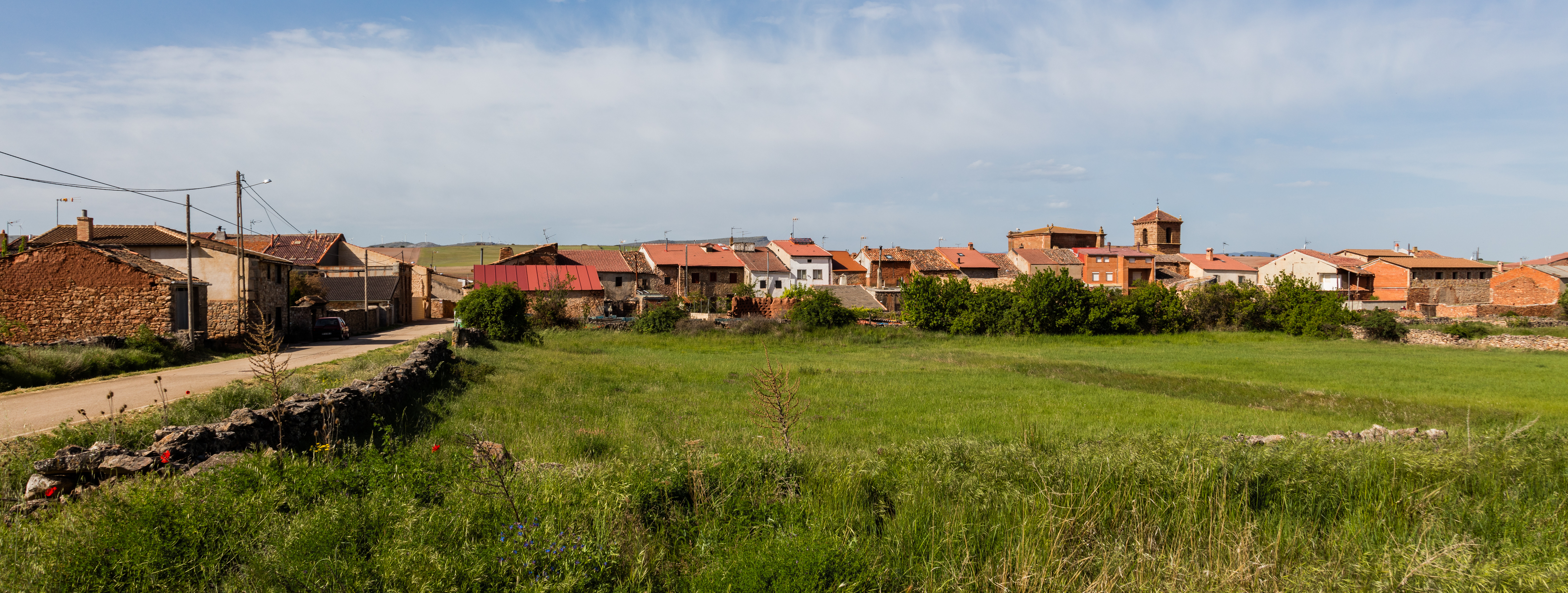
- View of Montejo de Tiermes

- Flag Coat of arms

- Location in Spain. Montejo de Tiermes (Spain)
- Coordinates: 41°22′06″N 3°11′55″W
- Country: Spain
- Autonomous community: Castile and León
- Province: Soria
- Legal district: Partido judicial de El Burgo de Osma

Area
  - Total: 167 km^{2} (64 sq mi)
- Elevation: 1,157 m (3,796 ft)

Population (2025-01-01)
  - Total: 134
  - Density: 0.802/km^{2} (2.08/sq mi)
- Time zone: UTC+1 (CET)
  - Summer (DST): UTC+2 (CEST)
- Website: Official website

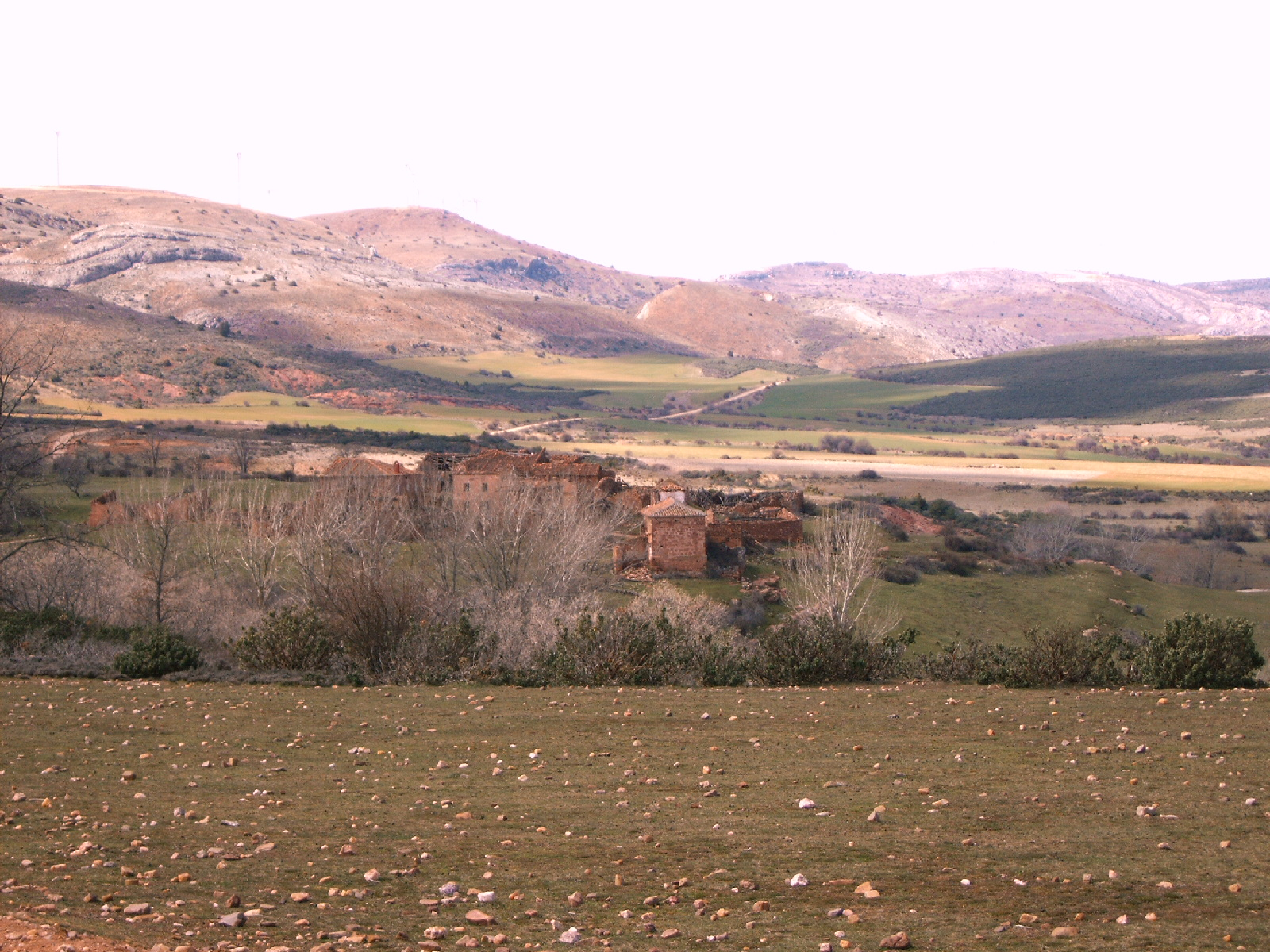
Sotillos de Caracena, uninhabited village located within the boundaries of Montejo de Tiermes

Montejo de Tiermes is a municipality located in the province of Soria, Castile and León, Spain. In 2010 the population of Montejo de Tiermes (municipality) was 198 inhabitants, 126 men and 72 women. Montejo de Tiermes (locality) had a population of 58 inhabitants on 1 January 2010, 41 men and 17 women.

== Tiermes archaeological site ==
In the mid 1930s the Spanish archaeologist Blas Taracena organised digs at the archaeological site at Montejo de Tiermes and called it "the Spanish Pompeii".
