= Caltojar =

- Municipality
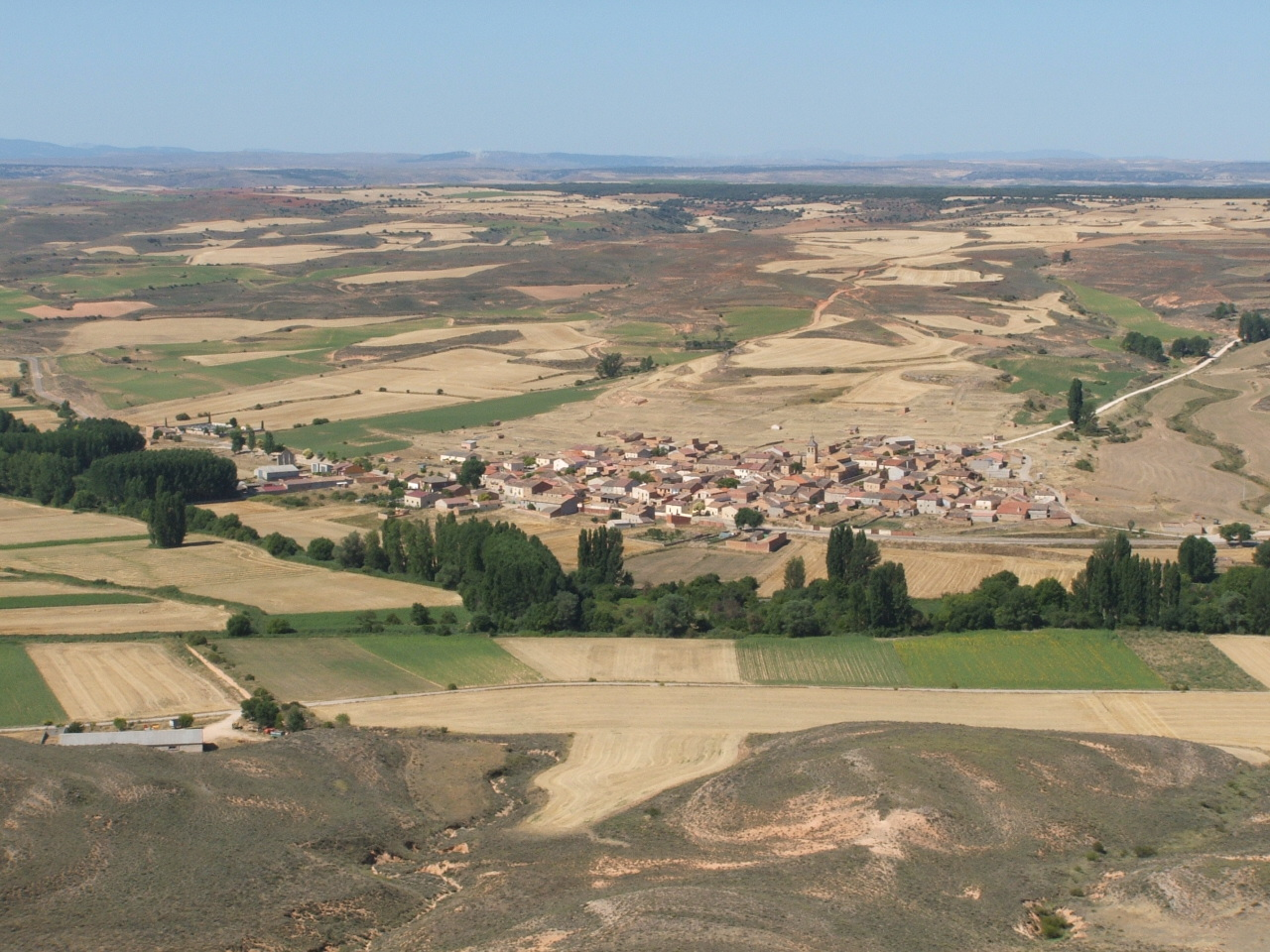
- Aerial view of Caltojar

- Location in Spain. Caltojar (Spain)
- Country: Spain
- Autonomous community: Castile and León
- Province: Soria
- Municipality: Caltojar

Area
  - Total: 84.36 km^{2} (32.57 sq mi)
- Elevation: 961 m (3,153 ft)

Population (2025-01-01)
  - Total: 53
  - Density: 0.63/km^{2} (1.6/sq mi)
- Time zone: UTC+1 (CET)
  - Summer (DST): UTC+2 (CEST)

Caltojar is a municipality located in the province of Soria, Castile and León, Spain. According to the 2004 census (INE), the municipality had a population of 111 inhabitants. The municipality includes the villages of Bordecorex and Casillas de Berlanga.

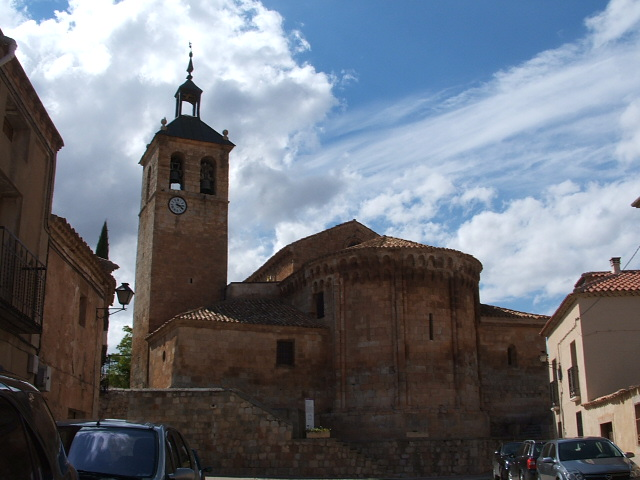
Saint Michael's church, built in the 12th century.

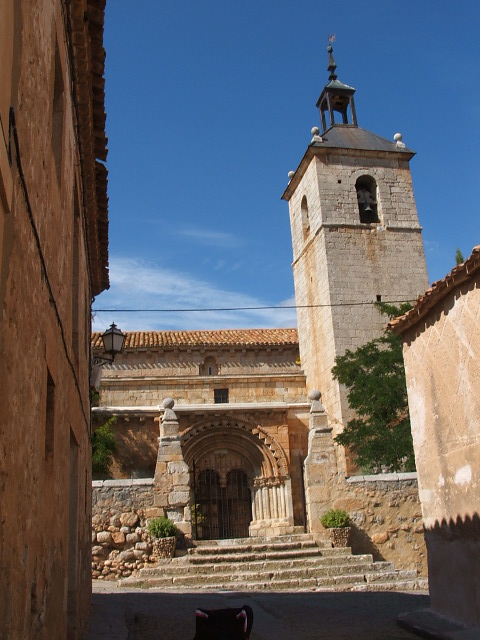
Facade of Saint Michael's church.

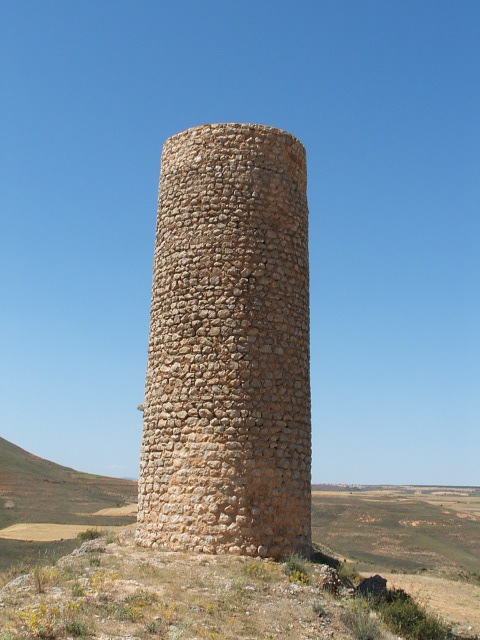
La Veruela Atalaya.

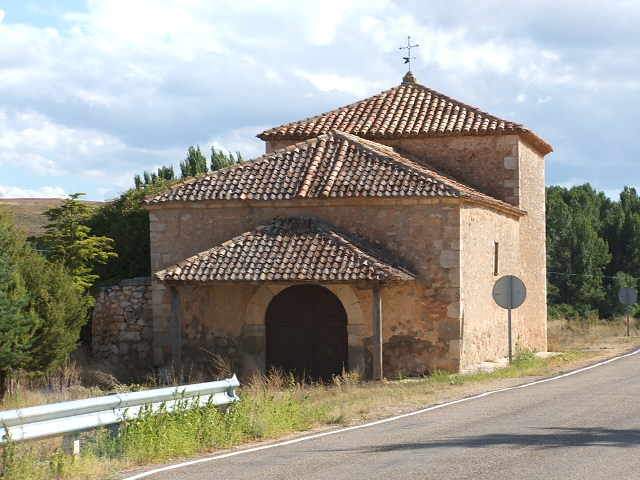
Nuestra Señora de la Soledad hermitage.
