= Ermita de San Miguel de Gormaz =

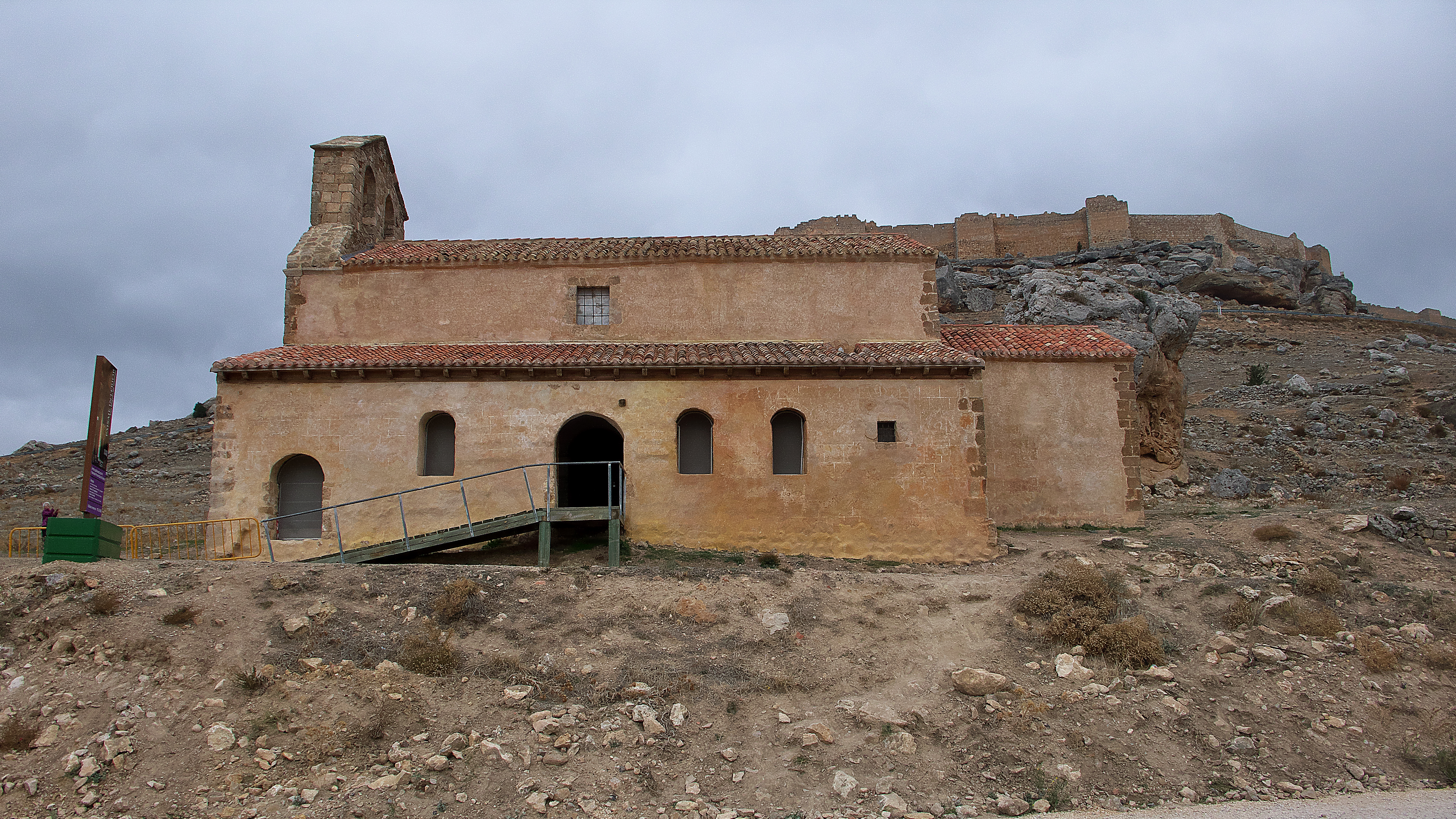

- Location within Spain
- 41.490987°N 3.0104°W
- Location: Gormaz, Spain

Spanish Cultural Heritage
- Official name: Ermita de San Miguel de Gormaz
- Type: Non-movable
- Criteria: Monument
- Designated: 1996
- Reference no.: RI-51-0009156

The Ermita de San Miguel de Gormaz is a hermitage located in Gormaz, Spain. It was declared Bien de Interés Cultural in 1996.
