= Gormaz =

- Municipality
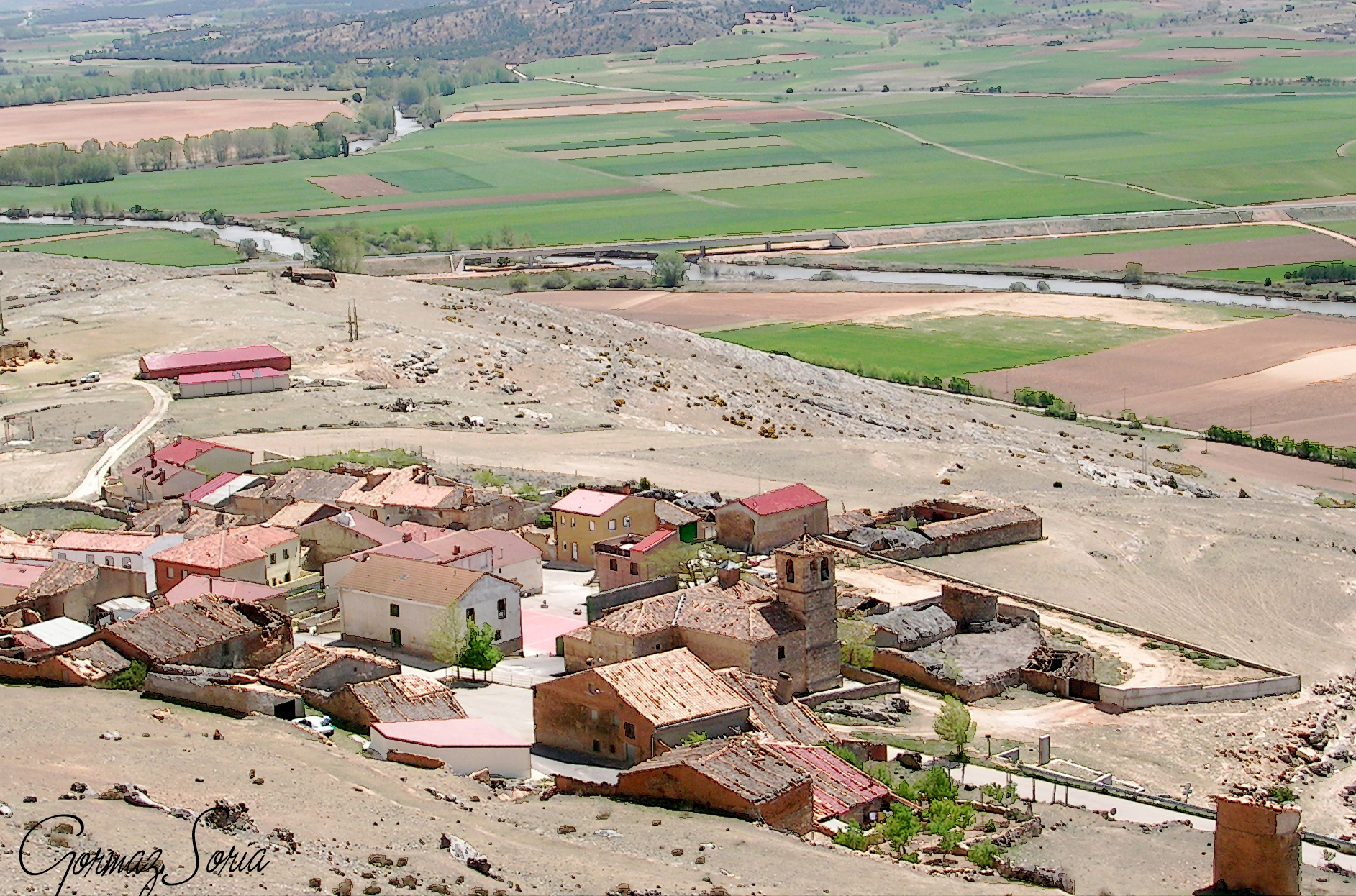
- View from the hill.

- Gormaz in Soria

- Location in Spain. Gormaz (Spain)
- Country: Spain
- Autonomous community: Castile and León
- Province: Soria
- Municipality: Gormaz

Area
  - Total: 15.72 km^{2} (6.07 sq mi)

Population (2025-01-01)
  - Total: 18
  - Density: 1.1/km^{2} (3.0/sq mi)
- Time zone: UTC+1 (CET)
  - Summer (DST): UTC+2 (CEST)
- Website: Official website

Gormaz is a municipality located in the province of Soria, Castile and León, Spain. According to the 2004 census (INE), the municipality has a population of 19 inhabitants. The Arab Gormaz Castle is the oldest and largest citadel in Western Europe of its time.
