= San Juan de Rabanera =

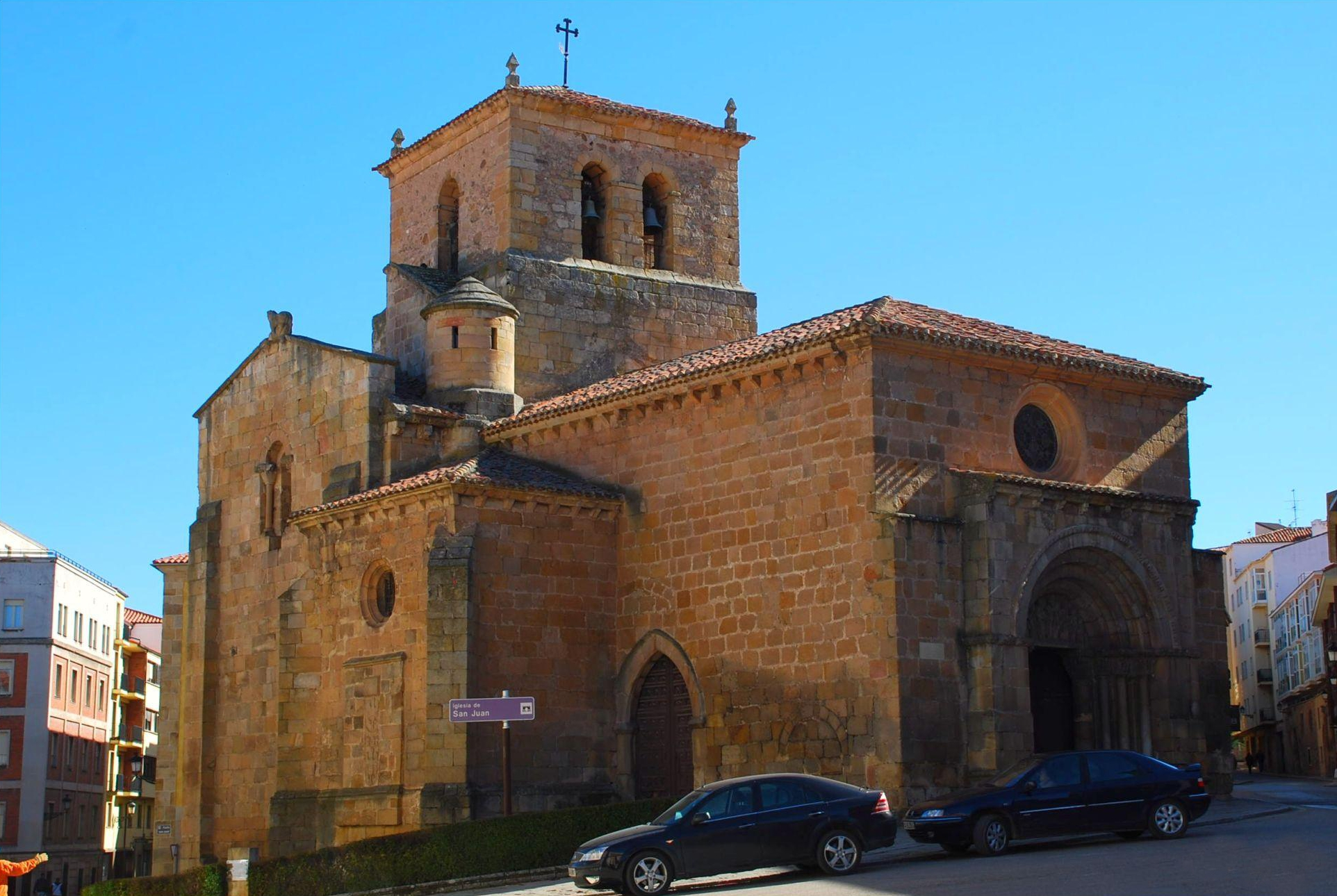

- Location within Spain
- 41.762694°N 2.465465°W
- Location: Soria, Spain

Spanish Cultural Heritage
- Official name: Iglesia de San Juan de Rabanera
- Type: Non-movable
- Criteria: Monument
- Designated: 1929
- Reference no.: RI-51-0000337

The San Juan de Rabanera is a Romanesque-style, Roman Catholic church located in Soria, Spain. It was declared Bien de Interés Cultural in 1929.

Construction began in the 12th century, but the church has been refurbished since, and had the addition of chapels. The highly sculpted main portal derives from the razed church of San Nicolás, moved here in 1908. The apse has flat striated pillars, one of which forms the axis of symmetry, separating two windows with semi-circular arches as opposed to the most common single one.

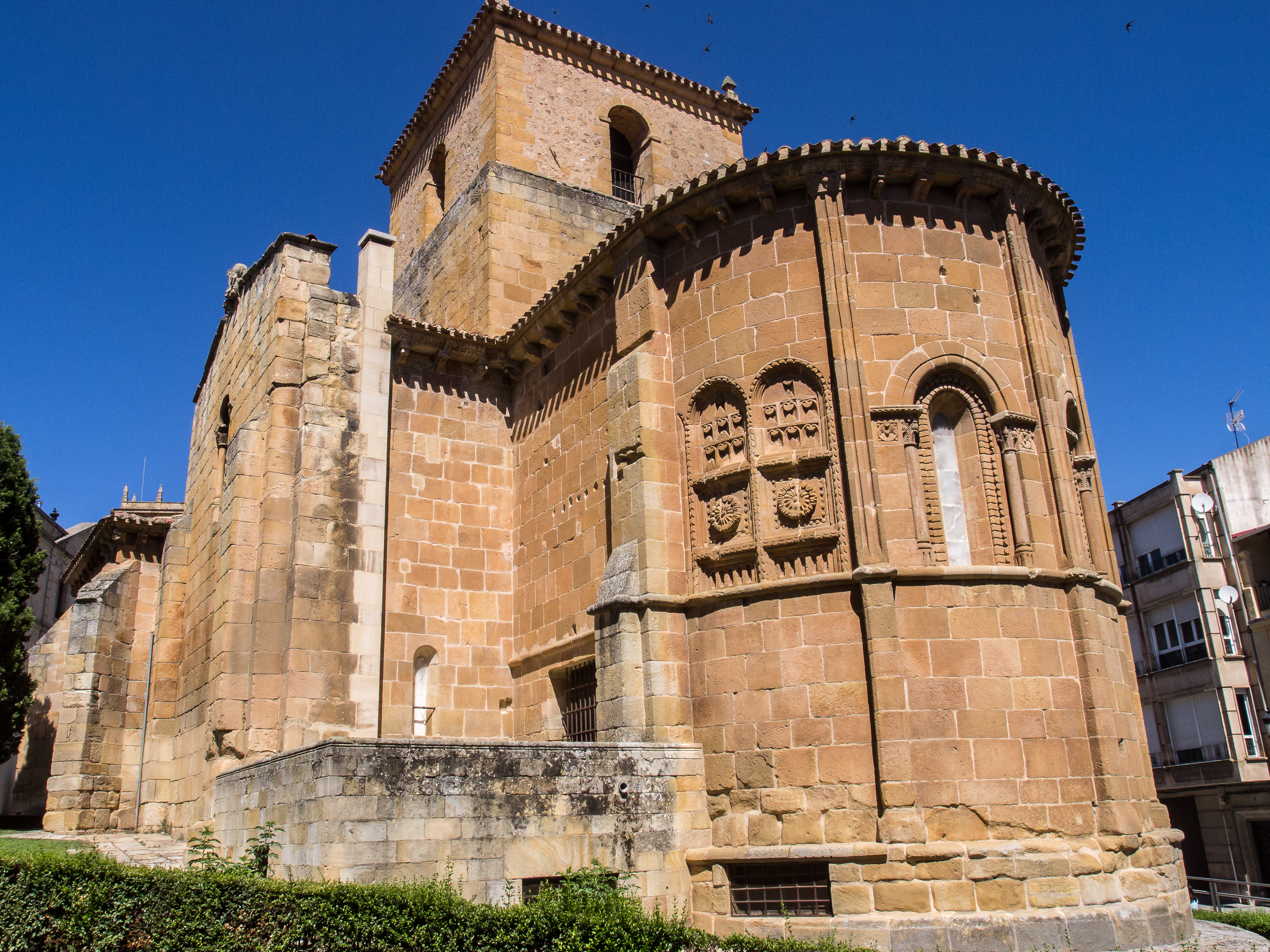
Apse

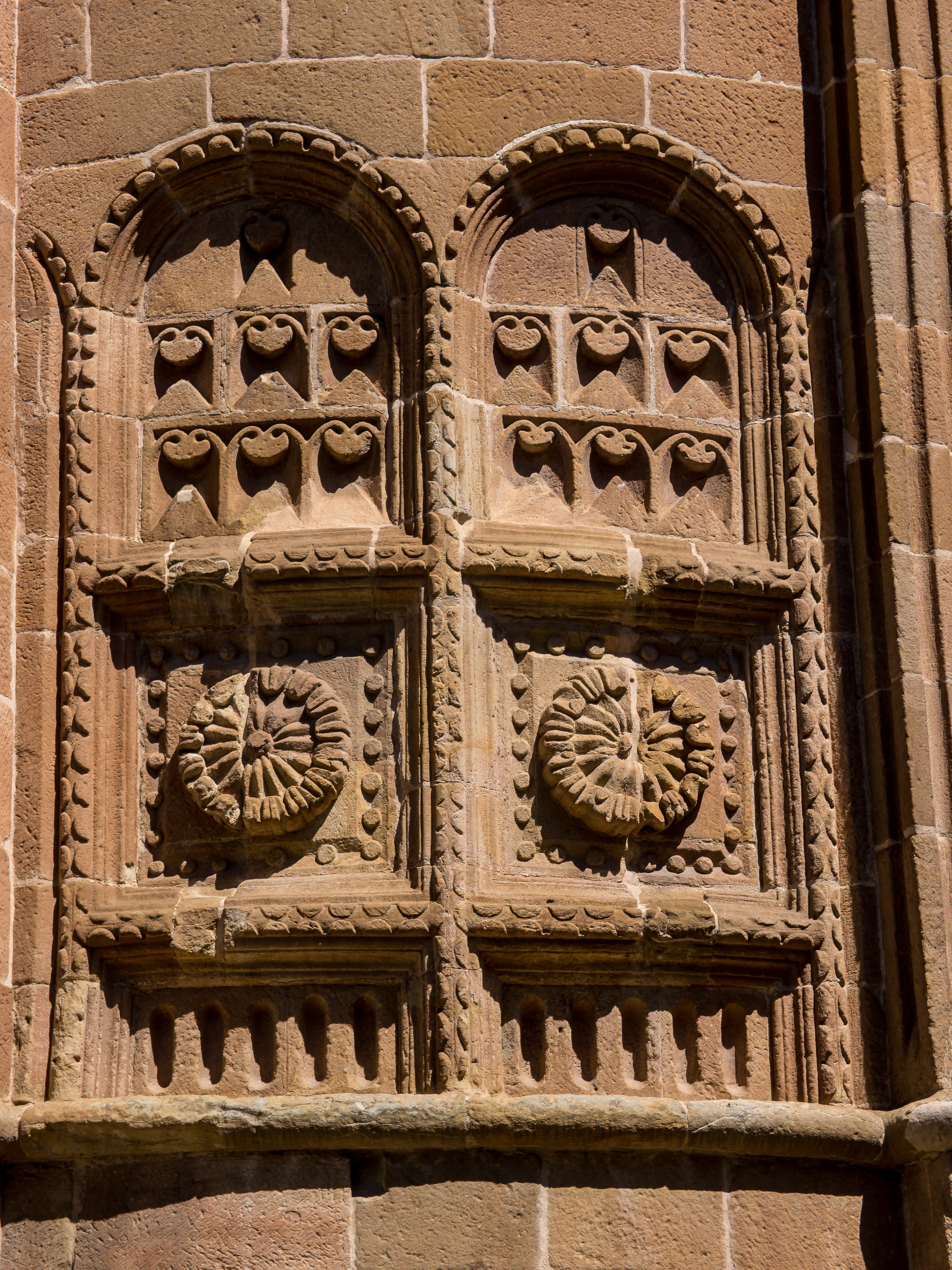
Decorated blind windows

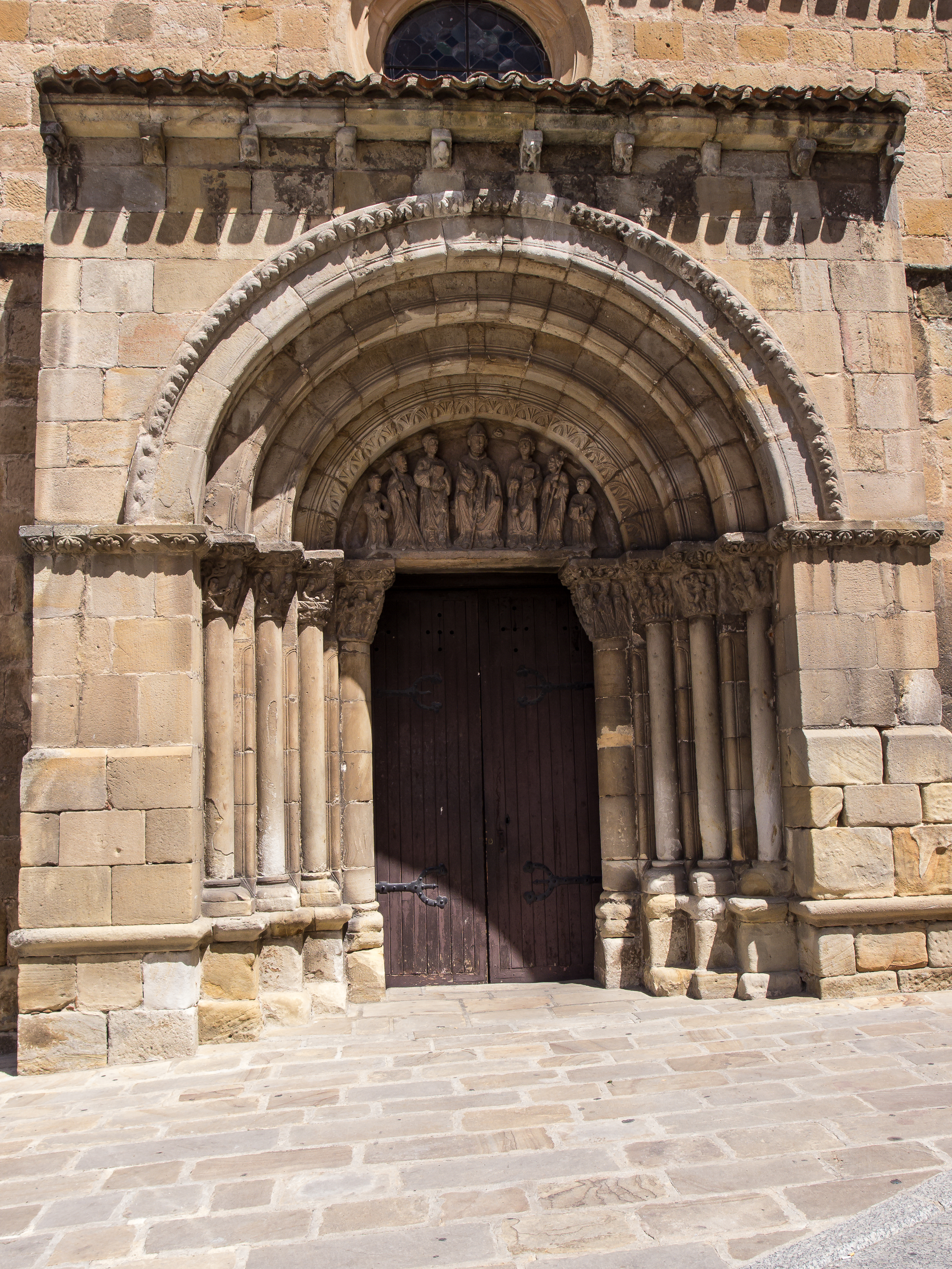
Main portal

The interior has gothic elements, but the rounded apse has Romanesque window moldings.
