= St Peter's church, Caracena =

San Pedro de Caracena
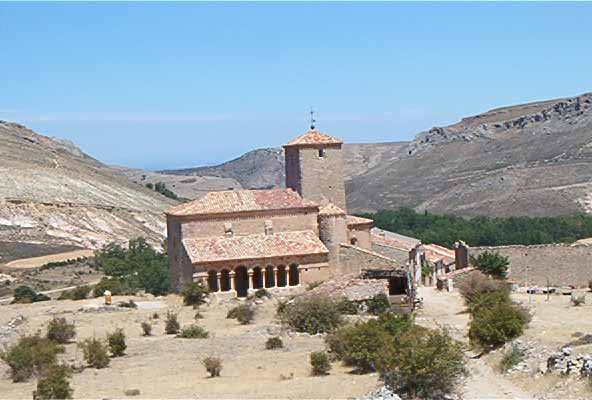

- Location within Spain
- 41.382504°N 3.092292°W
- Location: Caracena, Spain

Spanish Cultural Heritage
- Official name: Iglesia de San Pedro
- Type: Non-movable
- Criteria: Monument
- Designated: 1935
- Reference no.: RI-51-0001093

St Peter's church (Spanish: Iglesia de San Pedro) is one of two Romanesque-style, Roman Catholic churches located in Caracena, Spain. The 12th-century church is most notable for the carvings on the capitals on the columns of the atrium, and in pedestals on the cornice.

== Conservation ==
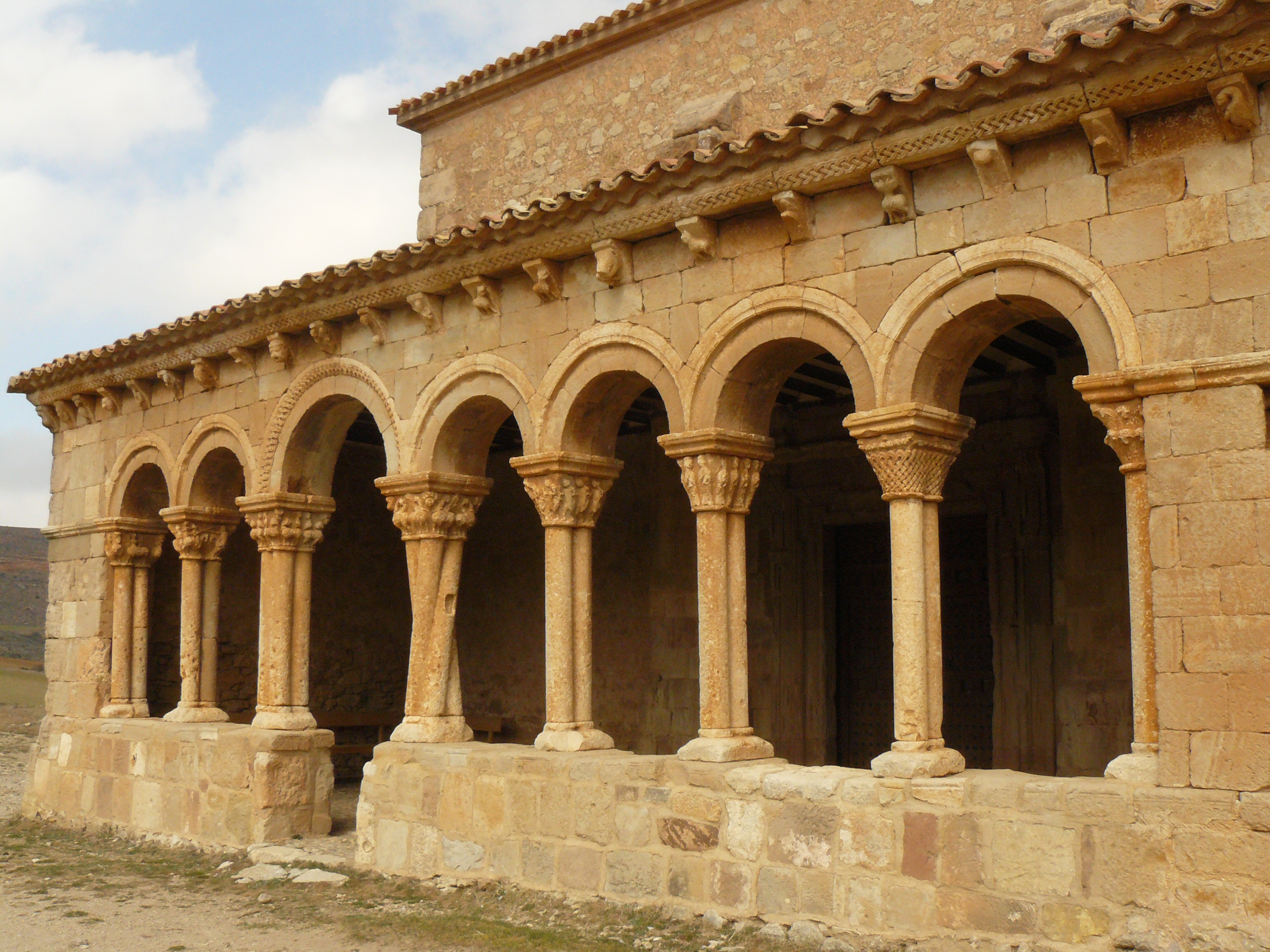
Atrium of the church

It has been designated a Bien de Interés Cultural, and has been protected by a heritage listing since 1935.
