= Blas Taracena Aguirre =

Spanish archaeologist (1895–1951)

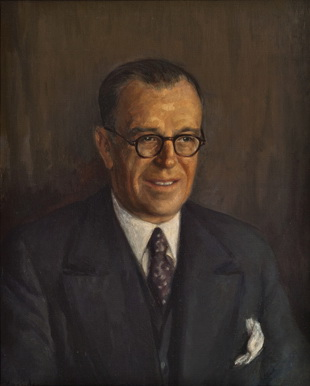
- Born: Martín Almagro Basch; 1895, December 1 Soria Spain
- Died: 1951, February 1 Madrid Spain
- Occupation: archaeologist
- Employer: Museo Arqueológico Nacional de España

Blas Taracena Aguirre (Soria, 1 December 1895 – Madrid, 1 February 1951), Spanish archaeologist.

== Biography ==
Blas Taracena Aguirre directed the Museum Numantino (Soria, Spain) and excavations at Numantia. His investigations covered the near zones of Soria, as well as Rioja and mainly Navarra. He continued the works of his teacher José Ramón Mélida, headed the Museum Numantino and held important positions in the National Archaeological Museum of Spain.

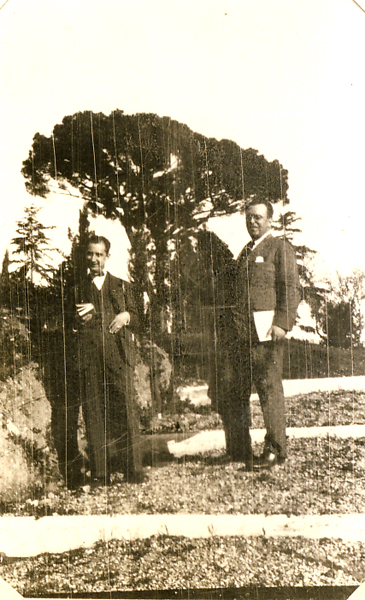
Blas Taracena Aguirre (right)

In 1939 he was appointed the Director of the National Archaeologic Museum of Spain, till 1943 he was the Secretary of the Institute of the CSIC.

He is the author of an extensive bibliography and has been awarded with several national and international awards. 1918–1919 he was deputy director of regional magazine Castilla in Soria.

== Works ==
- Carta arqueológica de España: Soria, 1941
- Vías romanas del Alto Duero, 1934.
- Reseña histórico-artística de la provincia de Salamanca (póstumo, 1982), con César Morán Bardón

== Bibliography ==
- Pasamar Alzuria, Gonzalo; Peiró Martín, Ignacio (2002). Diccionario Akal de Historiadores españoles contemporáneos. Ediciones Akal. ISBN 978-84-460-1489-8.
