= Pozalmuro =

- Municipality
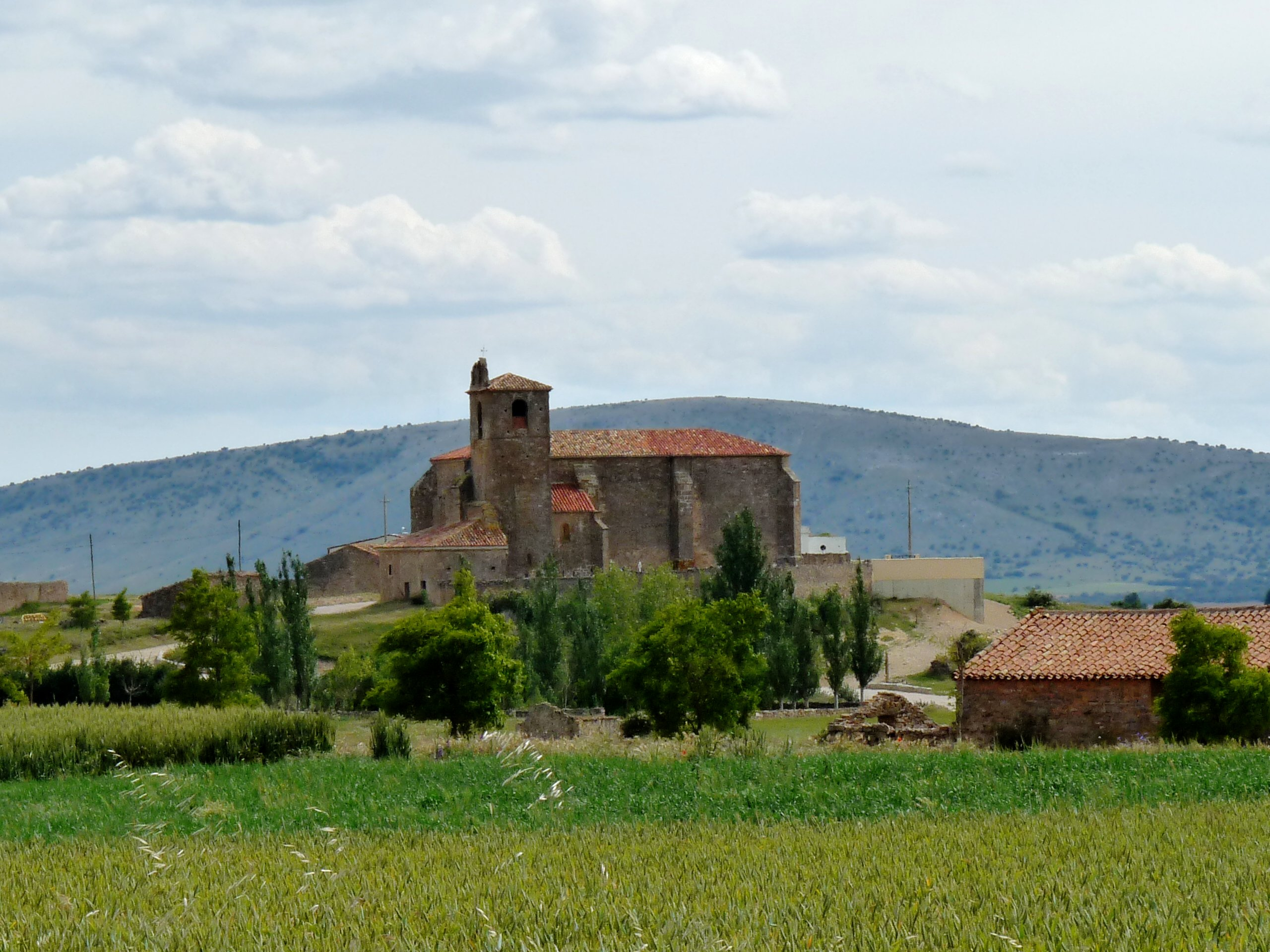
- View of the Church of Santa María la Mayor in Pozalmuro

- Municipality of Pozalmuro

- Location in Spain. Pozalmuro (Spain)
- Coordinates: 41°46′28″N 2°06′07″W
- Country: Spain
- Autonomous community: Castile and León
- Province: Soria
- Municipality: Pozalmuro

Area
  - Total: 36 km^{2} (14 sq mi)

Population (2025-01-01)
  - Total: 49
  - Density: 1.4/km^{2} (3.5/sq mi)
- Time zone: UTC+1 (CET)
  - Summer (DST): UTC+2 (CEST)
- Website: Official website

Pozalmuro is a municipality located in the province of Soria, Castile and León, Spain. According to the 2004 census (INE), the municipality has a population of 102 inhabitants.
