= Palace of los Condes de Gómara =

- Palacio de los Condes de Gómara (Spanish)
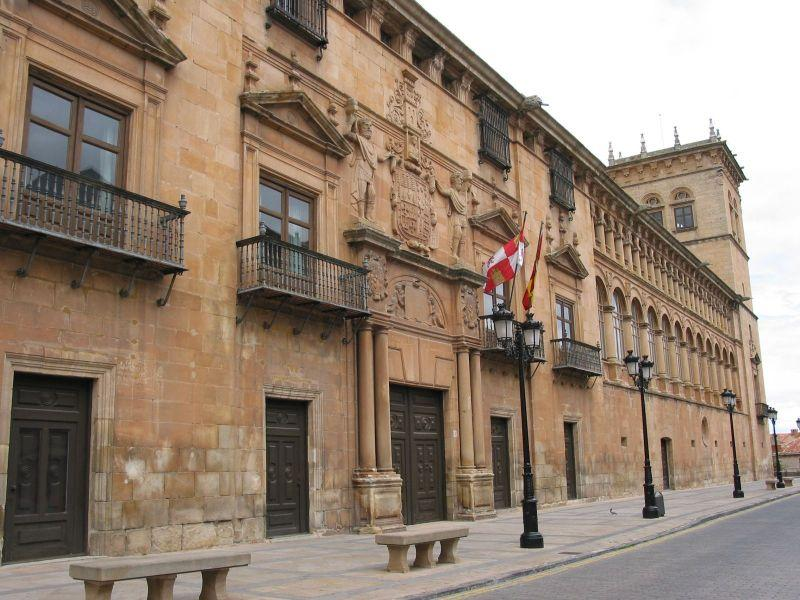

- Location within Spain
- 41.764641°N 2.464611°W
- Location: Soria, Spain

Spanish Cultural Heritage
- Official name: Palacio de los Condes de Gómara
- Type: Non-movable
- Criteria: Monument
- Designated: 1949
- Reference no.: RI-51-0001220

The Palace of the Counts of Gómara (Spanish: Palacio de los Condes de Gómara) is a 16th-century palace located in Soria, Spain.

It is the most representative building of Renaissance civil architecture of the city of Soria.

== Conservation ==
The building is protected by the heritage listing Bien de Interés Cultural and has been protected since 1949.
