= Tramacastilla =

- municipality
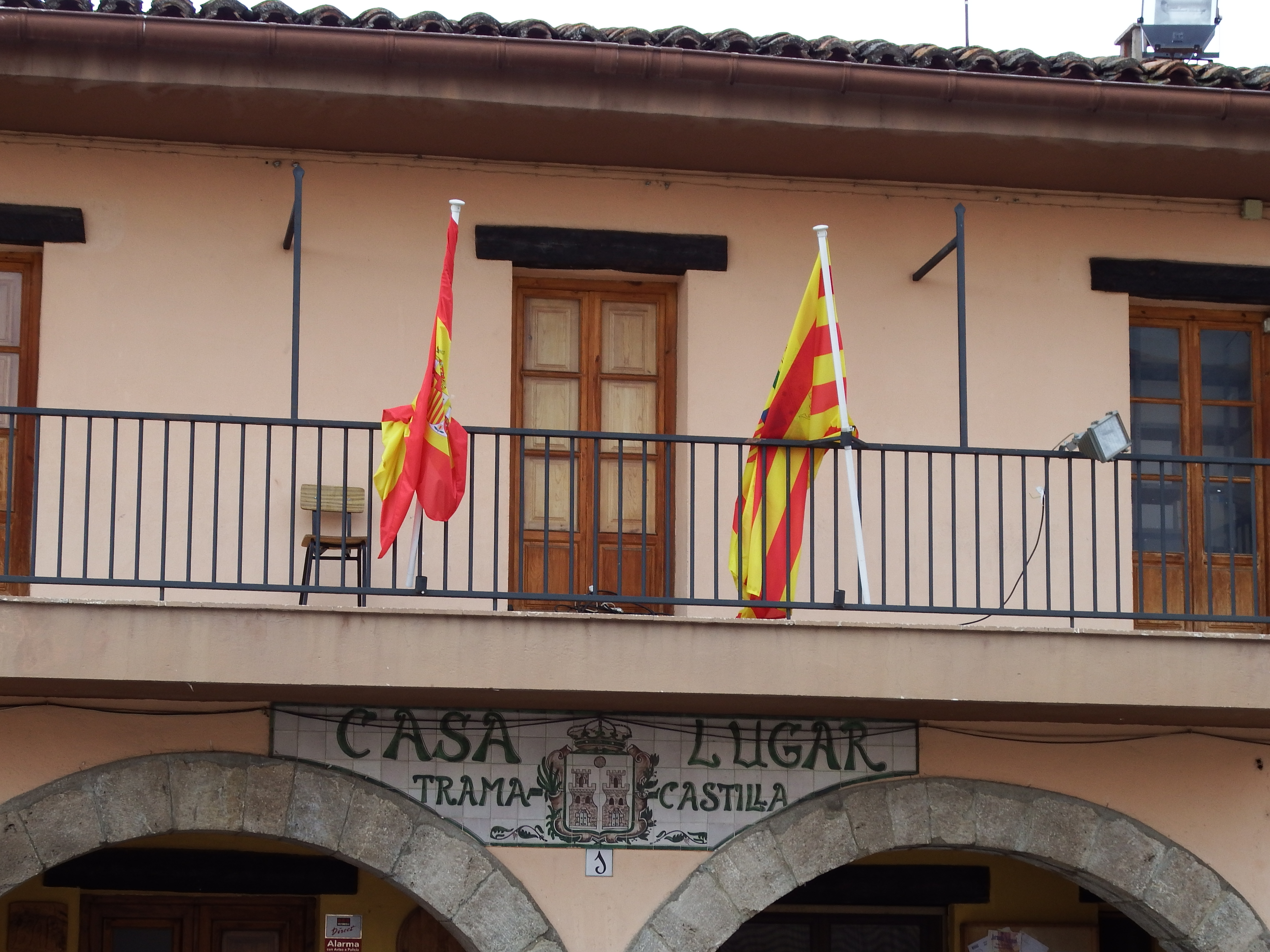
- Town hall

- Coat of arms

- Location within Spain
- Coordinates: 40°26′N 1°34′W
- Country: Spain
- Autonomous community: Aragon
- Province: Teruel

Area
  - Total: 24.81 km^{2} (9.58 sq mi)
- Elevation: 1,260 m (4,130 ft)

Population (2025-01-01)
  - Total: 133
  - Density: 5.36/km^{2} (13.9/sq mi)
- Time zone: UTC+1 (CET)
  - Summer (DST): UTC+2 (CEST)

Tramacastilla is a municipality located in the province of Teruel, Aragon, Spain. According to the 2004 census (INE), the municipality had a population of 133 inhabitants.

== See also ==
- List of municipalities in Teruel
