= Palace of los Ríos y Salcedo =

- Palacio de los Ríos y Salcedo (Spanish)
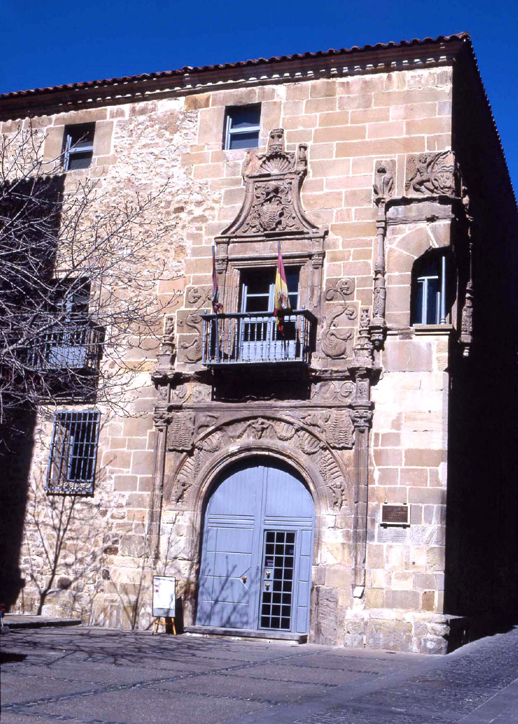

- Location within Spain
- 41.764591°N 2.467143°W
- Location: Soria, Spain

Spanish Cultural Heritage
- Official name: Palacio de los Ríos y Salcedo
- Type: Non-movable
- Criteria: Monument
- Designated: 1982
- Reference no.: RI-51-0004615

The Palace of los Ríos y Salcedo (Spanish: Palacio de los Ríos y Salcedo) is a palace located in Soria, Spain. It was declared Bien de Interés Cultural in 1982.
