= Iglesia de la Virgen del Rivero =

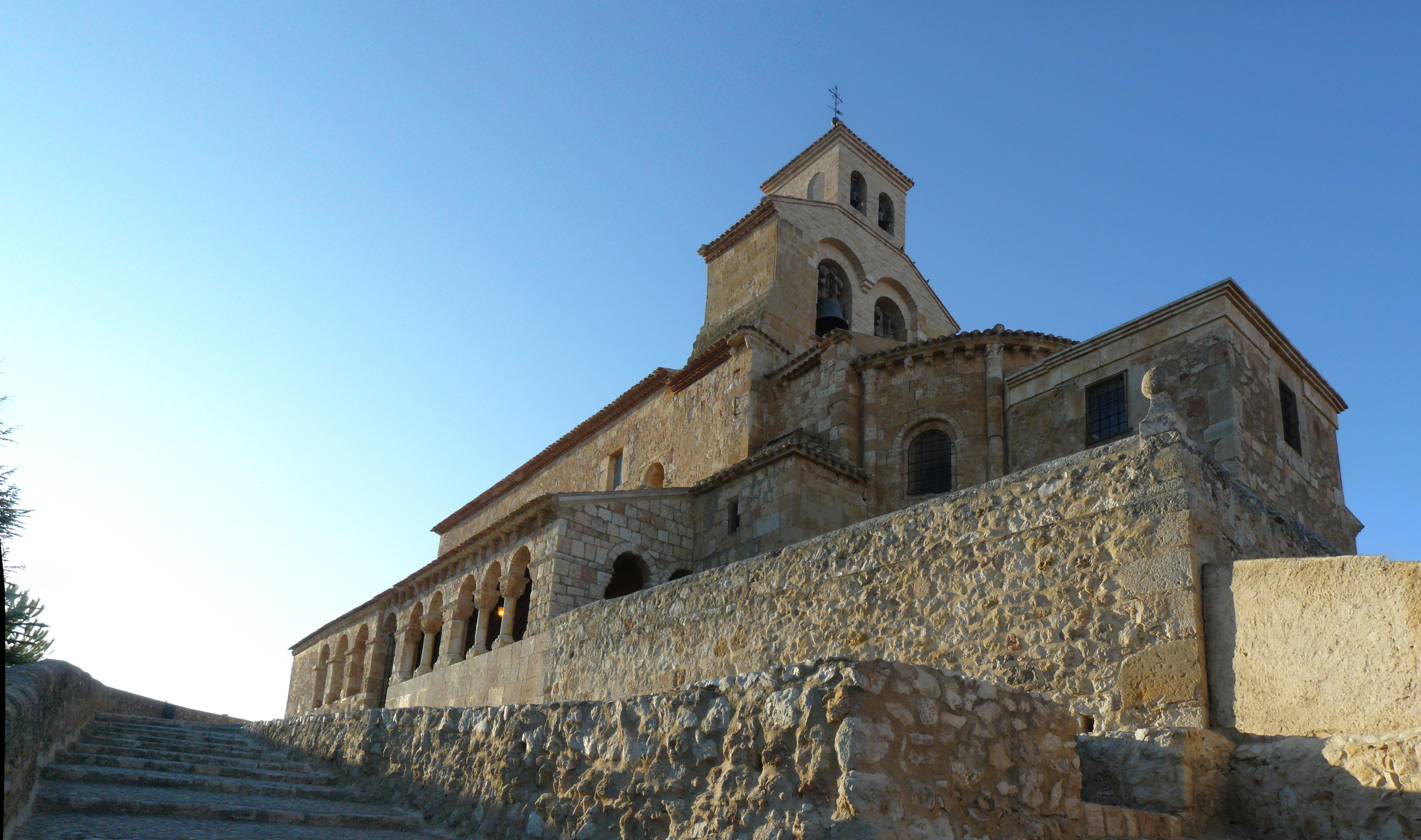

- Location within Spain
- 41.575097°N 3.208415°W
- Location: San Esteban de Gormaz, Spain

Spanish Cultural Heritage
- Official name: Iglesia de la Virgen del Rivero
- Type: Non-movable
- Criteria: Monument
- Designated: 1996
- Reference no.: RI-51-0009071

The Iglesia de la Virgen del Rivero is a Romanesque church located in San Esteban de Gormaz, Spain.

== Conservation ==
It was declared Bien de Interés Cultural in 1996.

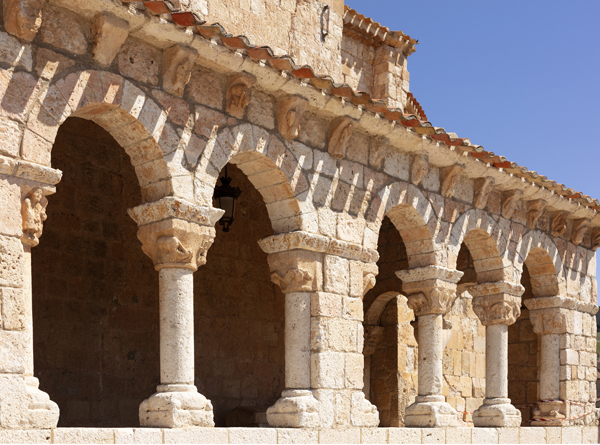
Exterior

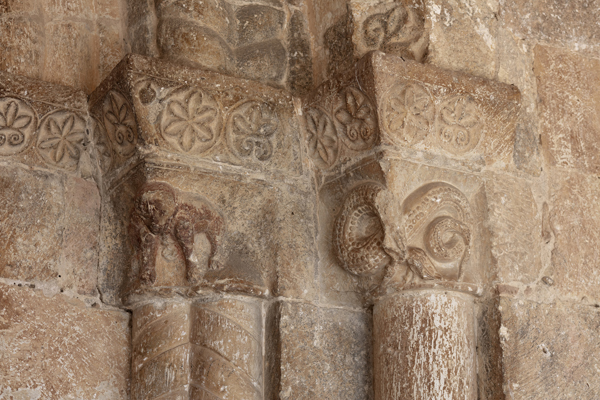
Capitals

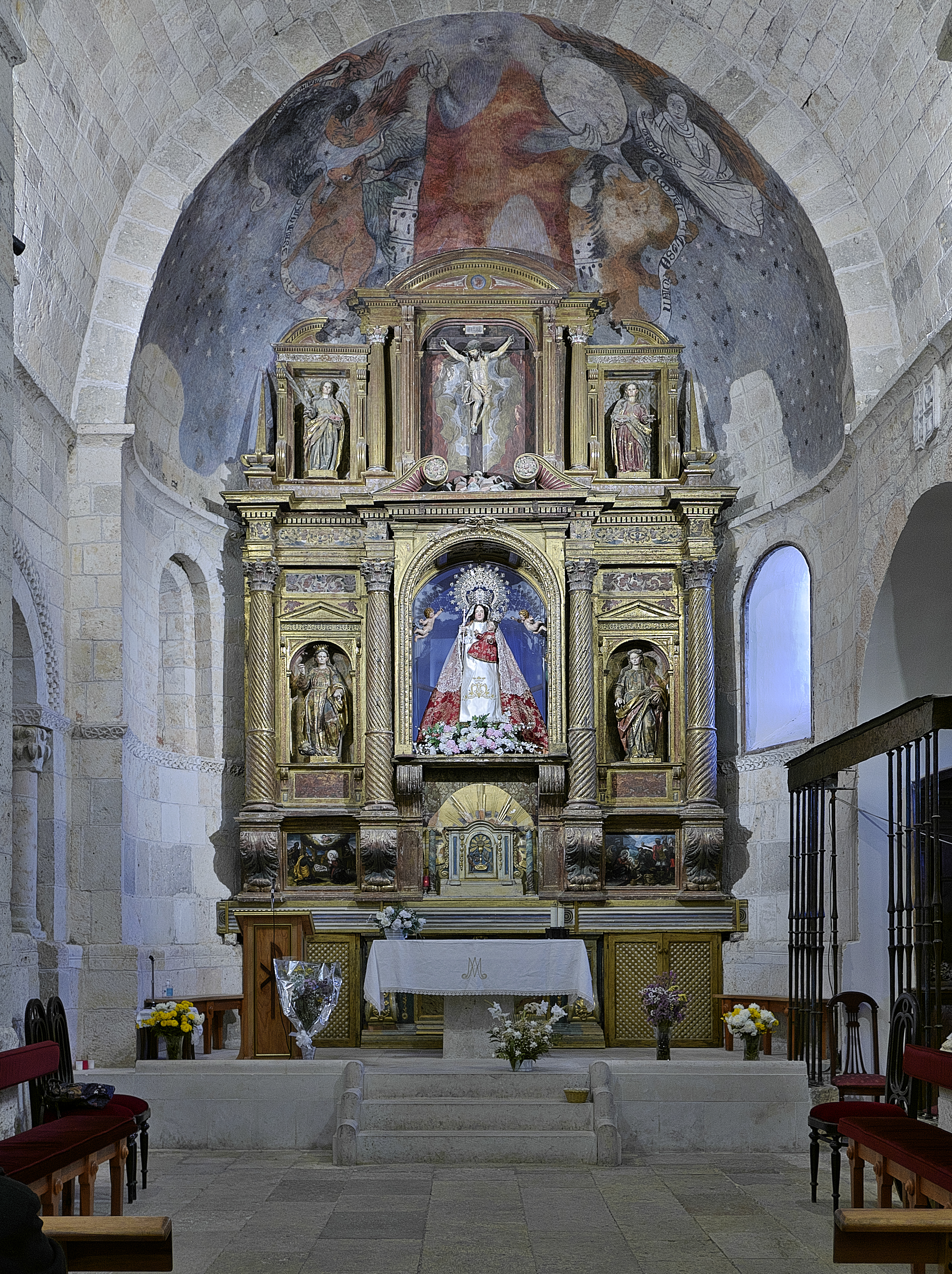
Altarpiece
