= Bordecorex =

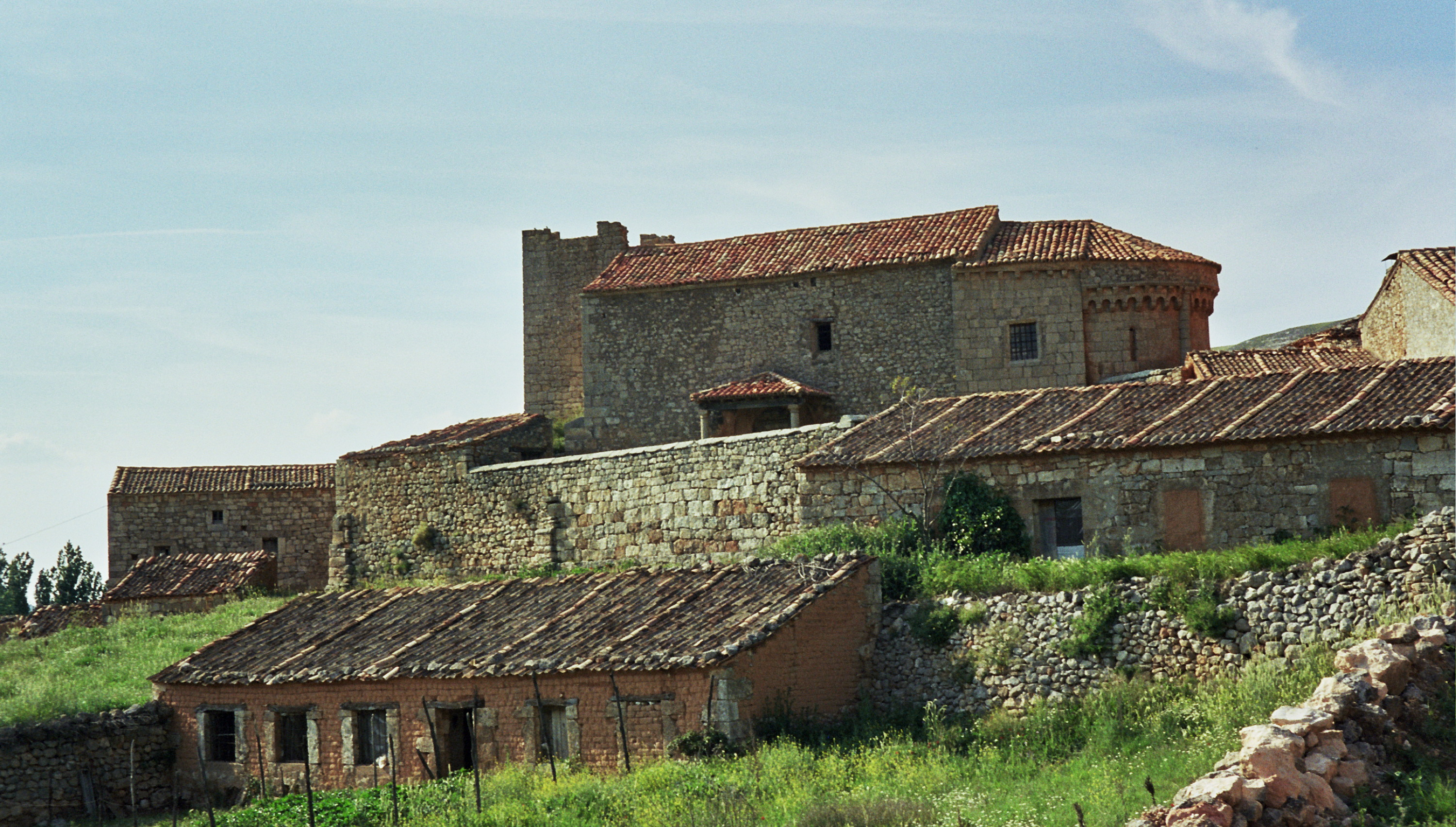
- The church and some houses in Bordecorex

- Location in Spain
- Coordinates: 41°22′38″N 2°15′39″W
- Country: Spain
- Province: Soria
- Municipality: Caltojar
- Elevation: 979 m (3,212 ft)

Population (2017)
  - Total: 7
- Time zone: UTC+1 (CET)
  - Summer (DST): UTC+2 (CEST)

Bordecorex is a village under the local government of the municipality of Caltojar, in Soria, Spain. The population in 2010 was 11.
