= San Nicolás de Soria =

Coordinates: 41.7649°N 2.4603°W

Church of San Nicolás
- Ruinas de la Iglesia de San Nicolás (Spanish)
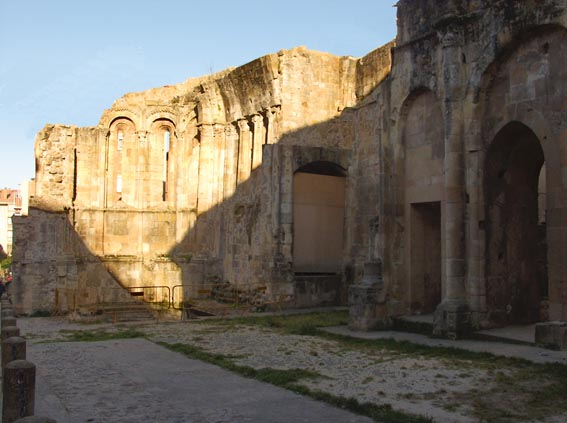

- Location within Spain
- Location: Soria, Spain

Spanish Cultural Heritage
- Official name: Ruinas de la Iglesia de San Nicolás
- Type: Non-movable
- Criteria: Monument
- Designated: 1962
- Reference no.: RI-51-0001431

The Church of San Nicolás de Soria (Spanish: Iglesia de San Nicolás) is now only ruined remnants of a Romanesque-style, Roman Catholic, former church located in Soria, Spain. It was declared Bien de Interés Cultural in 1962.

Part of the apse and some side walls remain: in 1858, the nave roof was brought down. In 1908, the portal of the church was moved to the church of San Juan de Rabanera in Soria. Finally in 1933 further unstable walls were razed. In 1978, during some restoration works, frescoes depicting the murder of Saint Thomas of Canterbury were discovered in one of the remaining walls of the church.
