= Monteagudo de las Vicarías =

- Municipality
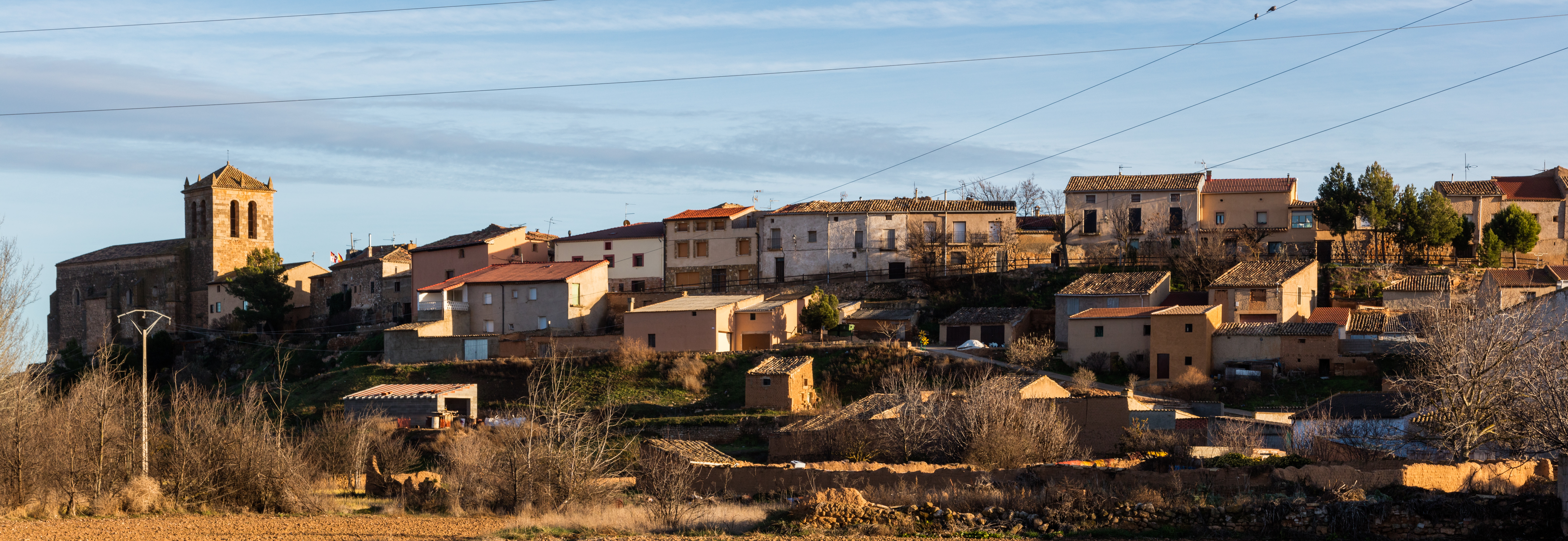
- View of Monteagudo de las Vicarías, Soria, Spain

- Location in Spain. Monteagudo de las Vicarías (Spain)
- Coordinates: 41°21′53″N 2°10′05″W
- Country: Spain
- Autonomous community: Castile and León
- Province: Soria
- Municipality: Monteagudo de las Vicarías

Area
  - Total: 96 km^{2} (37 sq mi)
- Elevation: 794 m (2,605 ft)

Population (2025-01-01)
  - Total: 169
  - Density: 1.8/km^{2} (4.6/sq mi)
- Time zone: UTC+1 (CET)
  - Summer (DST): UTC+2 (CEST)
- Website: Official website

Monteagudo de las Vicarías is a municipality located in the province of Soria, Castile and León, Spain. According to the 2004 census (INE), the municipality has a population of 268 inhabitants.
