= Comarca de Almazán =

Coordinates: 41.4479°N 2.5242°W

Almazán
- Comarca
- Coat of arms
- Country: Spain
- Autonomous community: Castile and Leon
- Province: Soria
- Capital: Almazán
- Municipalities: List: Adradas, Alentisque, Almazán, Barca, Barcones, Borjabad, Centenera de Andaluz, Coscurita, Escobosa de Almazán, Frechilla de Almazán, Maján, Matamala de Almazán, Momblona, Morón de Almazán, Nepas, Nolay, Rello, Soliedra, Taroda, Velamazán, Velilla de los Ajos, Viana de Duero
- Time zone: UTC+1 (CET)
  - Summer (DST): UTC+2 (CEST)
- Largest municipality: Almazán

Comarca de Almazán is a comarca of the province of Soria, in Castile and Leon (Spain). It has 22 municipalities located in the centre-south of the province.

The capital of the comarca is Almazán.
