= Adradas =

- Municipality
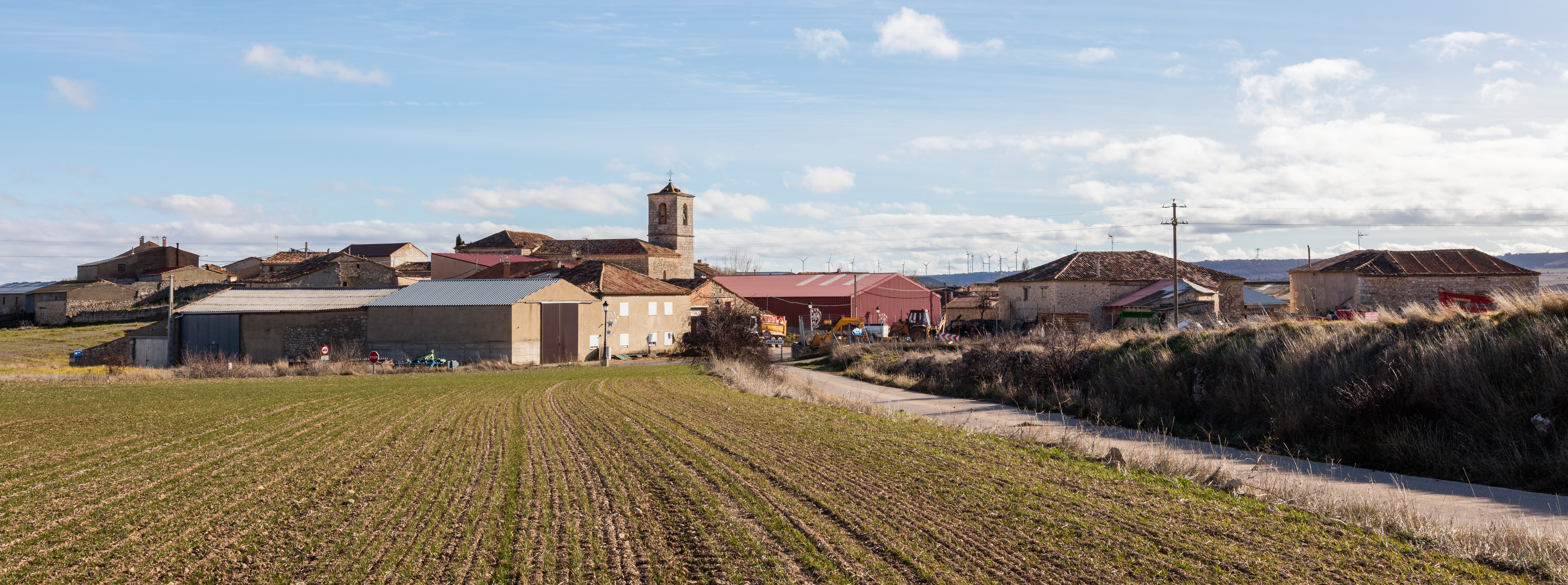
- Adradas

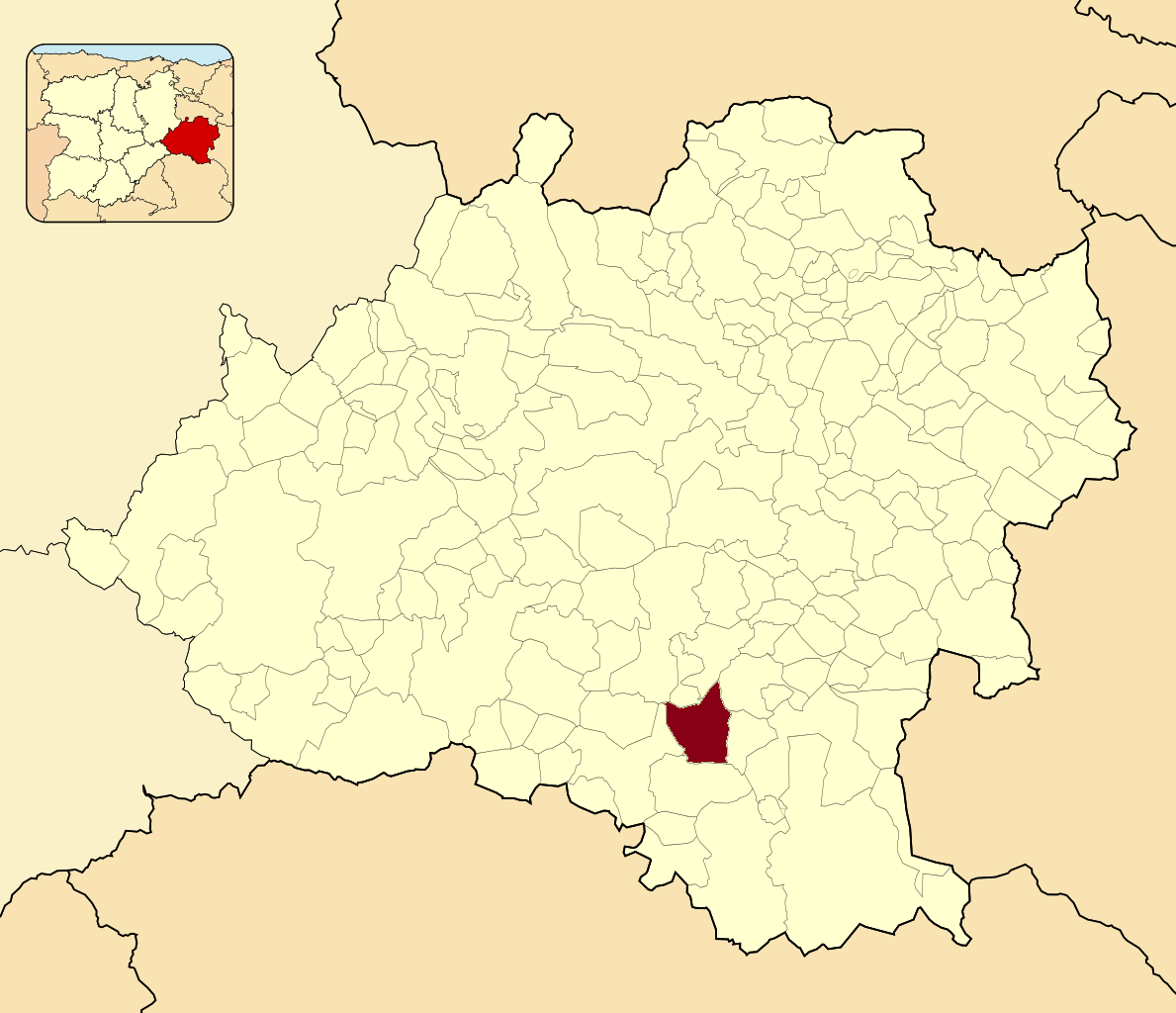
- Municipal location in the Province of Soria.

- Location in Spain. Adradas (Spain)
- Coordinates: 41°21′02″N 2°28′24″W
- Country: Spain
- Autonomous community: Castilla y León
- Province: Soria
- Comarca: Almazán

Government
  - Alcalde: César Huerta Hernando (2019–2023) (PPSO)

Area
  - Total: 67.47 km^{2} (26.05 sq mi)
- Elevation: 1,051 m (3,448 ft)

Population (2025-01-01)
  - Total: 65
- Time zone: UTC+1 (CET)
  - Summer (DST): UTC+2 (CEST)
- Postal code: 42

Adradas is a municipality in the Province of Soria, Castile and León, Spain, 18.2 kilometres (11.3 mi) south of Almazán and 193 kilometres (120 mi) southeast of Burgos by road. It lies at 1,051 metres (3,448 ft) in altitude, to the south of a small hill. Nearby villages include Sauquillo del Campo, Ontalvilla de Almazán, Señuela, Taroda, Centenera de Andaluz and Radona. As of 2018, the municipality has a population of 44 inhabitants.

Adradas belongs to the Roman Catholic Diocese of Osma-Soria, although once belonged to the bishopric of Sigüenza. Administratively it lies in the Comarca of Almazán and relies on its main town for jurisdiction. The San Roque Hospital for the poor was founded in 1559 by pastor Alonso Sanz but no longer operates. The most prominent landmark in the main village is the Parish Church of Santa Eulalia de Mérida. Adradas also contains a plaza, the Casa de la Villa, a park and picnic area and a pond.
