= Escoboza =

Escoboza is a Spanish surname. Notable people with the surname include:

- Alonso Escoboza (born 1993), Mexican footballer
- Jesús Alfonso Huerta Escoboza (1966–2020), Mexican professional wrestler, known professionally as "La Parka (II)"

== See also ==
- Escobosa de Almazán, municipality located in the province of Soria, Spain
