= Centenera (disambiguation) =

Centenera is a municipality located in the province of Guadalajara, Castile-La Mancha, Spain.

Centenera may also refer to:

- Centenera de Andaluz, a municipality located in the province of Soria, Castile and León, Spain.
- Martin del Barco Centenera, a Spanish cleric, explorer and author of the 16th century.
- A street in the city of Buenos Aires, Argentina, named after the Spanish cleric.
- Centenera Fábrica Sudamericana De Envases S.A., a defunct Argentinian company that manufactured tin packaging, part of the Bunge y Born holding.
