= Nolay =

Nolay may refer to:

== Places ==
France

- Nolay, Côte-d'Or
- Nolay, Nièvre

Spain:

- Nolay, Soria, a municipality in Spain

== People ==
- NoLay, British rap artist/singer and songwriter.
- Nolay Piho (林慶台), Atayal pastor and actor who cast as Mona Rudao in the Taiwanese film Warriors of the Rainbow: Seediq Bale.
