= Velamazán =

- Municipality
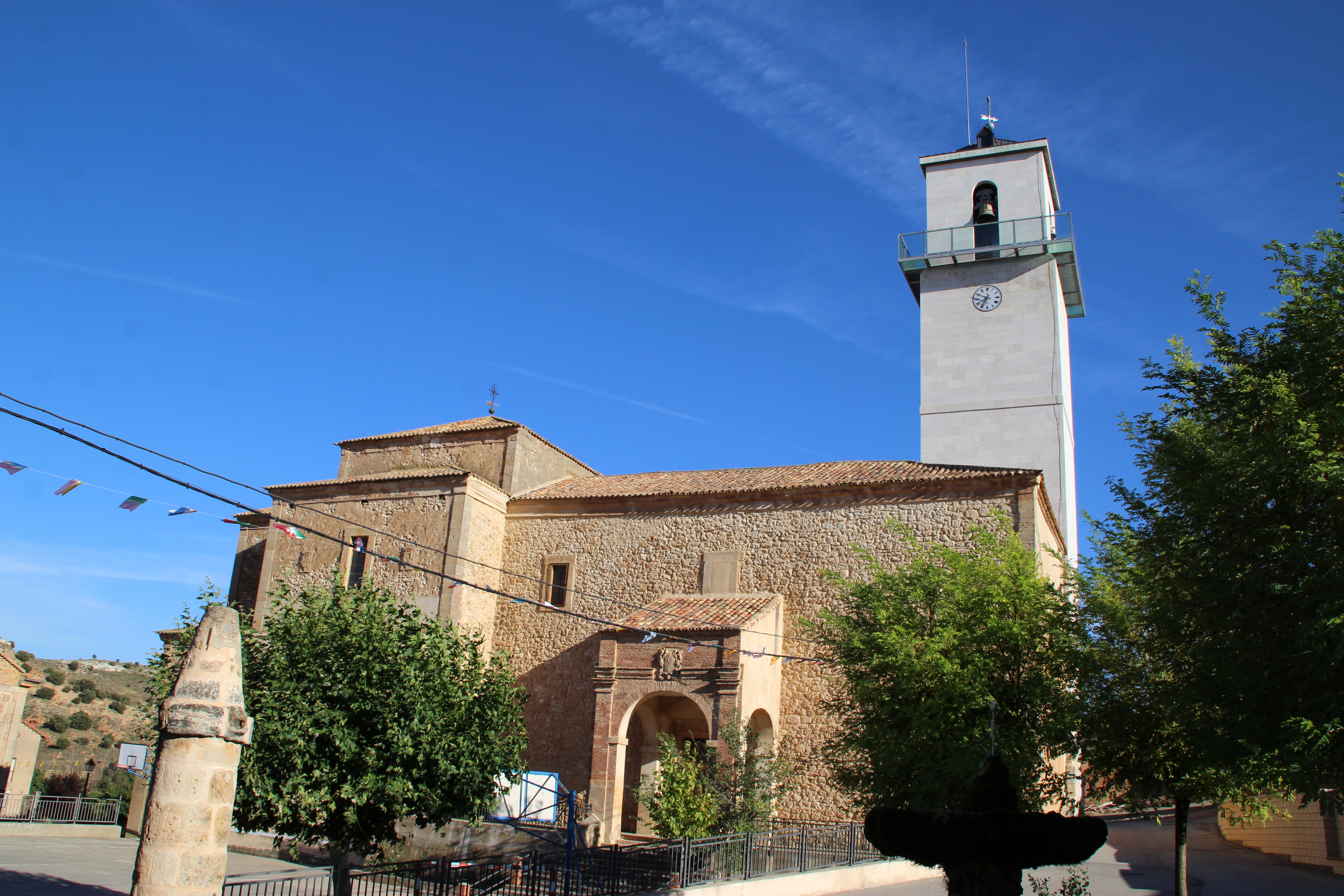
- The Parish Church of the Holy Cross in Velamazán, Soria.

- Location within Castile and León Location within Spain
- Coordinates: 41°26′58″N 2°41′57″W
- Country: Spain
- Autonomous community: Castile and León
- Province: Soria
- Municipality: Velamazán

Area
  - Total: 71.59 km^{2} (27.64 sq mi)

Population (2025-01-01)
  - Total: 66
  - Density: 0.92/km^{2} (2.4/sq mi)
- Time zone: UTC+1 (CET)
  - Summer (DST): UTC+2 (CEST)

Velamazán is a municipality located in the province of Soria, Castile and León, Spain. According to the 2004 census (INE), the municipality had a population of 126 inhabitants.
