= Maján =

- Municipality
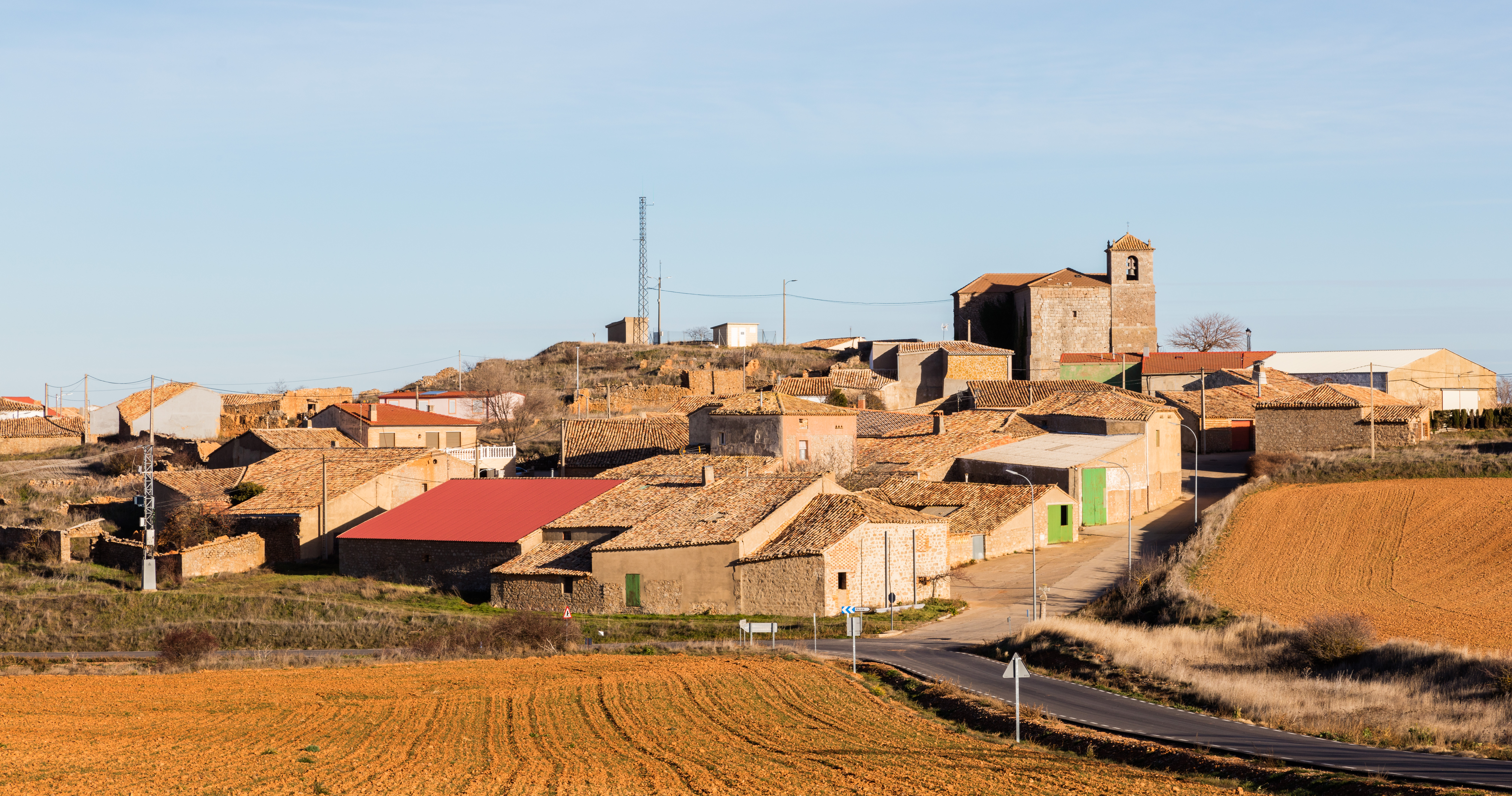
- View of Majan

- Location in Spain. Maján (Spain)
- Coordinates: 41°28′08″N 2°18′11″W
- Country: Spain
- Autonomous community: Castile and León
- Province: Soria
- Municipality: Maján

Area
  - Total: 30 km^{2} (12 sq mi)

Population (2025-01-01)
  - Total: 10
  - Density: 0.33/km^{2} (0.86/sq mi)
- Time zone: UTC+1 (CET)
  - Summer (DST): UTC+2 (CEST)

Maján is a municipality located in the province of Soria, Castile and León, Spain. According to the 2004 census (INE), the municipality has a population of 16 inhabitants.
