= Velilla de los Ajos =

- Municipality
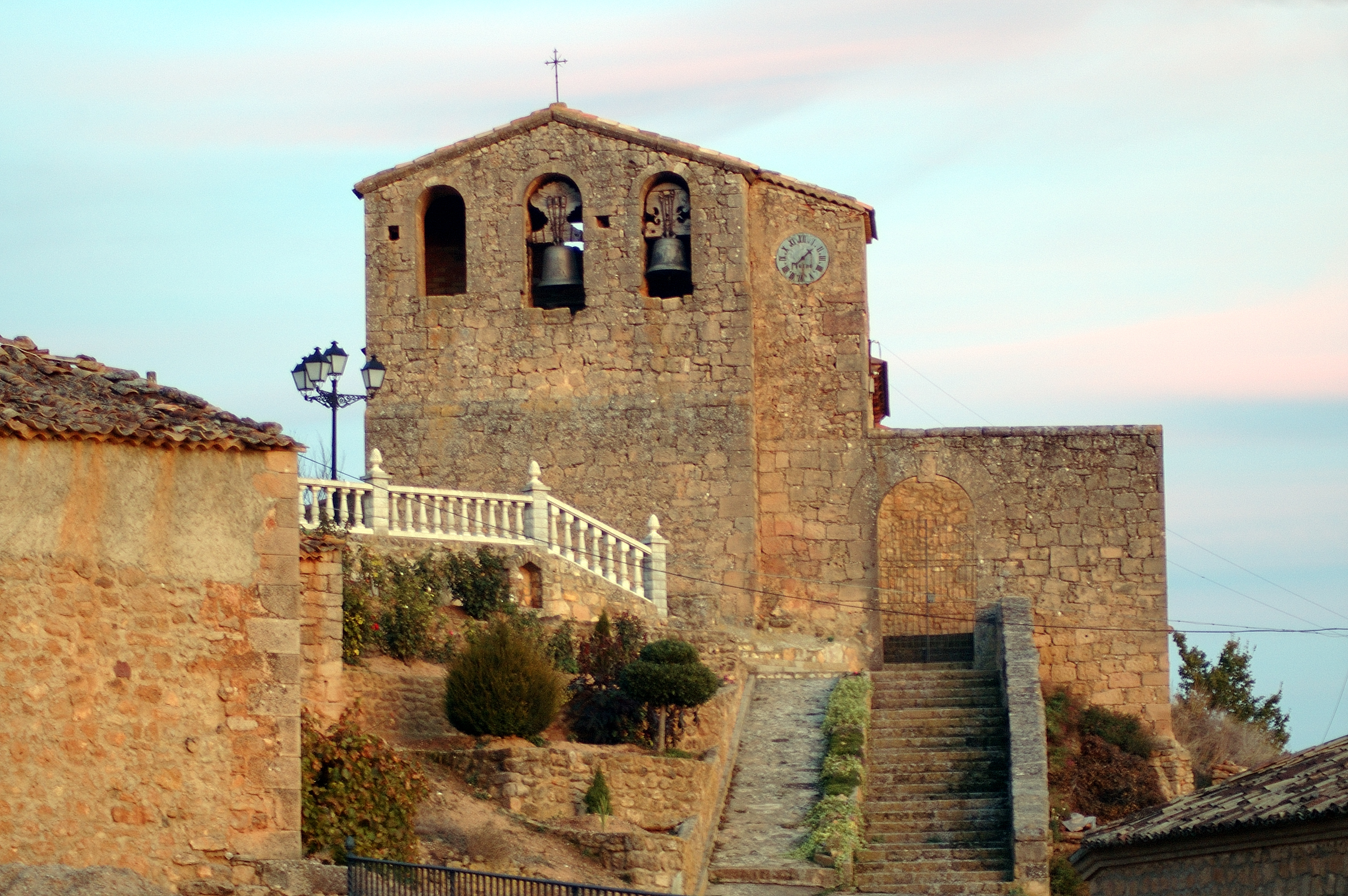
- Church of Velilla de los Ajos

- Location in Spain. Velilla de los Ajos (Spain)
- Coordinates: 41°29′26″N 2°15′17″W
- Country: Spain
- Autonomous community: Castile and León
- Province: Soria
- Municipality: Velilla de los Ajos

Area
  - Total: 19 km^{2} (7.3 sq mi)
- Elevation: 1,005 m (3,297 ft)

Population (2025-01-01)
  - Total: 15
  - Density: 0.79/km^{2} (2.0/sq mi)
- Time zone: UTC+1 (CET)
  - Summer (DST): UTC+2 (CEST)

Velilla de los Ajos is a municipality located in the province of Soria, Castile and León, Spain. According to the 2004 census (INE), the municipality has a population of 41 inhabitants.
