= Coscurita =

- Municipality
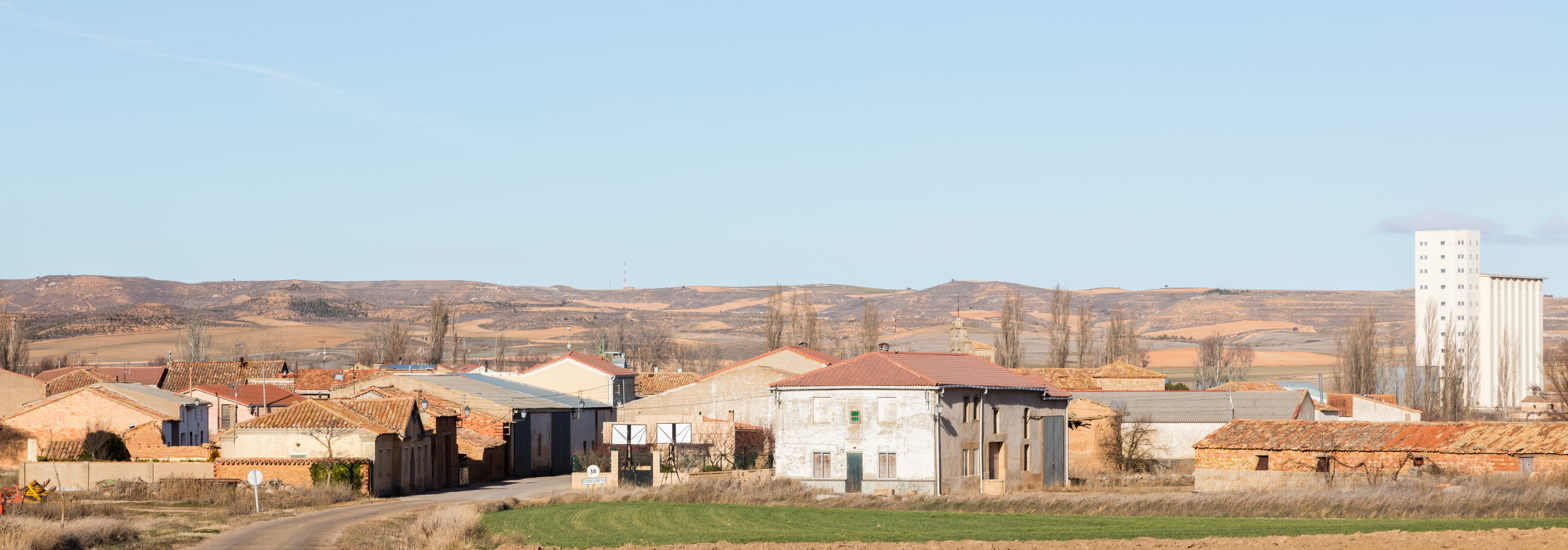

- Location in Spain. Coscurita (Spain)
- Country: Spain
- Autonomous community: Castile and León
- Province: Soria
- Municipality: Coscurita

Area
  - Total: 54 km^{2} (21 sq mi)

Population (2025-01-01)
  - Total: 69
  - Density: 1.3/km^{2} (3.3/sq mi)
- Time zone: UTC+1 (CET)
  - Summer (DST): UTC+2 (CEST)

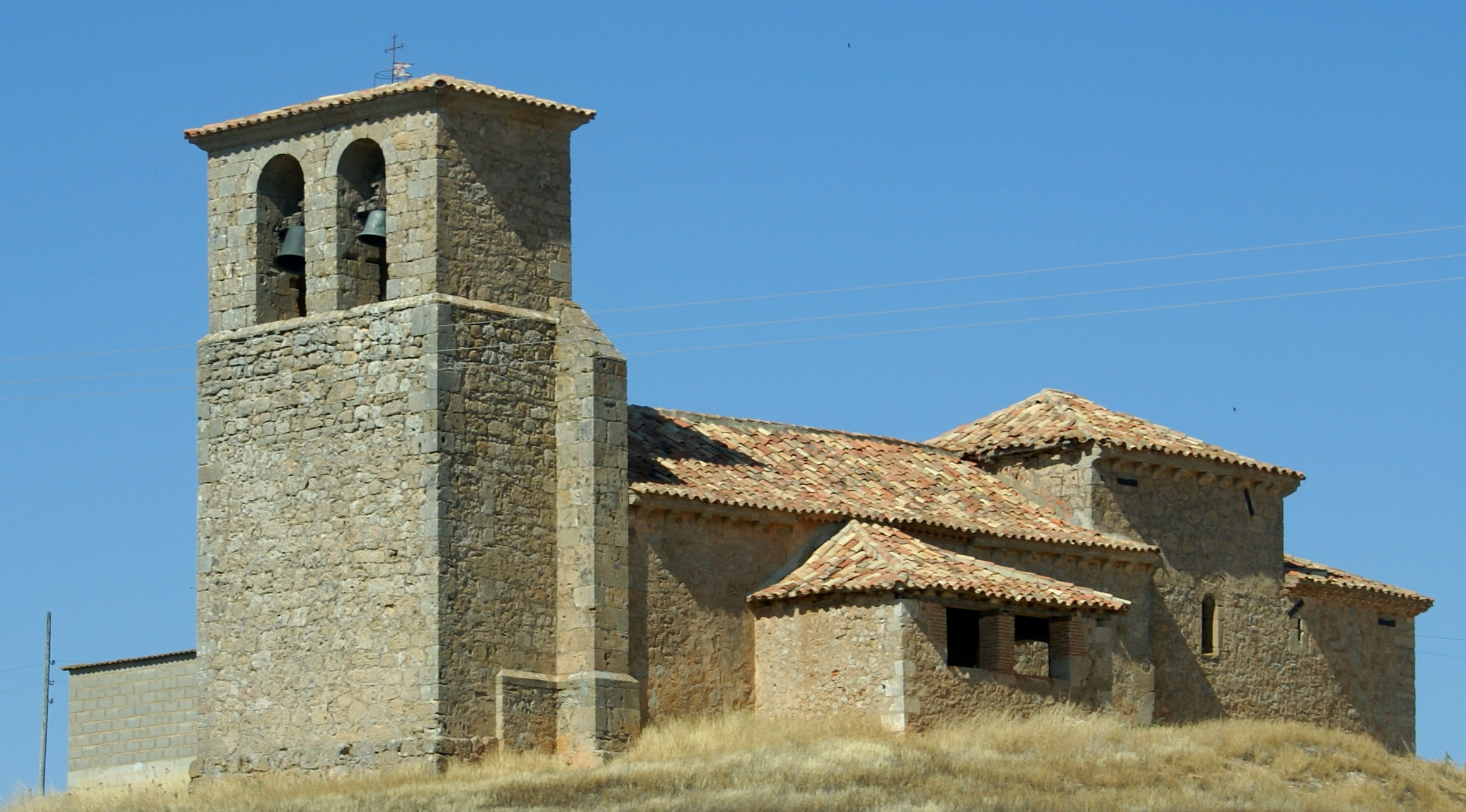
San Antón Church in Bordejé, Coscurita.

Coscurita is a municipality located in the province of Soria, Castile and León, Spain. According to the 2018 Municipal Register of Spain (INE), the municipality had a population of 79.
