= Momblona =

- Municipality
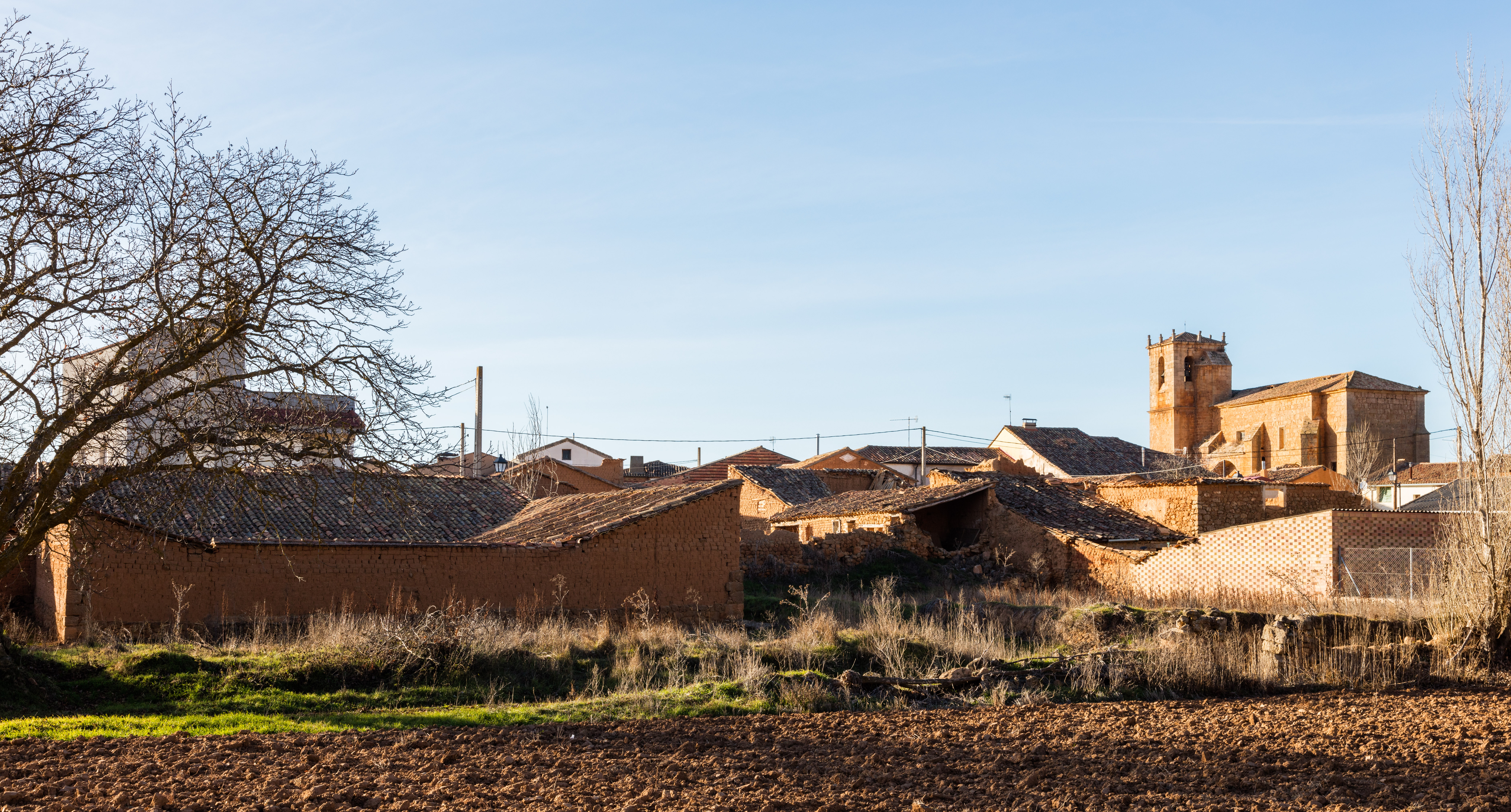

- Location in Spain. Momblona (Spain)
- Coordinates: 41°26′38″N 2°20′47″W
- Country: Spain
- Autonomous community: Castile and León
- Province: Soria
- Municipality: Momblona

Area
  - Total: 22.91 km^{2} (8.85 sq mi)
- Elevation: 1,062 m (3,484 ft)

Population (2025-01-01)
  - Total: 19
  - Density: 0.83/km^{2} (2.1/sq mi)
- Time zone: UTC+1 (CET)
  - Summer (DST): UTC+2 (CEST)

Momblona is a municipality located in the province of Soria, Castile and León, Spain. According to the 2004 census (INE), the municipality had a population of 37 inhabitants.
