= Matamala de Almazán =

- Municipality
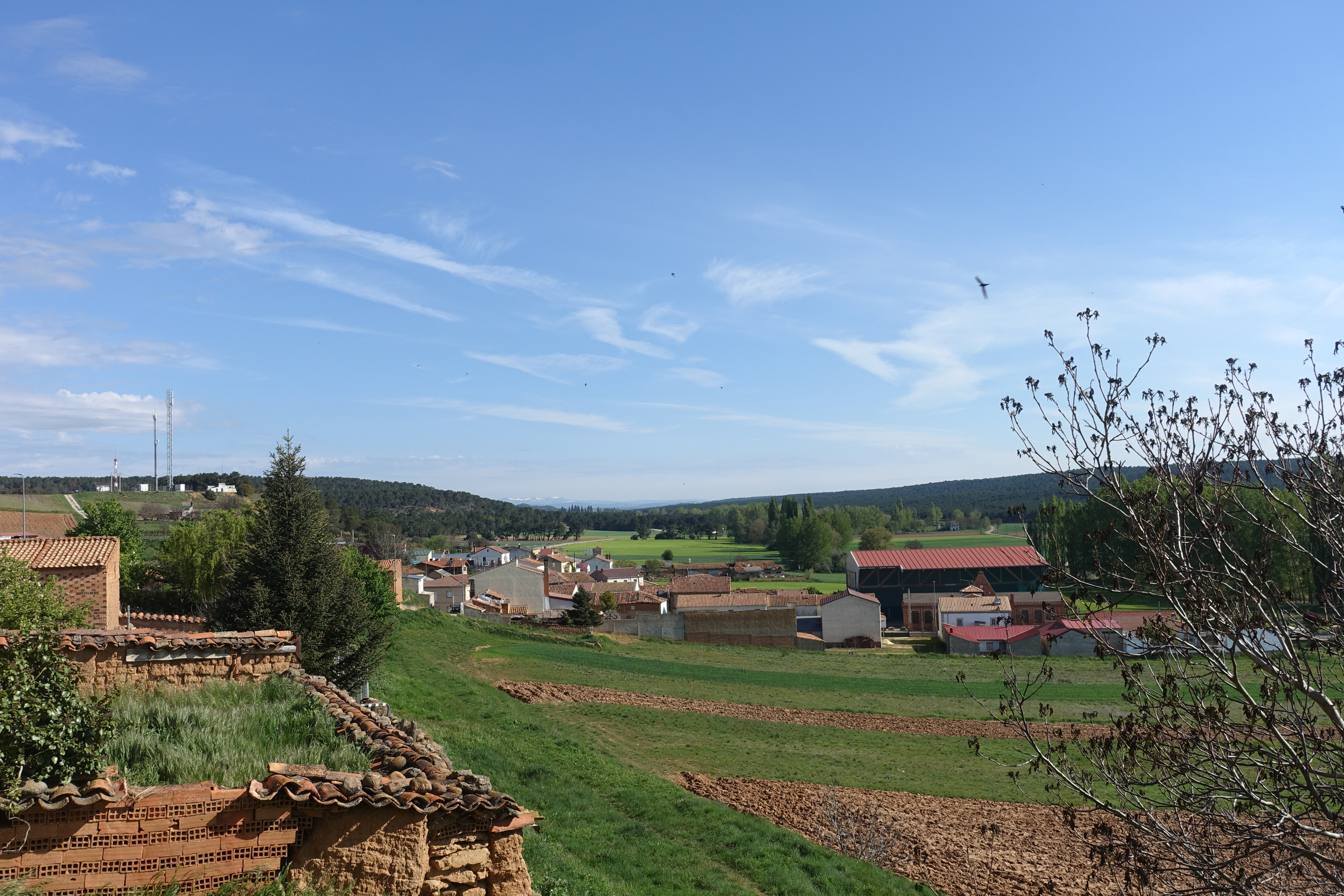
- Partial view of Matamala de Almazán, Soria, Spain

- Location in Spain. Matamala de Almazán (Spain)
- Coordinates: 41°30′23″N 2°38′24″W
- Country: Spain
- Autonomous community: Castile and León
- Province: Soria
- Municipality: Matamala de Almazán

Area
  - Total: 62 km^{2} (24 sq mi)
- Elevation: 945 m (3,100 ft)

Population (2025-01-01)
  - Total: 251
  - Density: 4.0/km^{2} (10/sq mi)
- Time zone: UTC+1 (CET)
  - Summer (DST): UTC+2 (CEST)
- Website: Official website

Matamala de Almazán is a municipality located in the province of Soria, Castile and León, Spain. According to the 2025 census (INE), the municipality has a population of 251 inhabitants. It includes the population centers of Matamala de Almazán, Matute de Almazán, and Santa María del Prado.

== Demography ==
According to the 2004 census (INE), the municipality has a population of 378 inhabitants.

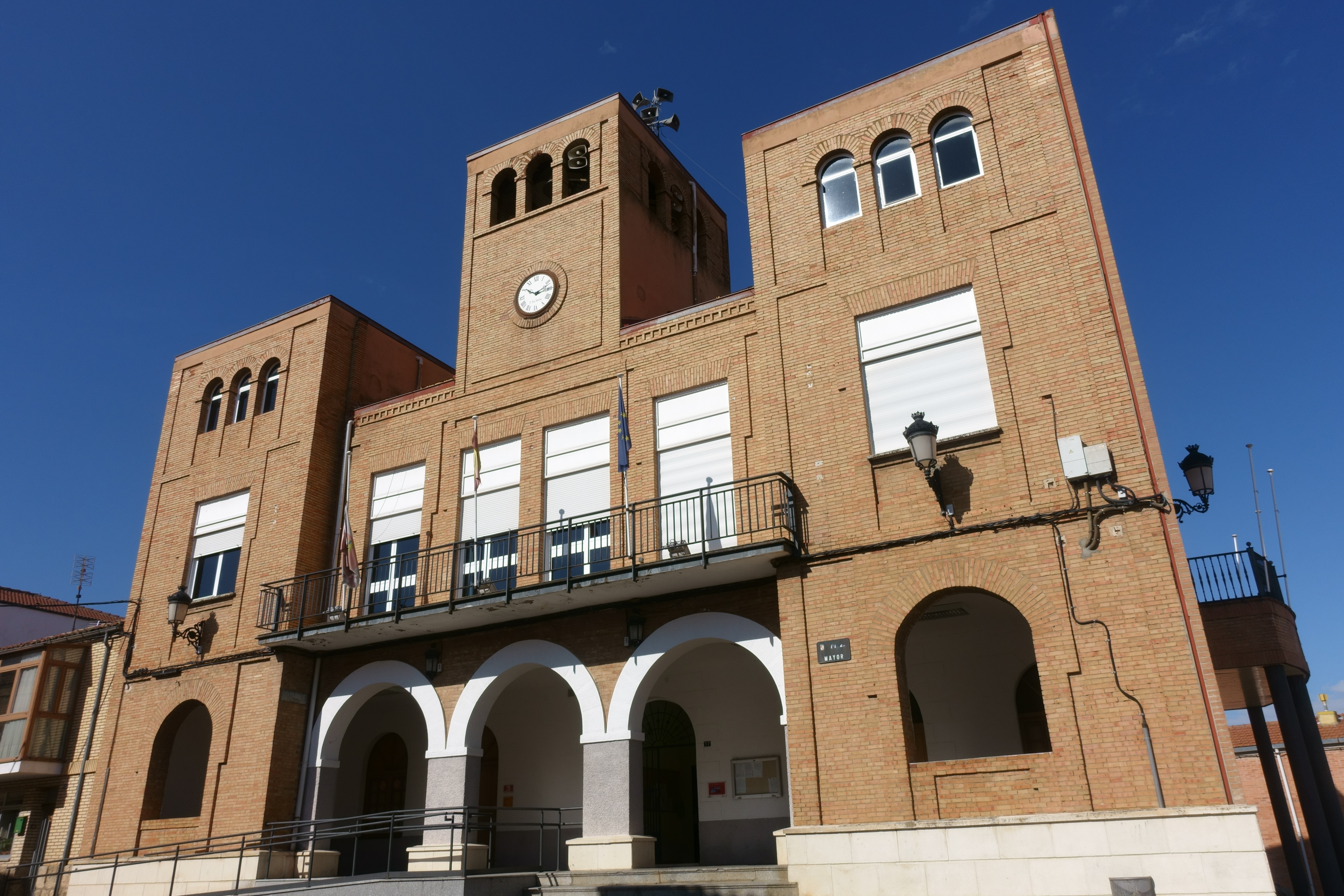
Matamala de Almazán Town Council

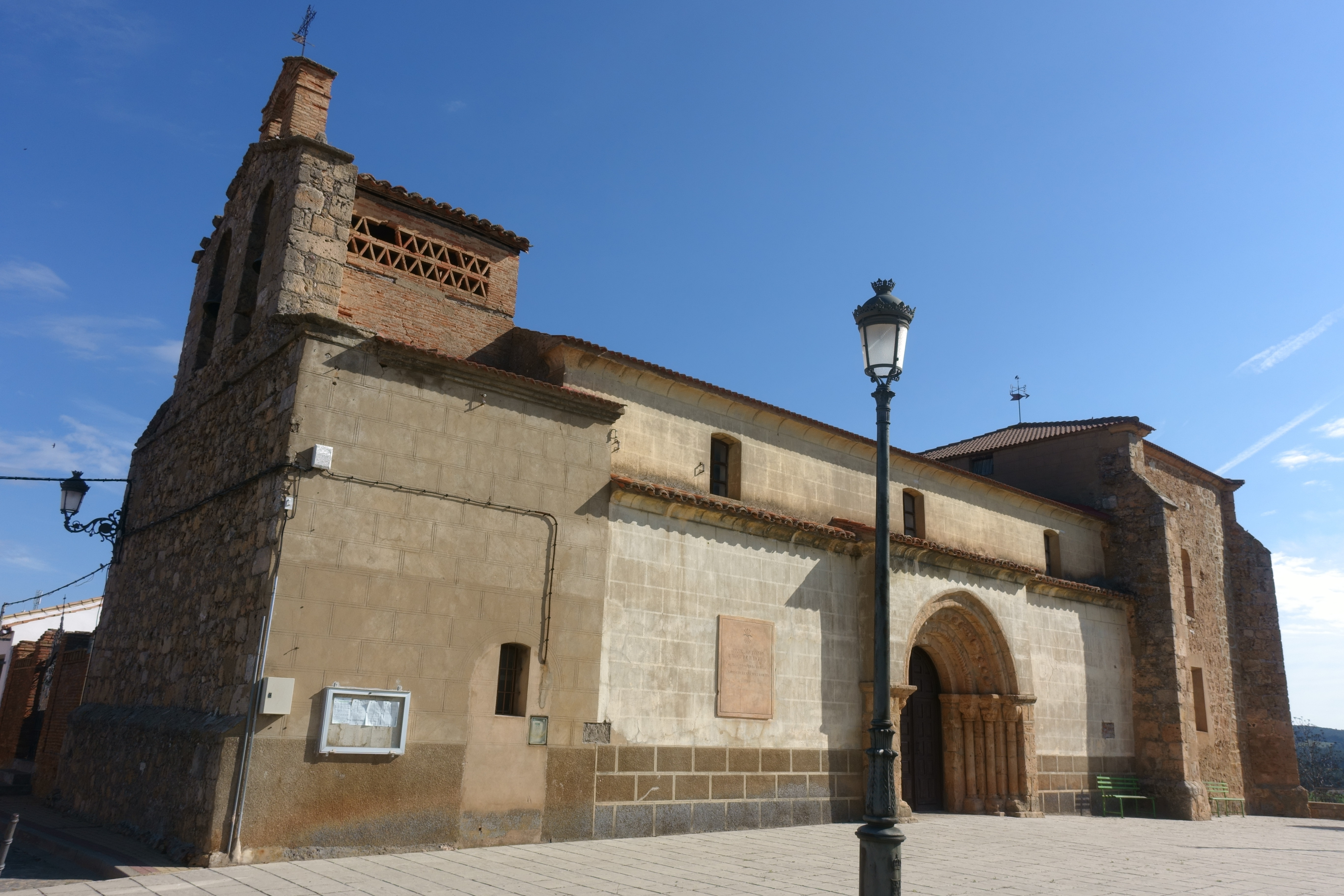
Church of the Inmaculada Concepción

According to the 2025 census (INE), the municipality has a population of 251 inhabitants.
