= Frechilla de Almazán =

- Municipality
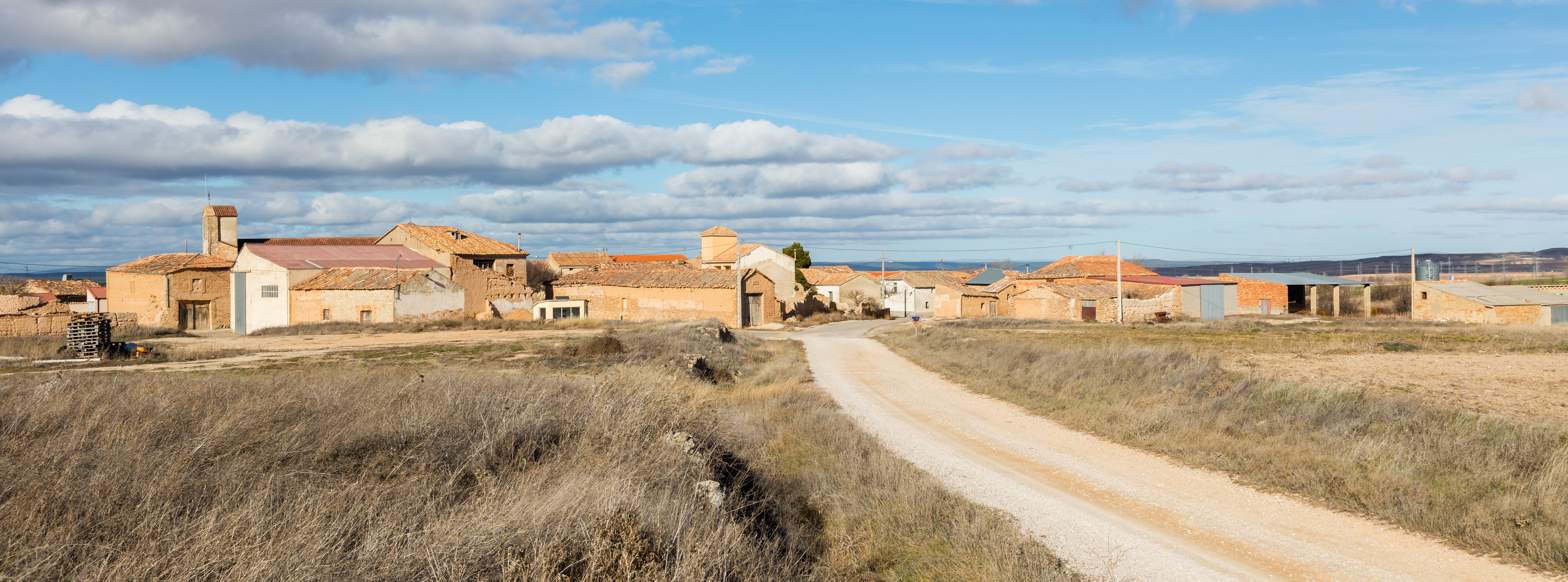

- Location in Spain. Frechilla de Almazán (Spain)
- Coordinates: 41°25′33″N 2°30′55″W
- Country: Spain
- Autonomous community: Castile and León
- Province: Soria
- Municipality: Frechilla de Almazán

Area
  - Total: 25.68 km^{2} (9.92 sq mi)

Population (2025-01-01)
  - Total: 20
  - Density: 0.78/km^{2} (2.0/sq mi)
- Time zone: UTC+1 (CET)
  - Summer (DST): UTC+2 (CEST)

Frechilla de Almazán is a municipality located in the province of Soria, Castile and León, Spain. According to the 2004 census (INE), the municipality has a population of 37 inhabitants.
