= Nepas =

- Municipality
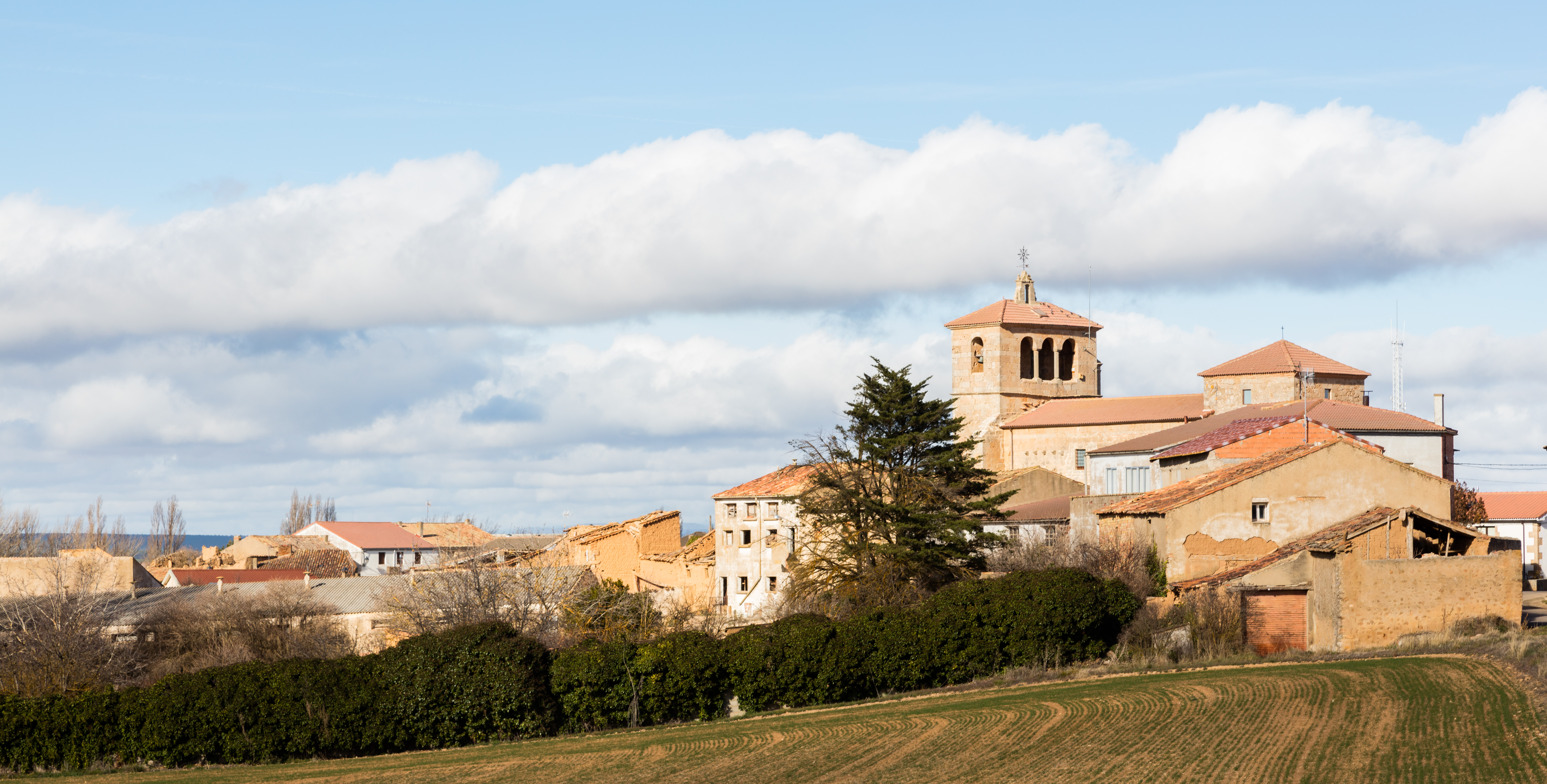

- Location in Spain. Nepas (Spain)
- Coordinates: 41°31′35″N 2°23′59″W
- Country: Spain
- Autonomous community: Castile and León
- Province: Soria
- Municipality: Nepas

Area
  - Total: 25 km^{2} (9.7 sq mi)

Population (2025-01-01)
  - Total: 49
  - Density: 2.0/km^{2} (5.1/sq mi)
- Time zone: UTC+1 (CET)
  - Summer (DST): UTC+2 (CEST)

Nepas is a municipality located in the province of Soria, Castile and León, Spain. According to the 2004 census (INE), the municipality has a population of 81 inhabitants.
