= Soliedra =

- Municipality
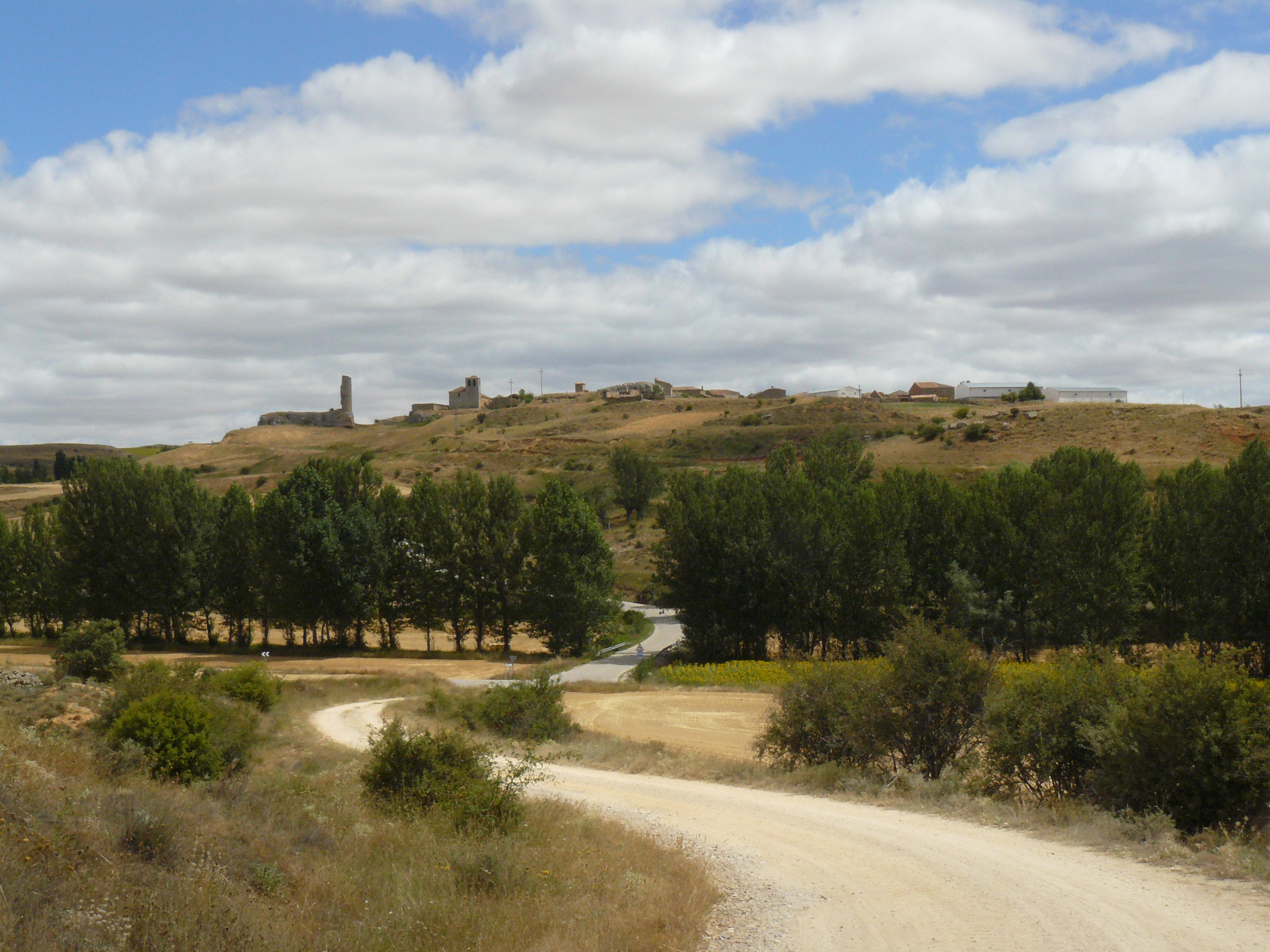

- Location in Spain. Soliedra (Spain)
- Coordinates: 41°28′11″N 2°22′55″W
- Country: Spain
- Autonomous community: Castile and León
- Province: Soria
- Municipality: Soliedra

Area
  - Total: 19 km^{2} (7.3 sq mi)

Population (2025-01-01)
  - Total: 37
  - Density: 1.9/km^{2} (5.0/sq mi)
- Time zone: UTC+1 (CET)
  - Summer (DST): UTC+2 (CEST)

Soliedra is a municipality located in the province of Soria, Castile and León, Spain. According to the 2004 census (INE), the municipality has a population of 37 inhabitants.
