= Barcones =

- Municipality
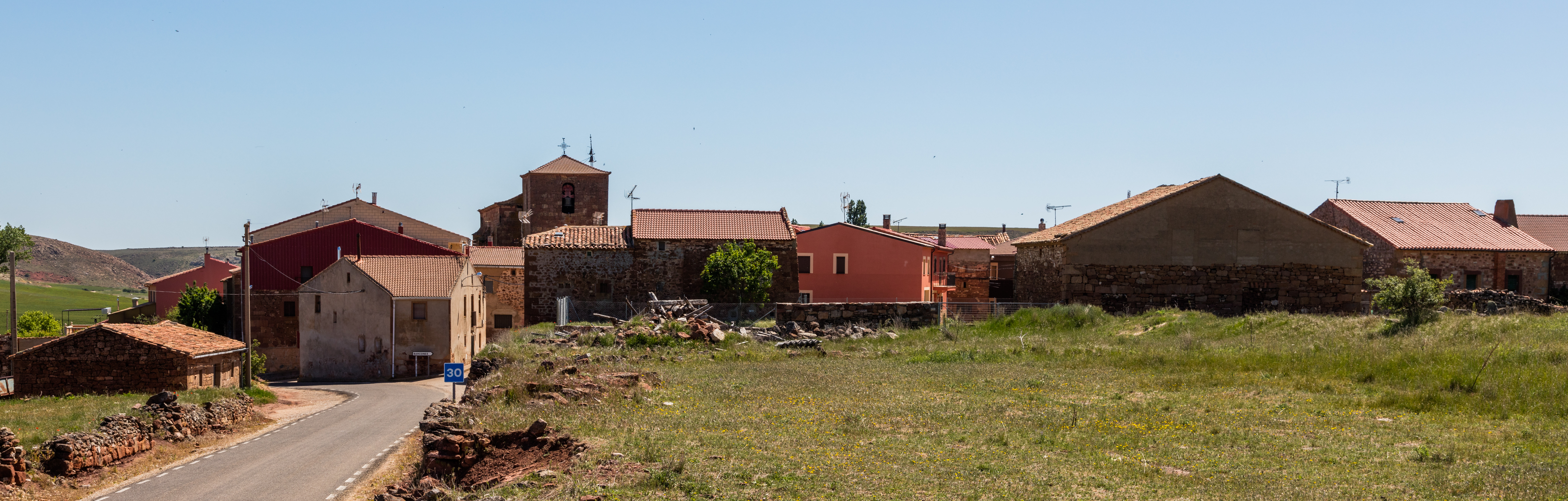

- Location in Spain. Barcones (Spain)
- Country: Spain
- Autonomous community: Castile and León
- Province: Soria
- Municipality: Barcones

Area
  - Total: 55 km^{2} (21 sq mi)

Population (2025-01-01)
  - Total: 25
  - Density: 0.45/km^{2} (1.2/sq mi)
- Time zone: UTC+1 (CET)
  - Summer (DST): UTC+2 (CEST)
- Website: Official website

Barcones is a municipality located in the province of Soria, Castile and León, Spain. According to the 2004 census (INE), the municipality had a population of 42.

== History ==
That it was an ancient population center is attested by the numerous traces of human settlement dating from prehistory. Along the Atienza road, before crossing the river, there are cisterns, foundations and excavations in the reddish sandstone which is typical of this part of Castile and is relatively easily worked.

Between the town and the hermitage of Barconcitos, a section of an excavated road can be seen cut into the sandstone. It is said that in some houses there can also be found cellars and caves as well as passages that nobody knows yet where they lead.

Following the Reconquista, Barcones belonged to the extensive Alfoz (municipality) of Atienza and later to the Senorio de Paredes. At the fall of the Antiguo Régimen the town was constituted as a municipality in the region of Castilla la Vieja which, in the 1842 census, had 171 homes and 524 residents.
