= Viana de Duero =

- Municipality
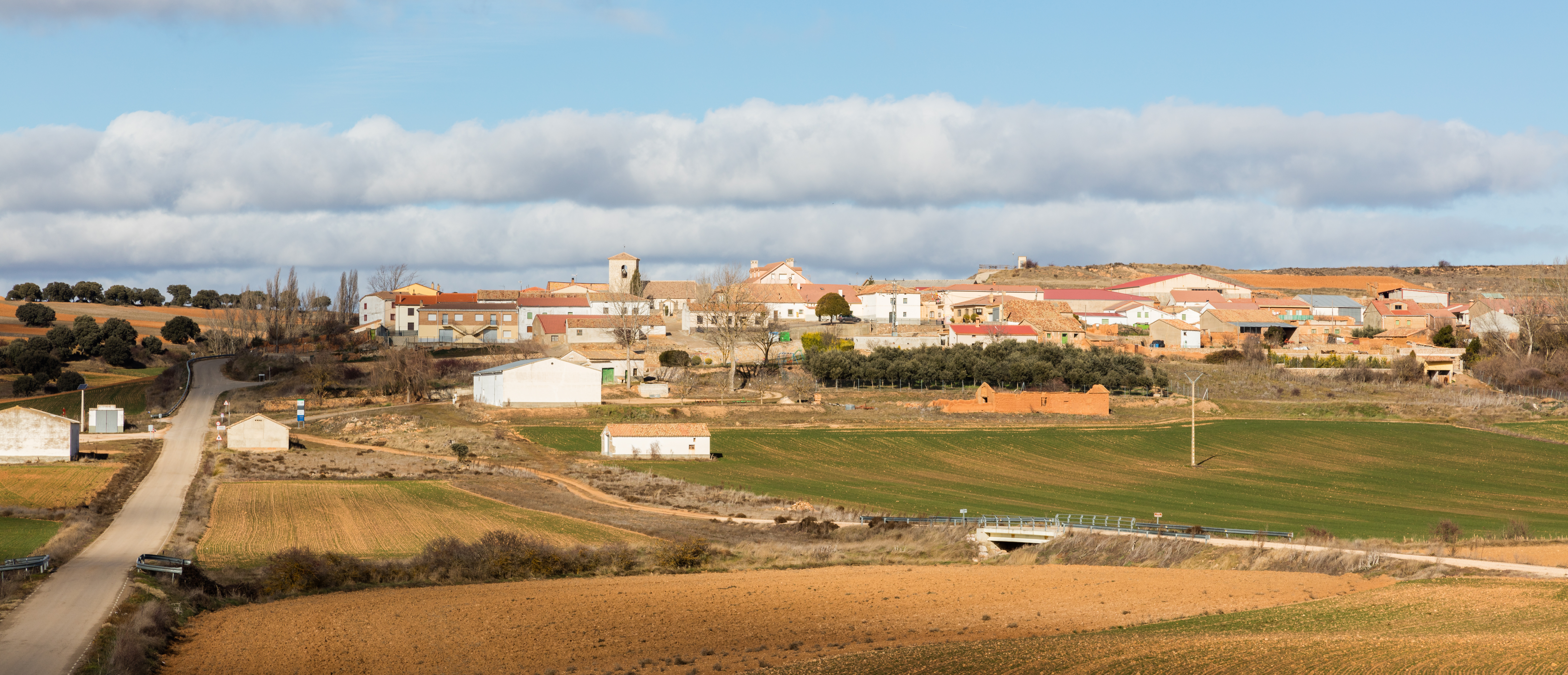

- Location in Spain. Viana de Duero (Spain)
- Coordinates: 41°32′01″N 2°27′38″W
- Country: Spain
- Autonomous community: Castile and León
- Province: Soria
- Municipality: Viana de Duero

Area
  - Total: 56.16 km^{2} (21.68 sq mi)
- Elevation: 992 m (3,255 ft)

Population (2025-01-01)
  - Total: 47
  - Density: 0.84/km^{2} (2.2/sq mi)
- Time zone: UTC+1 (CET)
  - Summer (DST): UTC+2 (CEST)

Viana de Duero is a municipality located in the province of Soria, Castile and León, Spain. According to the 2004 census (INE), the municipality has a population of 73 inhabitants.
