= Borjabad =

- Municipality
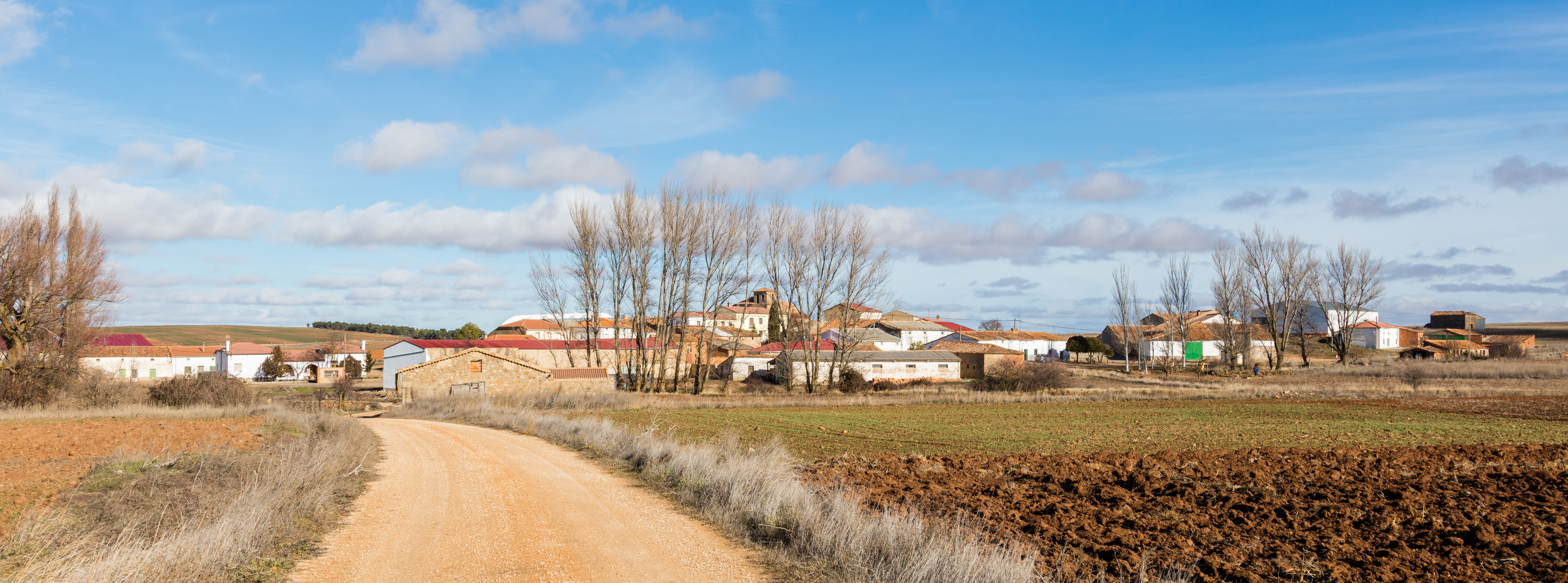
- Entrance to Borjabad

- Location in Spain. Borjabad (Spain)
- Country: Spain
- Autonomous community: Castile and León
- Province: Soria
- Municipality: Borjabad

Area
  - Total: 23.40 km^{2} (9.03 sq mi)
- Elevation: 1,013 m (3,323 ft)

Population (2025-01-01)
  - Total: 29
  - Density: 1.2/km^{2} (3.2/sq mi)
- Time zone: UTC+1 (CET)
  - Summer (DST): UTC+2 (CEST)

Borjabad is a municipality located in the province of Soria, Castile and León, Spain. According to the 2004 census (INE), the municipality had a population of 56 inhabitants.
