= Almazán =

- Municipality
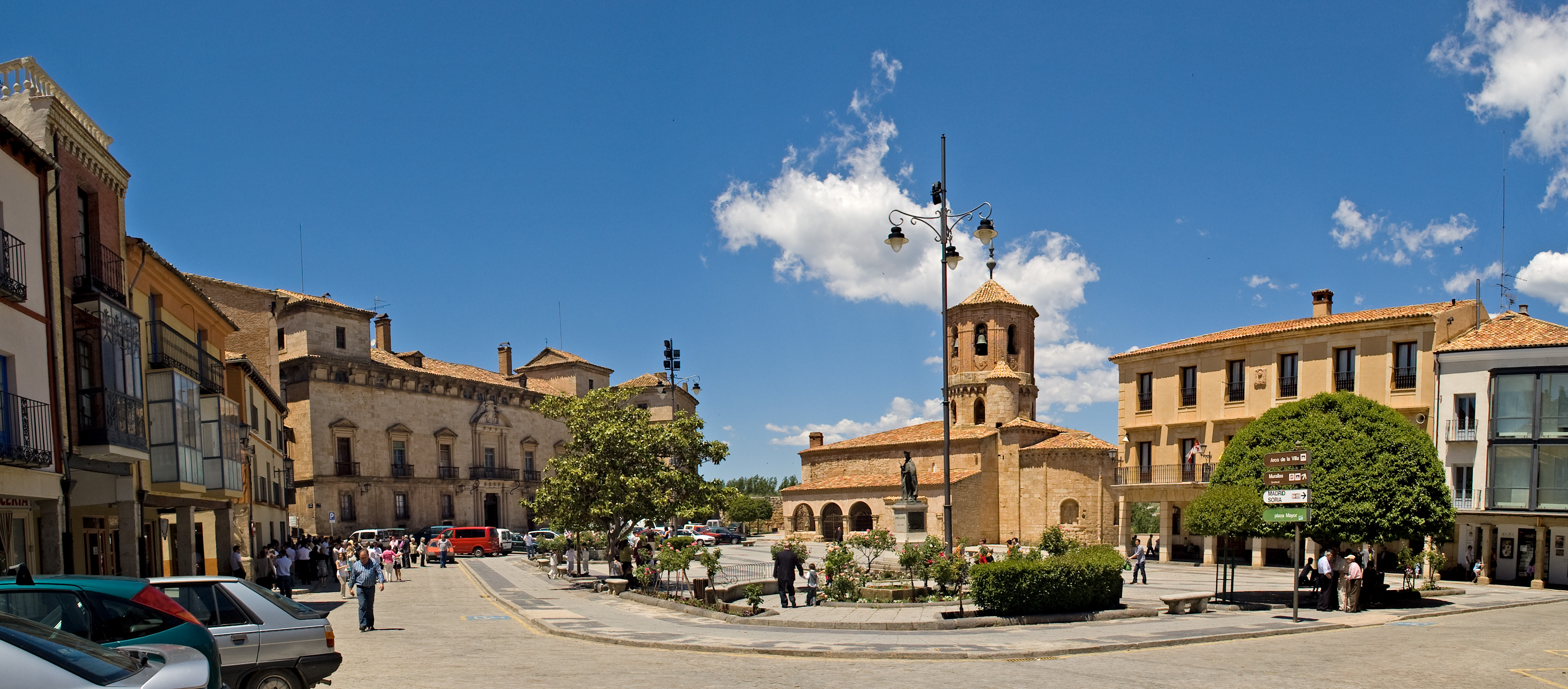

- Flag Coat of arms

- Municipal location in the Province of Soria

- Location in Spain Almazán (Spain)
- Coordinates: 41°21′09″N 2°31′59″W
- Country: Spain
- Community: Castile and León
- Province: Soria

Government
  - Mayor: José Antonio de Miguel Nieto (PPSO)

Area
  - Total: 166.53 km^{2} (64.30 sq mi)
- Elevation: 960 m (3,150 ft)

Population (2025-01-01)
  - Total: 5,544
  - Density: 33.29/km^{2} (86.22/sq mi)
- Time zone: UTC+1 (CET)
  - Summer (DST): UTC+2 (CEST)
- Postal code: 42200
- Website: http://www.almazan.es

Almazán (Spanish pronunciation: [almaˈθan]) is a municipality located in the province of Soria, Castile and León, Spain. As of 2013, the municipality has a population of 5,843 inhabitants. It is also the seat of the judicial district of Almazán, and ecclesiastically it belongs to the Diocese of Osma, a suffragan diocese of the Archdiocese of Burgos. Connected via the Autovía A-15 and Carretera nacional N-111, it is situated 194 kilometres (121 mi) by road northeast of Madrid. The town lies on the east bank of the Duero river.

== History ==
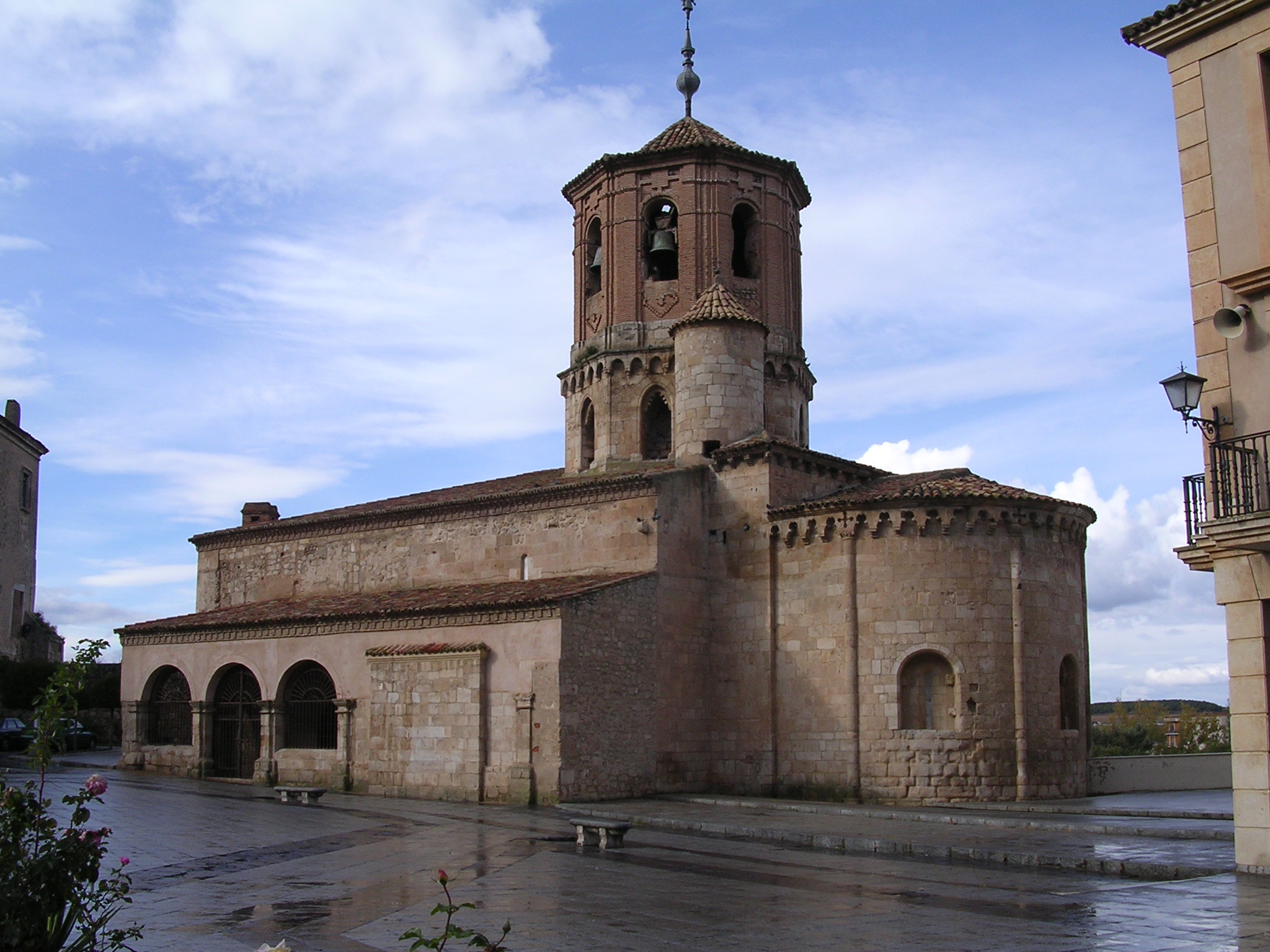
Church of San Miguel, built in the 12th century

In the early 10th century, fortifications were built along the Duero at Soria and Almazán. In 1068, Almazán was conquered by the Christians of Alfonso VI of León, but soon after was recovered for al-Ándalus. In 1128, it was repopulated by Alfonso I, although after his death in 1134, the town fell into Castilian hands and was granted by Alfonso VII of León to the bishops of Sigüenza. In 1158, Sancho III of Castile created the Almazán la Orden de Caballería de Calatrava. The Church of San Miguel was built in the 12th century. In the late 13th century, civil war broke out, involving Sancho IV of Castile, who claimed the throne of Castile, and Alfonso de la Cerda, a liberal. In 1305, after various conflicts, Almazán was returned to the Castilian crown, and then in 1375, a peace agreement was signed between Pedro IV of Aragon, King of Aragon, and Henry II, king of Castile.

Almazán was divided into two townships, and the town became ruled by the Mayor, assisted by six aldermen, three class gentlemen and three good men of the town. It was visited by important figures in the Catholic Church several times over the years. On March 12, 1648, the playwright Tirso de Molina died in the convent of the Merced and presumably lies in the convent cemetery.

During the Spanish War of Independence, on July 10, 1810, the town was taken by French General Régis Barthélemy Mouton-Duvernet, but with the fall of the ancien regime, it became a constitutional municipality of the region of Castilla la Vieja. The 1842 census recorded 484 households and 2400 residents in Almazán. In the 1850s, mid-nineteenth century, the population grew significantly after Fuentelcarro and Tejerizas were merged into the municipality. In the 1981 census, the population again grew markedly after the incorporation of Cobertelada into the municipality, with the localities of Almántiga, Balluncar, Covarrubias and Lodares del Monte.

== Notable people ==
Lexicographer María Moliner grew up in the town, after moving from her birthplace, the Aragonese town of Paniza.
