= Nolay, Soria =

Nolay
- Municipality
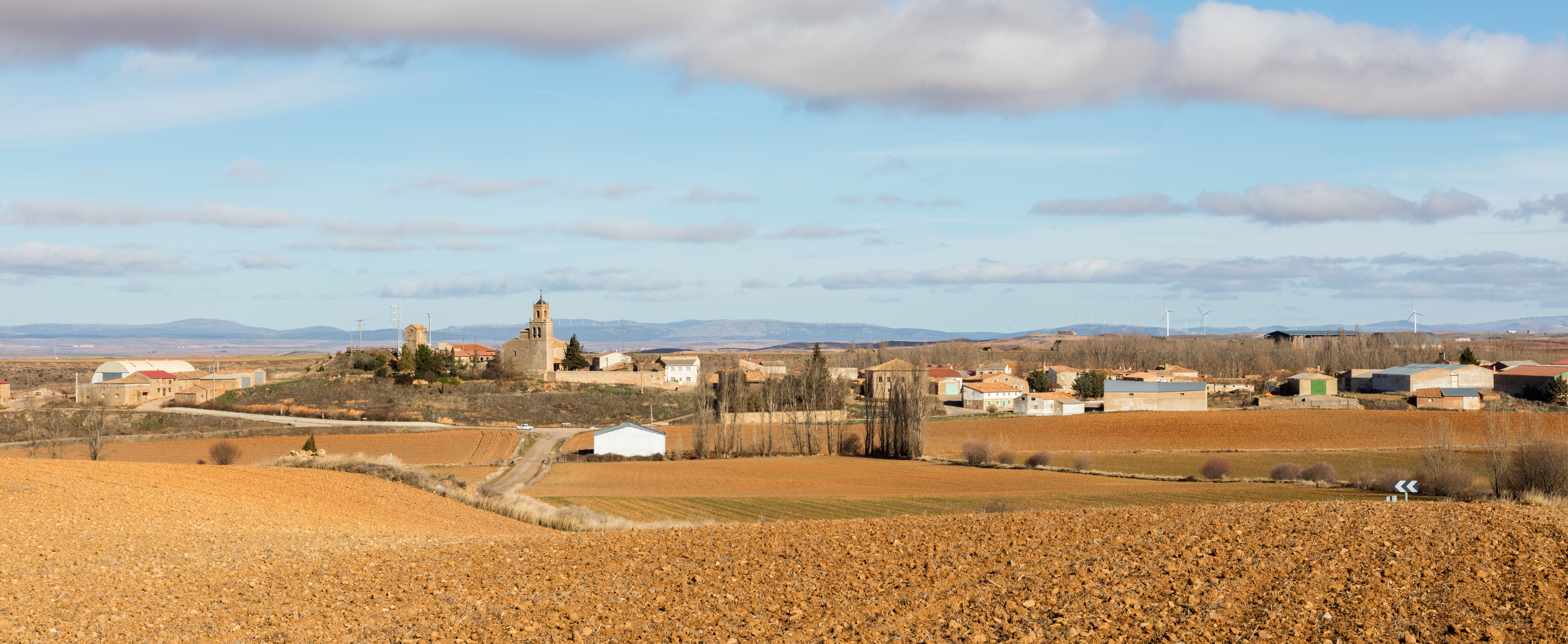
- View of Nolay

- Location in Spain. Nolay (Spain)
- Coordinates: 41°31′37″N 2°21′05″W
- Country: Spain
- Autonomous community: Castile and León
- Province: Soria
- Municipality: Nolay

Area
  - Total: 21.94 km^{2} (8.47 sq mi)
- Elevation: 1,072 m (3,517 ft)

Population (2025-01-01)
  - Total: 45
  - Density: 2.1/km^{2} (5.3/sq mi)
- Time zone: UTC+1 (CET)
  - Summer (DST): UTC+2 (CEST)
- Website: Official website

Nolay is a municipality located in the province of Soria, in the autonomous community of Castile and León, Spain.
