= Taroda =

- Municipality
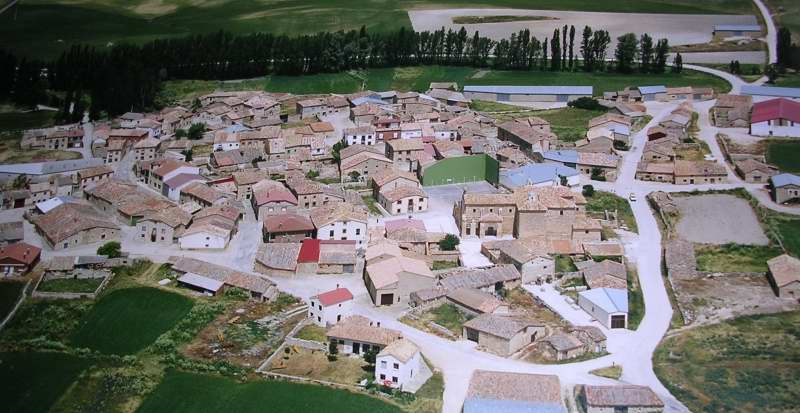
- Aerial view of Taroda

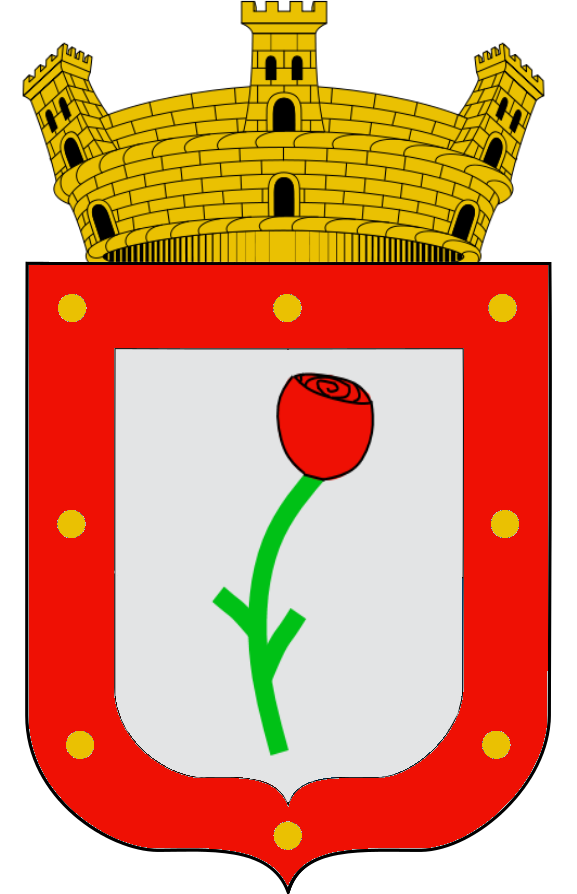
- Coat of arms

- Location in Spain. Taroda (Spain)
- Coordinates: 41°20′54″N 2°26′01″W
- Country: Spain
- Autonomous community: Castile and León
- Province: Soria
- Municipality: Taroda

Area
  - Total: 36 km^{2} (14 sq mi)

Population (2025-01-01)
  - Total: 45
  - Density: 1.3/km^{2} (3.2/sq mi)
- Time zone: UTC+1 (CET)
  - Summer (DST): UTC+2 (CEST)
- Website: Official website

Taroda is a municipality located in the province of Soria, Castile and León, Spain. According to the 2004 census (INE), the municipality has a population of 76 inhabitants.
