= Escobosa de Almazán =

- Municipality
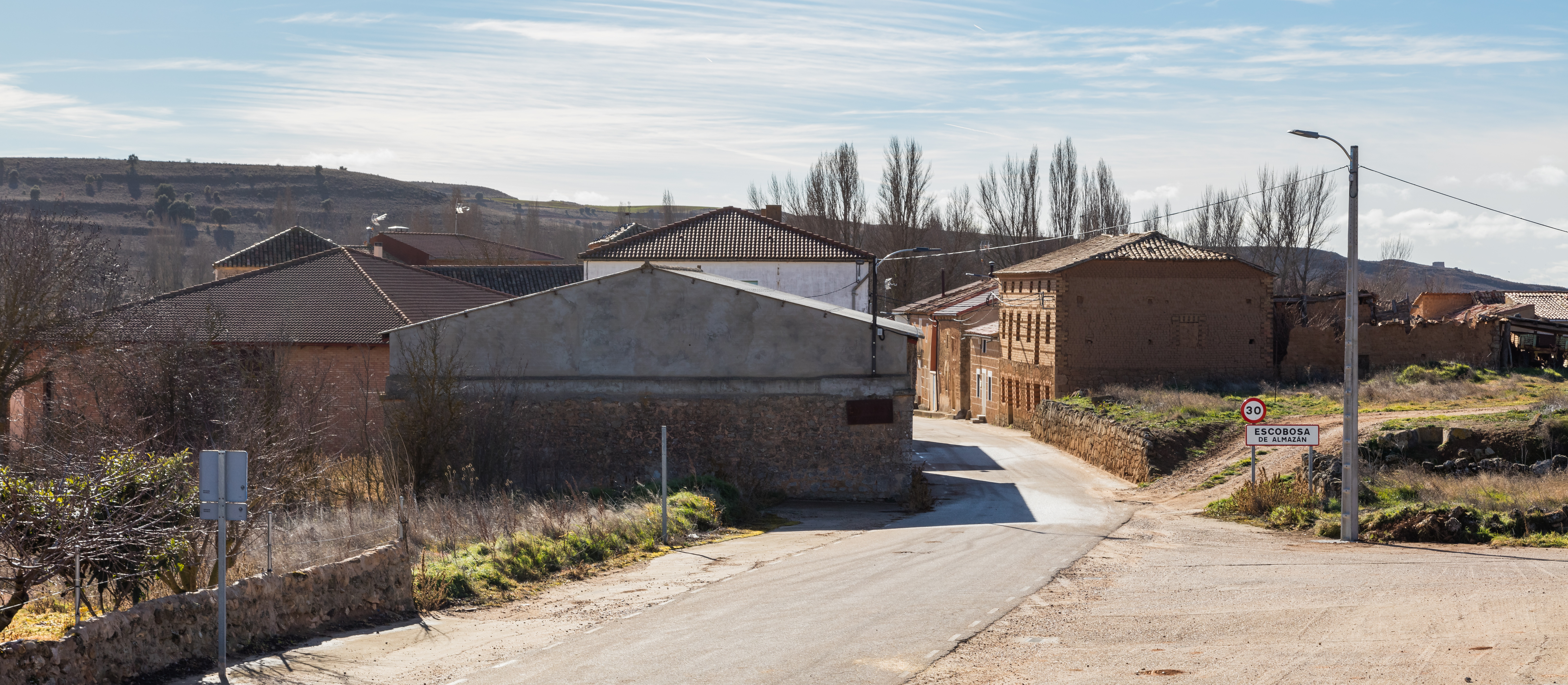
- Entrance to Escobosa de Almazán

- Location in Spain. Escobosa de Almazán (Spain)
- Coordinates: 41°29′07″N 2°22′18″W
- Country: Spain
- Autonomous community: Castile and León
- Province: Soria
- Municipality: Escobosa de Almazán

Area
  - Total: 19.44 km^{2} (7.51 sq mi)
- Elevation: 1,079 m (3,540 ft)

Population (2025-01-01)
  - Total: 19
  - Density: 0.98/km^{2} (2.5/sq mi)
- Time zone: UTC+1 (CET)
  - Summer (DST): UTC+2 (CEST)

Escobosa de Almazán is a municipality located in the province of Soria, Castile and León, Spain.

== Population ==
1981-68

1991-52

2001-39

2011-29

2021-20

2023-19
