= Centenera de Andaluz =

- Municipality
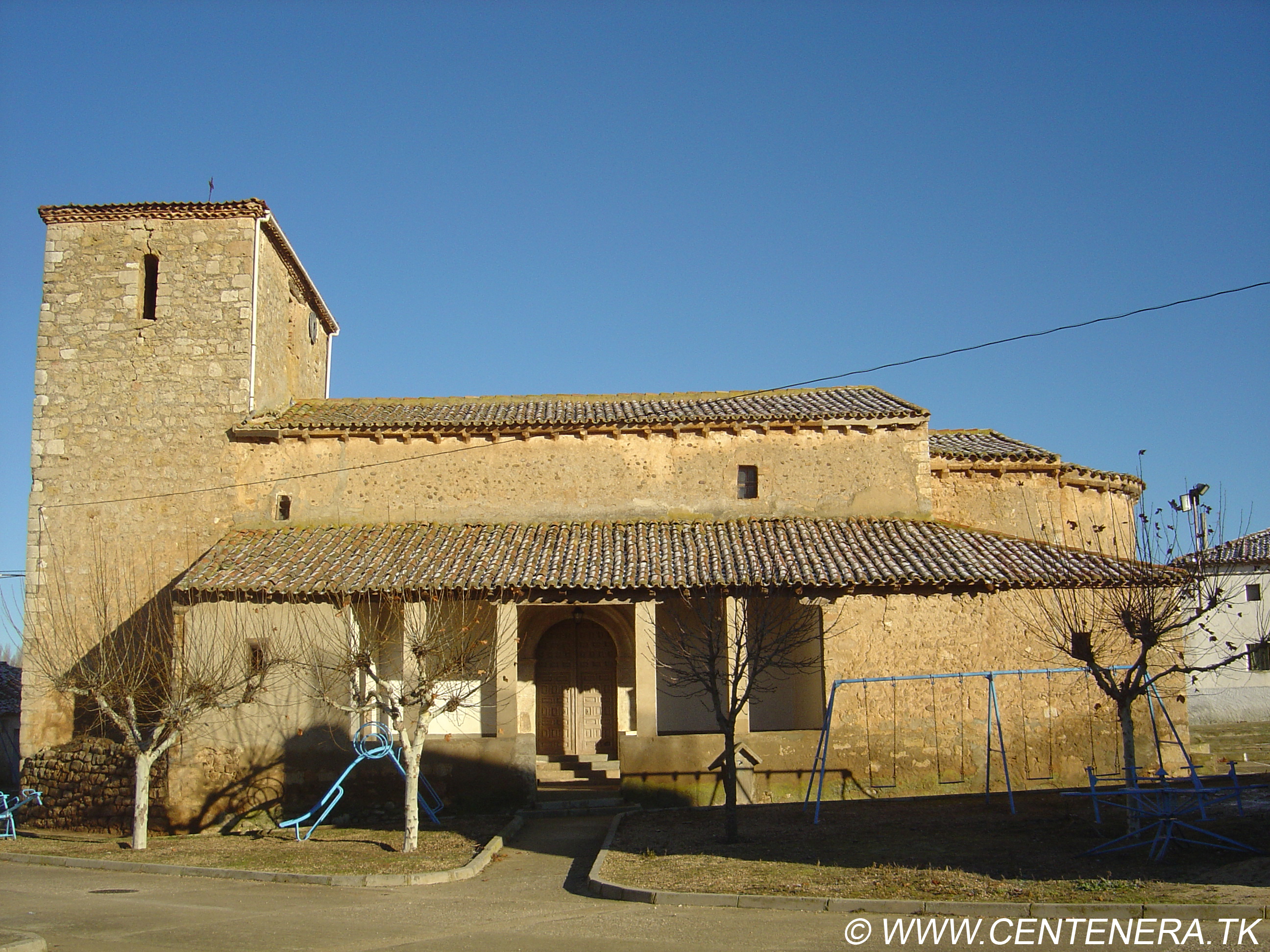
- San Lorenzo Church, built between the 12th and 13th centuries.

- Location in Spain. Centenera de Andaluz (Spain)
- Country: Spain
- Autonomous community: Castile and León
- Province: Soria
- Municipality: Centenera de Andaluz

Area
  - Total: 19.87 km^{2} (7.67 sq mi)
- Elevation: 944 m (3,097 ft)

Population (2025-01-01)
  - Total: 19
  - Density: 0.96/km^{2} (2.5/sq mi)
- Time zone: UTC+1 (CET)
  - Summer (DST): UTC+2 (CEST)
- Website: Official website

Centenera de Andaluz is a municipality located in the province of Soria, Castile and León, Spain. According to the 2004 census (INE), the municipality has a population of 25 inhabitants.
