= Province of Soria =

Province of Spain

Province of Soria Provincia de Soria
- Province
- Flag Coat of arms

- Map of the province of Soria in Spain
- Coordinates: 41°40′N 02°40′W
- Country: Spain
- Autonomous community: Castile and León
- Capital: Soria
- Municipalities: 183 (list)

Government
  - Type: Diputación
  - Body: Provincial Deputation of Soria

Area
  - Total: 10,306.98 km^{2} (3,979.55 sq mi)
  - Rank: 24th in Spain
- Highest elevation (Moncayo): 2,315 m (7,595 ft)

Population (2025)
  - Total: 90,183
  - Rank: 50th in Spain
  - Density: 8.7497/km^{2} (22.662/sq mi)
- Demonym: Soriano/a
- Website: dipsoria.es

The Province of Soria (Spanish: Provincia de Soria) is a province of north-central Spain, in the autonomous community of Castile-Leon, whose capital is Soria. It is the least populous province of Spain and among the least densely populated territories in the European Union, with a population of 90,183 in an area of 10,306.98 square kilometres (3,979.55 sq mi).

The province was formed in 1833 from part of the historic Old Castile region. Its terrain includes the Duero River plain around the provincial capital, the Moncayo and Urbión mountains to the north, and rolling hills to the south.

The economy comprises agriculture, manufacturing—including automotive components, wood processing and furniture manufacturing—and mining.

== History ==
Earlier a part of the historic Old Castile region, Soria province was constituted in 1833. It is bordered by the provinces of La Rioja, Zaragoza, Guadalajara, Segovia, and Burgos.

== Geography ==
Soria is both by the name of the provincia (province), and the name of its capital city, that province lying in north-central Spain, in the autonomous community of Castile-Leon. Soria, the capital, lies near province center, in a plain of the Duero River, to the south of which, the plain gives way to rolling hills, and to the north lie the Moncayo and Urbión mountains (these together constituting the province's varied terrain). Together, the province contitutes an area of 10,306 square kilometres (3,979 sq mi).

The summit of the Moncayo, coterminous with the province of Zaragoza, is the province's highest point at 2,315 metres above sea level.

== Coat of arms ==
The province's coat of arms bears the motto Soria pura, cabeza de estremadura [Soria the pure, head of the borderland], as Soria was centuries ago on the expanding borders between the northern Christian kingdoms and the territories then held by the Muslims.

== Administrative divisions ==
Map showing the comarcas of the Province of Soria

Soria has 183 municipalities divided in 10 comarcas:

- Comarca de Almazán
- Comarca de Berlanga
- Comarca de Burgo de Osma
- Comarca de Campo de Gómara
- Comarca de El Valle
- Comarca de Pinares
- Comarca de Soria
- Comarca de Tierras Altas
- Comarca del Moncayo
- Tierra de Medinaceli

== Demographics ==
Historical population
Year	Pop.	±%
1842	116,959	—
1857	147,468	+26.1%
1877	158,313	+7.4%
1887	156,959	−0.9%
1900	155,277	−1.1%
1910	162,011	+4.3%
1920	159,392	−1.6%
1930	162,681	+2.1%
1940	165,855	+2.0%
1950	164,575	−0.8%
1960	152,426	−7.4%
1970	117,462	−22.9%
1981	100,719	−14.3%
1991	94,537	−6.1%
2001	90,717	−4.0%
2011	94,610	+4.3%
2021	88,796	−6.1%
Source: INE

With a population of 91,652 in 2004 and 93,593 in 2007, it was judged, as of a 2005 governmental report, as being the least populous province of Spain, as well as "one of the most sparsely populated territories" in the European Union (with a density of less than 9 inhabitants/km^{2}).

As of 2025, the population is 90,183, of which 50.8% are male, and 49.2% are female. Minors make up 14.5% of the population, and seniors make up 26.0%.

=== Immigration ===
As of 2025, immigrants make up 17.8% of the population. The 5 largest foreign countries of birth are Morocco, Ecuador, Colombia, Venezuela and Bulgaria.

Foreign population by country of birth (2025)
Country	Population
Morocco	1,774
Ecuador	1,558
Colombia	1,518
Venezuela	1,435
Bulgaria	1,092
Romania	1,078
Peru	1,056
Argentina	859
Dominican Republic	857
Bolivia	651
Honduras	399
Cuba	336
Brazil	288
Ukraine	279
The Gambia	211

== Economy ==
As reported in 2001, there were a total of 70,000 hectares cultivated land in the 1950s, but excessive fragmentation and lack of mechanization resulted in very low productivity. In 1960, 70% of farms in the agricultural sector were used exclusively for animal rearing, and that sector as a whole accounted for 69% of workers in the province. As of this date, the province's most important agricultural products were cereals. As of 2013, there were about 100,000 hectares of land in the province dedicated to the cultivation of "soft wheat", and other 100,000 hectares for barley cultivation.

As well, indigenous forest resources were, as of this date, being exploited—for mushroom collecting, and for timber and resin; apart from these, the province also had important associated food industries.

As of 2005, the agricultural sector of Soria province contributed substantially to its GDP ("10 points higher than the national average" for Spain's provinces), while its industrial sector added, as of that year, just over 20% of its GDP. The province also had, as of that date, important auxiliary automotive component, wood processing, and furniture production industries.

With regard to mining, marble quarries are located in Espejón, while Sierra de Toranzo and Ólvega have iron mines, and magnetite sources are also being exploited in Borobia.

The capital city Soria is an important tourist destination.
