= Alcubilla de Avellaneda =

- Municipality
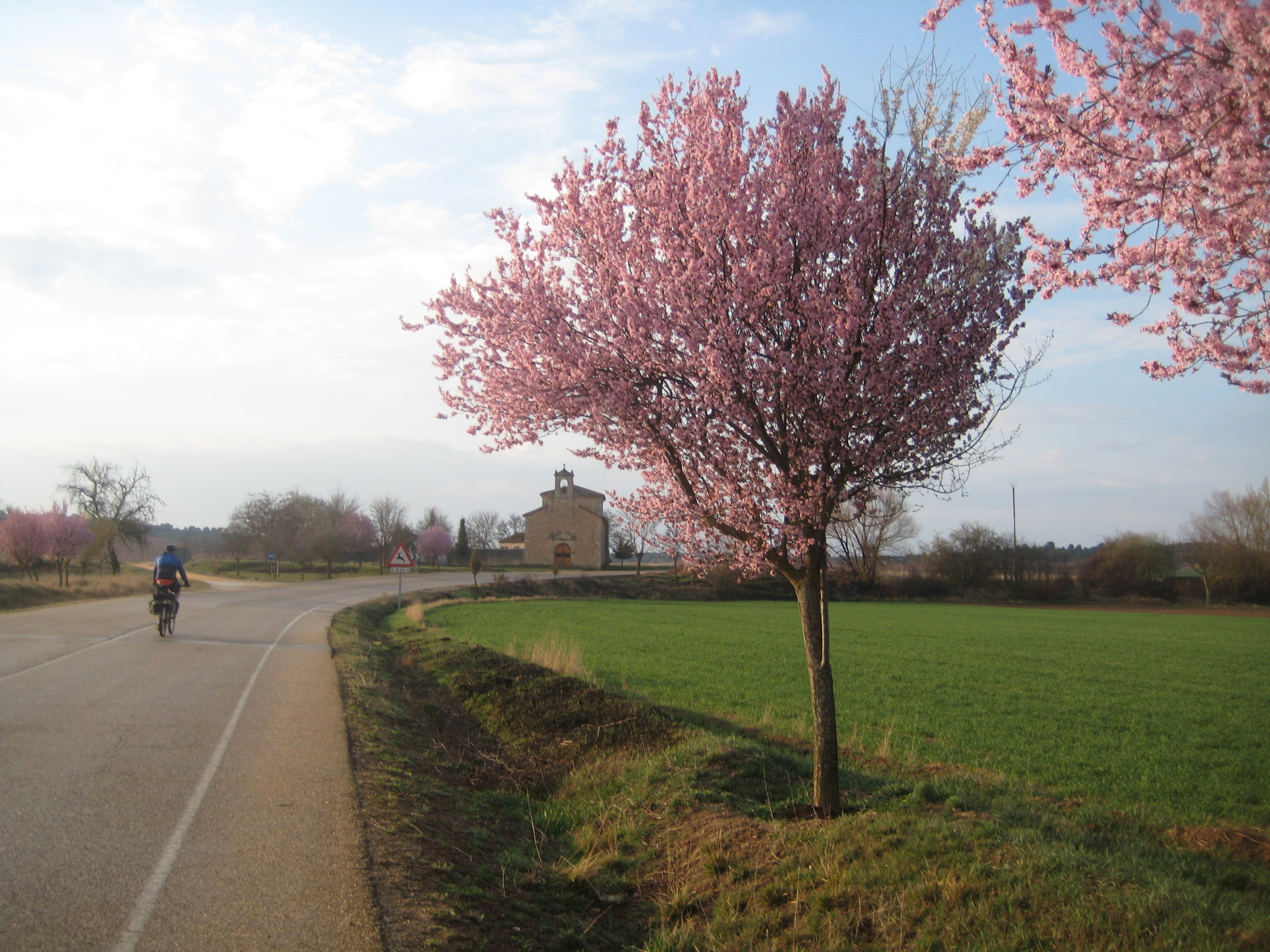

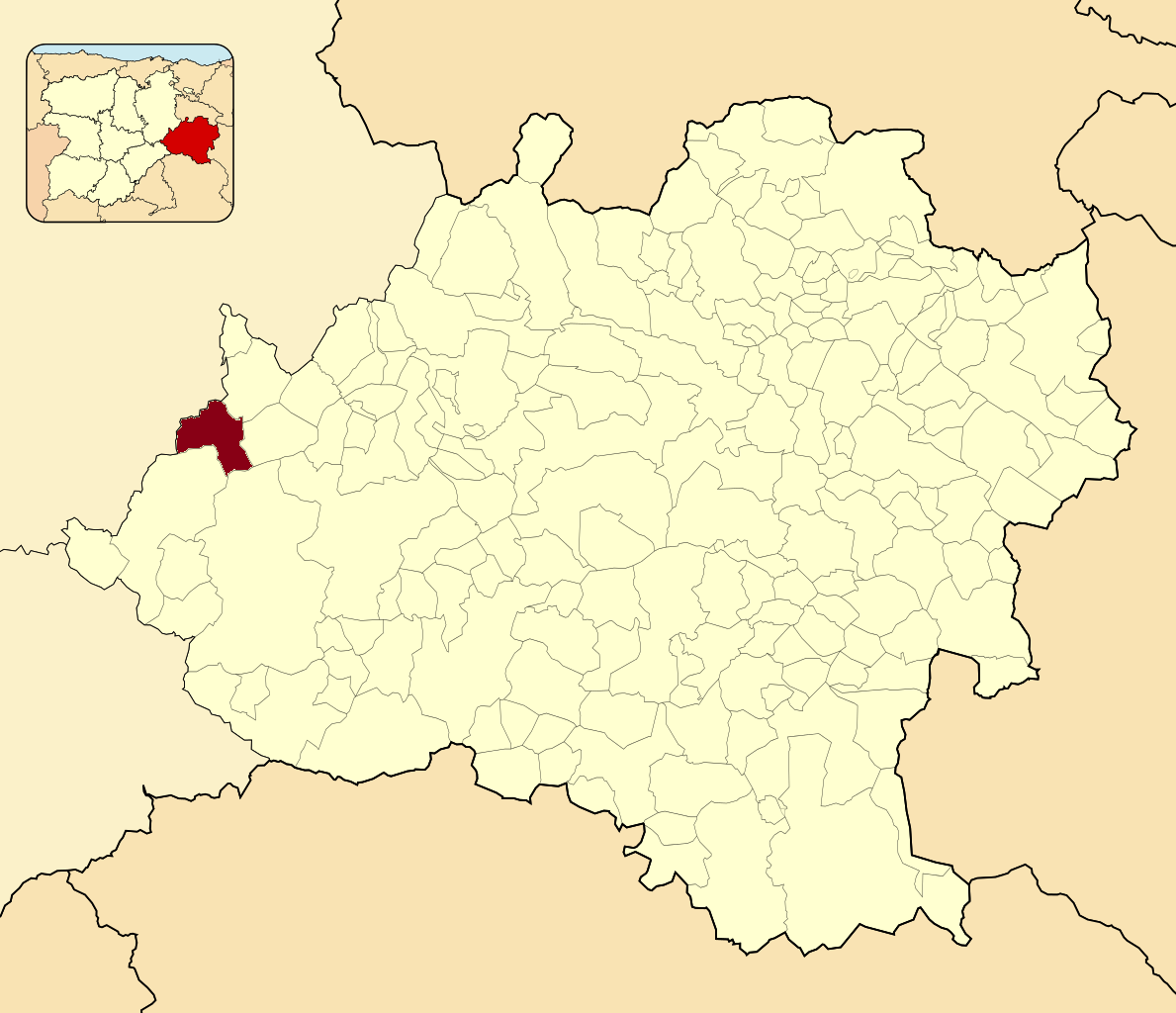
- Municipal location in the Province of Soria.

- Location in Spain Alcubilla de Avellaneda (Spain)
- Coordinates: 41°43′30″N 3°18′17″W
- Country: Spain
- Autonomous community: Castilla y León
- Province: Soria
- Comarca: Burgo de Osma

Government
  - Alcalde: Gustavo Adolfo Marín Puente (2019-2023) (PP)

Area
  - Total: 60.56 km^{2} (23.38 sq mi)
- Elevation: 926 m (3,038 ft)

Population (2025-01-01)
  - Total: 111
- Time zone: UTC+1 (CET)
  - Summer (DST): UTC+2 (CEST)
- Postal code: 42
- Website: alcubilladeavellaneda.es

Alcubilla de Avellaneda is a municipality located in the province of Soria, Castile and León, Spain. As of 2018 it had a population of 108 people. The village contains a Renaissance church and hermitage, the Ermita del Santo Cristo del Campillo.

== History ==
The area was inhabited in Roman times. Two swords of the Bronze Age have been unearthed at rural settlements in the vicinity at Alcoba la Yerma and La Serna. A Roman road that linked Uxama Argaela with the town of Clunia passes through the area. The Castilian nobleman and military leader El Cid (c. 1043 – 1099) is also documented to have passed through Alcubilla de Avellaneda.

== Geography ==
The municipality borders the Province of Burgos and contains the settlements of Alcubilla de Avellaneda, Alcoba de la Torre and Zayas de Bascones. Cañón del Río Lobos Natural Park lies to the northeast of the municipality, beyond Santa María de las Hoyas. The principal river is the Pilde.

== Notable landmarks ==
The Renaissance parish church of La Magdalena and the hermitage of Santo Cristo del Campillo are of note. The church originally had a Latin Cross plan. It contains books of the Baptism Acts since 1530 and Marriages and Deaths, since 1641. The hermitage, also of Renaissance origin was enlarged in 1775. In its walls are funeral steles dating from the 1st century BC. The dating of the ashlar links it the funeral art of the Roman city of Clunia Sulpicia. One is circular, representing the sun, and is dedicated to the god Manes. There is also the Renaissance Avellaneda Palace, which has a porticoed inner courtyard. It is undergoing restoration and is being converted into a tourist centre.

== Culture ==
The feast day of the municipality is September 14, which is dedicated to Santo Cristo del Campillo. A pilgrimage is held from the hermitage to the parish church carrying his image on the eve of the event, and a procession through the streets takes place on the day itself. The following day, Santo Cristo del Campillo is taken back to the hermitage. The festival of Santa María Magdalena takes place on July 22, and on February 2 is Candelas.
