= Hermitage of Santo Cristo de Miranda =

Hermitage in Spain

Coordinates: 41°45′51″N 3°08′17″W

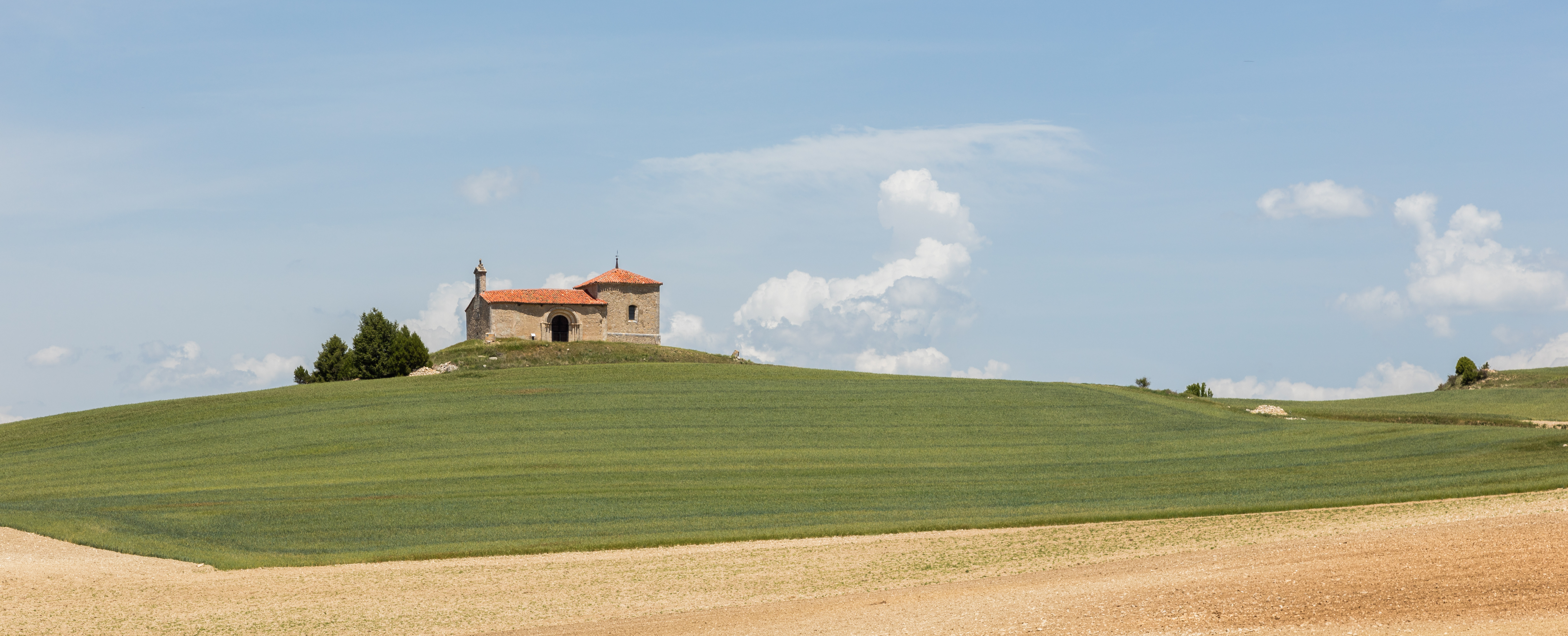
Ermita del Santo Cristo de Miranda.

The Hermitage of Santo Cristo de Miranda is a religious building in Santa María de las Hoyas (Province of Soria, Spain).

The hermitage was built in the 13th century, but only the door of the hermitage is original. The rest of the current structure dates to the 18th century. Inside the hermitage is a 14th-century polychrome carving titled El Santo Cristo de Miranda.
