= Castle of Ucero =

Castle in Spain

Coordinates: 41.719232°N 3.045661°W

Castillo de Ucero
- Ucero in Spain
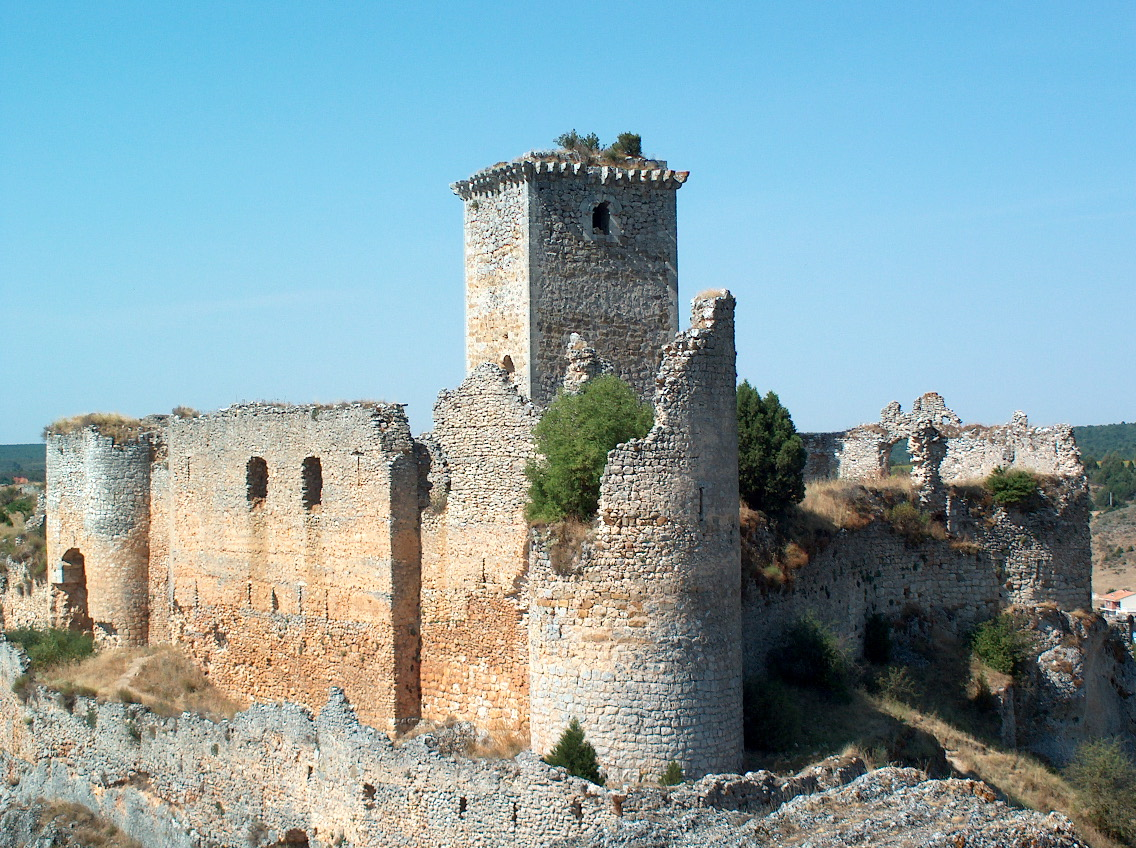

Site information
- Type: Castle

The Castle of Ucero is a medieval defensive construction located in Ucero, in the province of Soria (Castile and León, Spain).

The castle is the property of the Bishops of Osma.

== History ==
The place dominated by the castle has been inhabited since Prehistory. The castle is built on the site of an ancient Celtiberian castro.

The place is firstly mentioned in 1157 when Alfonso VII located the village of Sotos the Suso between Uxama and Ucero and there are database that indicate that the castle already existed in the 13th century. It is estimated that the important hermit of San Juan de Otero, nowadays destroyed, was ubicated near San Bartolomé, which was a Templarian chapel.
