= Ucero =

- Municipality
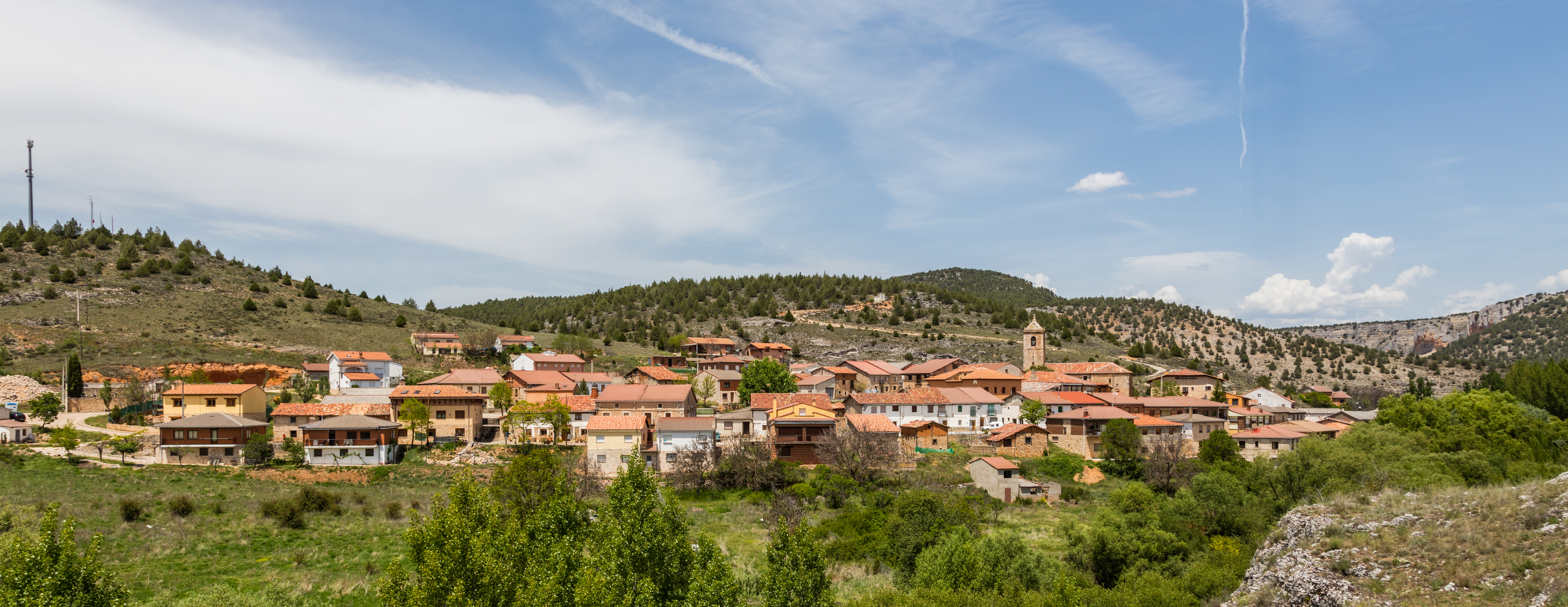

- Location in Spain. Ucero (Spain)
- Coordinates: 41°43′01″N 3°03′05″W
- Country: Spain
- Autonomous community: Castile and León
- Province: Soria
- Municipality: Ucero

Area
  - Total: 17.13 km^{2} (6.61 sq mi)
- Elevation: 964 m (3,163 ft)

Population (2025-01-01)
  - Total: 80
  - Density: 4.7/km^{2} (12/sq mi)
- Time zone: UTC+1 (CET)
  - Summer (DST): UTC+2 (CEST)
- Website: Official website

Ucero is a municipality located in the province of Soria, Castile and León, Spain. According to the 2004 census (INE), the municipality has a population of 98 inhabitants.

It lies on the River Ucero which runs to El Burgo de Osma to the south and then into the River Duero, and is the natural entrance to the Cañón del Río Lobos Natural Park. It contains the castle of Ucero and several hermitages.
