= Santa María de las Hoyas =

- Municipality
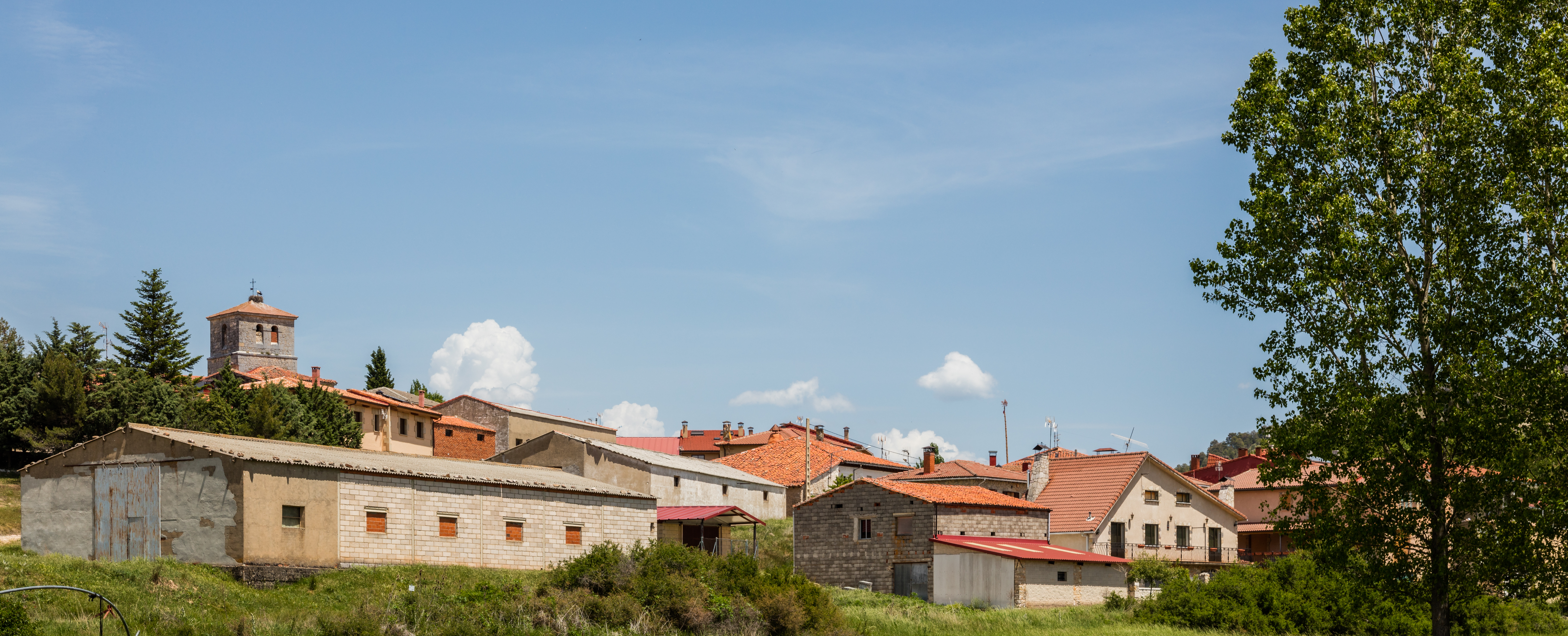

- Location in Spain. Santa María de las Hoyas (Spain)
- Coordinates: 41°46′17″N 3°08′31″W
- Country: Spain
- Autonomous community: Castile and León
- Province: Soria
- Municipality: Santa María de las Hoyas

Area
  - Total: 45 km^{2} (17 sq mi)
- Elevation: 1,071 m (3,514 ft)

Population (2025-01-01)
  - Total: 112
  - Density: 2.5/km^{2} (6.4/sq mi)
- Time zone: UTC+1 (CET)
  - Summer (DST): UTC+2 (CEST)
- Website: Official website

Santa María de las Hoyas is a municipality located in the province of Soria, Castile and León, Spain. According to the 2010 census (INE), the municipality has a population of 156 inhabitants.

The town is 60 km by car from the capital of the province, Soria, and 30 km from El Burgo de Osma. Most of the land in the municipality is occupied by forests of pine trees, in which grow a wide variety of mushrooms, and wheat fields.

The area also includes part of the Cañón del Río Lobos Natural Park. A Gothic church, built in 1232, is located in the town.
