= Cañón del Río Lobos Natural Park =

Natural park in Spain

- Cañón dle Río Lobos
- IUCN category V (protected landscape/seascape)
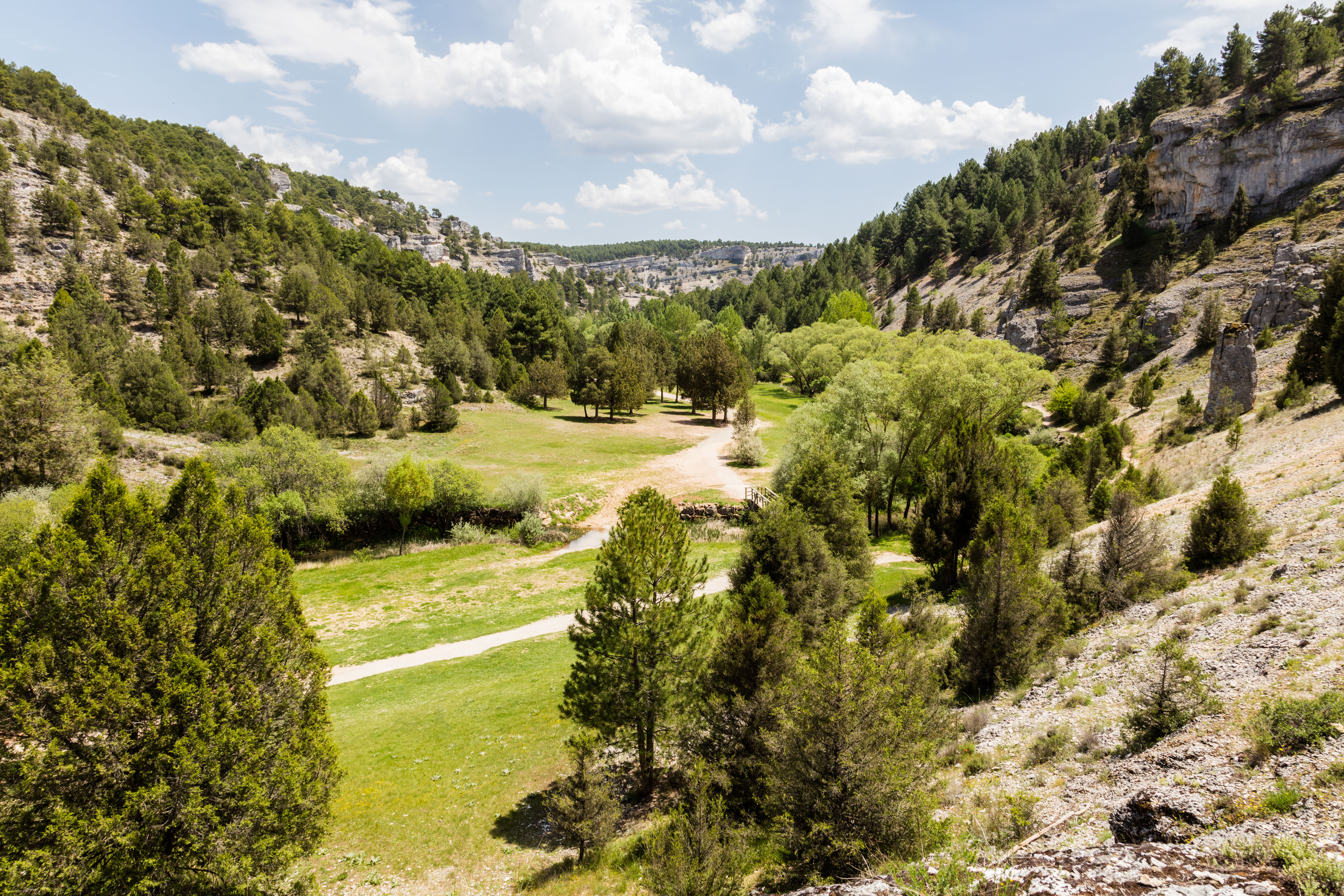

- Location within Spain
- Location: Province of Soria, Spain
- Nearest city: San Leonardo de Yagüe, Ucero
- Coordinates: 41.79°N 3.11°W
- Established: October 10, 1985
- Governing body: Junta de Castilla y León

Cañón del Río Lobos Natural Park is a natural park protected by the autonomous community of Castile and León, Spain. Two thirds of the park are located in the province of Soria and another third is in the province of Burgos. It is a limestone landscape. It includes a Special Protection Area.

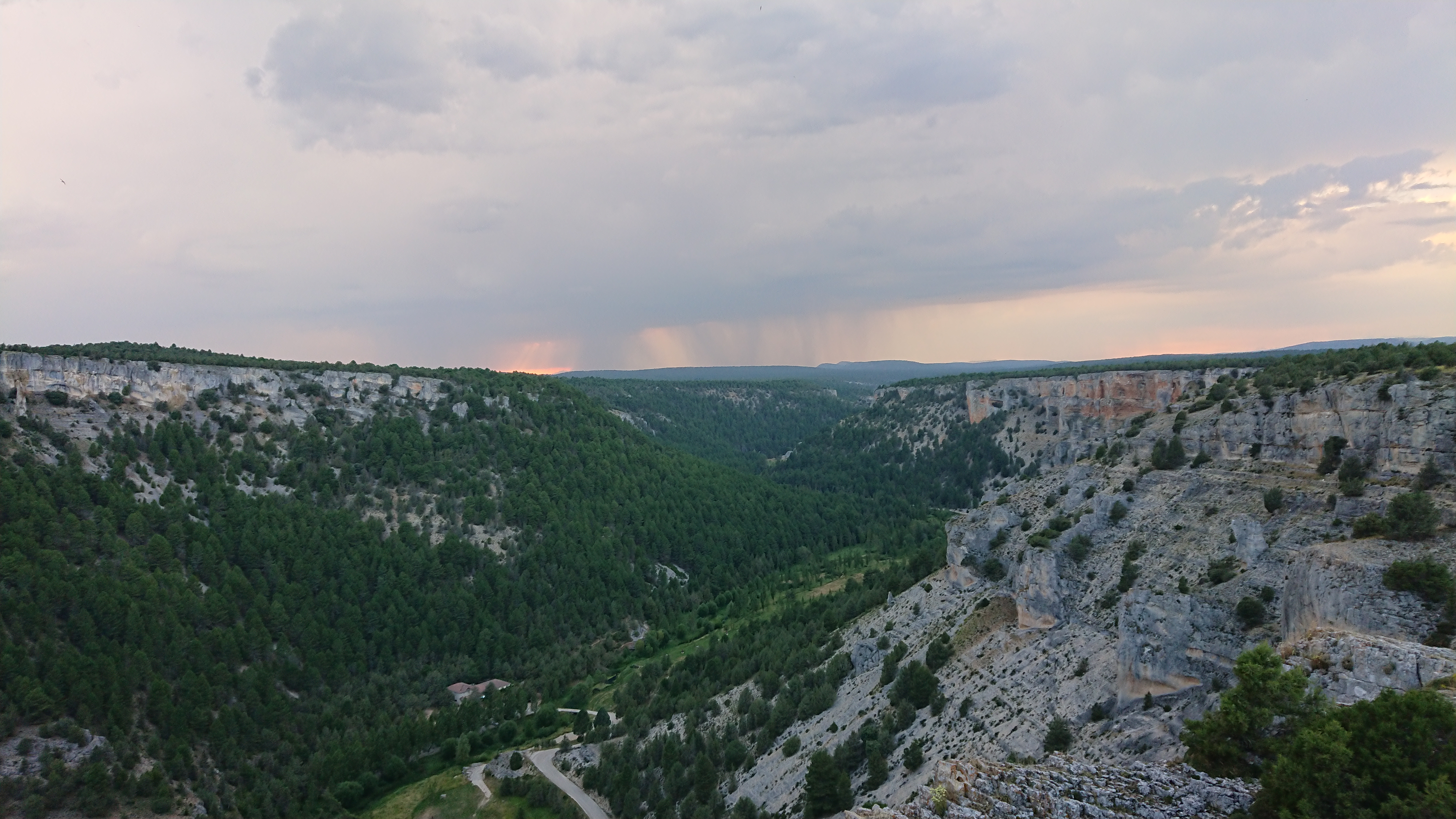
Cañón del Río Lobos
