= Villanueva de Gormaz =

- Municipality
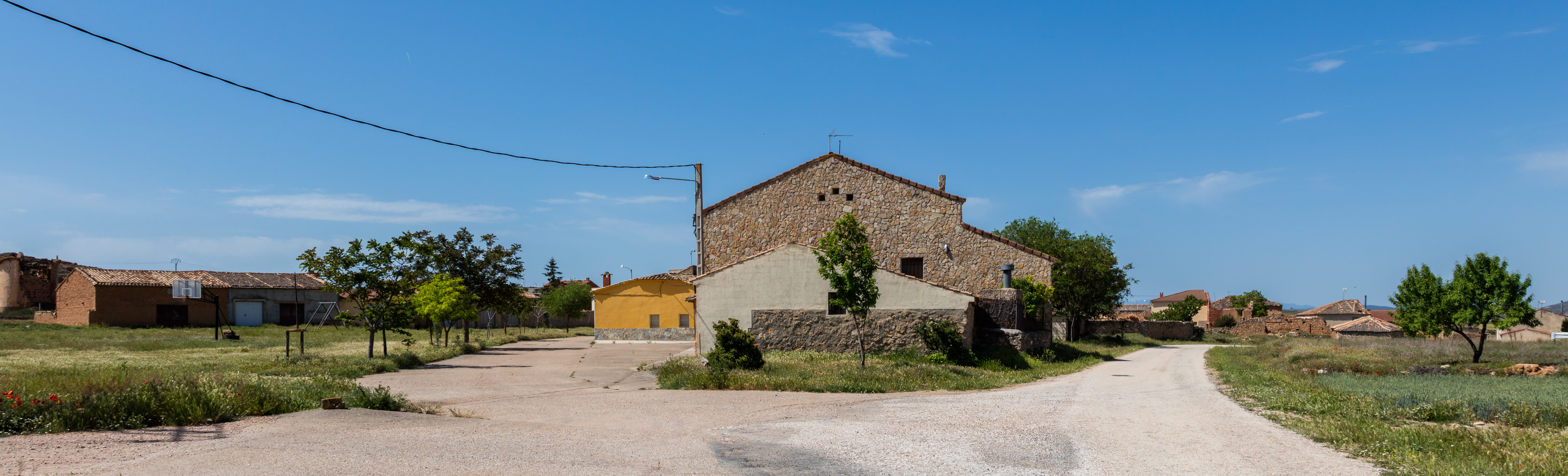

- Location in Spain. Villanueva de Gormaz (Spain)
- Coordinates: 41°28′N 3°04′W
- Country: Spain
- Autonomous community: Castile and León
- Province: Soria
- Municipality: Villanueva de Gormaz

Area
  - Total: 21.43 km^{2} (8.27 sq mi)
- Elevation: 966 m (3,169 ft)

Population (2025)
  - Total: 6
  - Density: 0.28/km^{2} (0.73/sq mi)
- Time zone: UTC+1 (CET)
  - Summer (DST): UTC+2 (CEST)
- Website: Official website

Villanueva de Gormaz is a municipality located in the province of Soria, Castile and León, Spain. According to the 2025 census (INE), the municipality had a population of 6 inhabitants.

== Demography ==
According to the 2004 census (INE), the municipality had a population of 23 inhabitants.

According to the 2025 census (INE), the municipality had a population of 6 inhabitants.

== Gallery ==
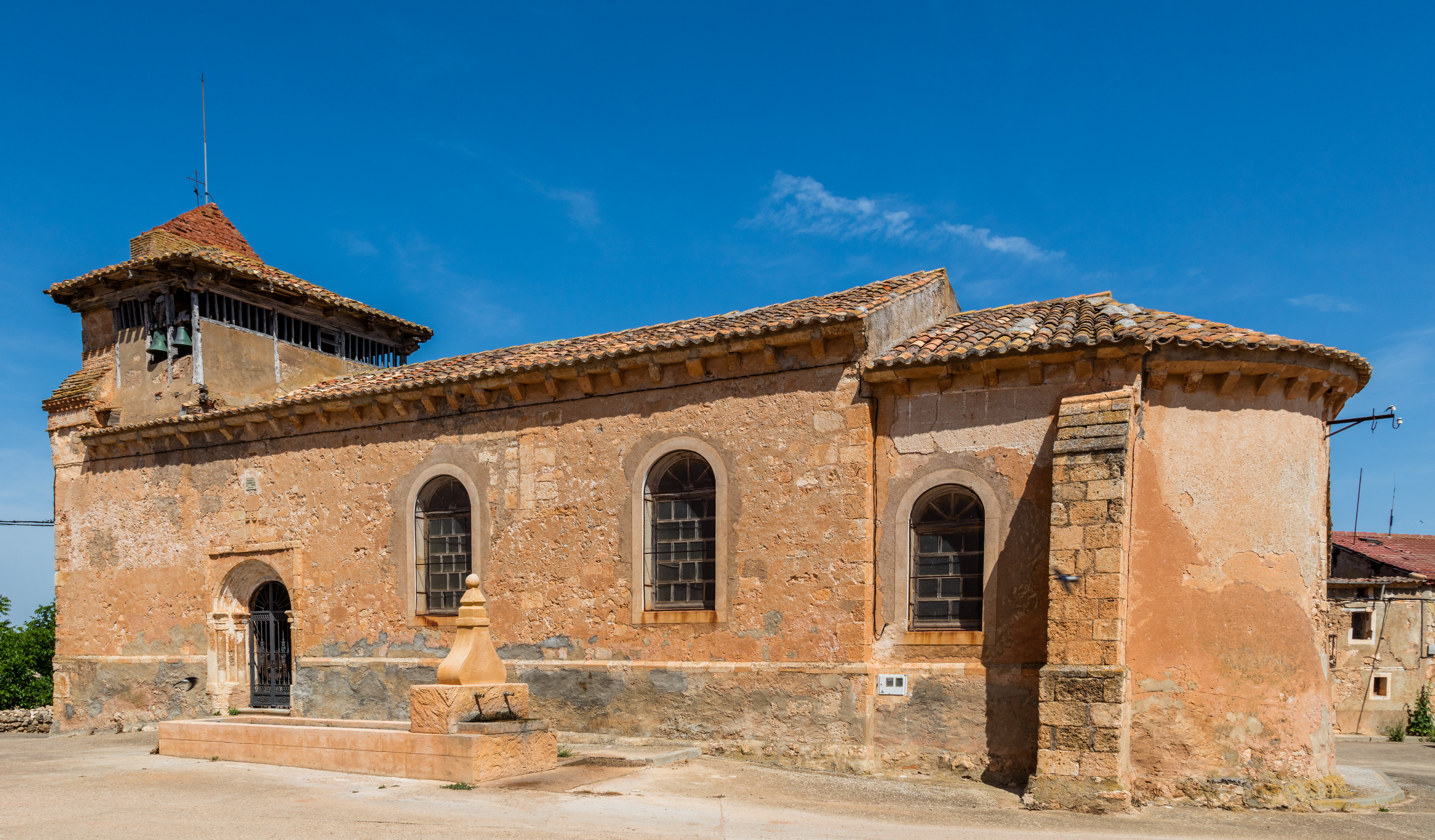
Church of San Pedro

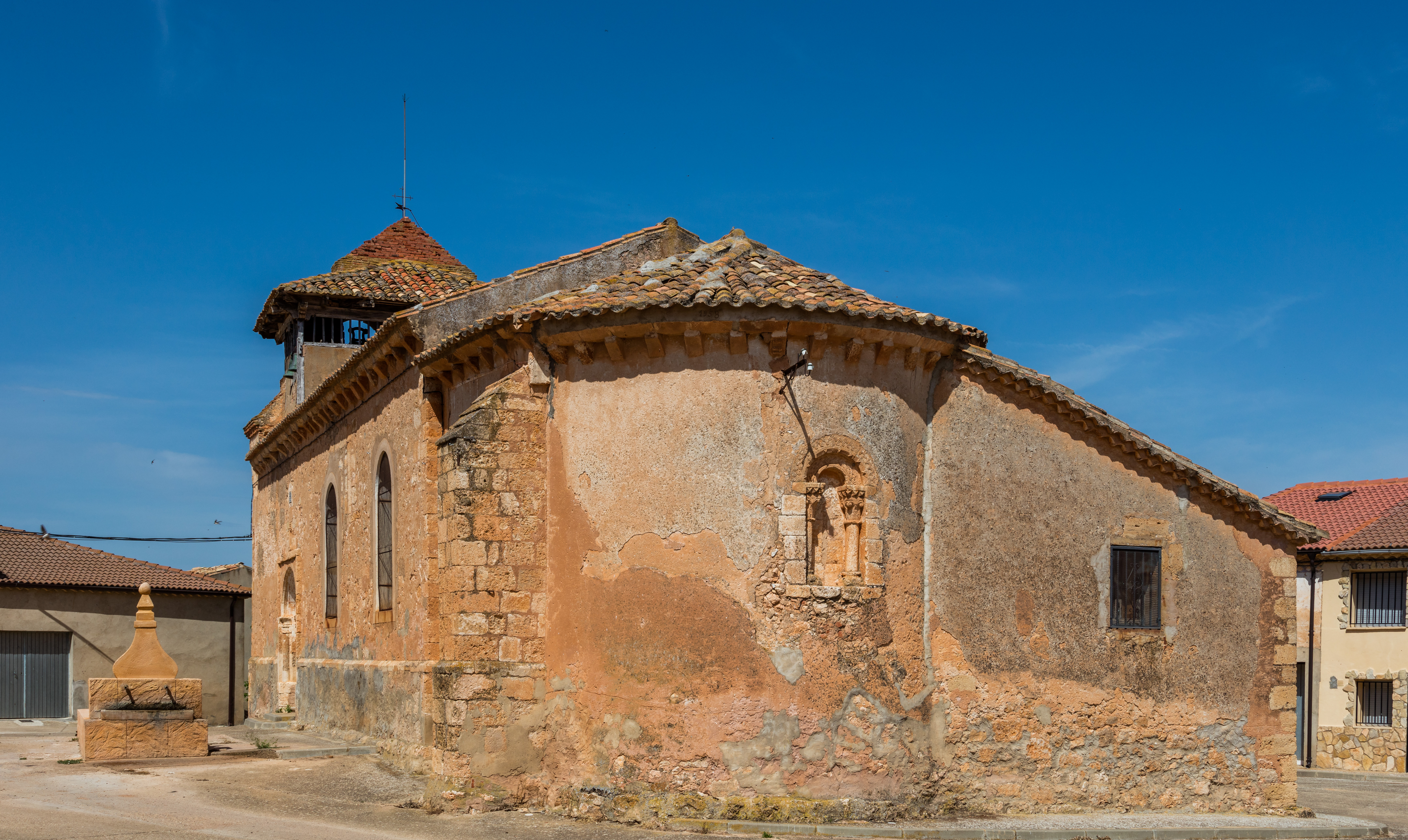

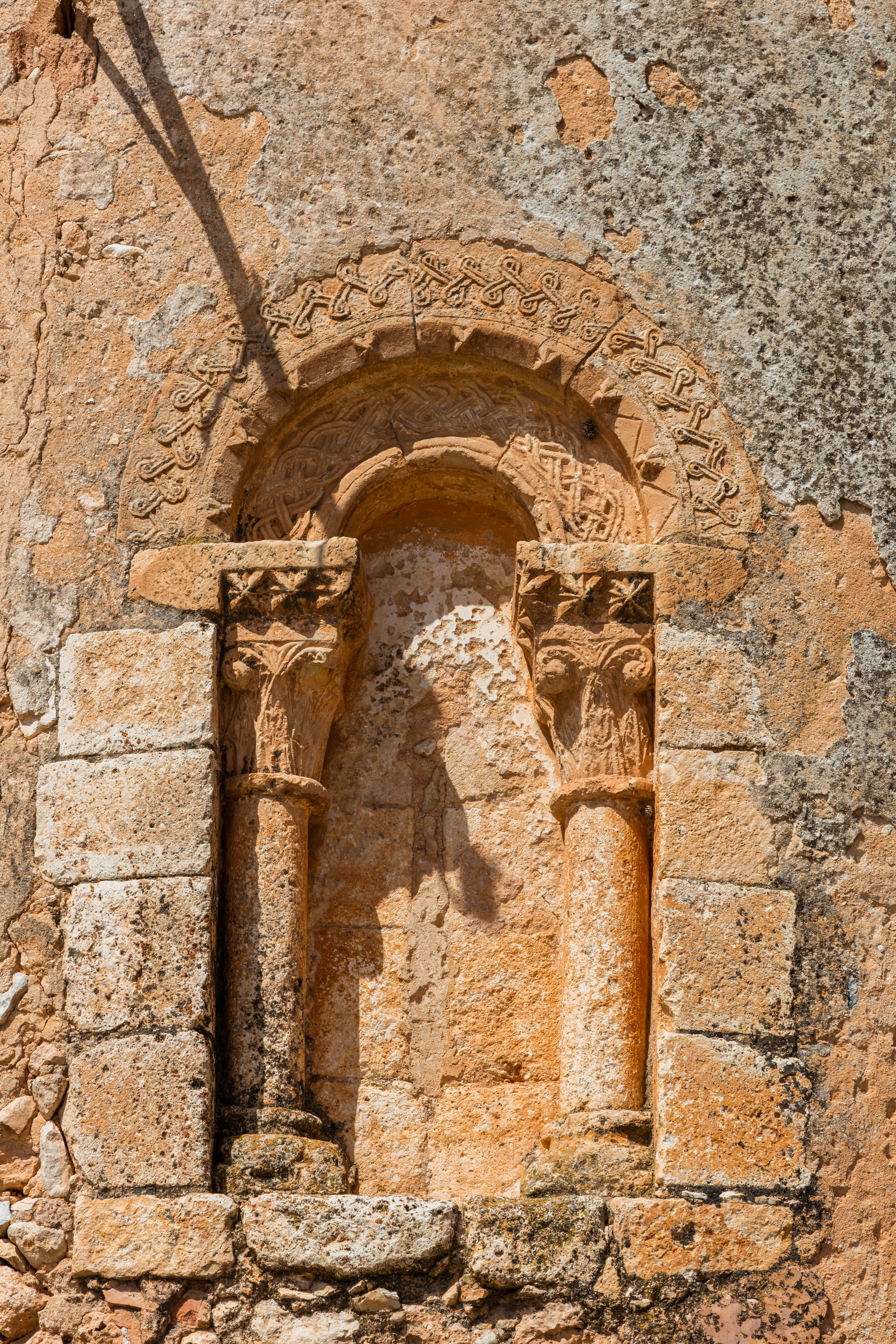
Detail of a window in the Church of San Pedro

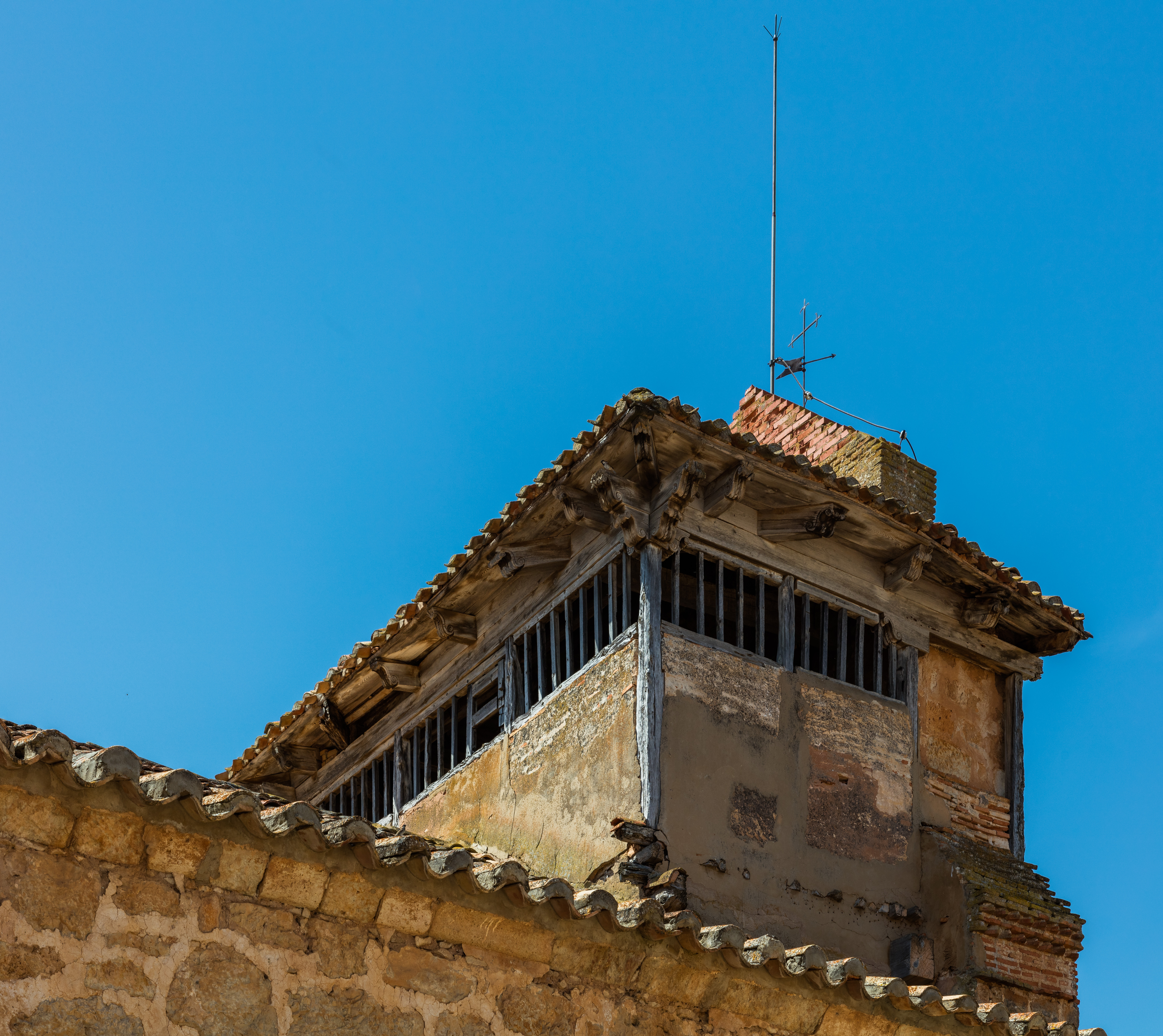
Church bell tower

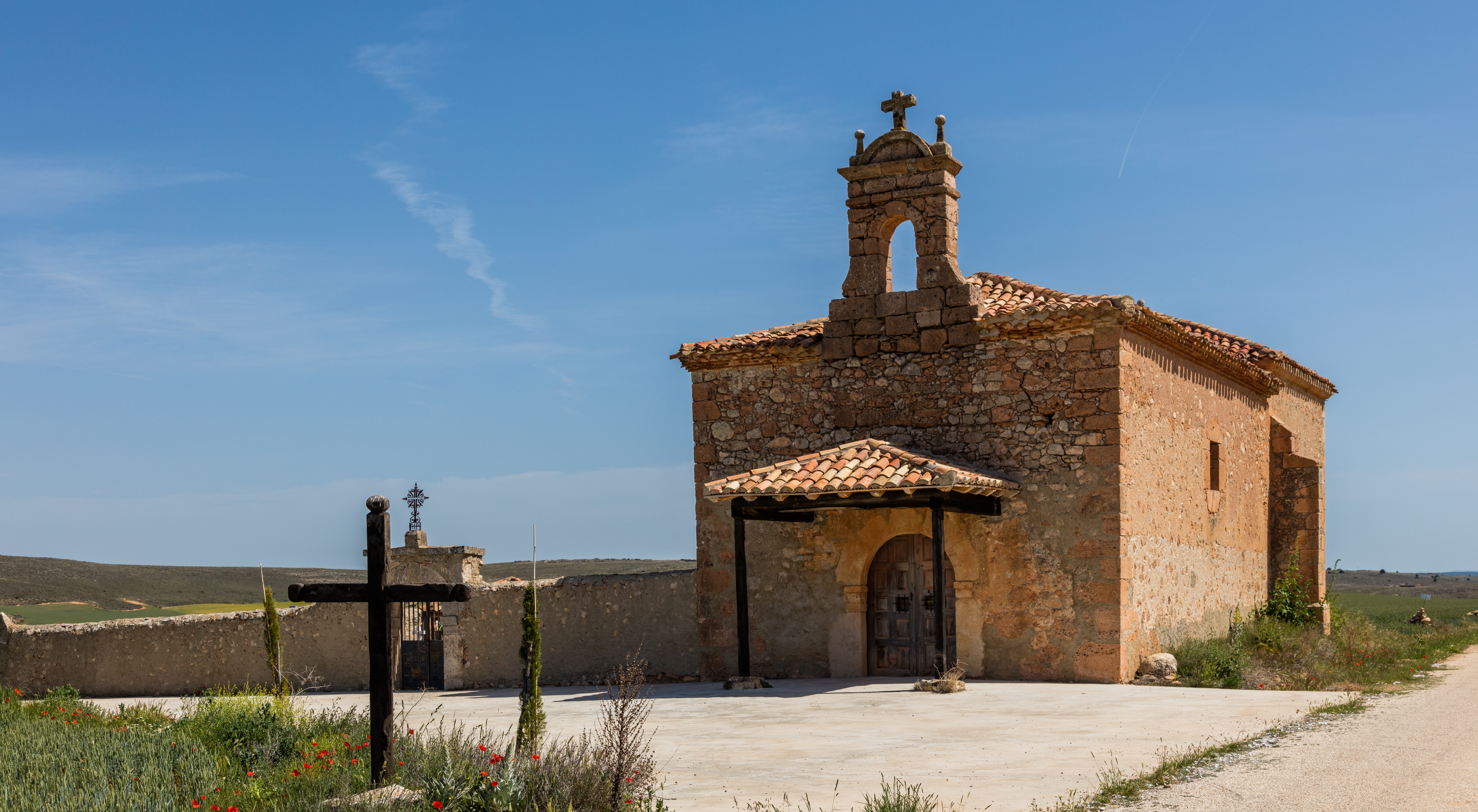
Hermitage of the Santo Cristo
