= Alcubilla de las Peñas =

- Municipality
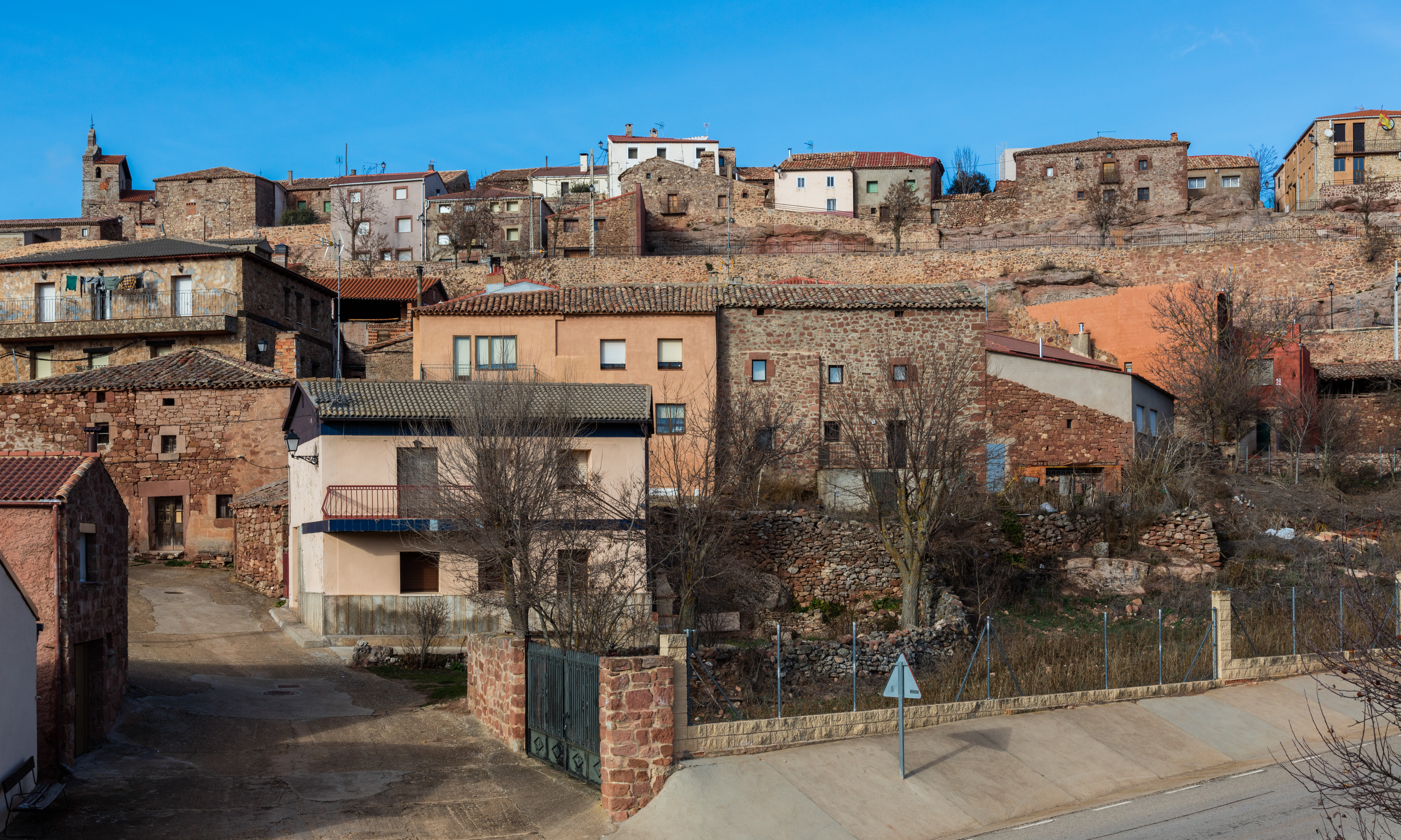

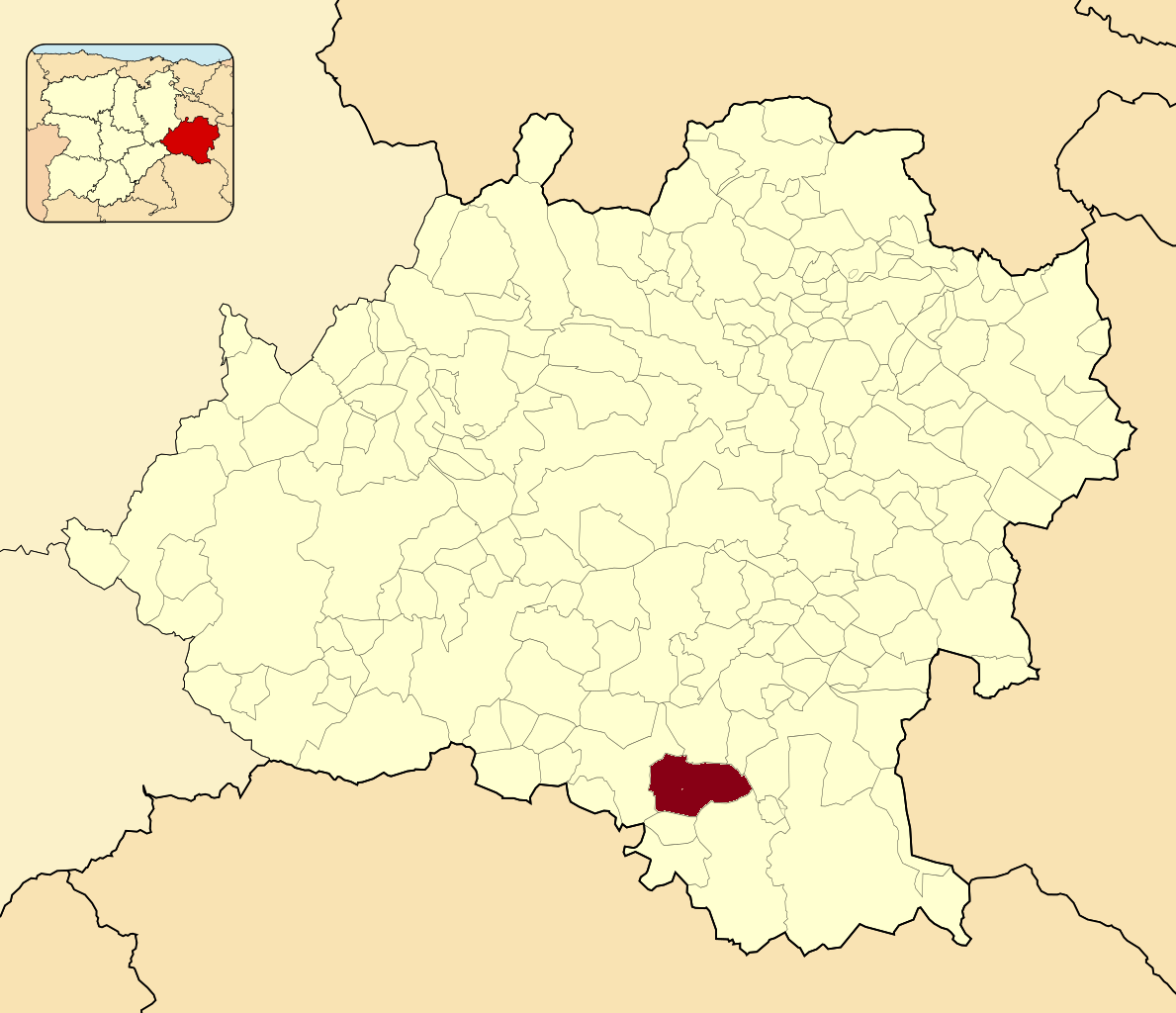
- Municipal location in the Province of Soria.

- Location in Spain Alcubilla de las Peñas (Spain)
- Coordinates: 41°15′04″N 2°31′37″W
- Country: Spain
- Autonomous community: Castilla y León
- Province: Soria
- Comarca: Arcos de Jalon

Government
  - Alcalde: Juan Luis Antón Antón (2019-2023) (PP)

Area
  - Total: 59 km^{2} (23 sq mi)
- Elevation: 1,124 m (3,688 ft)

Population (2025-01-01)
  - Total: 61
  - Density: 0.72/km^{2} (1.9/sq mi)
- Time zone: UTC+1 (CET)
  - Summer (DST): UTC+2 (CEST)
- Postal code: 42213

Alcubilla de las Peñas is a municipality located in the province of Soria, Castile and León, Spain. According to the 2004 census (INE), the municipality has a population of 82 inhabitants.

== Places of interest ==
- Included in the Natura 200 Network:

- Site of Community Importance known as Altos de Radona, occupying 3239 hectares
- Special Protection Area known as Altos de Radona occupying 4089 hectares

- Torre de la Senda is an Emiral-Caliphate era watchtower which received Bien de Interés Cultural designation on June 1, 1983.
