= Aldealafuente =

- Municipality
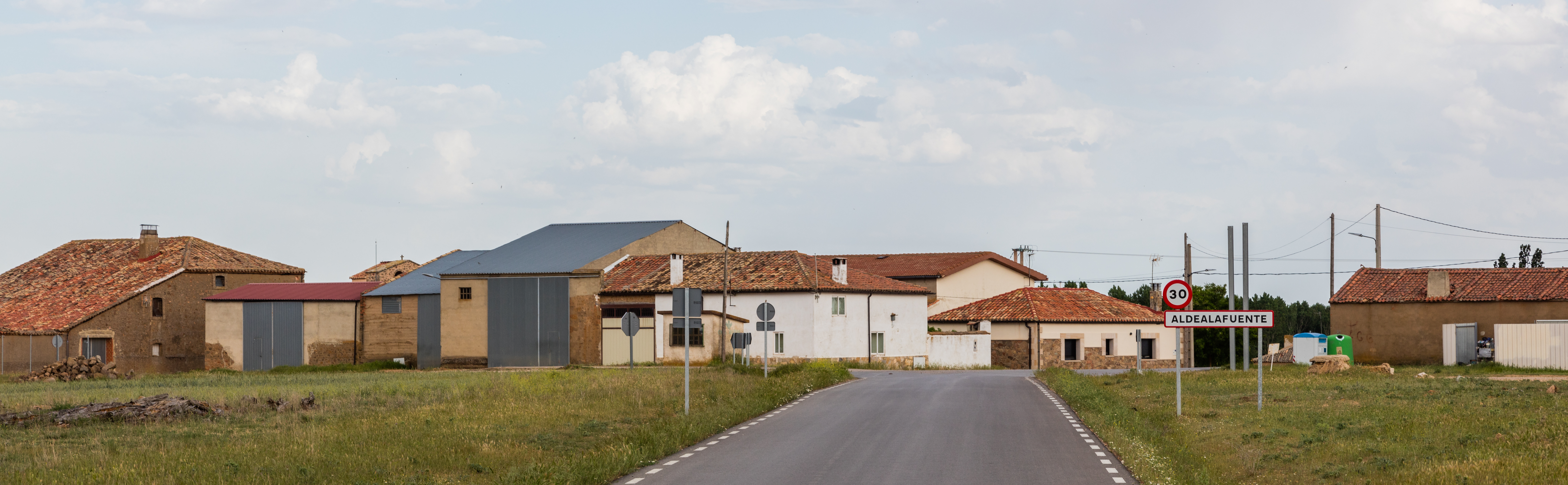

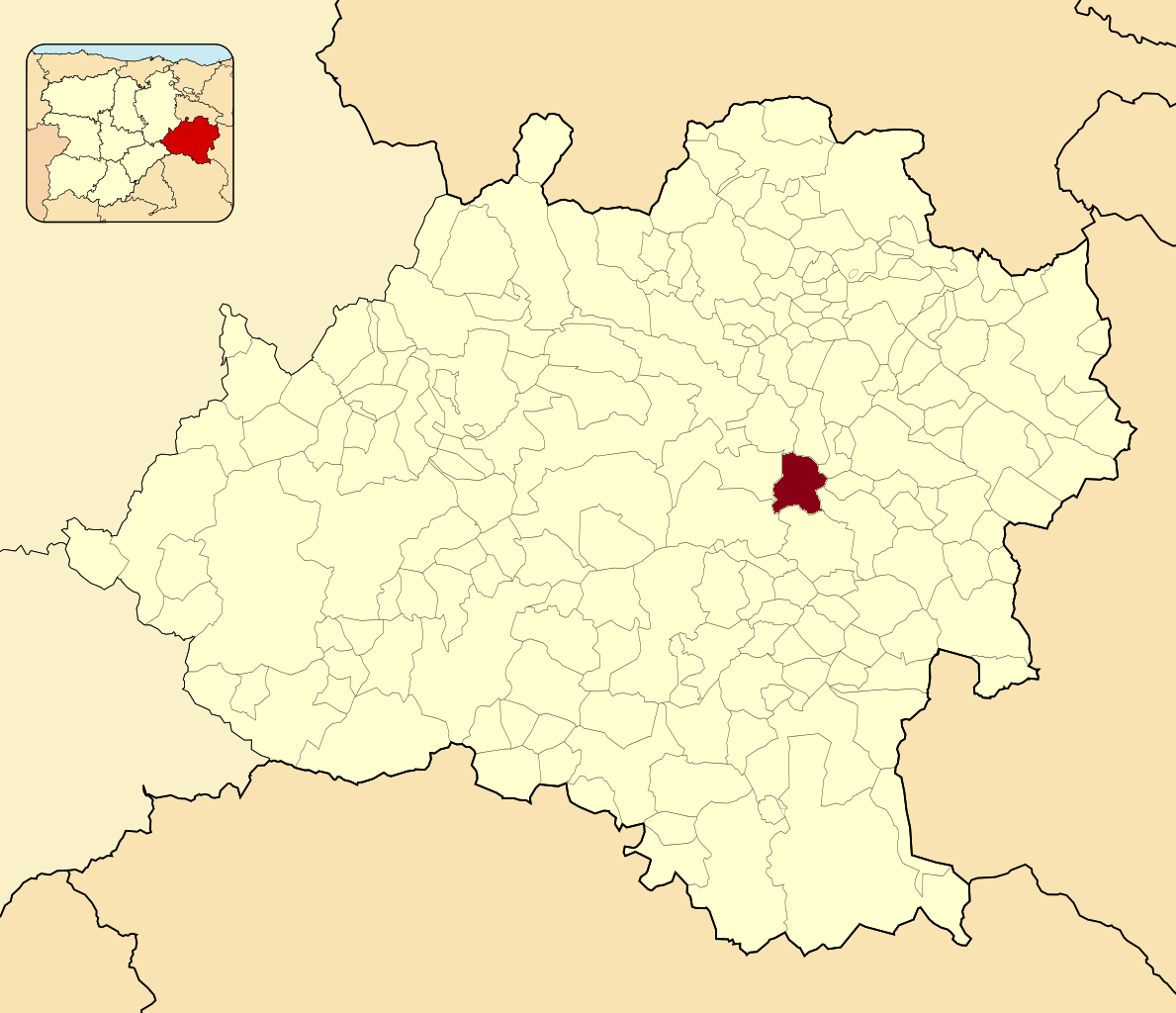
- Municipal location in the Province of Soria.

- Location in Spain Aldealafuente (Spain)
- Coordinates: 41°40′17″N 2°19′30″W
- Country: Spain
- Autonomous community: Castilla y León
- Province: Soria
- Comarca: Campo de Gomara

Government
  - Alcalde: Miguel Angel Silverio Lazaro (2019–2023) (PSOE)

Area
  - Total: 45.72 km^{2} (17.65 sq mi)
- Elevation: 1,009 m (3,310 ft)

Population (2025-01-01)
  - Total: 85
  - Density: 1.95/km^{2} (5.1/sq mi)
- Time zone: UTC+1 (CET)
  - Summer (DST): UTC+2 (CEST)
- Postal code: 42134
- Website: aldealafuente.es

Aldealafuente is a municipality located in the province of Soria, Castile and León, Spain. According to the 2004 census (INE), the municipality has a population of 129 inhabitants.

== History ==
The place during the Middle Ages belonged to the Comunidad de Villa y Tierra de Soria, which formed part of Sexmo de Lubia.

== Settlements ==
Settlement	Population (2000)	Population (2010)
Aldealafuente	93	79
Ribarroya	38	22
Tapiela	22	12
