= Arancón =

- Municipality
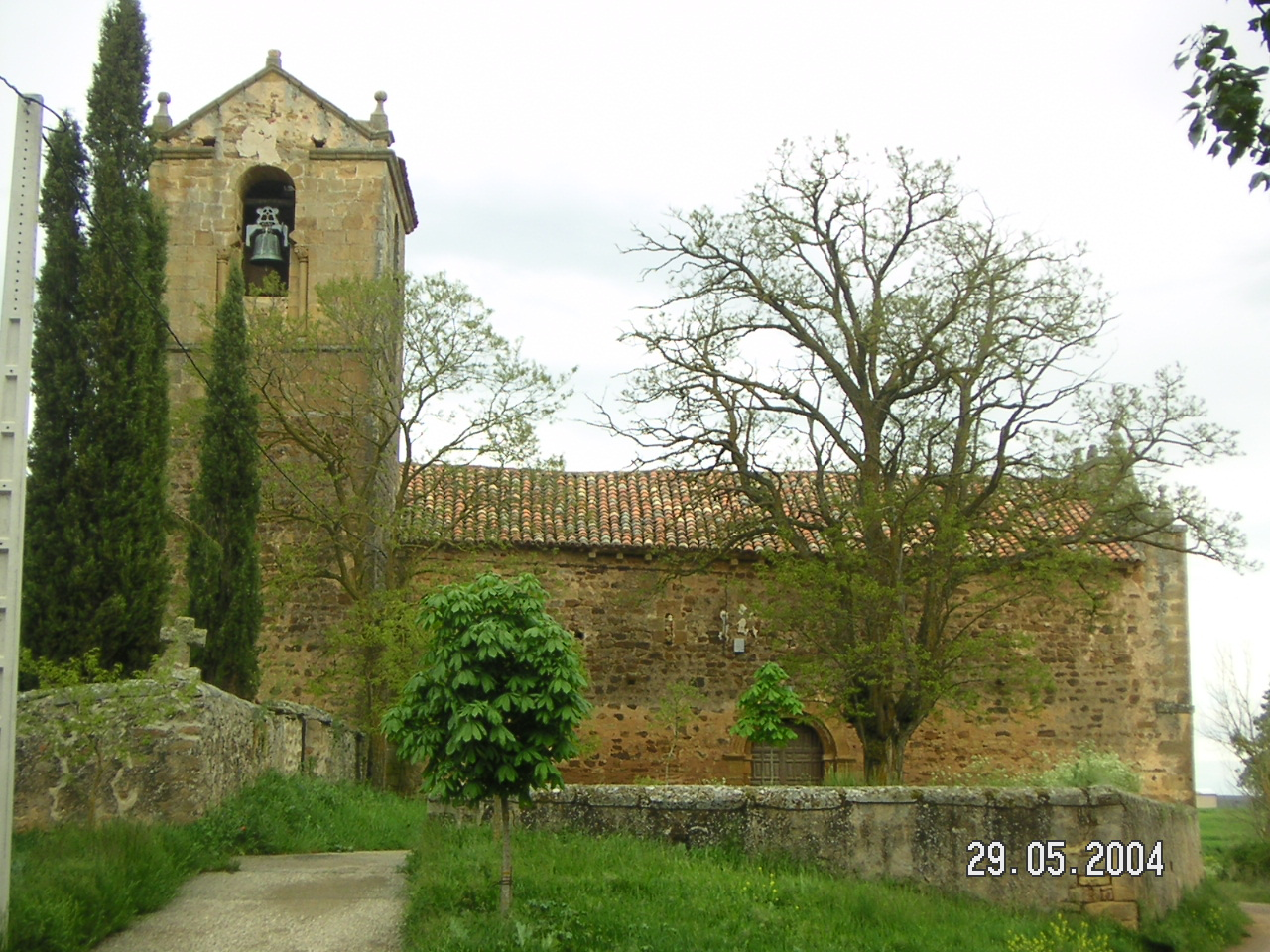
- Asunción church

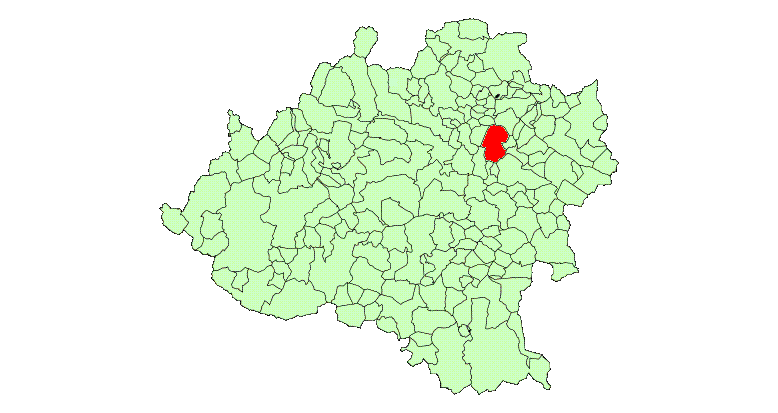

- Location in Spain. Arancón (Spain)
- Country: Spain
- Autonomous community: Castile and León
- Province: Soria
- Comarca: Campo de Gómara
- Judicial district: Soria
- Municipality: Arancón

Government
  - Alcalde: Gregorio García Martín (2007) (PP)

Area
  - Total: 77.61 km^{2} (29.97 sq mi)
- Elevation: 1,065 m (3,494 ft)

Population (2025-01-01)
  - Total: 73
  - Density: 0.94/km^{2} (2.4/sq mi)
- Time zone: UTC+1 (CET)
  - Summer (DST): UTC+2 (CEST)
- Postal code: 42180
- Dialing code: 975
- Website: Official website

Arancón is a municipality in the province of Soria, Spain, located at the foot of the mountain range of El Almuerzo and Mount Cencejo. The localities that make up the municipality are Arancón, Tozalmoro, Omeñaca, Calderuela, Nieva de Calderuela and Cortos.

== Main sights ==
- Roman road: Via 27 of Antonino, which united Caesaraugusta (Zaragoza) with Asturica Augusta (Astorga).
- Medieval source of La rana ("The Frog")
- Two Roman milliarium are exposed in a public garden next to the Church. They were used during the Middle Ages to lay the foundations of a bridge. Arancón can be considered the milliarium capital in Soria. After the church there are another two milliarium.
- Asunción romanesque church (Arancón)
- Concepción church (Omeñaca)
- Saint Bartholomew hermitage ruins

== Economy ==
- Culture of wheat, rye, barley and sunflower
- Sheep cattle and pasture rent
- Greater hunting boundary

== Flora and fauna ==
Flora includes holm-oak, rivets, steppe, tea, camomile, heather and lavender.

Wildlife includes wild boar, red deer, roe deer, rabbit, hare and partridge.
