= Rebollar =

Rebollar may refer to:

- Rebollar, Cáceres, a municipality in the province of Cáceres, Extremadura, Spain.
- Rebollar, Soria, a municipality in the province of Soria, Castile and León, Spain.
