= Rebollar, Soria =

Rebollar
- Municipality
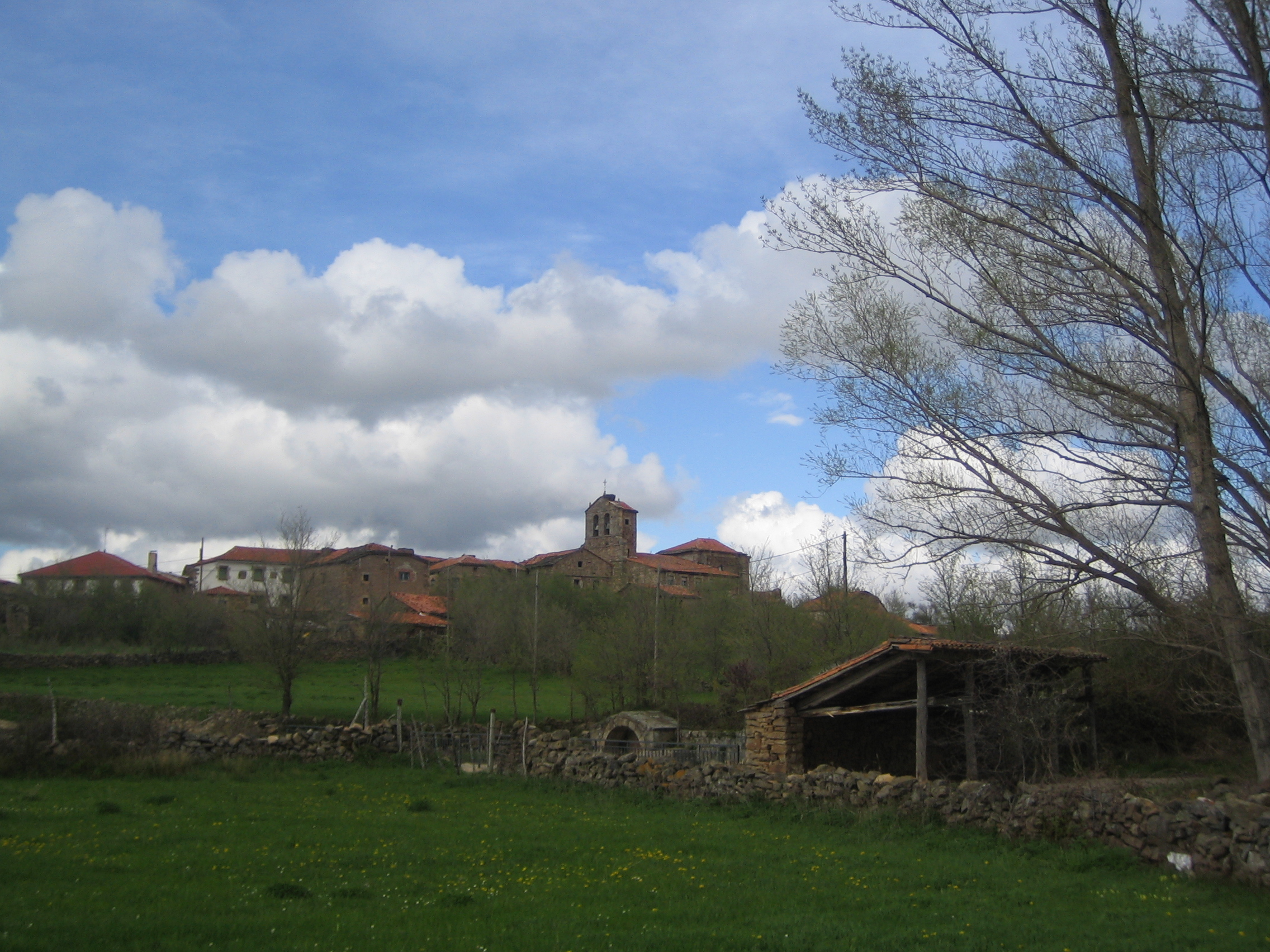

- Location in Spain. Rebollar (Spain)
- Coordinates: 41°54′19″N 2°30′18″W
- Country: Spain
- Autonomous community: Castile and León
- Province: Soria
- Comarca: El Valle

Government
  - Mayor: Jerónimo Crespo

Area
  - Total: 10.38 km^{2} (4.01 sq mi)
- Elevation: 1,134 m (3,720 ft)

Population (2025-01-01)
  - Total: 36
  - Density: 3.5/km^{2} (9.0/sq mi)
- Time zone: UTC+1 (CET)
  - Summer (DST): UTC+2 (CEST)
- Climate: Cfb

Rebollar is a municipality located in the province of Soria, Castile and León, Spain.
