= Rollamienta =

- Municipality
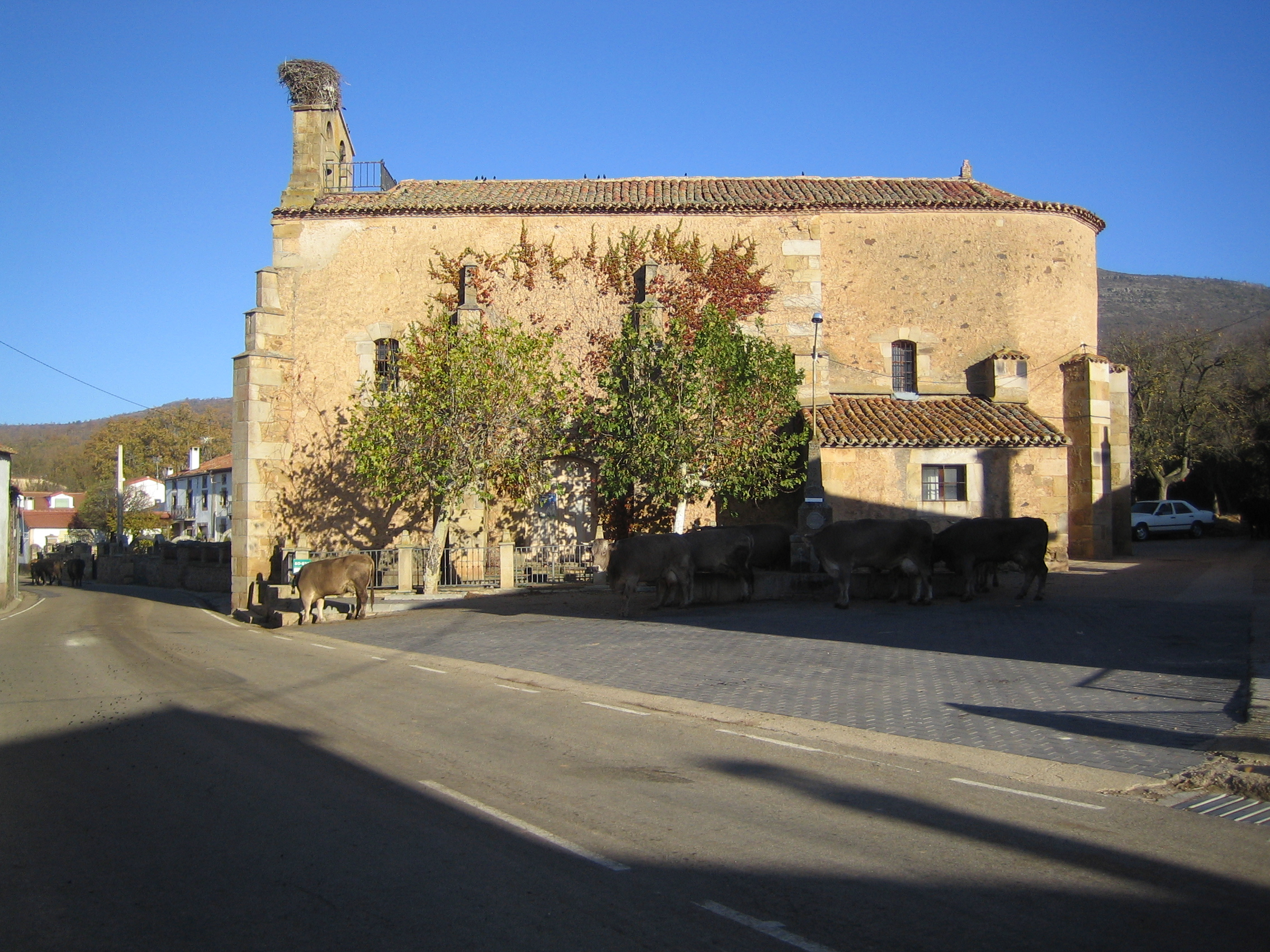
- Parish Church of Rollamienta

- Location in Spain. Rollamienta (Spain)
- Coordinates: 41°55′45″N 2°32′09″W
- Country: Spain
- Autonomous community: Castile and León
- Province: Soria
- Municipality: Rollamienta

Area
  - Total: 18.62 km^{2} (7.19 sq mi)
- Elevation: 1,161 m (3,809 ft)

Population (2025-01-01)
  - Total: 49
  - Density: 2.6/km^{2} (6.8/sq mi)
- Time zone: UTC+1 (CET)
  - Summer (DST): UTC+2 (CEST)
- Website: Official website

Rollamienta is a municipality located in the province of Soria, Castile and León, Spain. According to the 2004 census (INE), the municipality had a population of 49 inhabitants.
