= Herrera de Soria =

- Municipality
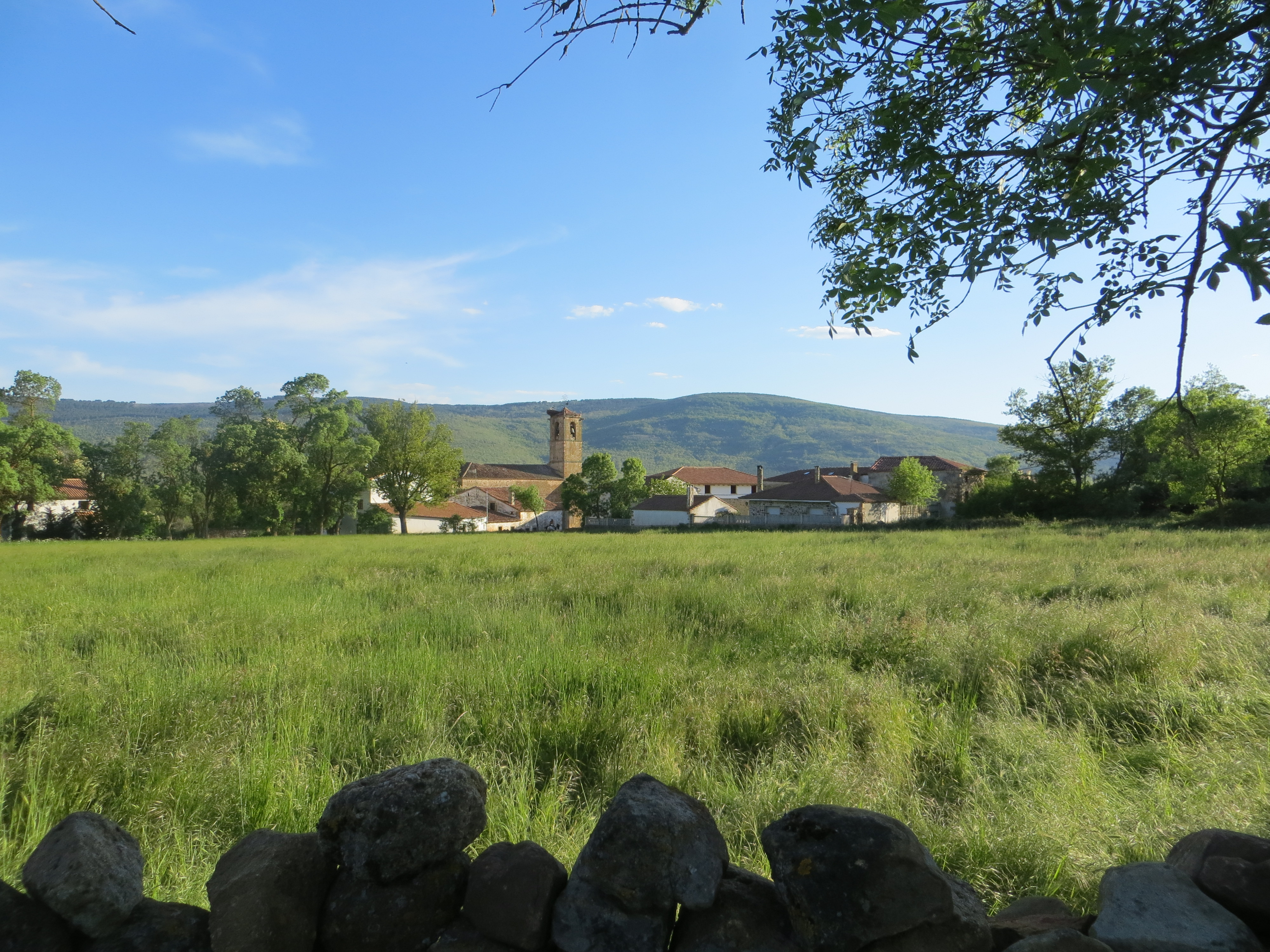

- Location in Spain. Herrera de Soria (Spain)
- Coordinates: 41°45′46″N 3°00′44″W
- Country: Spain
- Autonomous community: Castile and León
- Province: Soria
- Municipality: Herrera de Soria

Area
  - Total: 26.07 km^{2} (10.07 sq mi)
- Elevation: 1,094 m (3,589 ft)

Population (2025-01-01)
  - Total: 12
  - Density: 0.46/km^{2} (1.2/sq mi)
- Time zone: UTC+1 (CET)
  - Summer (DST): UTC+2 (CEST)
- Website: Official website

Herrera de Soria is a municipality located in the province of Soria, Castile and León, Spain. According to the 2004 census (INE), the municipality had a population of 21 inhabitants.
