= Trévago =

- Municipality
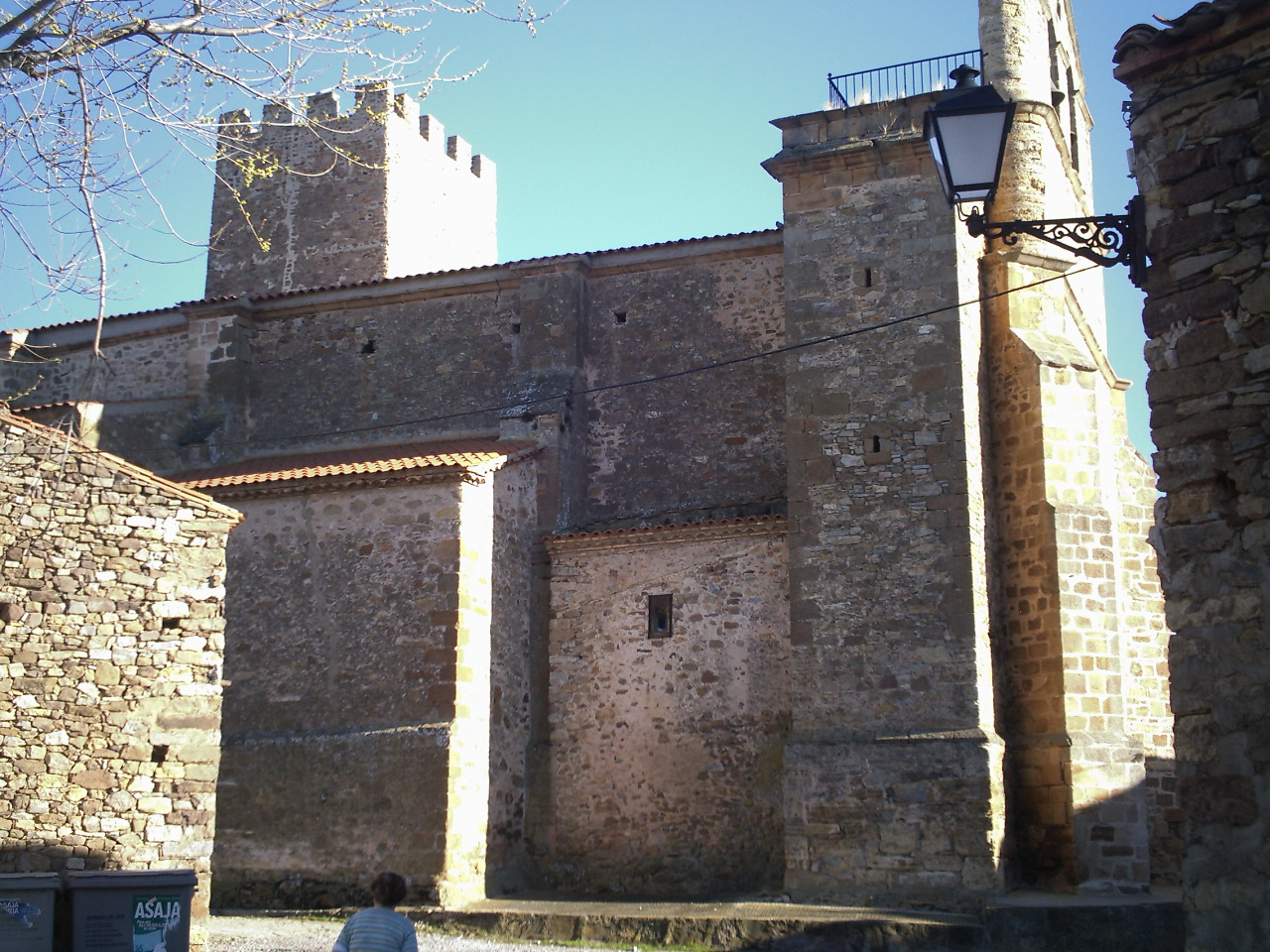
- Asunción church in Trévago

- Location in Spain. Trévago (Spain)
- Coordinates: 41°52′26″N 2°06′08″W
- Country: Spain
- Autonomous community: Castile and León
- Province: Soria
- Municipality: Trévago

Area
  - Total: 20 km^{2} (7.7 sq mi)
- Elevation: 1,046 m (3,432 ft)

Population (2025-01-01)
  - Total: 47
  - Density: 2.4/km^{2} (6.1/sq mi)
- Time zone: UTC+1 (CET)
  - Summer (DST): UTC+2 (CEST)
- Website: Official website

Trévago or Trébago is a municipality located in the province of Soria, Castile and León, Spain. According to the 2004 census (INE), the municipality has a population of 90 inhabitants.
