= Valdelagua del Cerro =

- Municipality
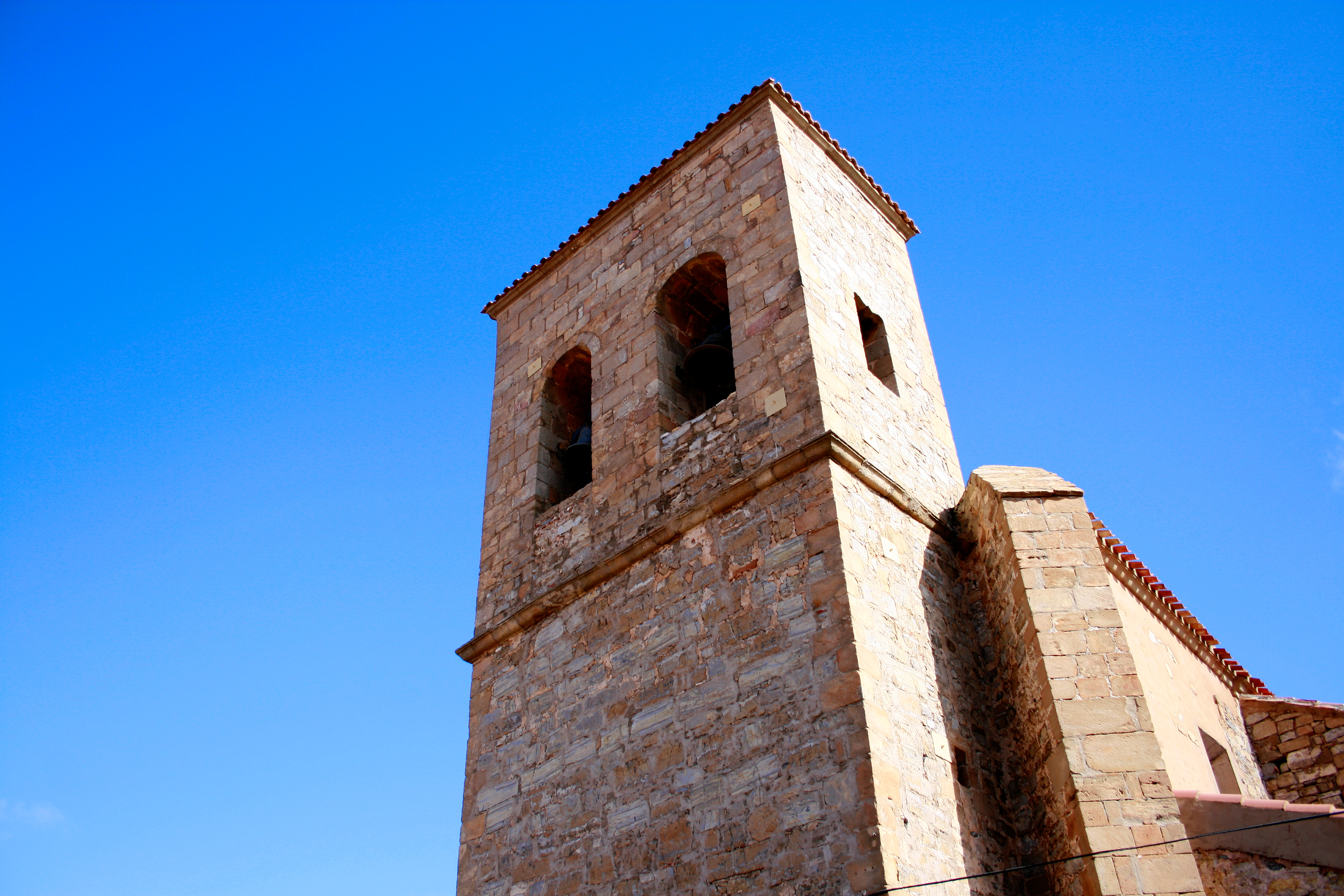

- Location in Spain. Valdelagua del Cerro (Spain)
- Coordinates: 41°53′16″N 2°06′59″W
- Country: Spain
- Autonomous community: Castile and León
- Province: Soria
- Comarca: Tierras Altas

Government
  - Mayor: Domingo Cacho Izquierdo

Area
  - Total: 4.85 km^{2} (1.87 sq mi)
- Elevation: 1,095 m (3,593 ft)

Population (2025-01-01)
  - Total: 13
  - Density: 2.7/km^{2} (6.9/sq mi)
- Time zone: UTC+1 (CET)
  - Summer (DST): UTC+2 (CEST)
- Website: Official website

Valdelagua del Cerro is a municipality located in the province of Soria, Castile and León, Spain. As of 2016, it has 20 inhabitants.
