= Fuentecambrón =

- Municipality
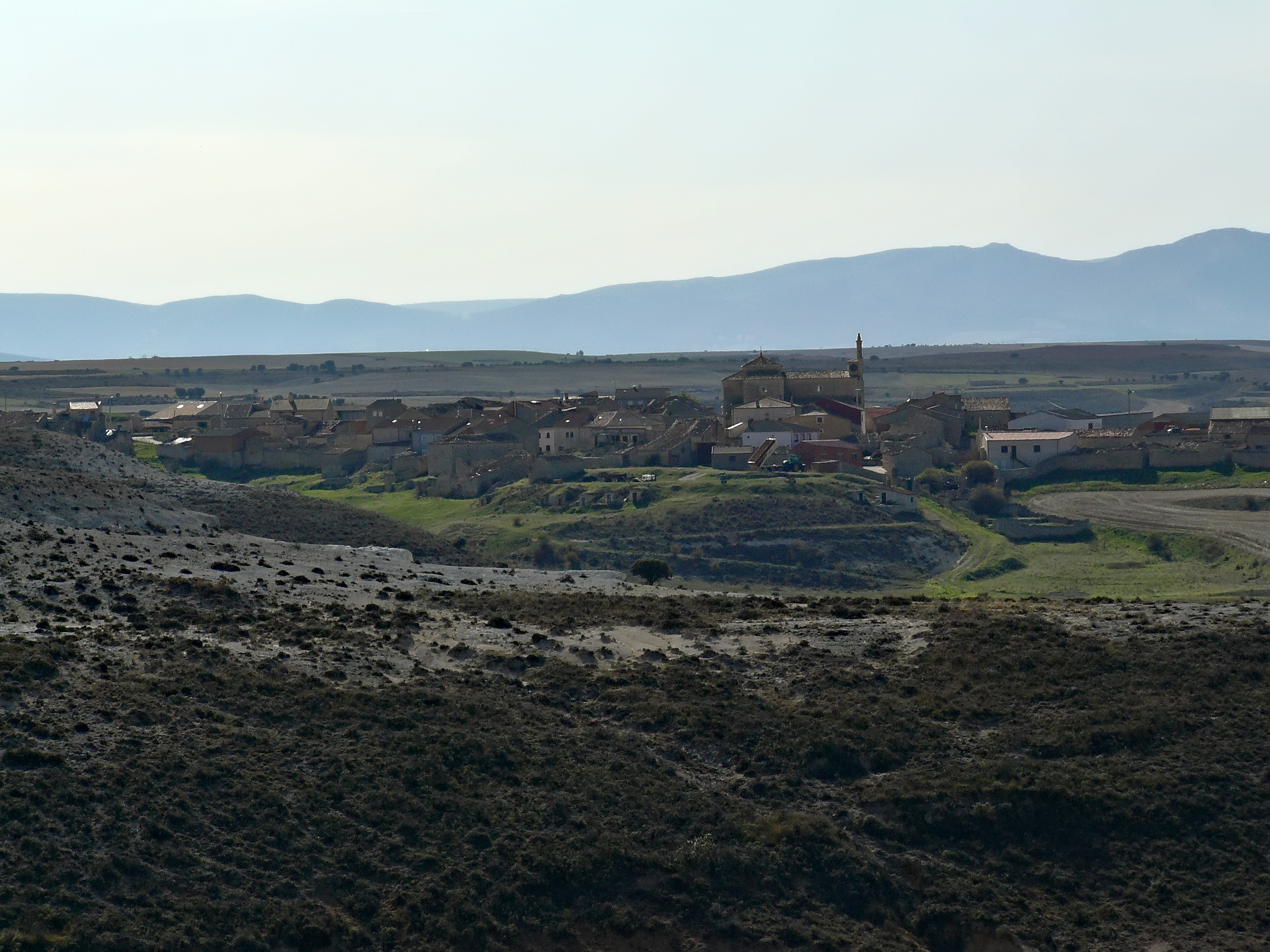
- Fuentecambrón, a distant view

- Location in Spain. Fuentecambrón (Spain)
- Coordinates: 41°30′19″N 3°19′41″W
- Country: Spain
- Autonomous community: Castile and León
- Province: Soria
- Municipality: Fuentecambrón

Area
  - Total: 48 km^{2} (19 sq mi)

Population (2025-01-01)
  - Total: 29
  - Density: 0.60/km^{2} (1.6/sq mi)
- Time zone: UTC+1 (CET)
  - Summer (DST): UTC+2 (CEST)
- Website: Official website

Fuentecambrón is a municipality located in the province of Soria, Castile and León, Spain. According to the 2004 census (INE), the municipality has a population of 58 inhabitants.
