= Fuentepinilla =

- Municipality
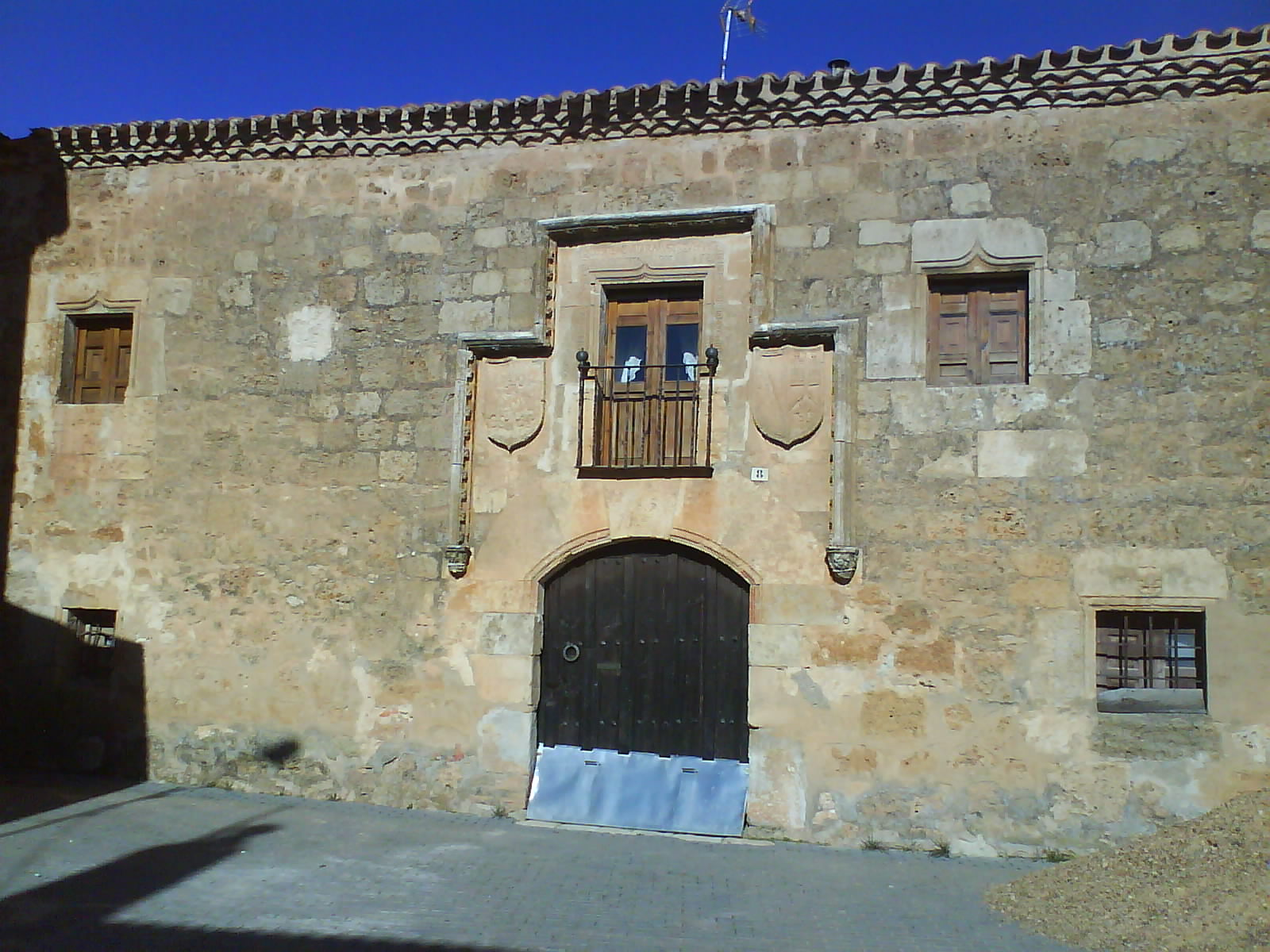
- Palace of Fuente Pinilla

- Location in Spain. Fuentepinilla (Spain)
- Coordinates: 41°33′57″N 2°45′47″W
- Country: Spain
- Autonomous community: Castile and León
- Province: Soria
- Municipality: Fuentepinilla

Area
  - Total: 52 km^{2} (20 sq mi)

Population (2025-01-01)
  - Total: 73
  - Density: 1.4/km^{2} (3.6/sq mi)
- Time zone: UTC+1 (CET)
  - Summer (DST): UTC+2 (CEST)
- Website: Official website

Fuentepinilla is a municipality located in the province of Soria, Castile and León, Spain. According to the 2004 census (INE), the municipality has a population of 142 inhabitants.
