= Valdegeña =

- Municipality
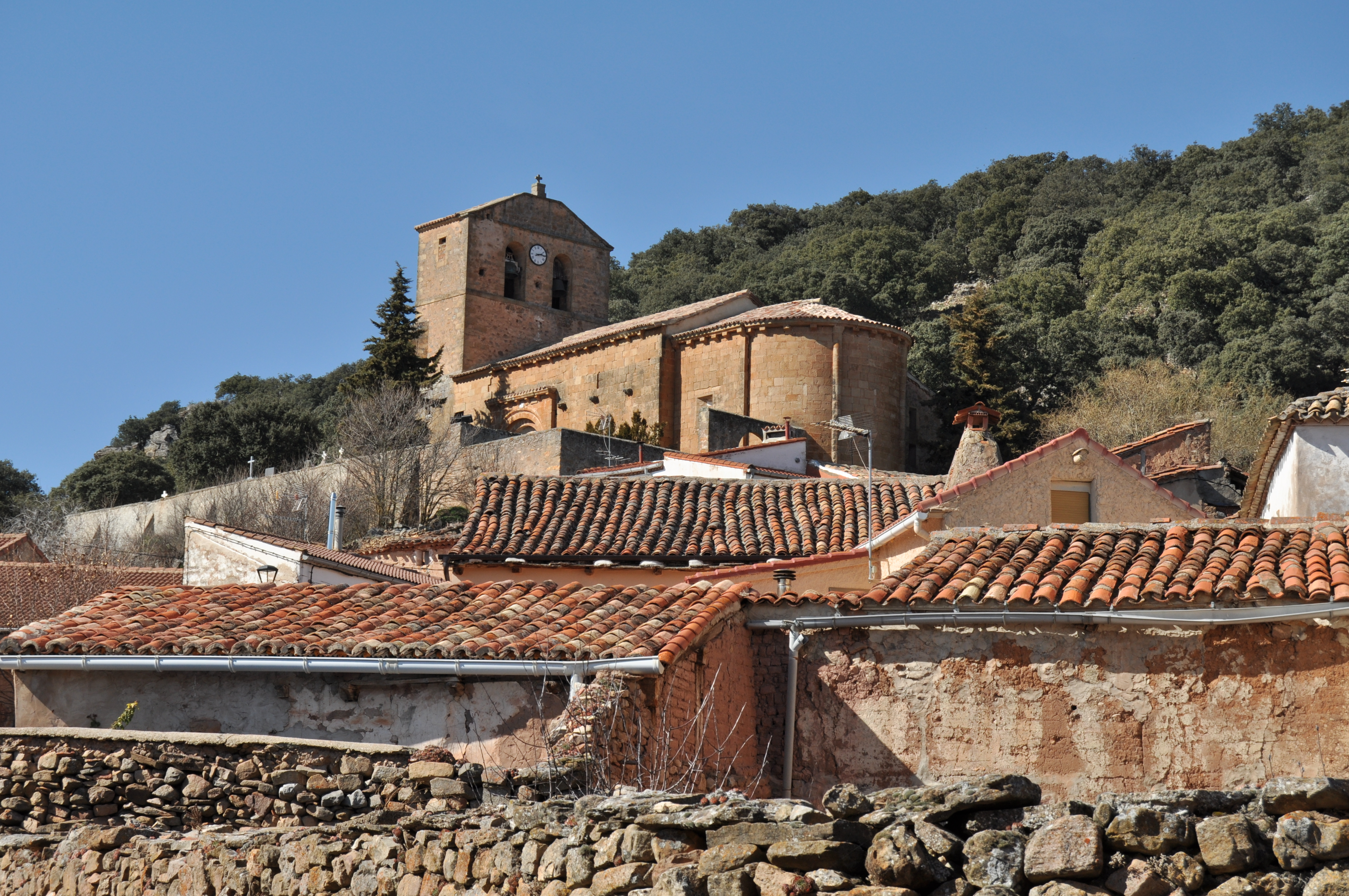
- A view of the church of Valdegeña

- Location in Spain. Valdegeña (Spain)
- Coordinates: 41°49′00″N 2°10′26″W
- Country: Spain
- Autonomous community: Castile and León
- Province: Soria
- Municipality: Valdegeña

Area
  - Total: 13 km^{2} (5.0 sq mi)

Population (2025-01-01)
  - Total: 36
  - Density: 2.8/km^{2} (7.2/sq mi)
- Time zone: UTC+1 (CET)
  - Summer (DST): UTC+2 (CEST)
- Website: Official website

Valdegeña is a municipality located in the province of Soria, Castile and León, Spain. According to the 2004 census (INE), the municipality has a population of 54 inhabitants.
