= Cubilla, Soria =

Cubilla
- Municipality
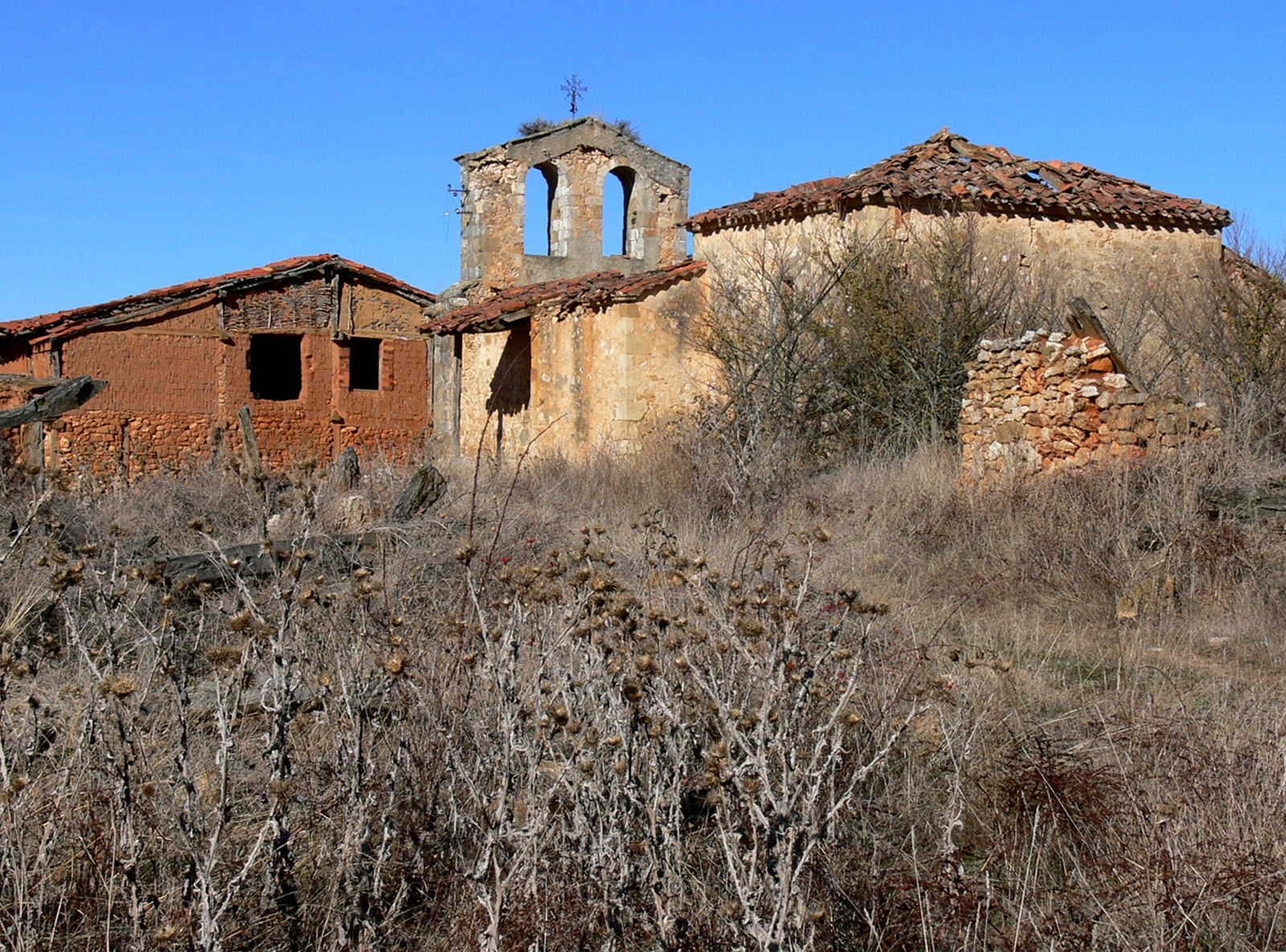

- Location in Spain. Cubilla (Spain)
- Country: Spain
- Autonomous community: Castile and León
- Province: Soria
- Municipality: Cubilla

Area
  - Total: 20.21 km^{2} (7.80 sq mi)
- Elevation: 1,091 m (3,579 ft)

Population (2025-01-01)
  - Total: 22
  - Density: 1.1/km^{2} (2.8/sq mi)
- Time zone: UTC+1 (CET)
  - Summer (DST): UTC+2 (CEST)
- Website: Official website

Cubilla is a municipality located in the province of Soria, Castile and León, Spain. According to the 2004 census (INE), the municipality had a population of 60 inhabitants.
