= Bliecos =

- Municipality
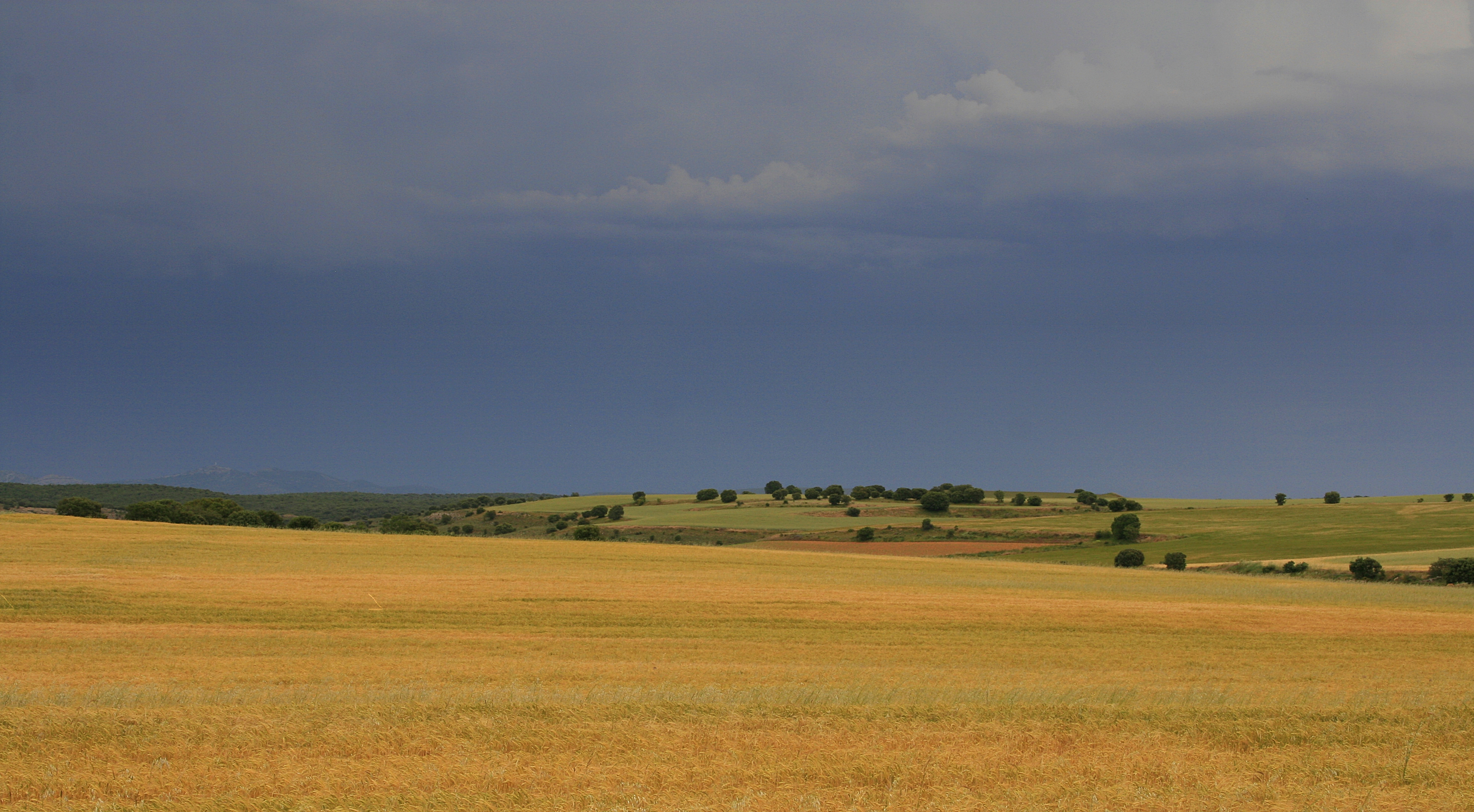

- Location in Spain. Bliecos (Spain)
- Country: Spain
- Autonomous community: Castile and León
- Province: Soria
- Municipality: Bliecos

Area
  - Total: 16 km^{2} (6.2 sq mi)

Population (2025-01-01)
  - Total: 25
  - Density: 1.6/km^{2} (4.0/sq mi)
- Time zone: UTC+1 (CET)
  - Summer (DST): UTC+2 (CEST)
- Website: Official website

Bliecos is a municipality located in the province of Soria, Castile and León, Spain. According to the 2004 census (INE), the municipality has a population of 43 inhabitants.
