= Ciria =

- Municipality
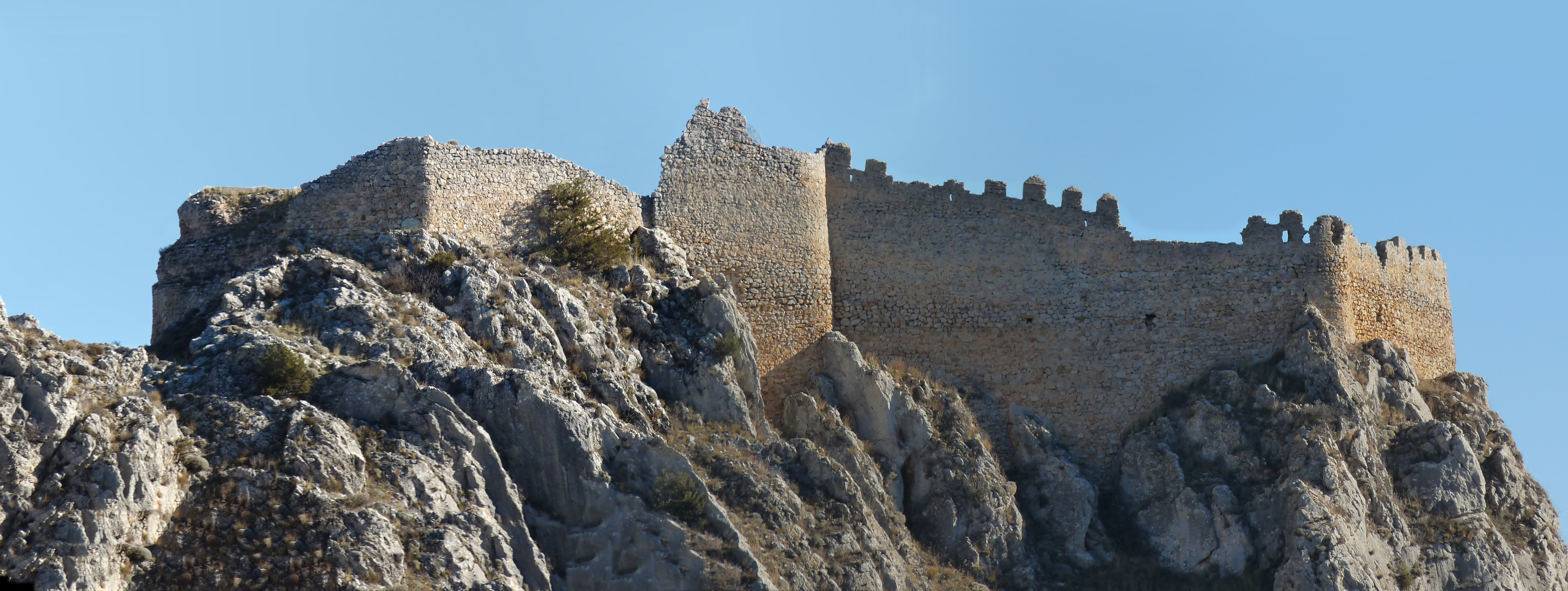

- Location in Spain. Ciria (Spain)
- Country: Spain
- Autonomous community: Castile and León
- Province: Soria
- Municipality: Ciria

Area
  - Total: 52 km^{2} (20 sq mi)

Population (2025-01-01)
  - Total: 67
  - Density: 1.3/km^{2} (3.3/sq mi)
- Time zone: UTC+1 (CET)
  - Summer (DST): UTC+2 (CEST)
- Website: Official website

Ciria is a municipality located in the province of Soria, Castile and León, Spain. According to the 2004 census (INE), the municipality has a population of 103 inhabitants.
