= Almajano =

- Municipality
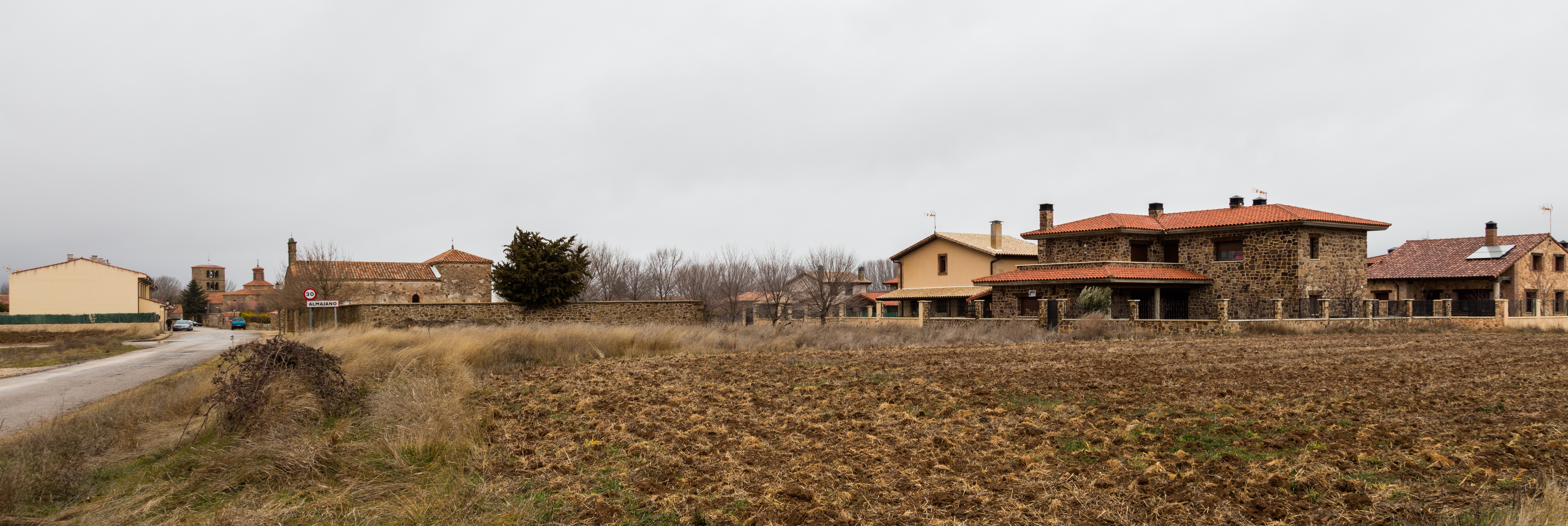

- Location in Spain Almajano (Spain)
- Country: Spain
- Autonomous community: Castile and León
- Province: Soria
- Municipality: Almajano

Area
  - Total: 9 km^{2} (3.5 sq mi)

Population (2025-01-01)
  - Total: 179
  - Density: 20/km^{2} (52/sq mi)
- Time zone: UTC+1 (CET)
  - Summer (DST): UTC+2 (CEST)
- Website: Official website

Almajano is a municipality located in the province of Soria, Castile and León, Spain. According to the 2004 census (INE), the municipality has a population of 200 inhabitants.
