= Espeja de San Marcelino =

- Municipality
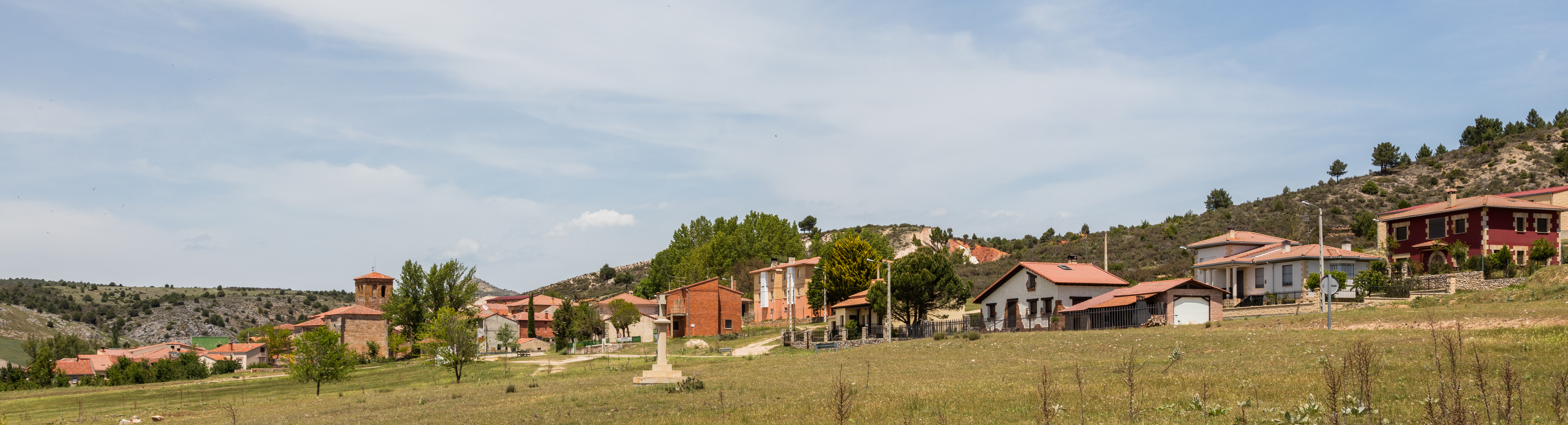

- Flag Coat of arms

- Location in Spain. Espeja de San Marcelino (Spain)
- Coordinates: 41°48′09″N 3°13′19″W
- Country: Spain
- Autonomous community: Castile and León
- Province: Soria
- Municipality: Espeja de San Marcelino

Area
  - Total: 71 km^{2} (27 sq mi)
- Elevation: 1,032 m (3,386 ft)

Population (2025-01-01)
  - Total: 160
  - Density: 2.3/km^{2} (5.8/sq mi)
- Time zone: UTC+1 (CET)
  - Summer (DST): UTC+2 (CEST)
- Website: Official website

Espeja de San Marcelino is a municipality located in the province of Soria, Castile and León, Spain. According to the 2004 census (INE), the municipality has a population of 238 inhabitants.
