= Nafría de Ucero =

- Municipality
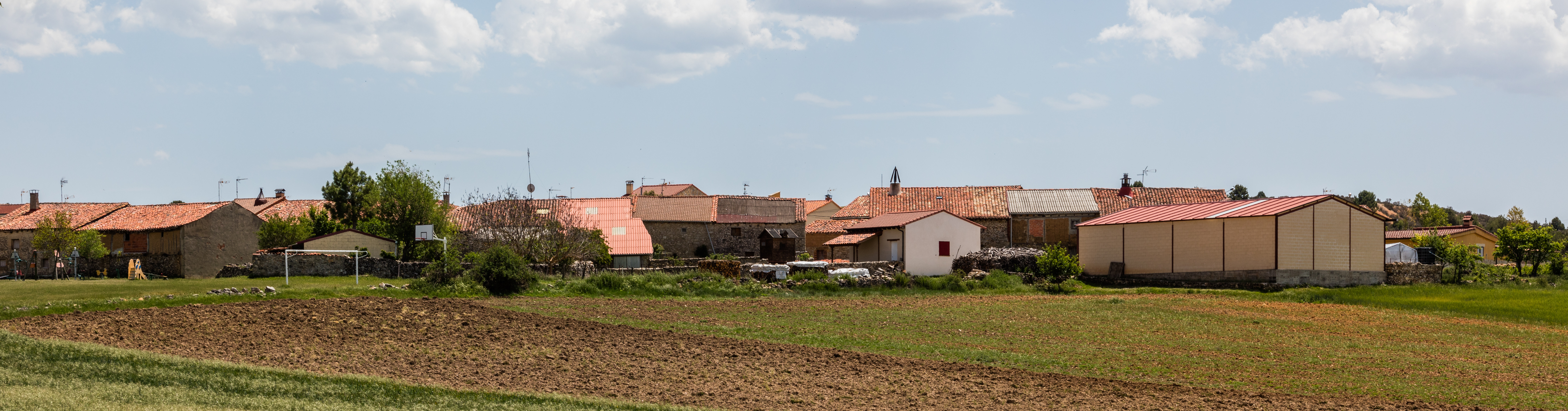
- View of Nafría de Ucero

- Location in Spain. Nafría de Ucero (Spain)
- Coordinates: 41°43′21″N 3°05′41″W
- Country: Spain
- Autonomous community: Castile and León
- Province: Soria
- Municipality: Nafría de Ucero

Area
  - Total: 36 km^{2} (14 sq mi)
- Elevation: 1,026 m (3,366 ft)

Population (2025-01-01)
  - Total: 35
  - Density: 0.97/km^{2} (2.5/sq mi)
- Time zone: UTC+1 (CET)
  - Summer (DST): UTC+2 (CEST)
- Website: Official website

Nafría de Ucero is a municipality located in the province of Soria, Castile and León, Spain. According to the 2004 census (INE), the municipality has a population of 80 inhabitants.
