= Vizmanos =

- Municipality
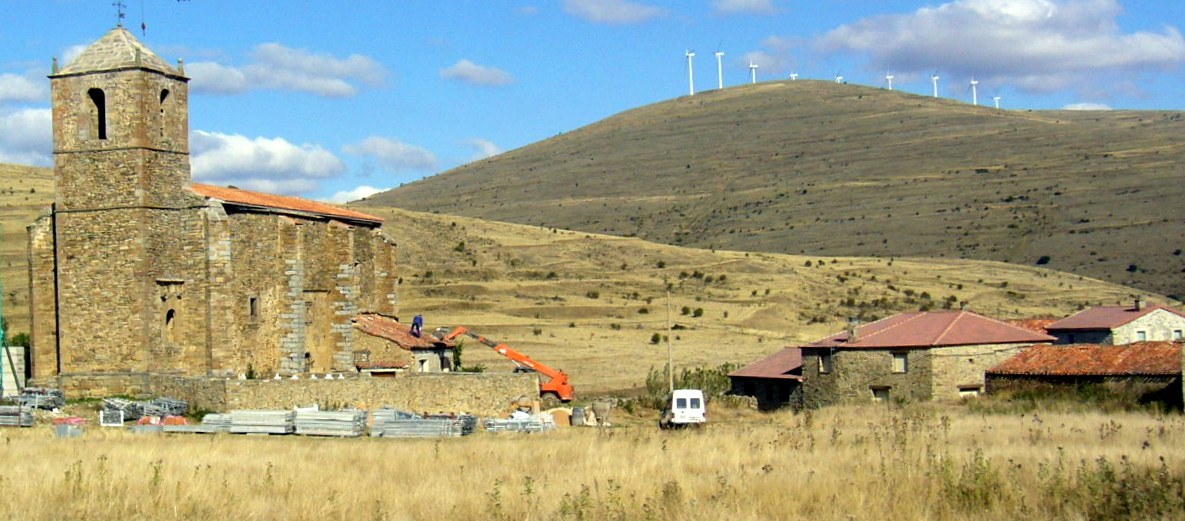
- Church of Vizmanos, Soria, Spain

- Location in Spain. Vizmanos (Spain)
- Coordinates: 42°01′25″N 2°24′27″W
- Country: Spain
- Autonomous community: Castile and León
- Province: Soria
- Municipality: Vizmanos

Area
  - Total: 24.31 km^{2} (9.39 sq mi)
- Elevation: 1,200 m (3,900 ft)

Population (2025-01-01)
  - Total: 31
  - Density: 1.3/km^{2} (3.3/sq mi)
- Time zone: UTC+1 (CET)
  - Summer (DST): UTC+2 (CEST)
- Website: Official website

Vizmanos is a municipality located in the province of Soria, Castile and León, Spain. According to the 2004 census (INE), the municipality had a population of 37 inhabitants.
