= Retortillo de Soria =

- Municipality
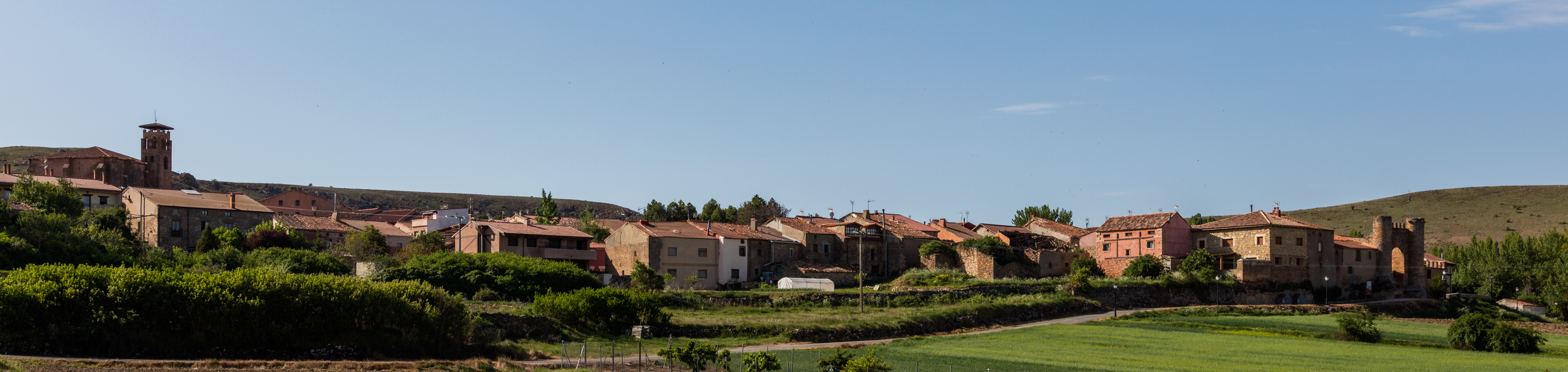

- Coat of arms

- Location in Spain. Retortillo de Soria (Spain)
- Coordinates: 41°18′40″N 2°58′51″W
- Country: Spain
- Autonomous community: Castile and León
- Province: Soria
- Municipality: Retortillo de Soria

Area
  - Total: 172 km^{2} (66 sq mi)
- Elevation: 1,241 m (4,072 ft)

Population (2025-01-01)
  - Total: 126
  - Density: 0.733/km^{2} (1.90/sq mi)
- Time zone: UTC+1 (CET)
  - Summer (DST): UTC+2 (CEST)
- Website: Official website

Retortillo de Soria is a municipality located in the province of Soria, Castile and León, Spain. According to the 2023 census (INE), the municipality has a population of 143 inhabitants.
