= Fuentelsaz de Soria =

- Municipality
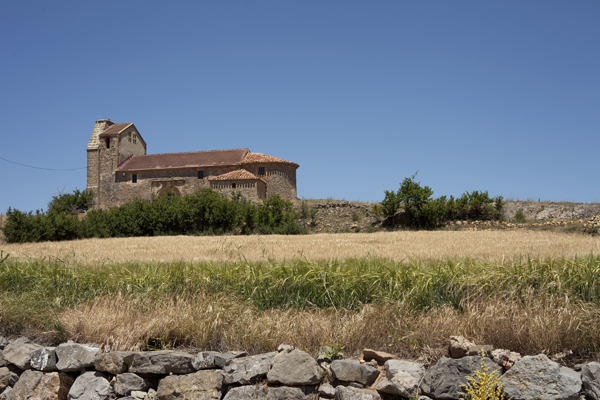

- Location in Spain. Fuentelsaz de Soria (Spain)
- Coordinates: 41°51′58″N 2°24′53″W
- Country: Spain
- Autonomous community: Castile and León
- Province: Soria
- Municipality: Fuentelsaz de Soria

Area
  - Total: 26 km^{2} (10 sq mi)
- Elevation: 1,078 m (3,537 ft)

Population (2025-01-01)
  - Total: 65
  - Density: 2.5/km^{2} (6.5/sq mi)
- Time zone: UTC+1 (CET)
  - Summer (DST): UTC+2 (CEST)
- Website: Official website

Fuentelsaz de Soria is a municipality located in the province of Soria, Castile and León, Spain. According to the 2004 census (INE), the municipality has a population of 53 inhabitants.
